= FAW-Volkswagen =

Chinese automotive company

FAW-Volkswagen Automobile Co., Ltd.
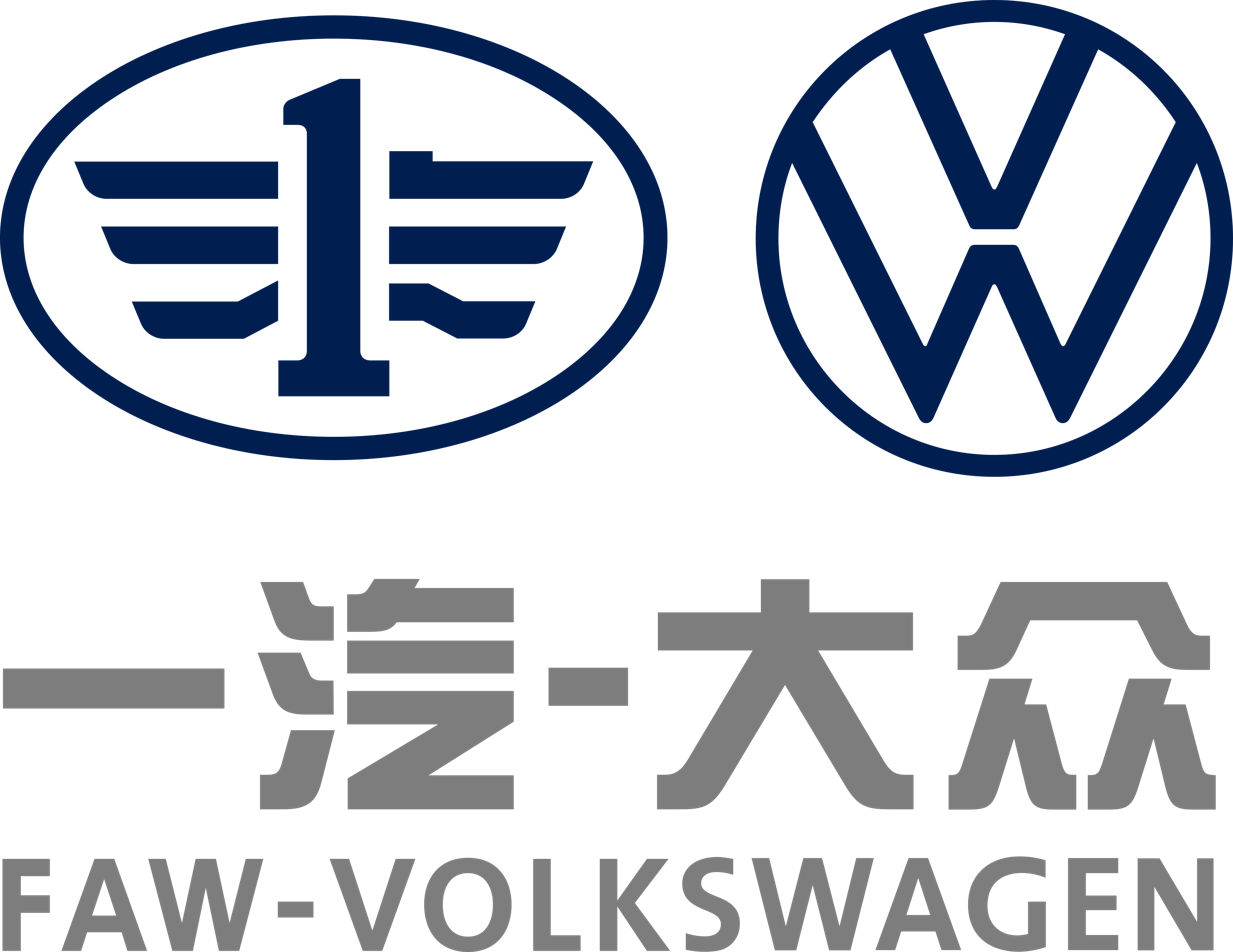

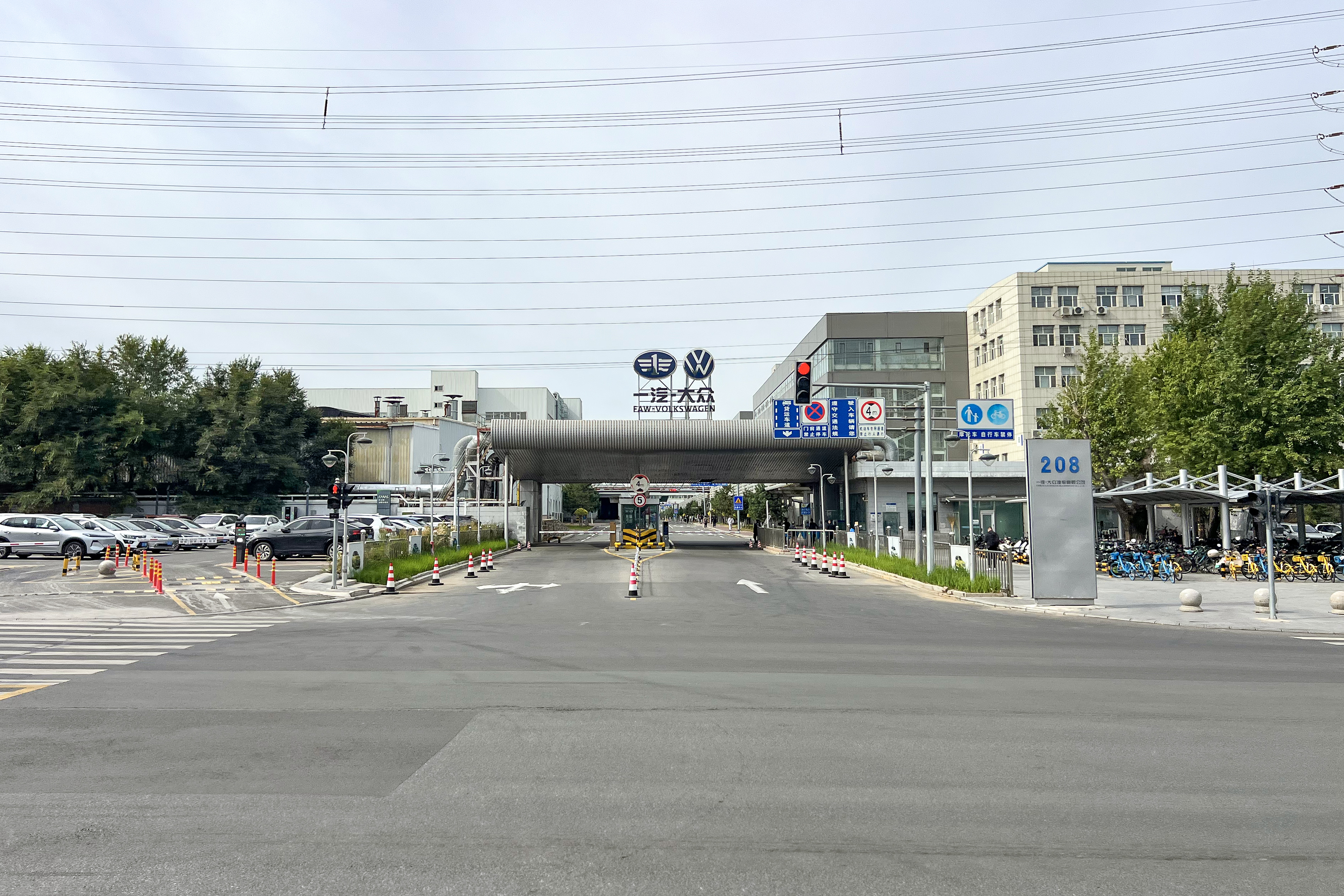
- Gate 208 of the FAW-Volkswagen Automotive factory in Changchun, Jilin province, China.
- Native name: 一汽-大众汽车有限公司
- Type: Joint venture
- Industry: Automotive
- Founded: 6 February 1991; 35 years ago
- Headquarters: Changchun, Jilin, China
- Area served: China
- Key people: Chairman: Xiandong Qiu; General Manager: Zhanfu Pan
- Products: Automobiles; Engines; Transmissions
- Brands: Volkswagen; Audi; Jetta
- Parent: FAW Group (60%); Volkswagen AG (20%); Audi AG (10%); Volkswagen (China) Invest (10%)

Chinese name
- Simplified Chinese: 一汽-大众汽车有限公司
- Traditional Chinese: 一汽-大眾汽車有限公司
Transcriptions
Standard Mandarin
- Hanyu Pinyin: Yīqì Dàzhòng qì chē Yǒu xiàn Gōngsī
- Website: www.faw-vw.com

FAW-Volkswagen Automobile Co., Ltd. is a joint venture between FAW Group and Volkswagen Group which manufactures Audi and Volkswagen marque passenger cars for sale in China. It was founded on 6 February 1991.

FAW-VW is headquartered in the south-western fringes of Changchun, Jilin Province, where it also has two vehicle assembly plants. It has an additional assembly plant in Chengdu, Sichuan Province, and a fourth plant is under construction in Foshan, Guangdong Province. FAW-VW is capable of producing the cars based on the platforms of PQ34, PQ35 and PQ46.

FAW-VW's year-on-year production volume exceeded 513,000 units as of 31 July 2009.

== History ==
=== 1980s ===
Audi AG began a contract on August 13, 1988, with First Automobile Works to produce the Audi 100 for the Chinese market. The 100 was assembled with imported parts from Germany.

=== 1990s ===
On November 20, 1990, the official contract of an annual capacity of 150,000 cars for the joint venture between FAW Group (First Automotive Works Group) and Volkswagen AG was signed by Geng Zhaojie (耿昭杰), President of FAW and Dr. Carl Hahn, CEO of Volkswagen AG in the Great Hall of the People, Beijing. All of the facilities in the first car plant, including the body shop, paint shop and assembly shop came together from the abandoned factory of VW's in Westmoreland, USA. The company started its business officially on September 1, 1992.

On December 5, 1991, the first Volkswagen Jetta Mk2 rolled off the line. Two years later, on February 7, 1993, the 10,000th car rolled off the line.

In 1995 FAW Group, Volkswagen AG and Audi AG decided to integrate Audi to the product line of the joint ventures, the equity holdings were also changed with 60% for FAW, 30% for VW and 10% Audi.

On May 20, 1996, the first Audi 200 rolled off the line.

On July 10, 1996, the engine shop started running as well as full-scale production.

By July 1996, the company was capable of producing 150,000 cars, 270,000 engines and 180,000 gearboxes in one year.

In 1997 FAW-Volkswagen Sales Company Ltd. was established as a joint venture between FAW-VW and FAW Group with the equity holdings of 50% for each, it was a smart idea of avoiding the Germans to take control of the sales department under the policy of the governing body then. By 2002 FAW-VW took the majority of the equities back from FAW Group.

In 1998 the Jetta King became the first car ever equipped with ABS system in the Chinese A-class market.

In 1999 the Jetta was registered in FIA Group N category, it entered a lot of Rally events in China with FRD Sport and Qingyang Racing from the late 1990s to early 2000s.

=== 2000s ===
In 2002 the Jetta became the first mass production passenger car in China to be available with a diesel engine.

On January 7, 2004, the 1,000,000 car (a Bora A4) rolled off the line.

On December 7, 2004, FAW-VW's second car plant began operating.

On August 4, 2009, the 3,000,000th car (a Golf A6) rolled off the line in car plant #2.

=== 2010s ===
By 2010 FAW-VW had sold over 1,000,000 Audis (including imported cars) in China. With the celebration, a sculpture named 'Ode to Audi' from Gerry Judah was set at the entrance of the company.

According to Chinese government policy, foreign auto manufactures should develop domestic brands with their local partners. Thus FAW-VW revealed its own brand 'Kaili (开利)' in May 2011.

On August 15, 2011, FAW-VW celebrated its twentieth anniversary with its one millionth car in 2011 (a Magotan B7L).

In 2014, Volkswagen Group and its Chinese joint venture partner First Automotive Works (FAW) announced an agreement to extend their partnership for a further 25 years, until the year 2041.

On March 26, 2019, FAW-VW launched the Jetta brand, with three new vehicles: Jetta VA3, VS5 and VS7. While VA3 is a rebadge of the Volkswagen Jetta sold in China, both SUV models, VS5 and VS7, are rebadges of SEAT models. The sales is scheduled to start in the third quarter of this year. All Jetta models are assembled at the Chengdu plant.

=== 2020s ===
In September 2025, Volkswagen began exporting models made in China by FAW-VW to the Middle East.

== Leadership ==
From	To	President
1991	January 1, 1996	Lin Ganwei (林敢为)
January 1, 1996	January 1, 2002	Lu Linkui (陆林奎)
January 1, 2002	January 1, 2006	Qin Huanming (秦焕明)
January 1, 2006	April 27, 2013	An Tiecheng (安铁成)
April 27, 2013	present	Zhang Pijie (张丕杰)

== Facilities ==
Name	Location	Founded	Annual capacity	Production
Changchun Plant	Changchun, Jilin	1991		Audi A5L, Audi A6L, Audi Q5L, Audi Q5L Sportback, Volkswagen Magotan, Volkswagen CC, Volkswagen CC Shooting Brake
Chengdu Branch	Chengdu, Sichuan	2011		Jetta VA3, Jetta VA7, Jetta VS5, Jetta VS7, Volkswagen Sagitar, Volkswagen Sagitar L
Foshan Branch	Foshan, Guangdong	2013	600,000 vehicles	Audi Q2L, Audi Q4 e-tron, Volkswagen Golf VIII, Volkswagen ID. Aura T6, Volkswagen T-Roc
Qingdao Branch	Qingdao, Shandong	2018	300,000 vehicles	Volkswagen Bora, Audi A3 Sportback, Audi A3L
Tianjin Branch	Tianjin	2018	300,000 vehicles	Audi Q3, Audi Q3 Sportback, Volkswagen Talagon, Volkswagen Tavendor, Volkswagen Tayron, Volkswagen Tayron X

== Current products ==
Automobile production started in December 1991, and the current manufactured range includes:

=== Audi ===
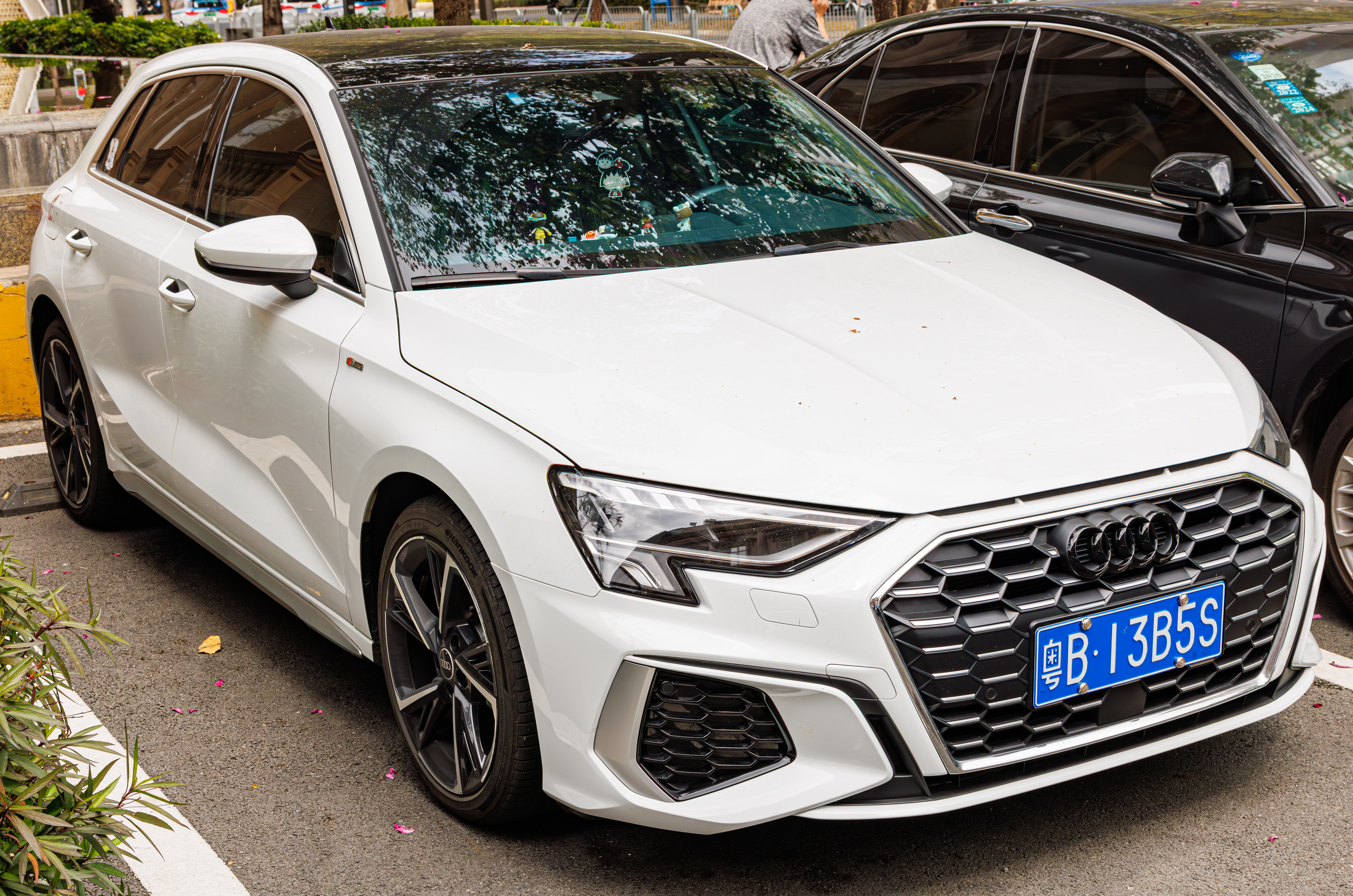
2020–present
奥迪A3
Audi A3 Sportback 8Y

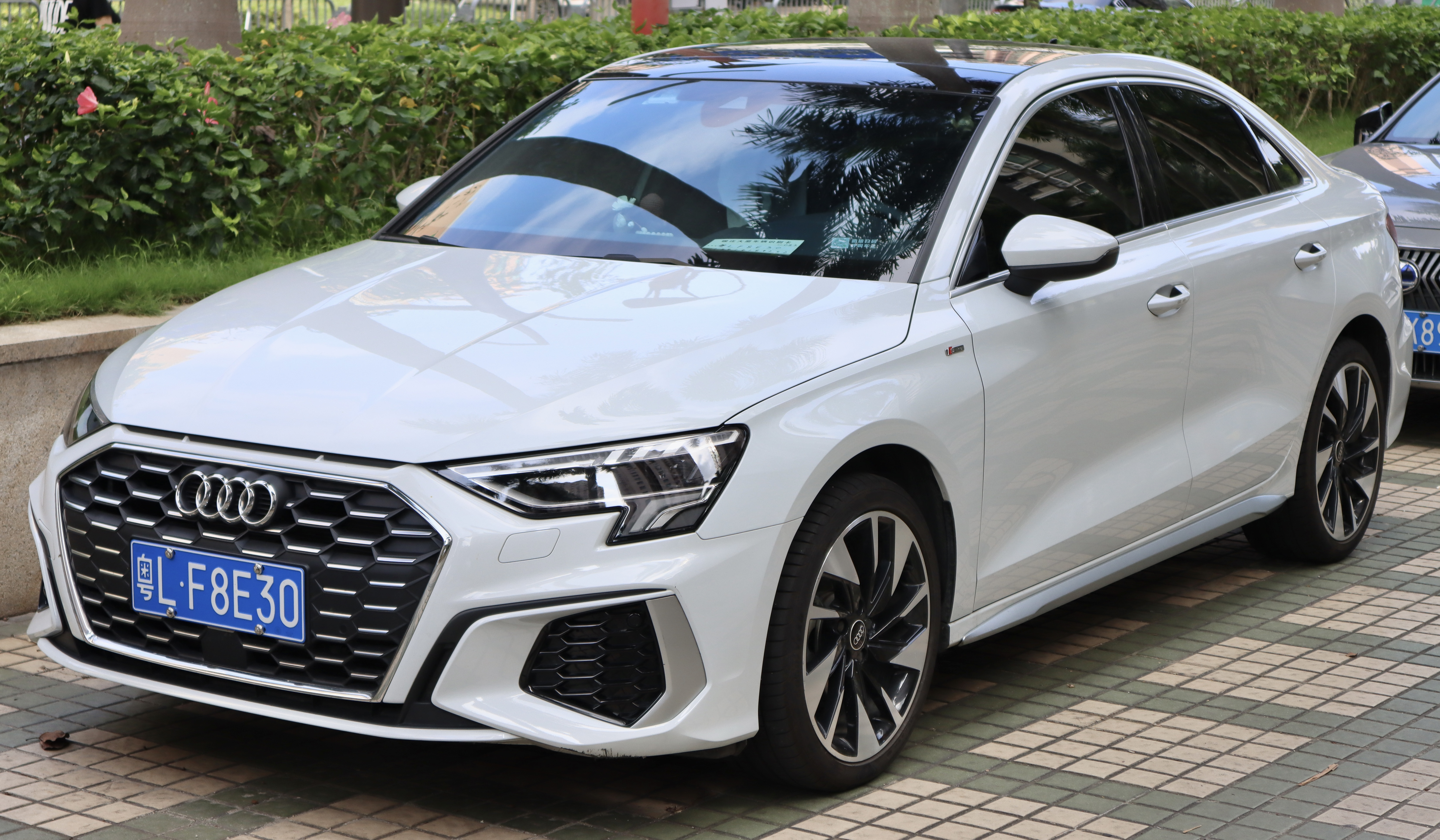
2020–present
奥迪A3L
Audi A3L

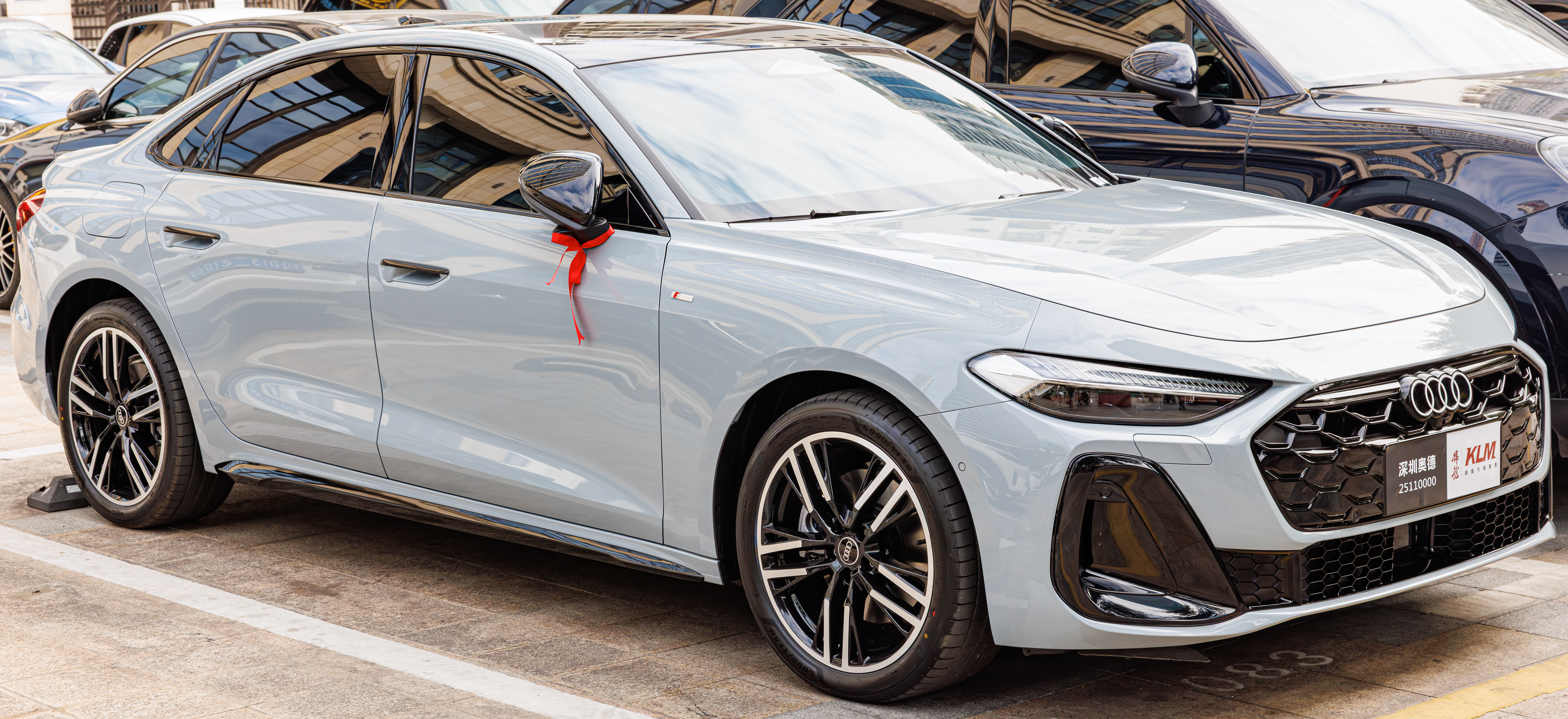
2025–present
奥迪A5L
Audi A5L B10

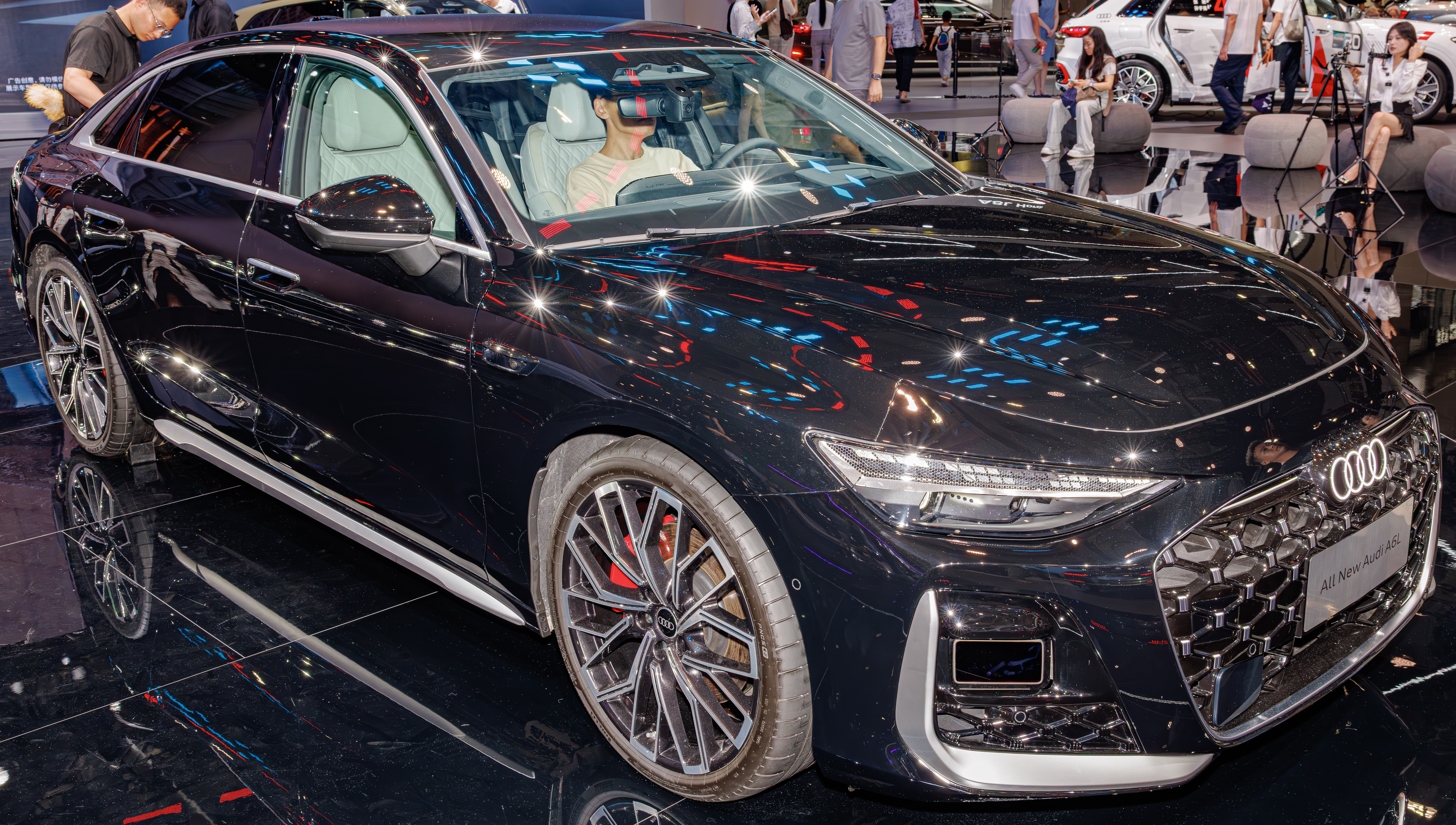
2026–present
奥迪A6L
Audi A6L C9

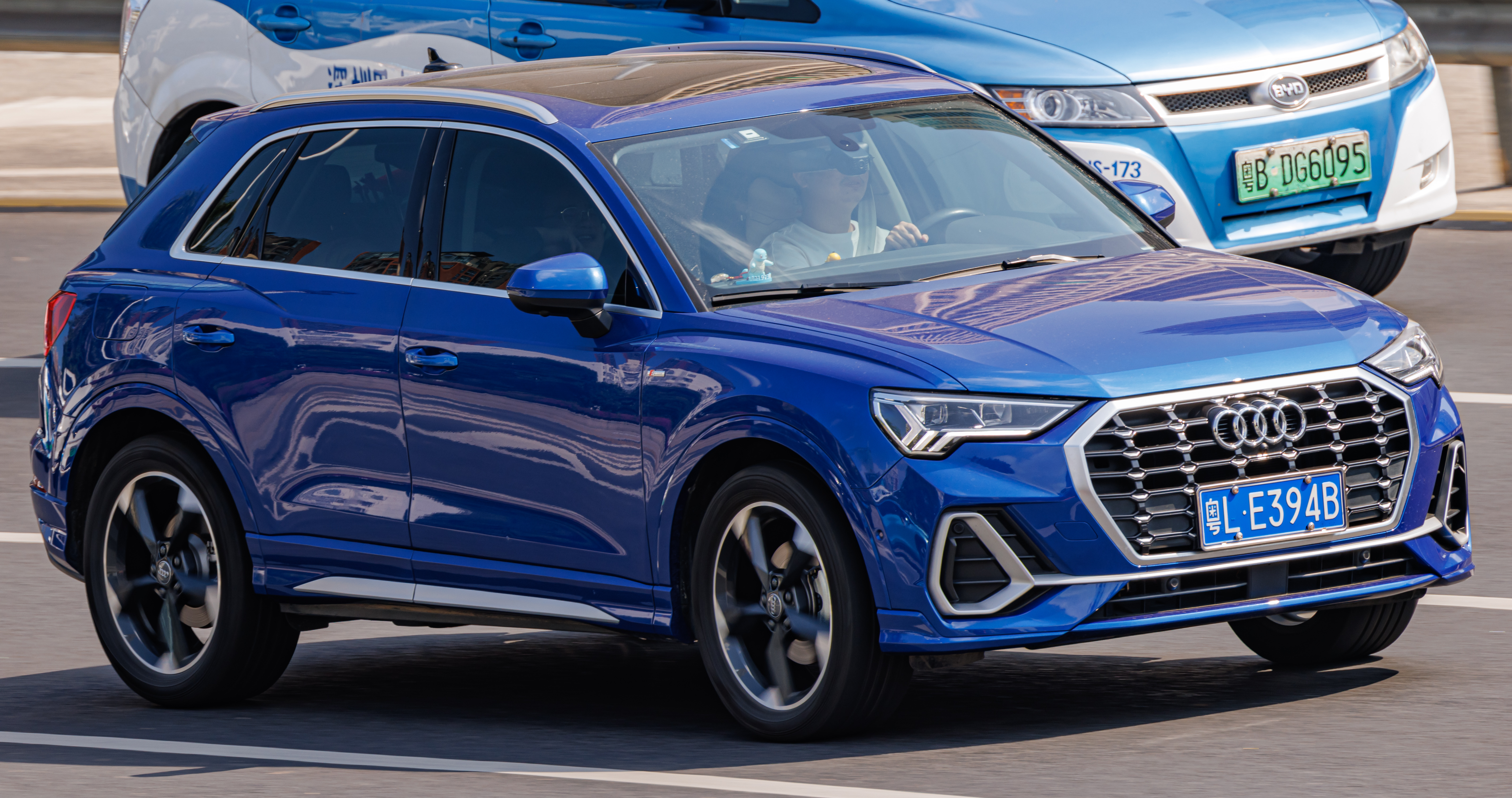
2019–present
奥迪Q3
Audi Q3 F3

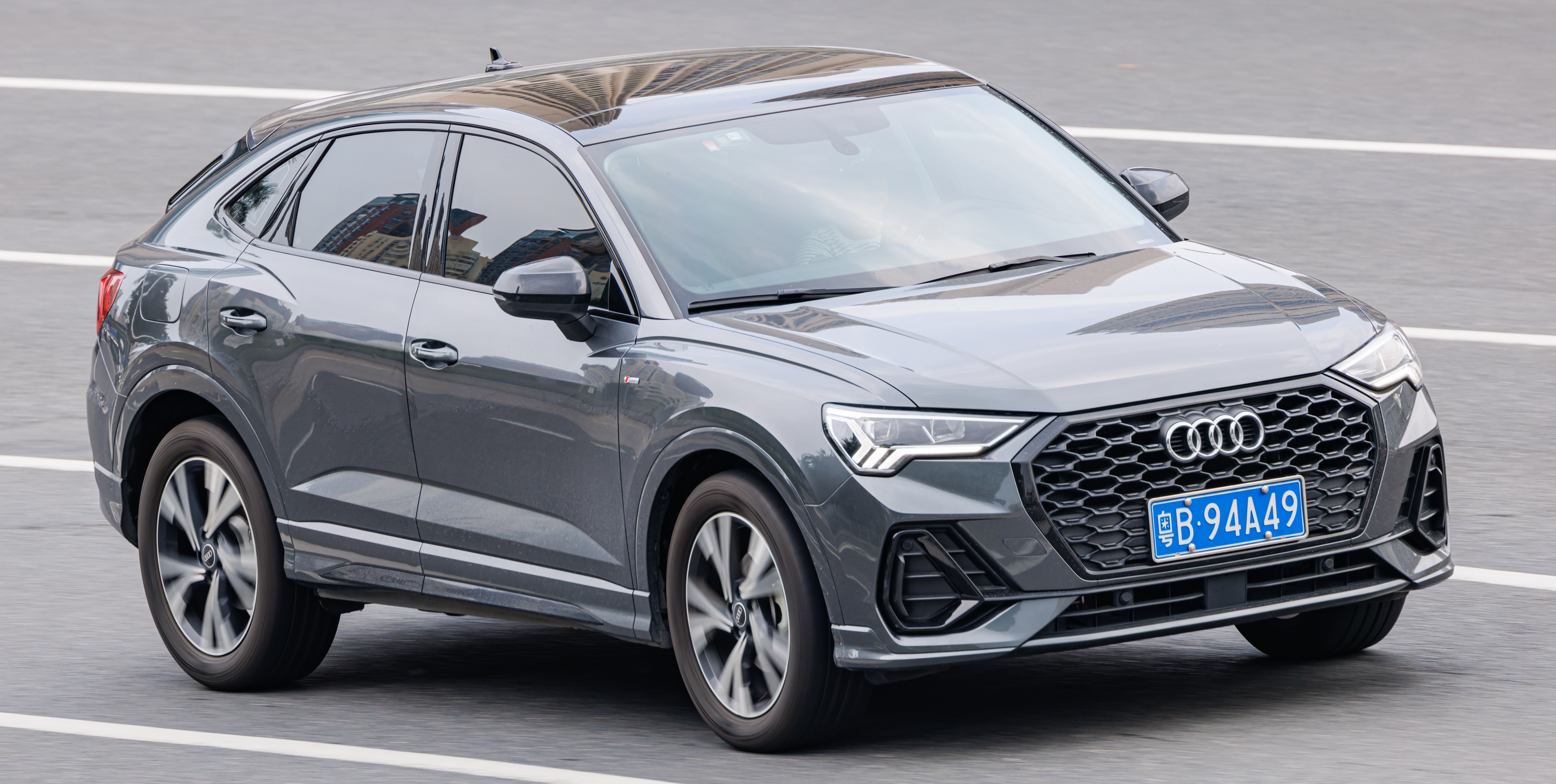
2020–present
奥迪Q3
Audi Q3 Sportback

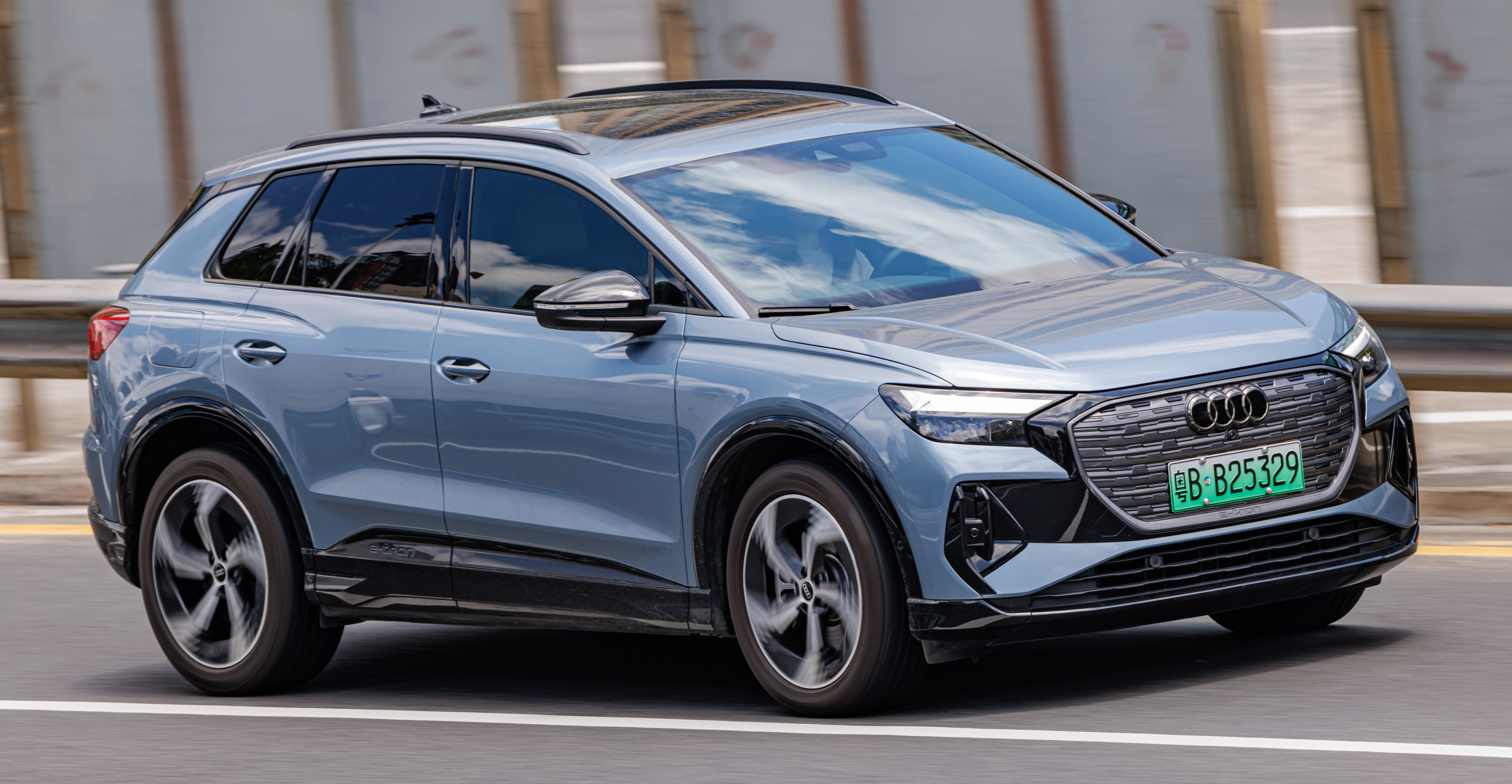
2023–present
奥迪Q4 e-tron
Audi Q4 e-tron

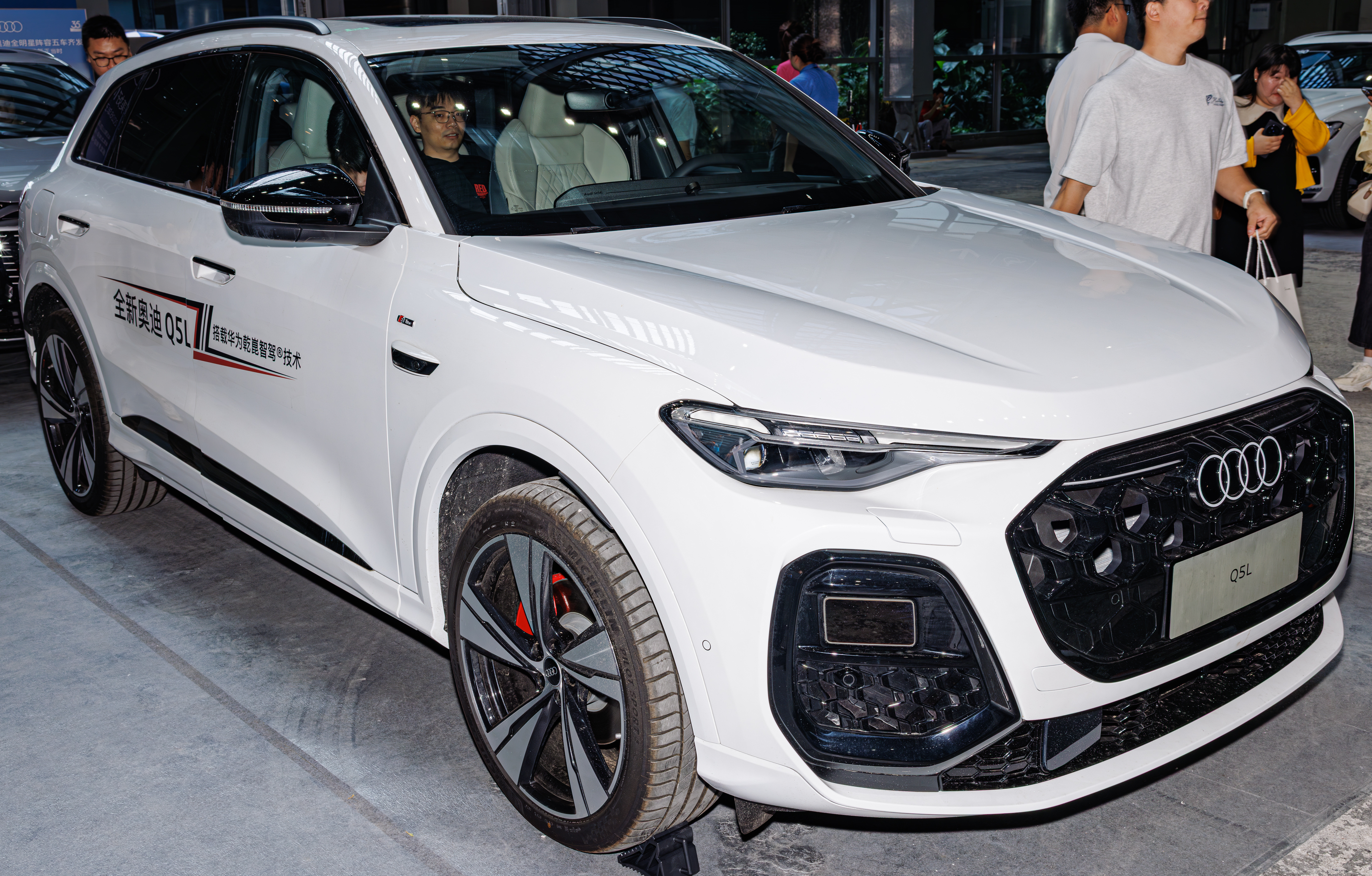
2026–present
奥迪Q5L
Audi Q5L GU

=== Jetta ===
2026–present
捷达M6
Jetta M6

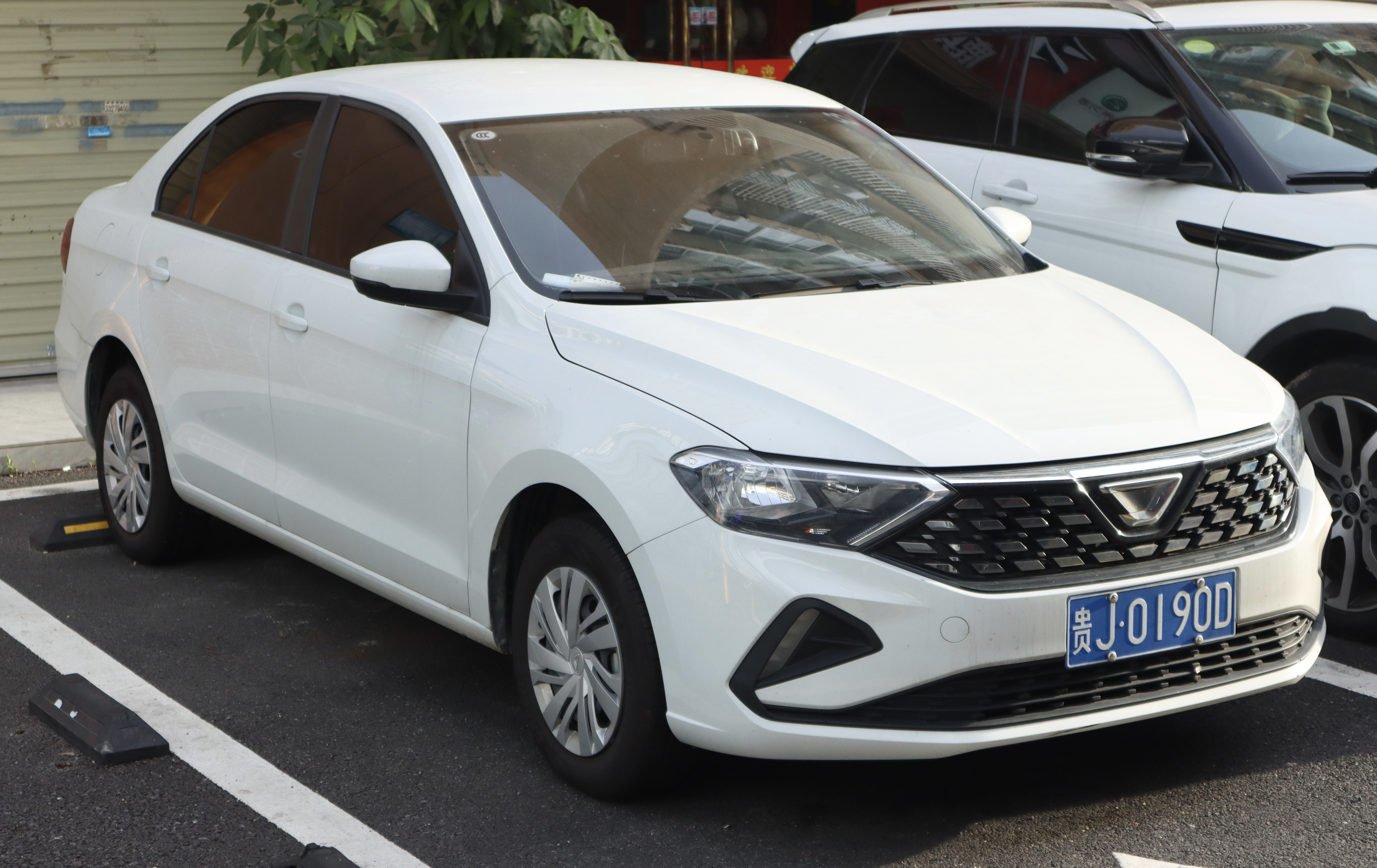
2019–present
捷达VA3
Jetta VA3

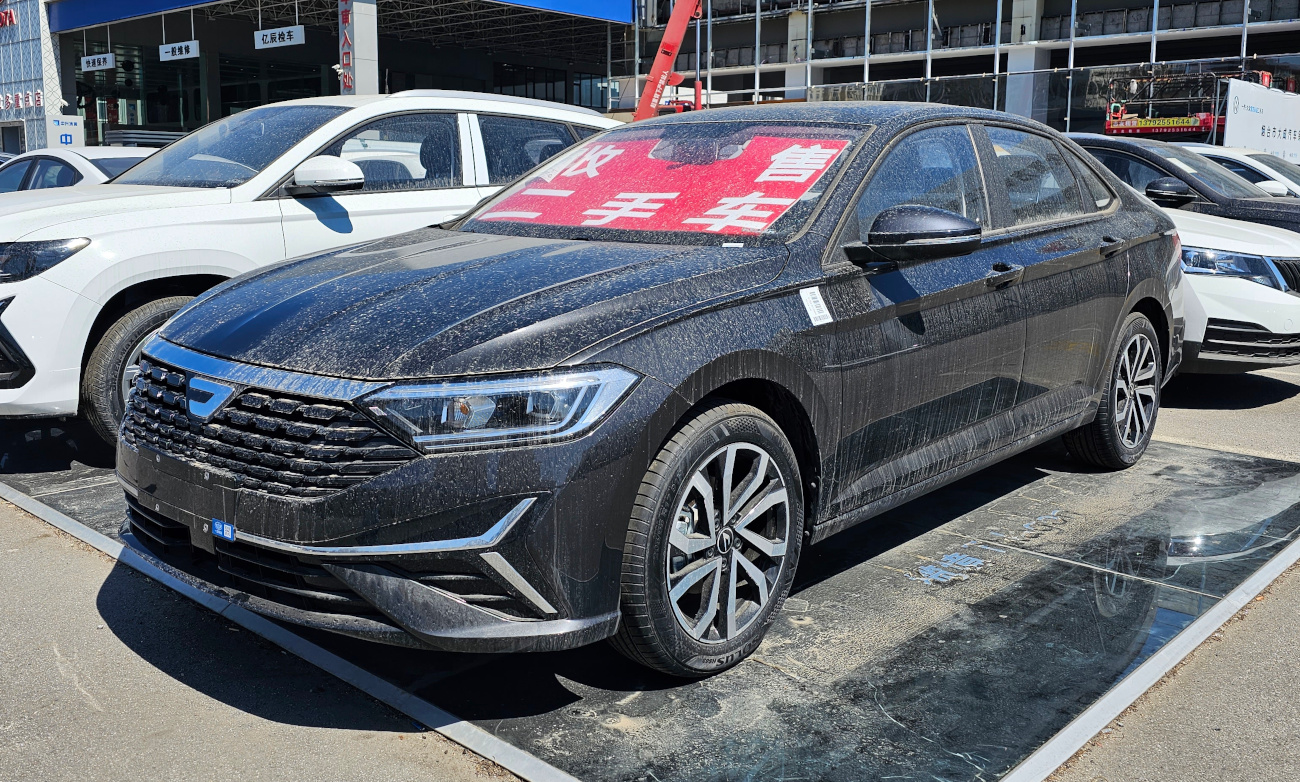
2025–present
捷达VA7
Jetta VA7

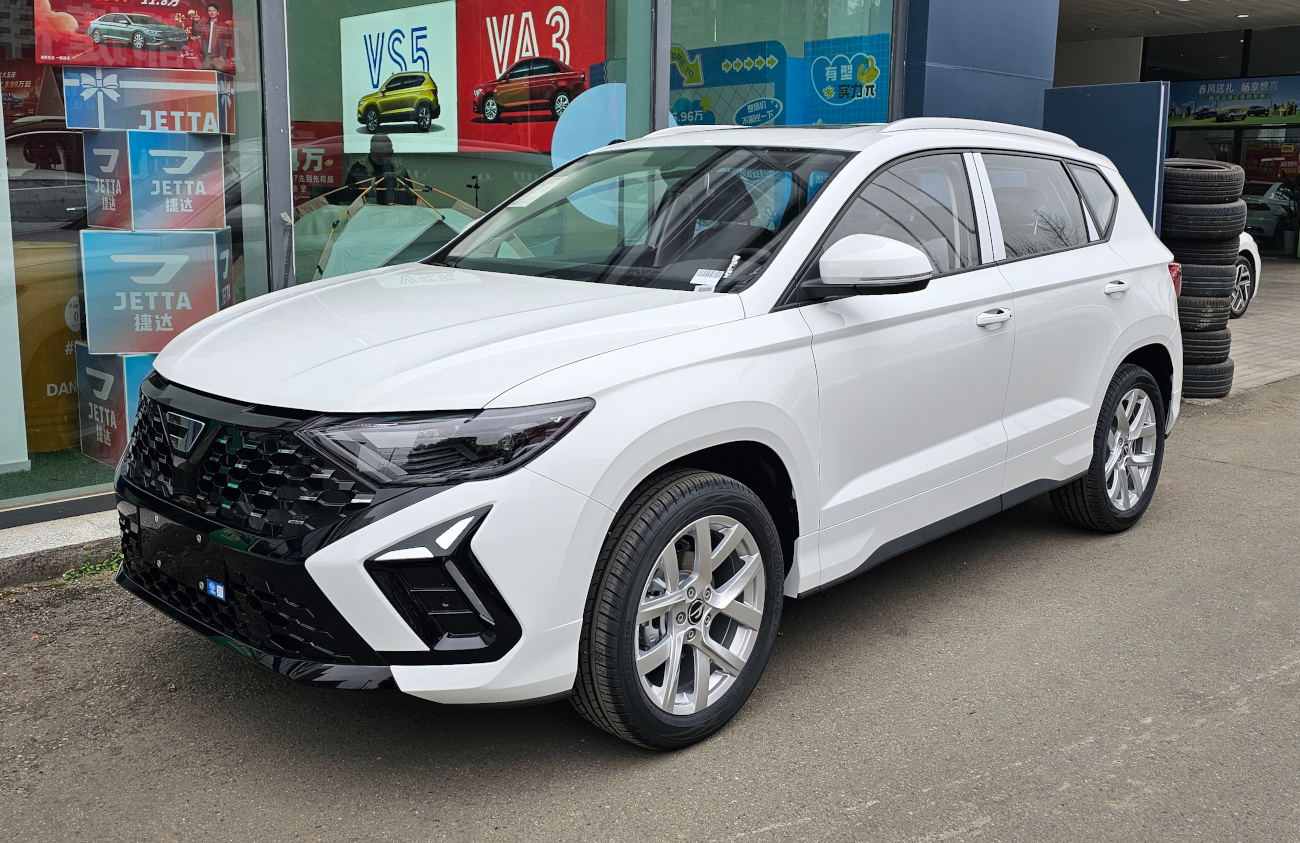
2019–present
捷达VS5
Jetta VS5

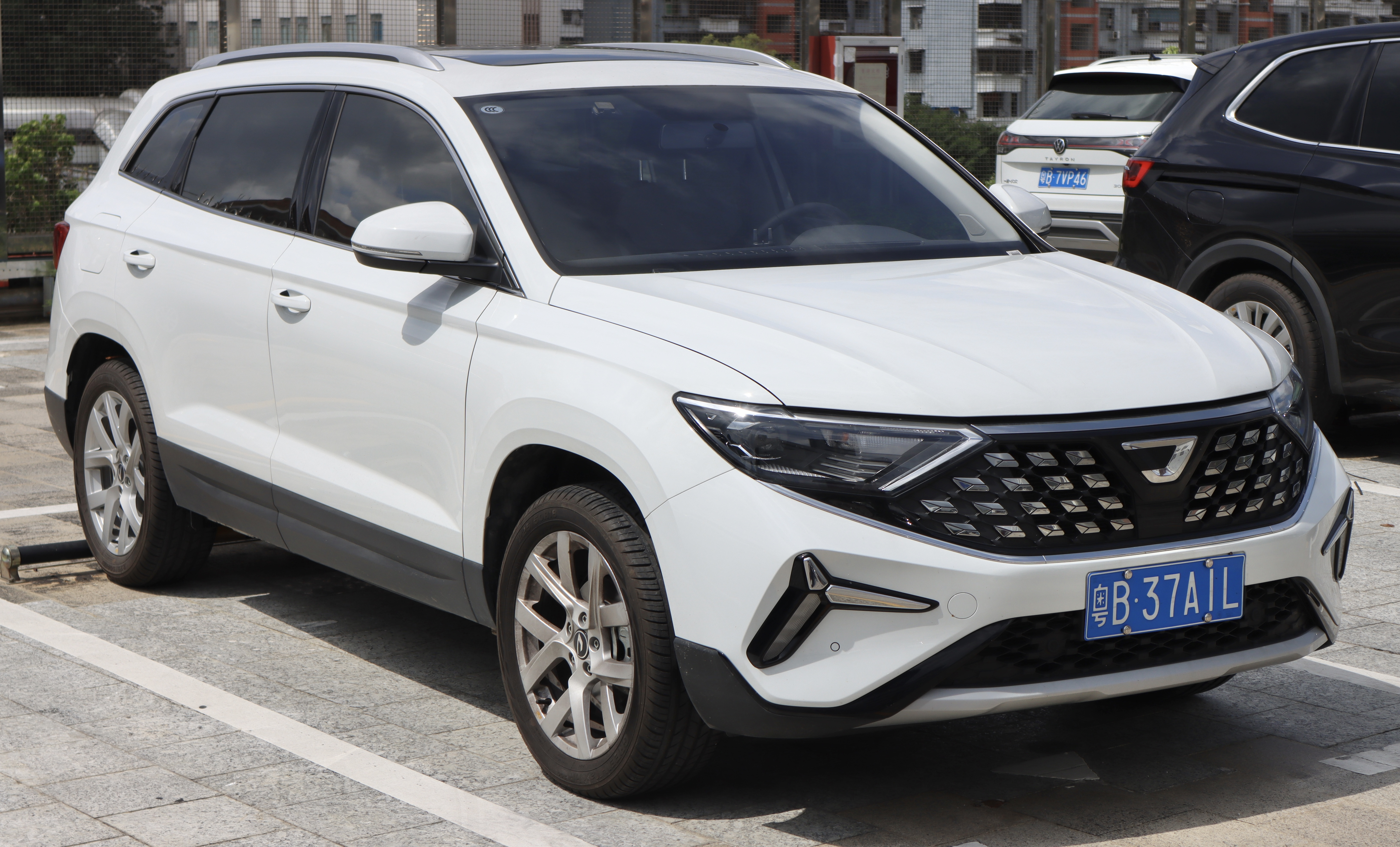
2020–present
捷达VS7
Jetta VS7

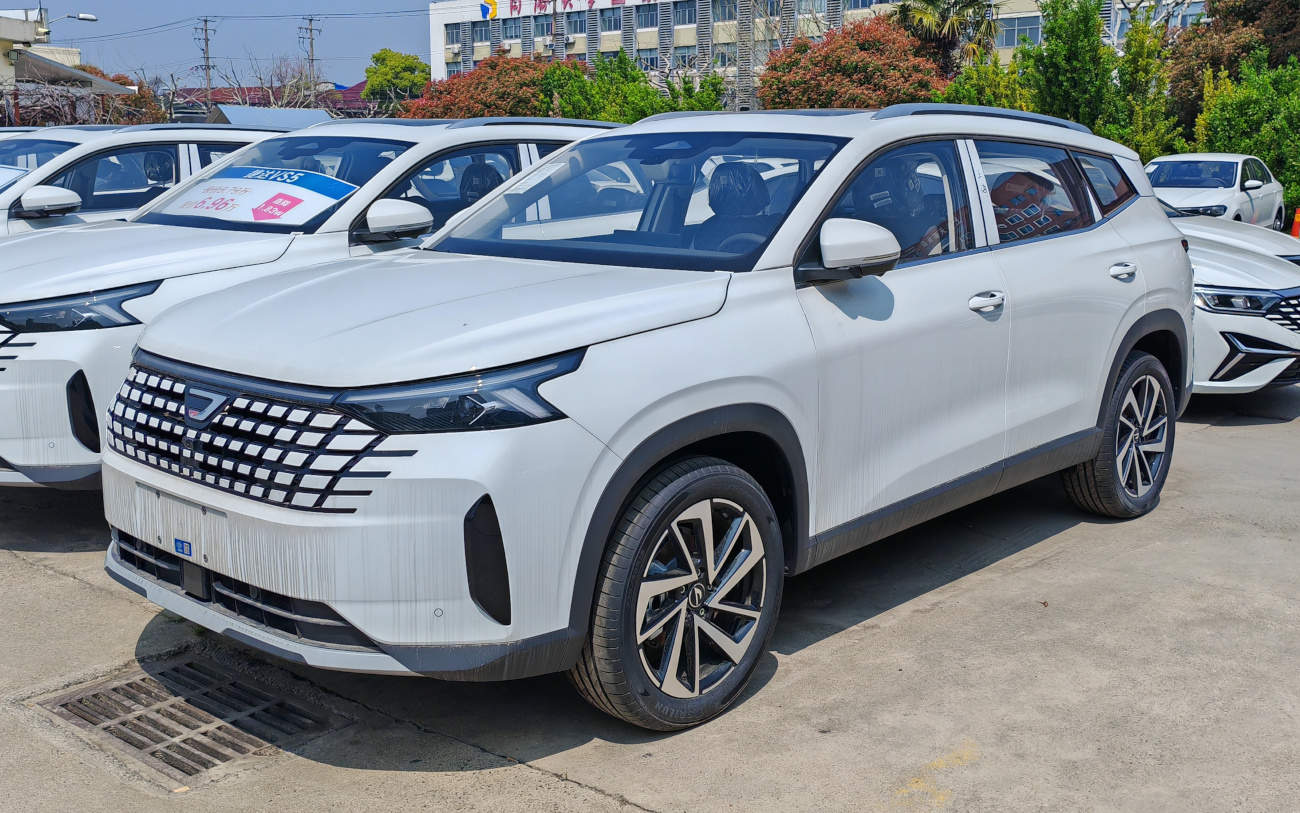
2025–present
捷达VS8
Jetta VS8

=== Volkswagen ===
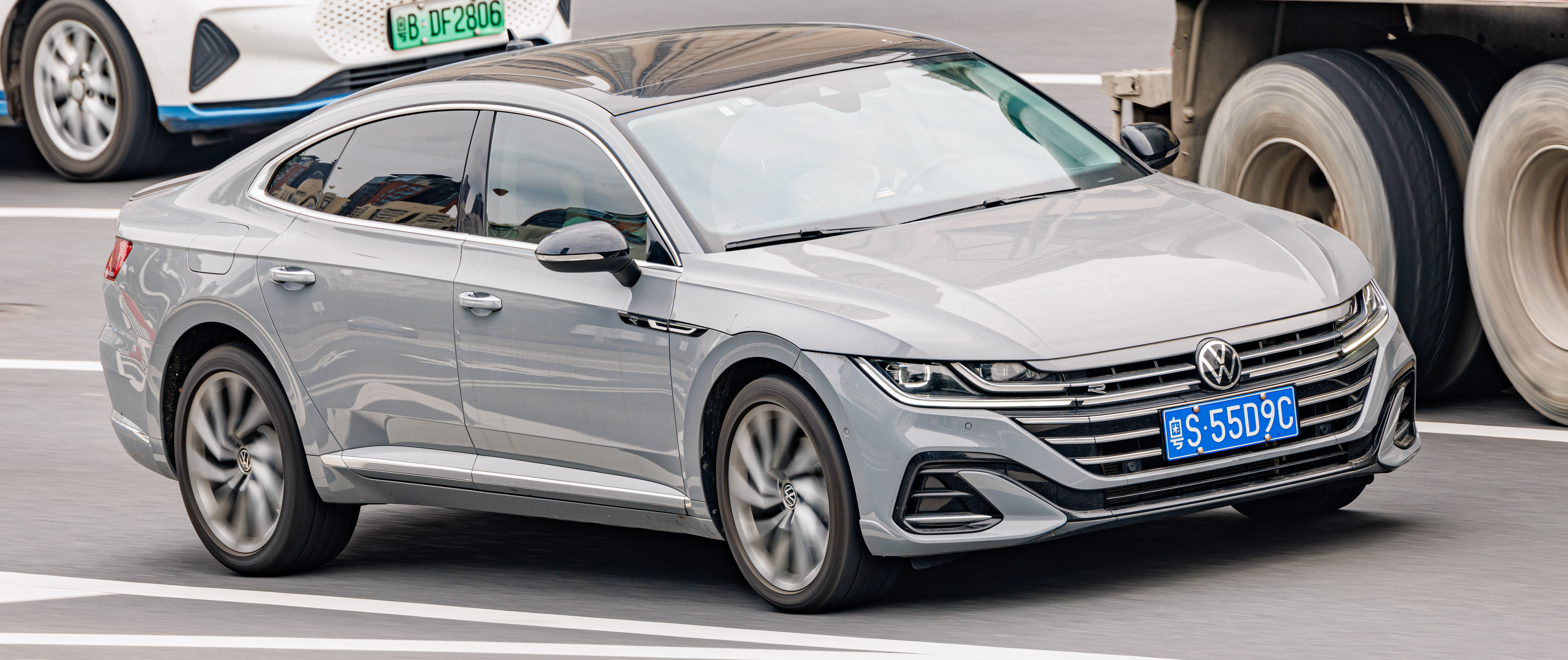
2018–present
大众CC
Volkswagen CC

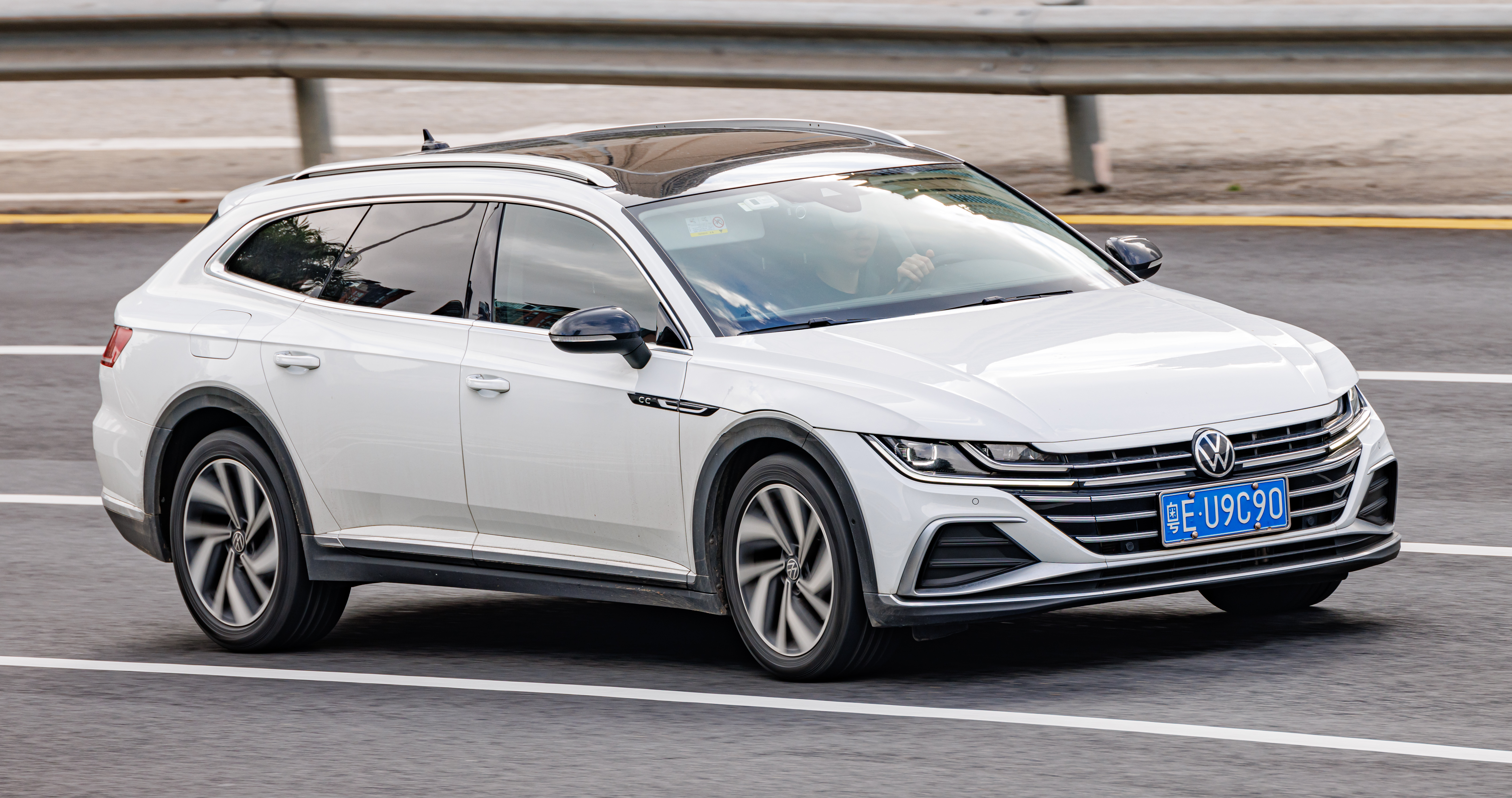
2020–present
大众CC猎装车
Volkswagen CC Shooting Brake

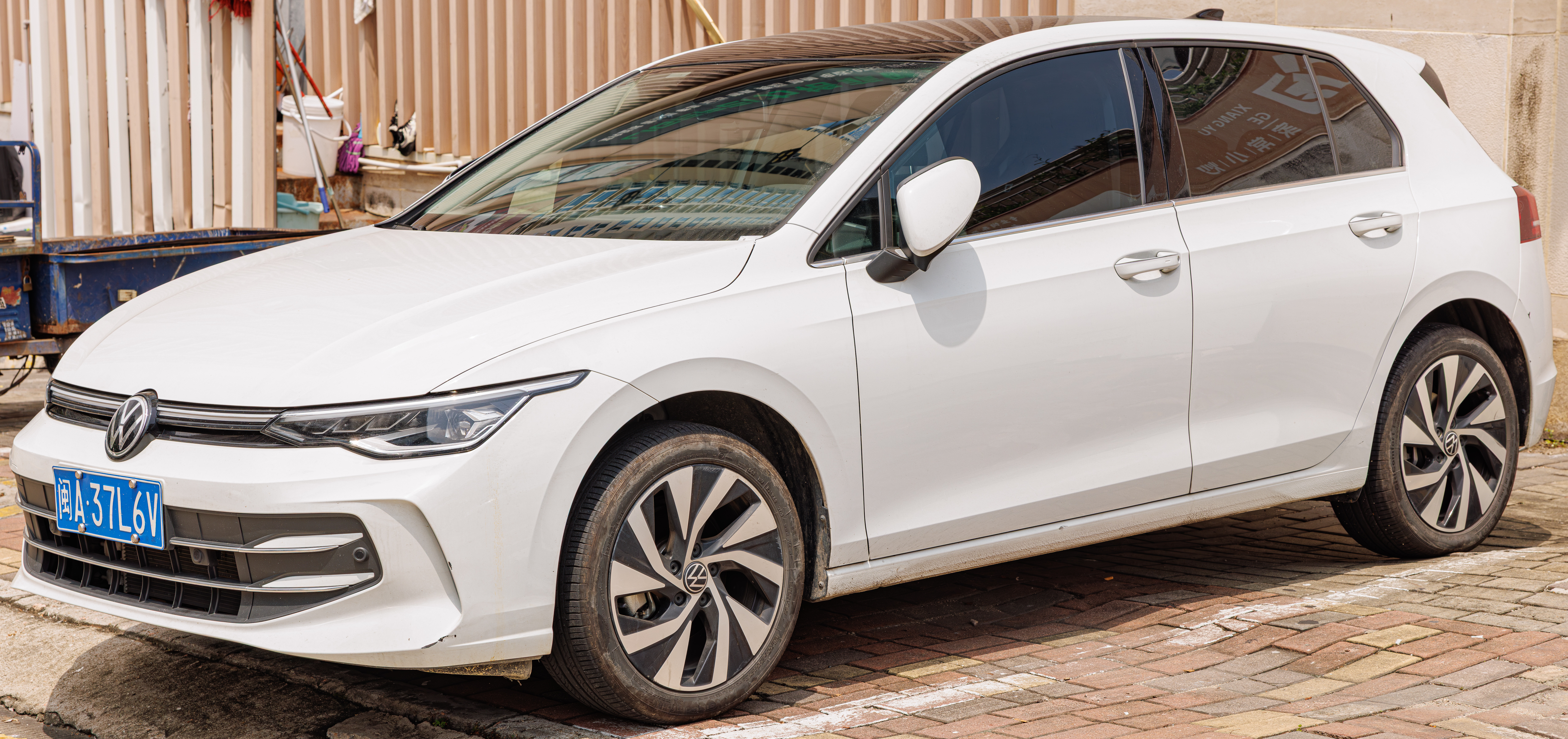
2020–present
大众高尔夫
Volkswagen Golf VIII

2026–present
大众ID. AURA L5
Volkswagen ID. Aura L5

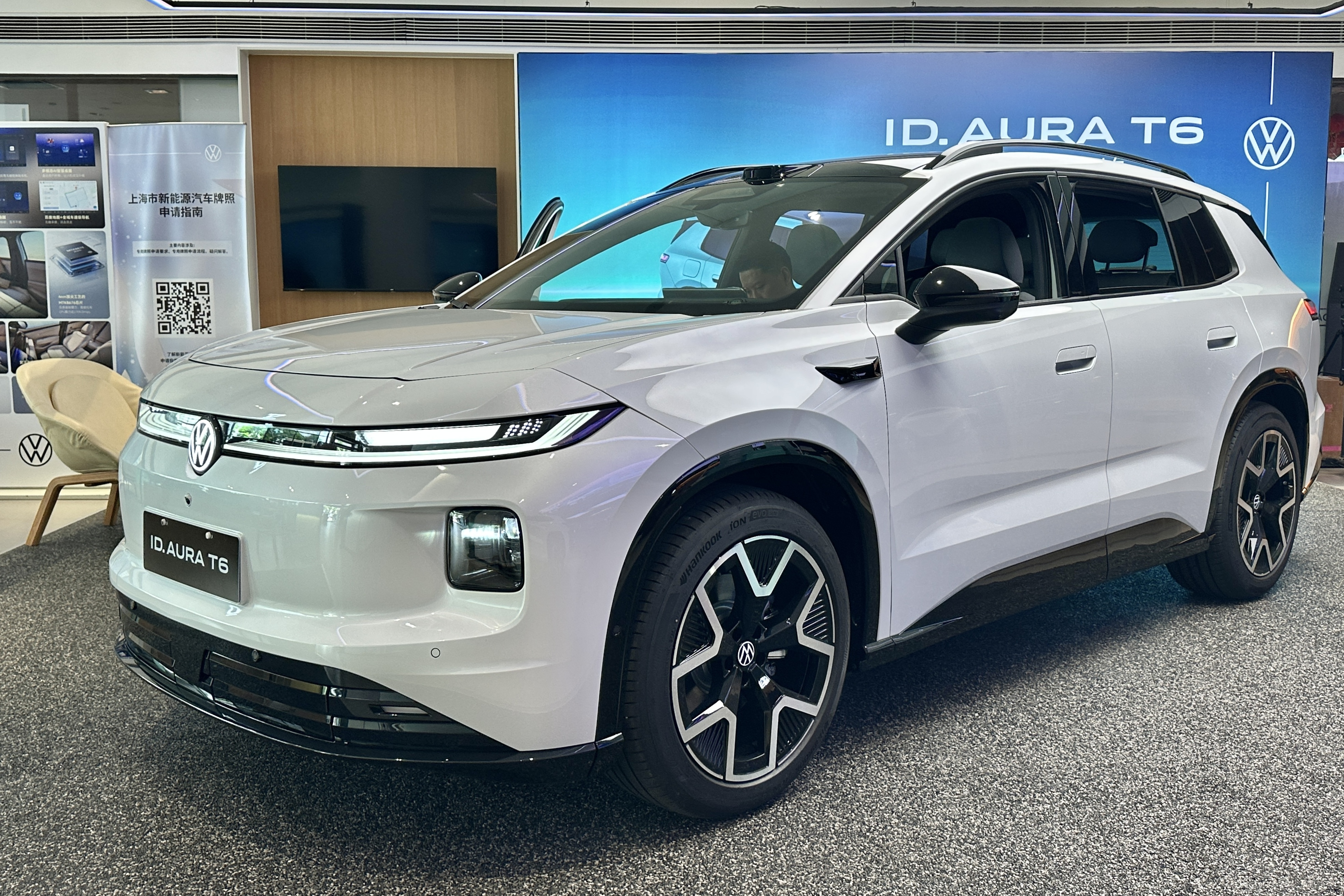
2026–present
大众ID. AURA T6
Volkswagen ID. Aura T6

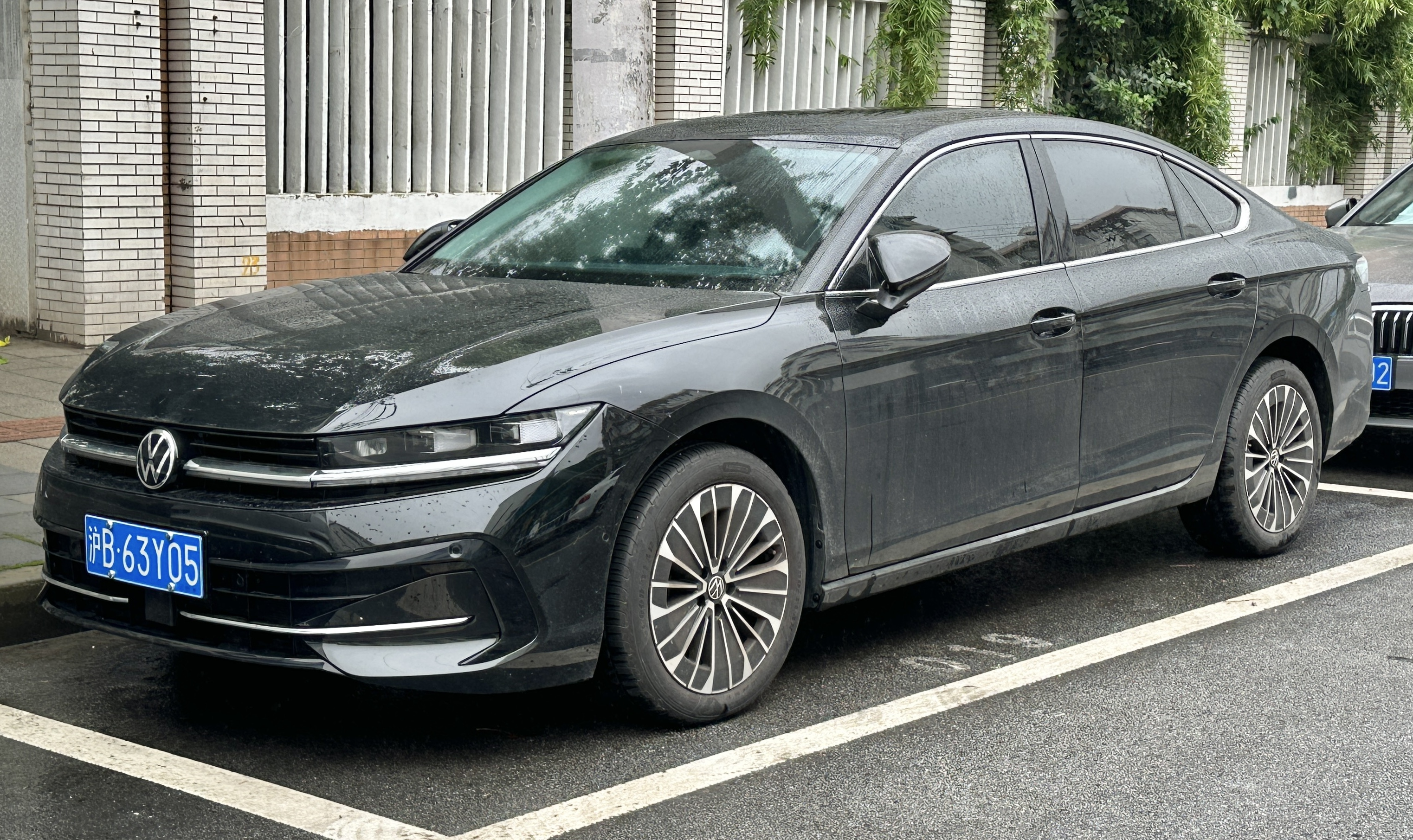
2024–present
大众迈腾B9
Volkswagen Magotan B9

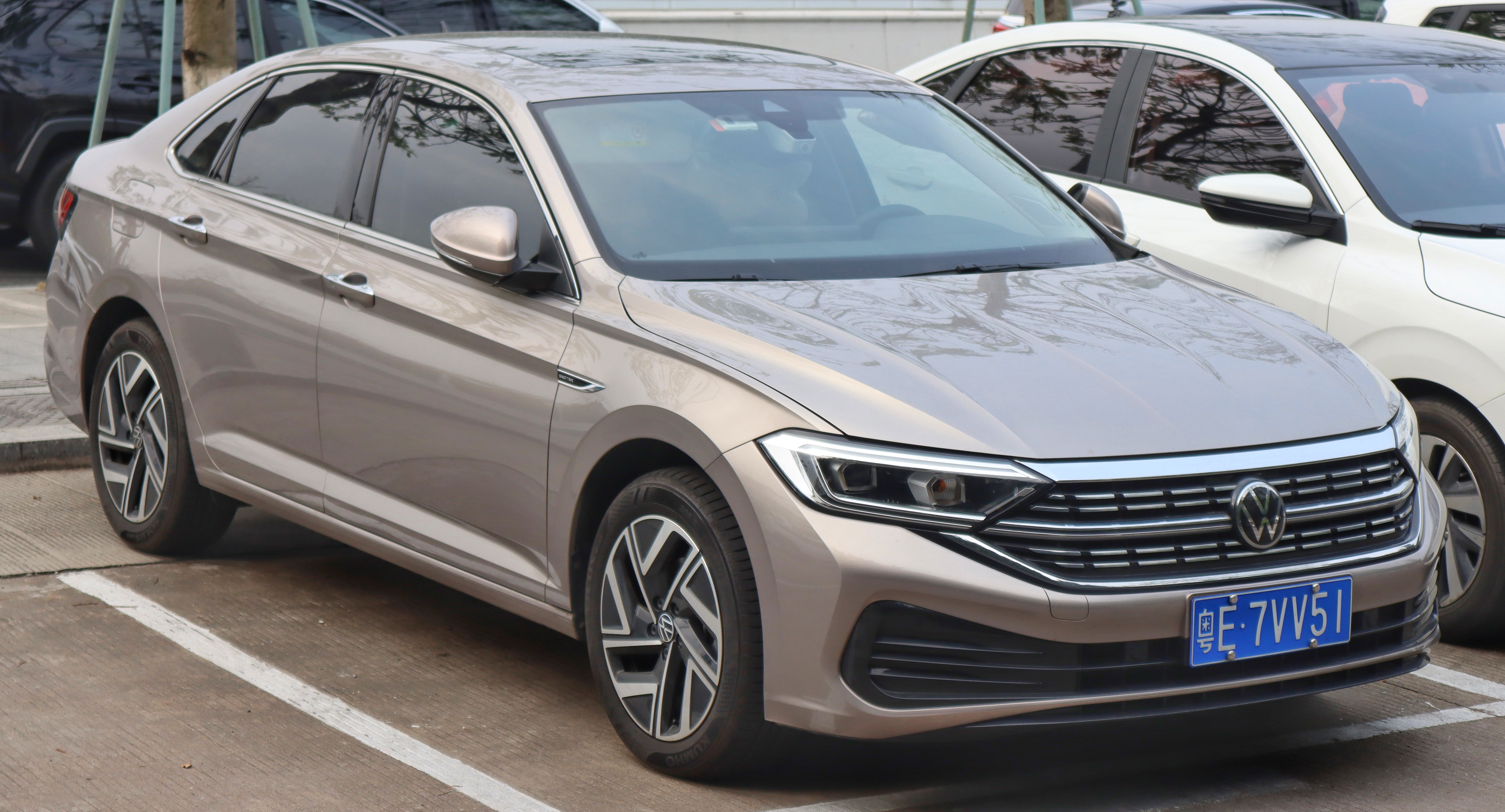
2019–present
大众速腾A7
Volkswagen Sagitar A7

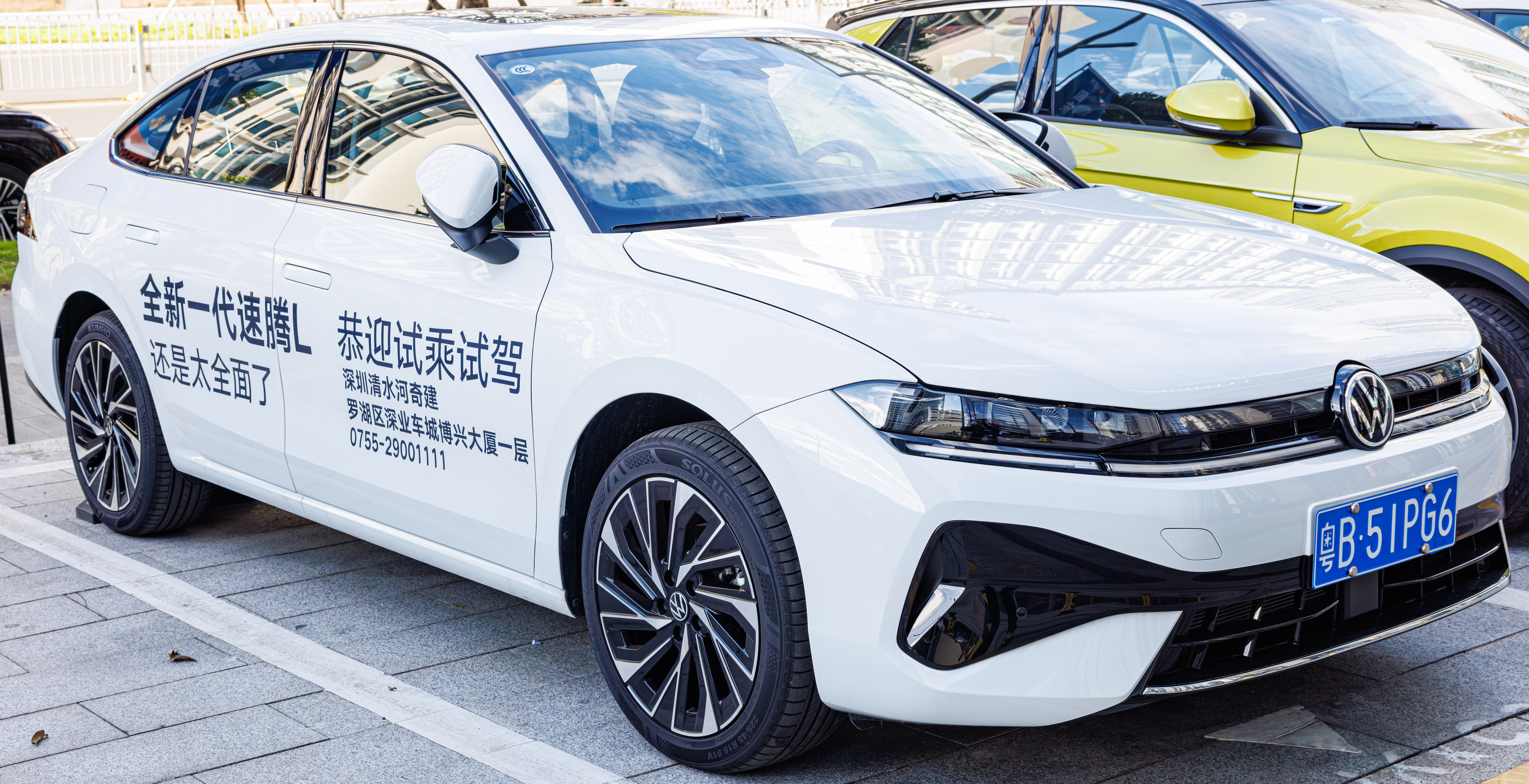
2025–present
大众速腾L
Volkswagen Sagitar L

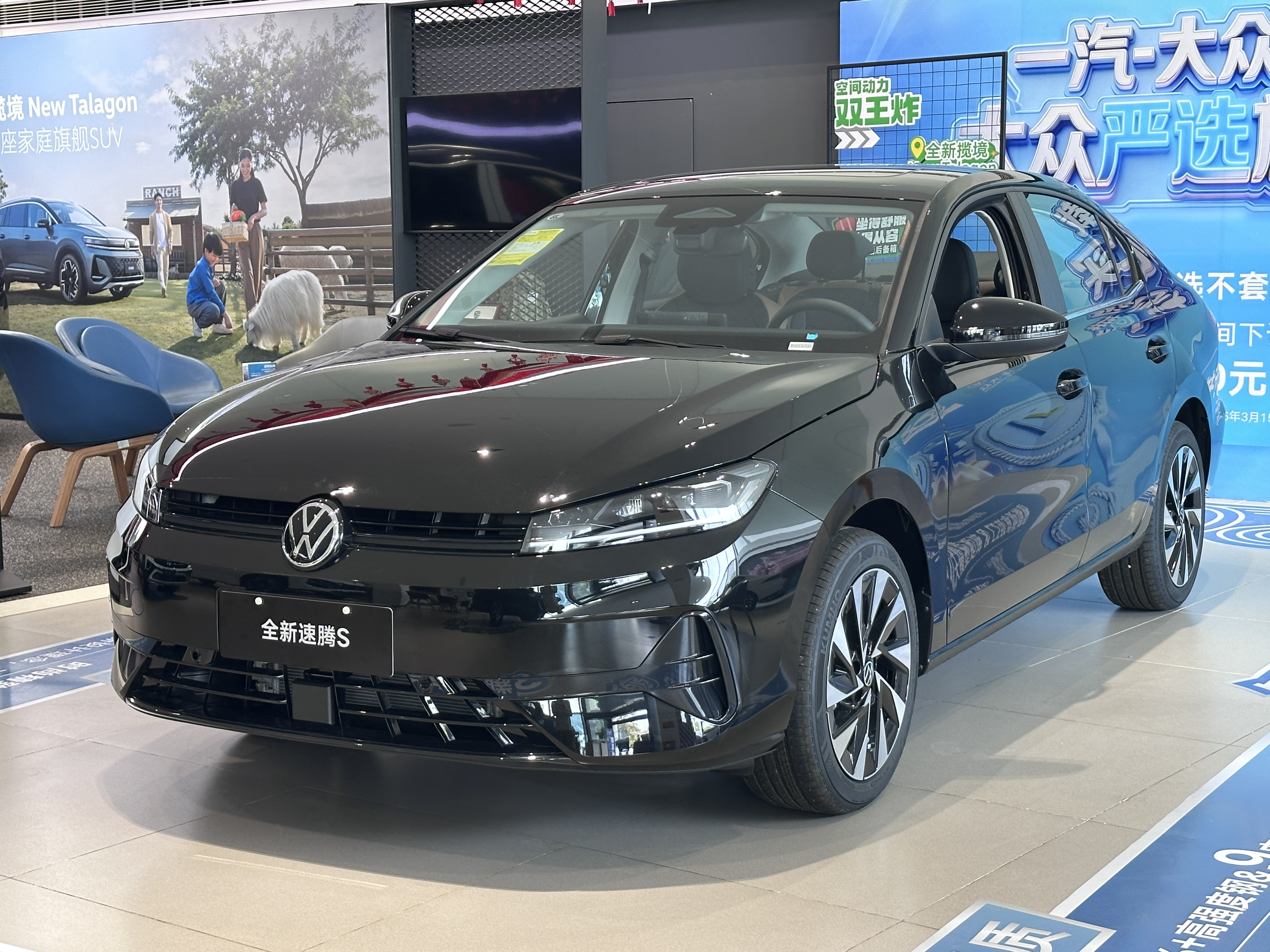
2026–present
大众速腾S
Volkswagen Sagitar S

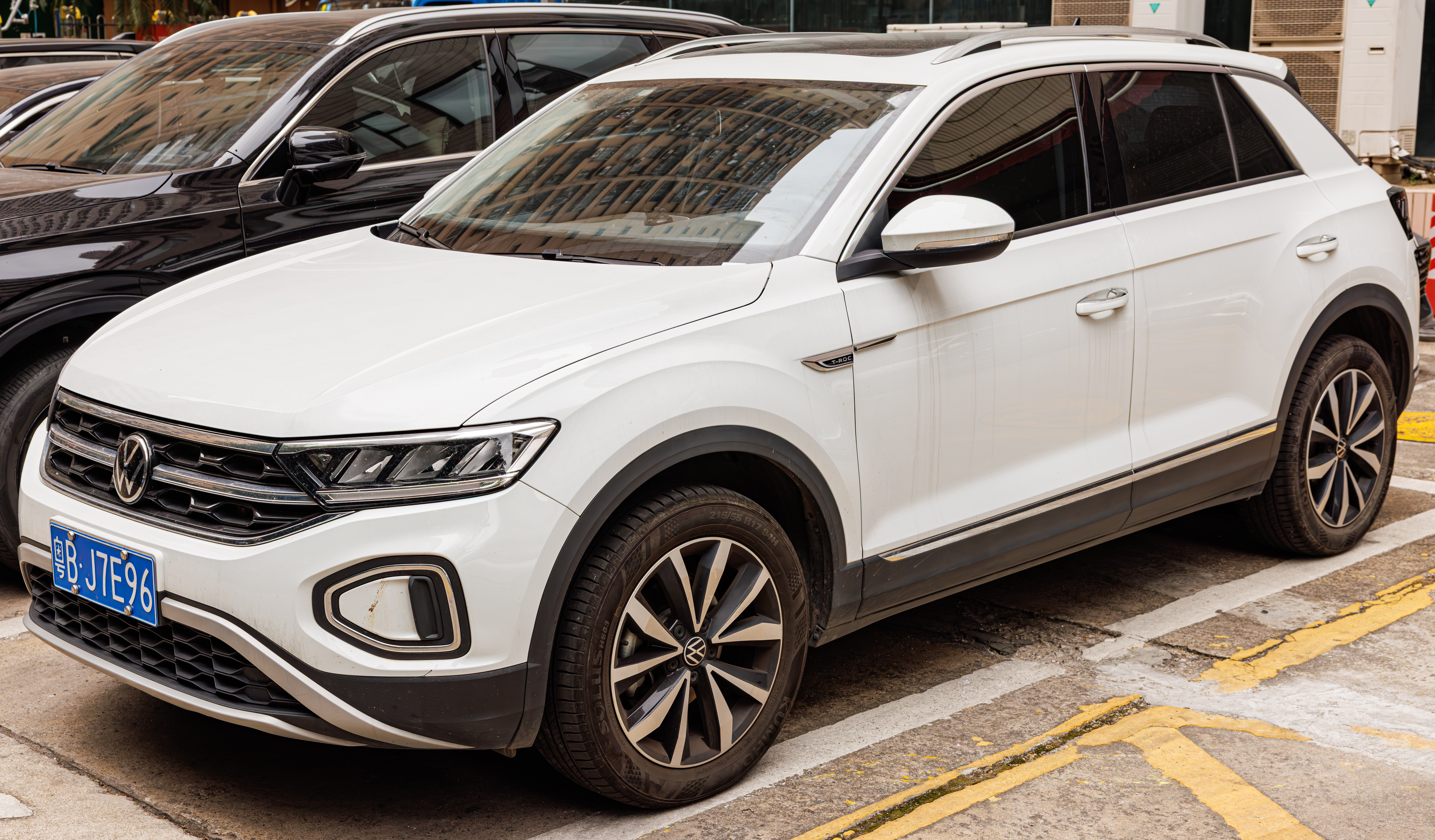
2018–present
大众探歌
Volkswagen T-Roc

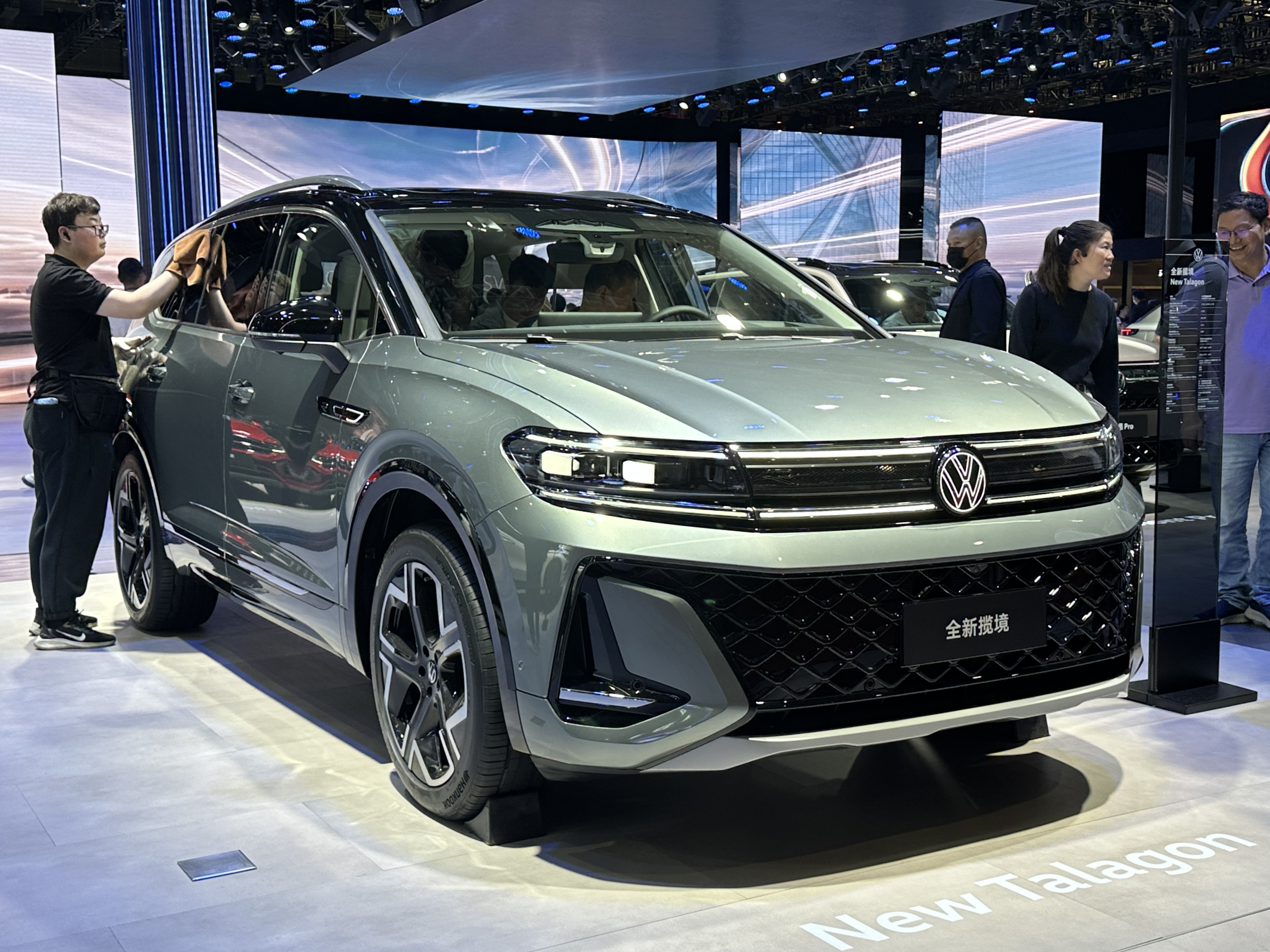
2021–present
大众揽境
Volkswagen Talagon

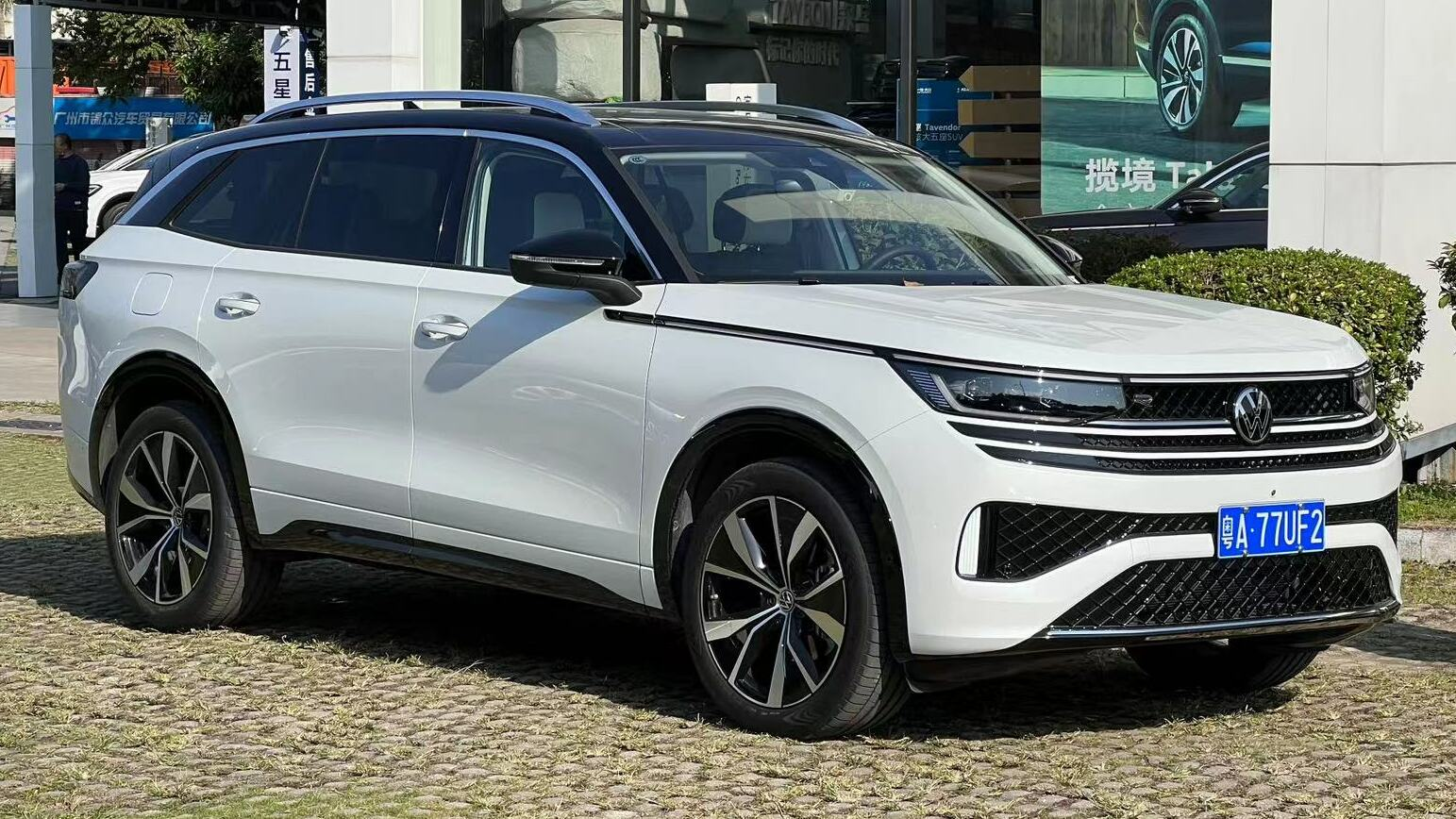
2022–present
大众揽巡
Volkswagen Tavendor

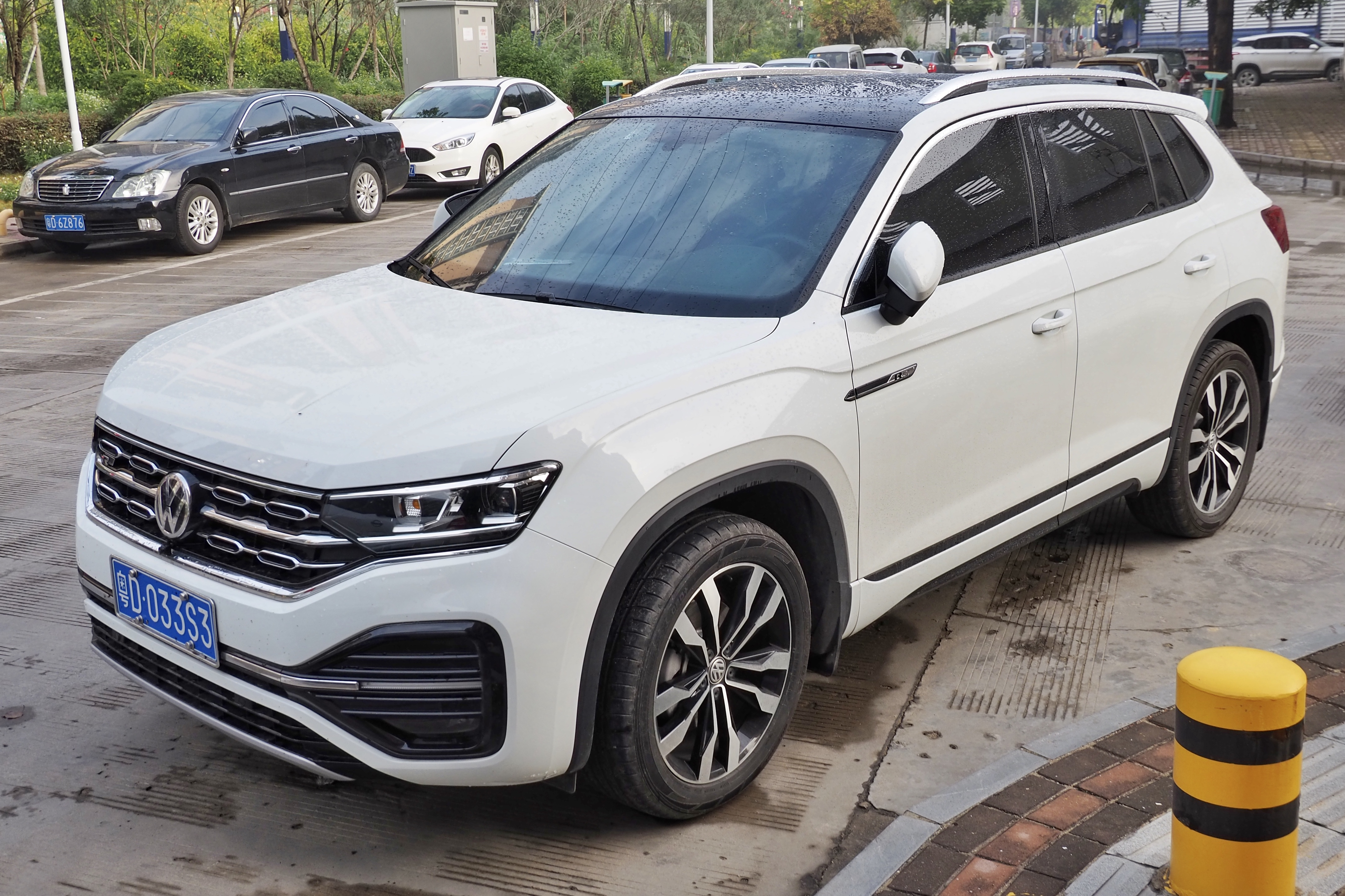
2018–present
大众探岳
Volkswagen Tayron

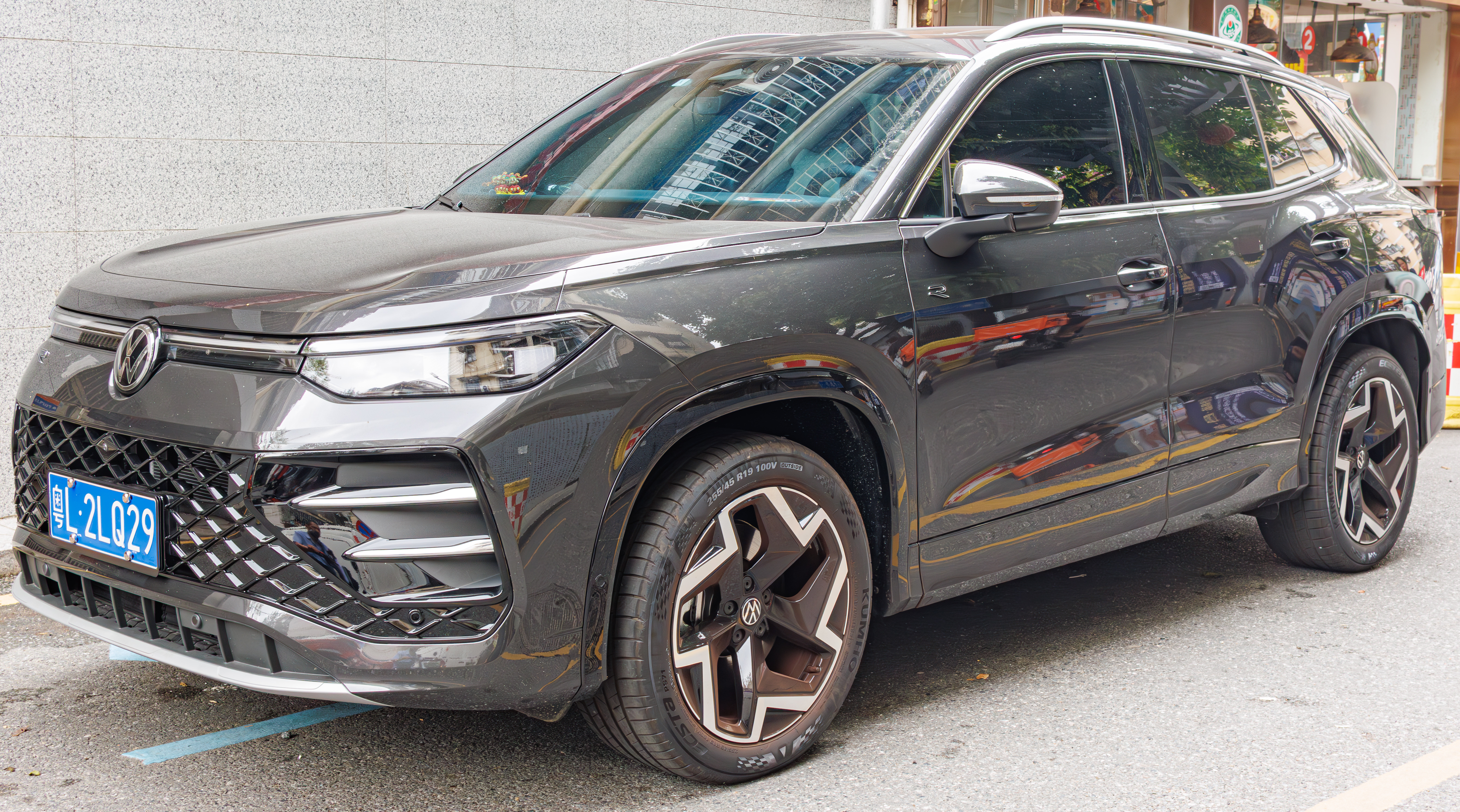
2025–present
大众探岳L
Volkswagen Tayron L

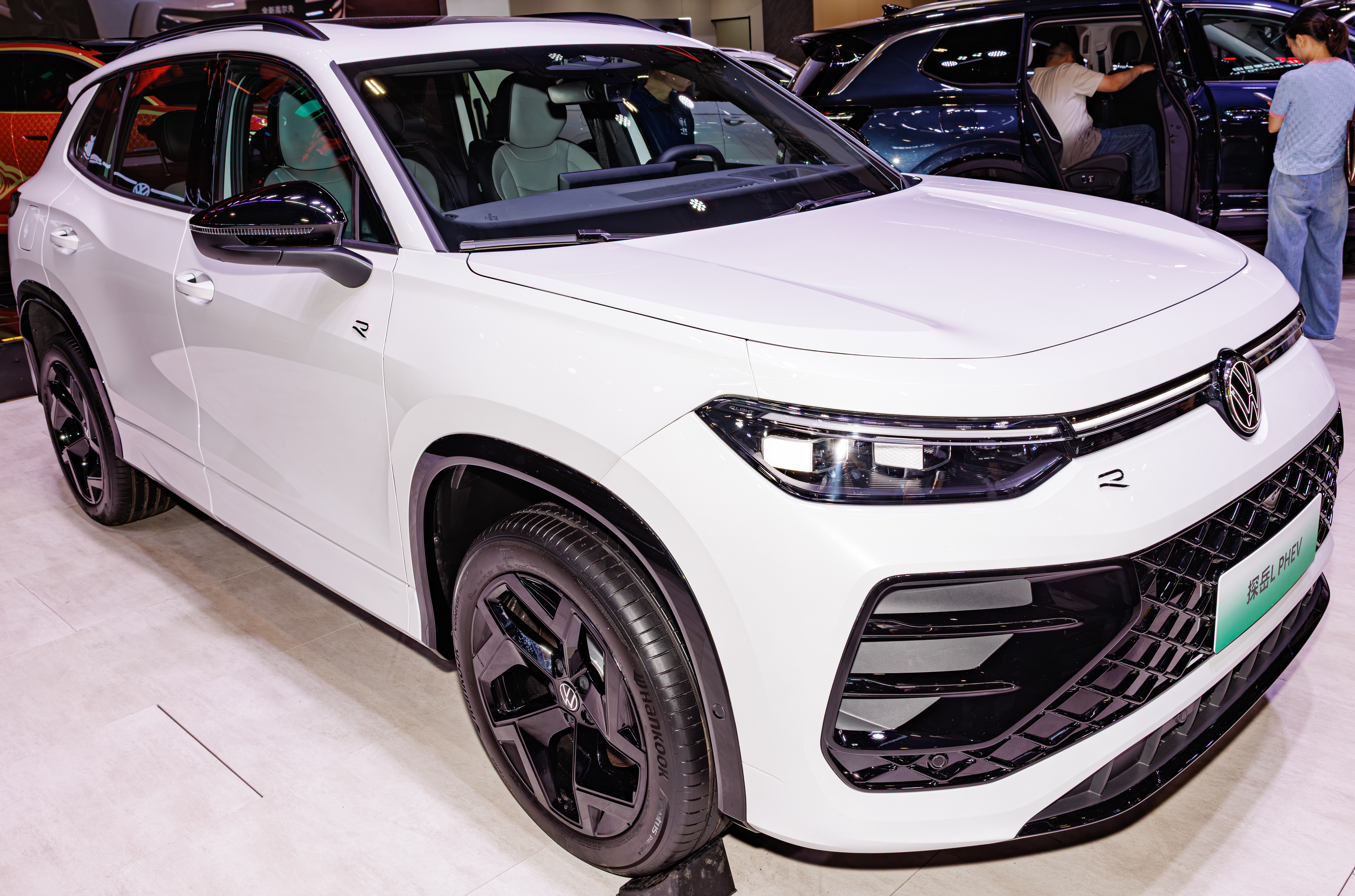
2026–present
大众探岳L PHEV
Volkswagen Tayron L PHEV

== Former products ==
=== Audi ===
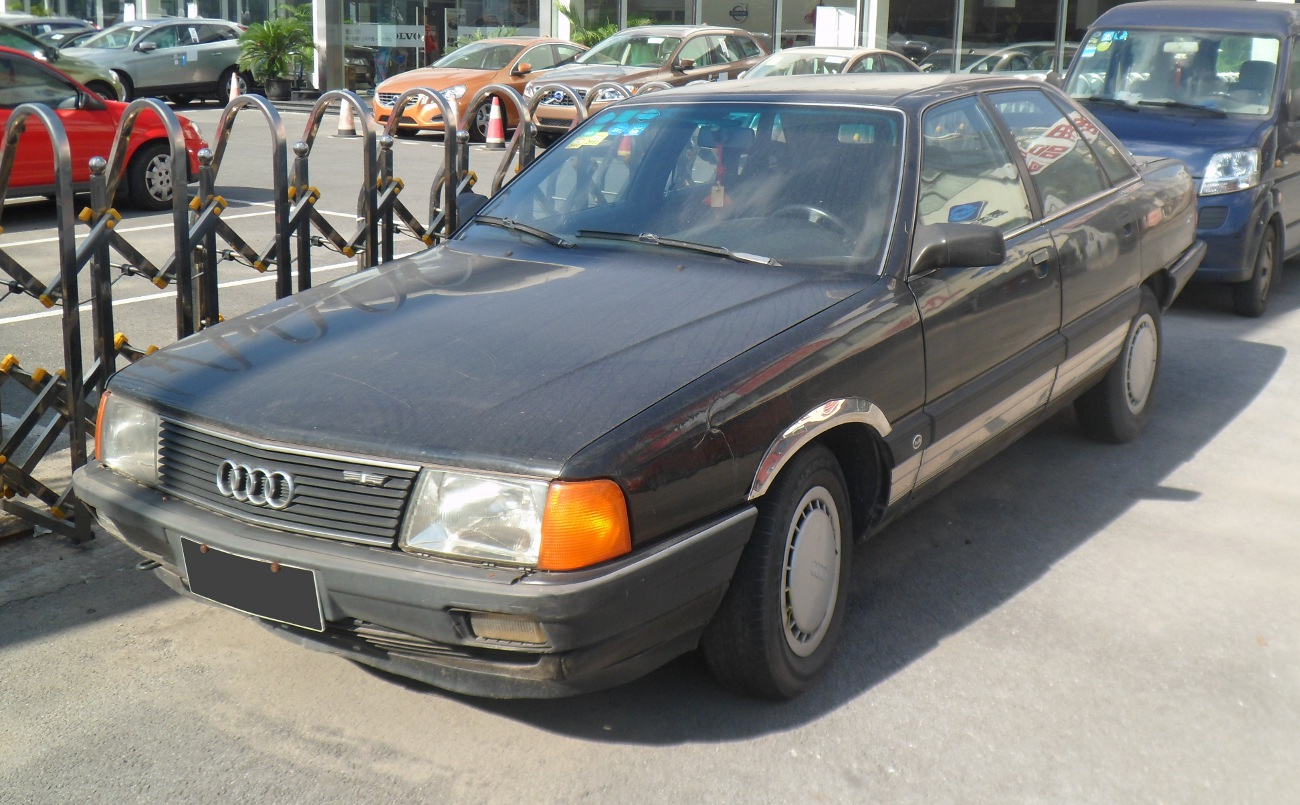
1988–1999
奥迪100 C3
Audi 100 C3

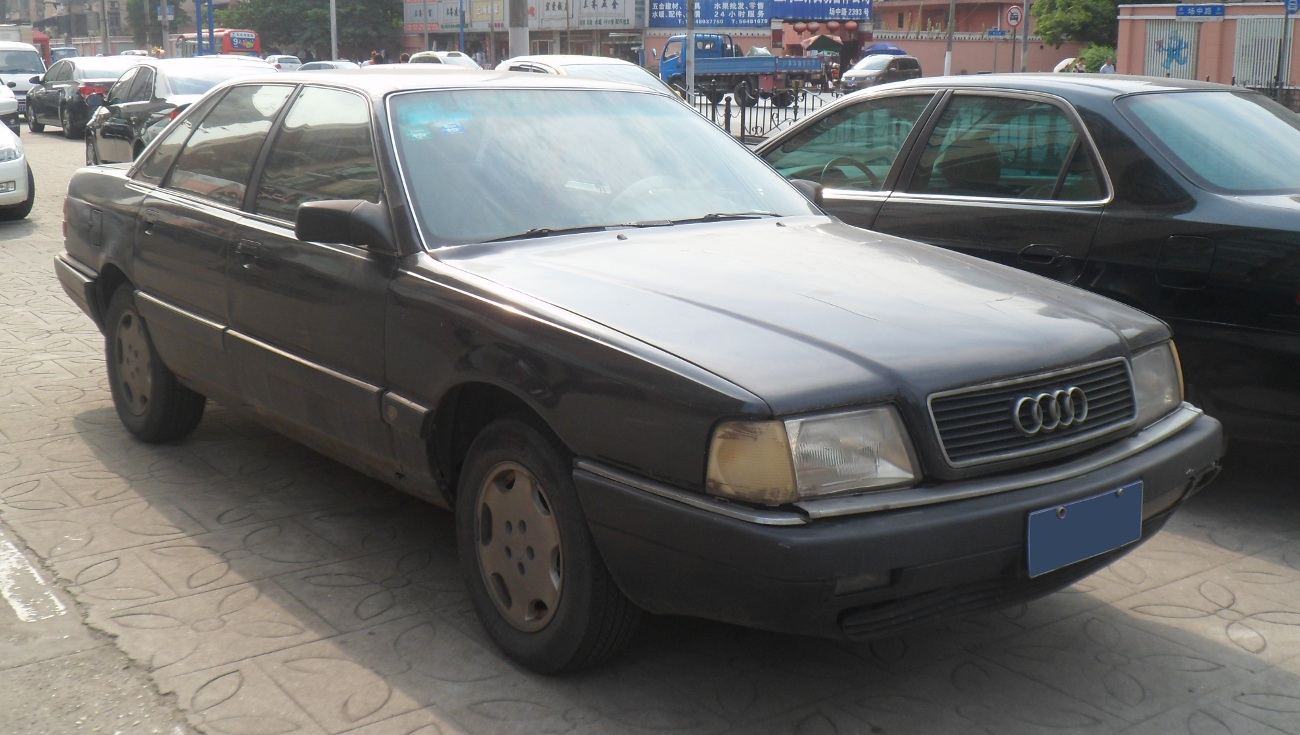
1996–1999
奥迪200 C3
Audi 200 C3

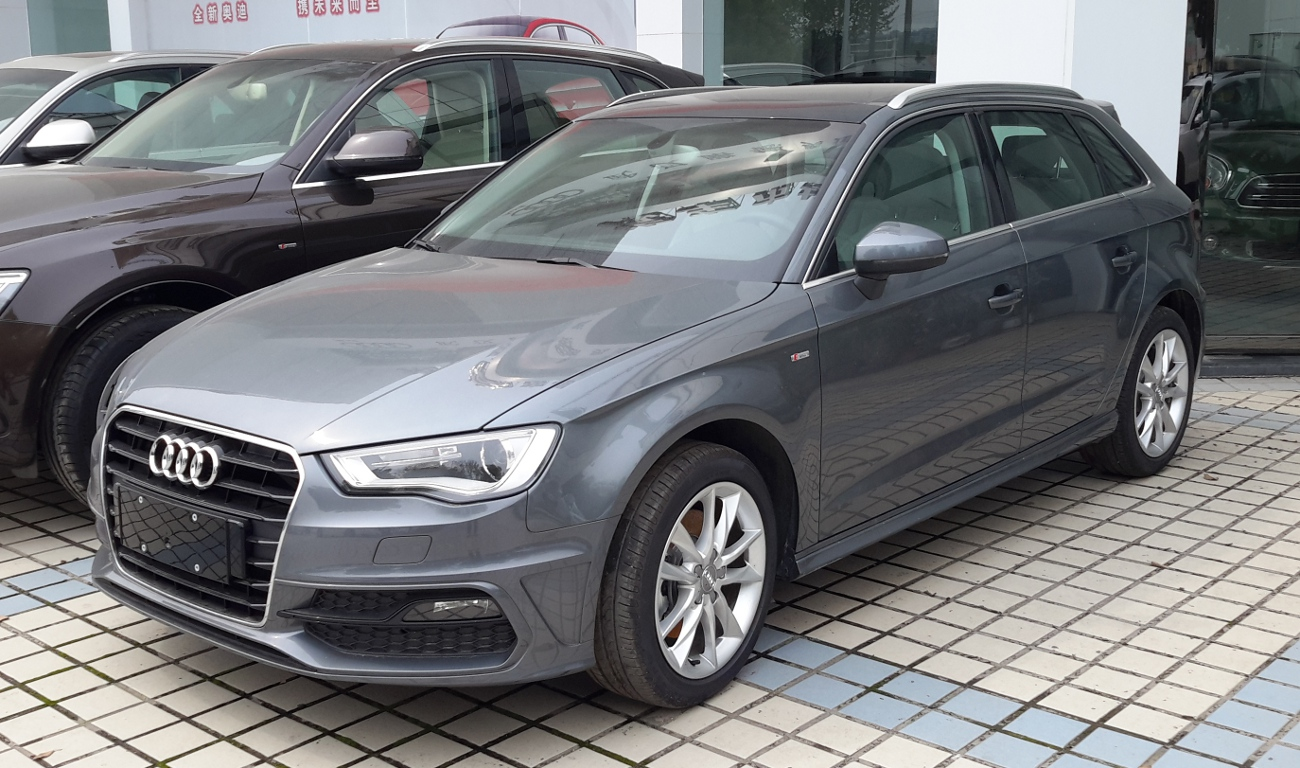
2014–2020
奥迪A3
Audi A3 8V Sportback

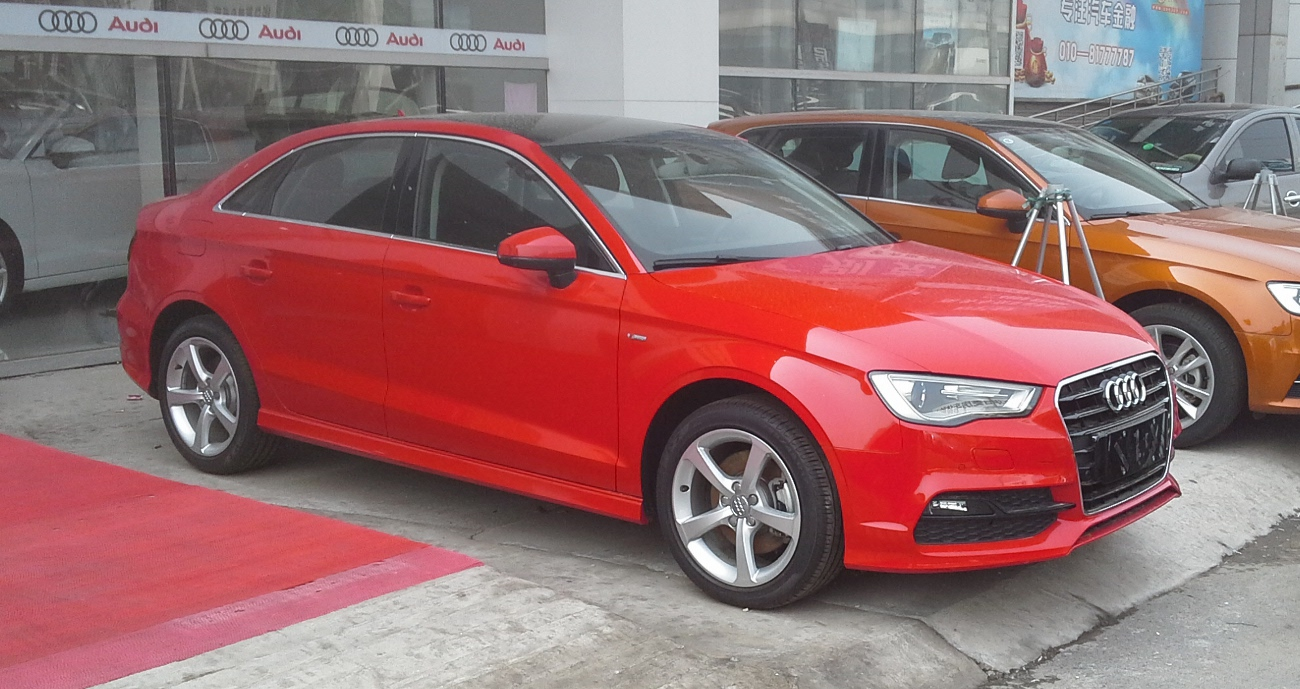
2014–2020
奥迪A3
Audi A3 8V Sedan

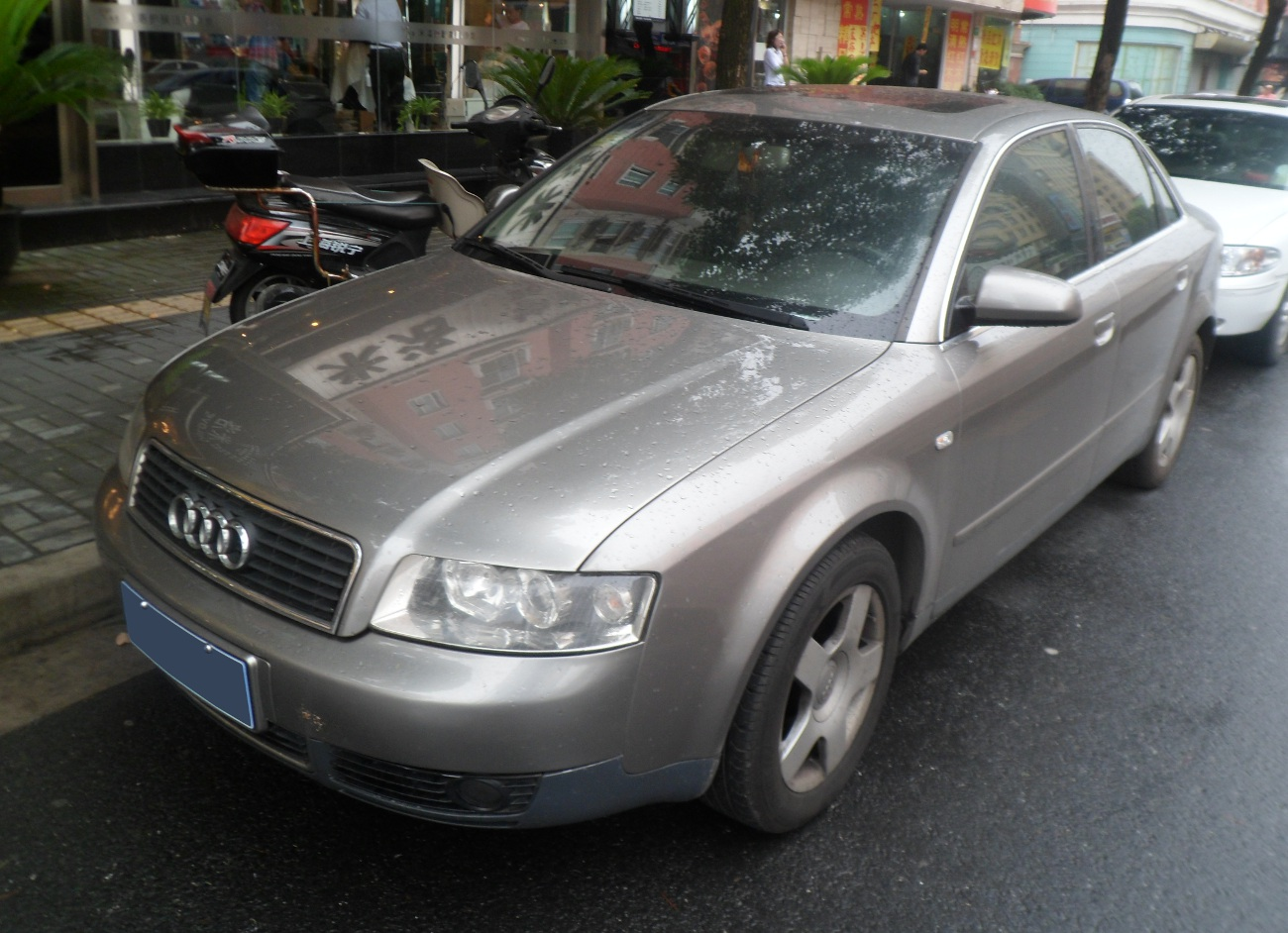
2003–2006
奥迪A4 B6
Audi A4 B6

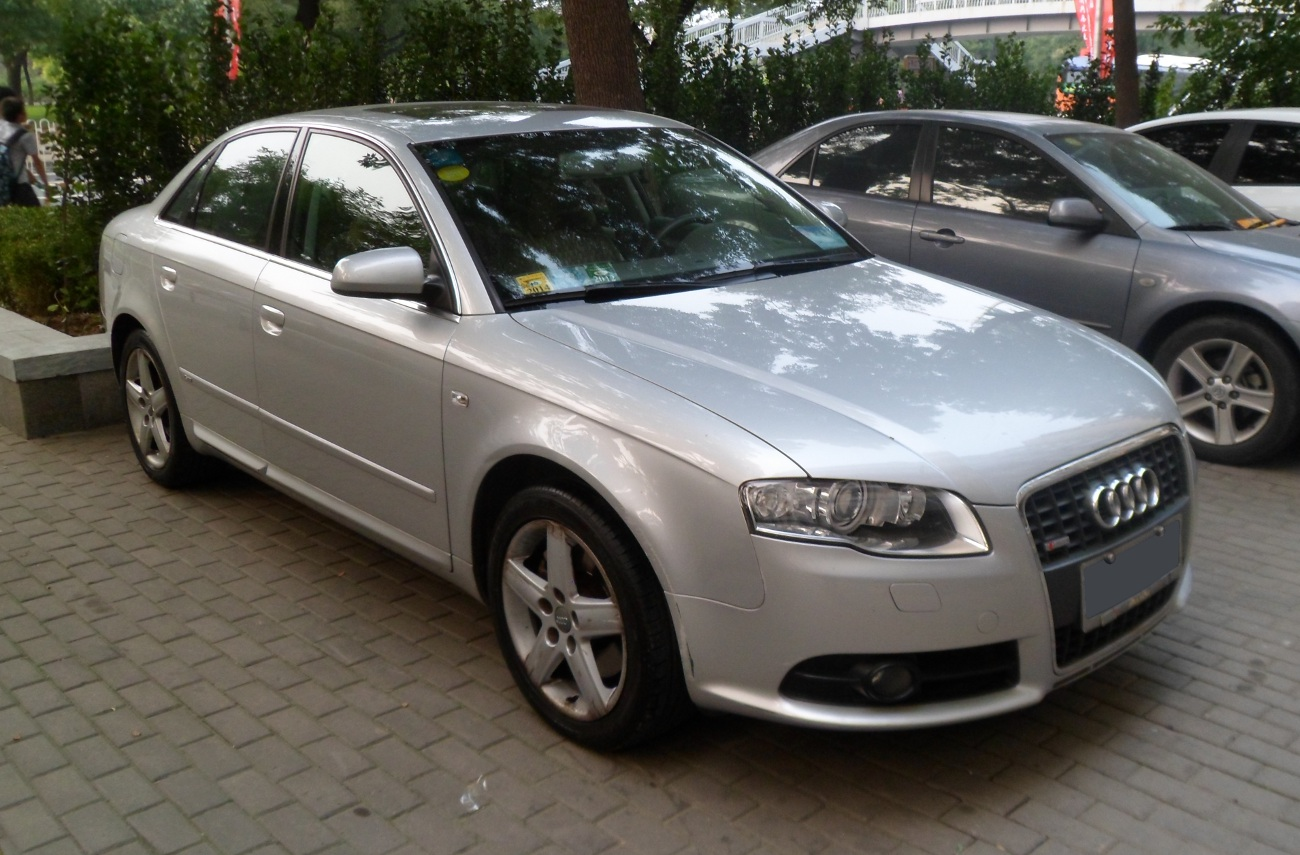
2006–2009
奥迪A4 B7
Audi A4 B7

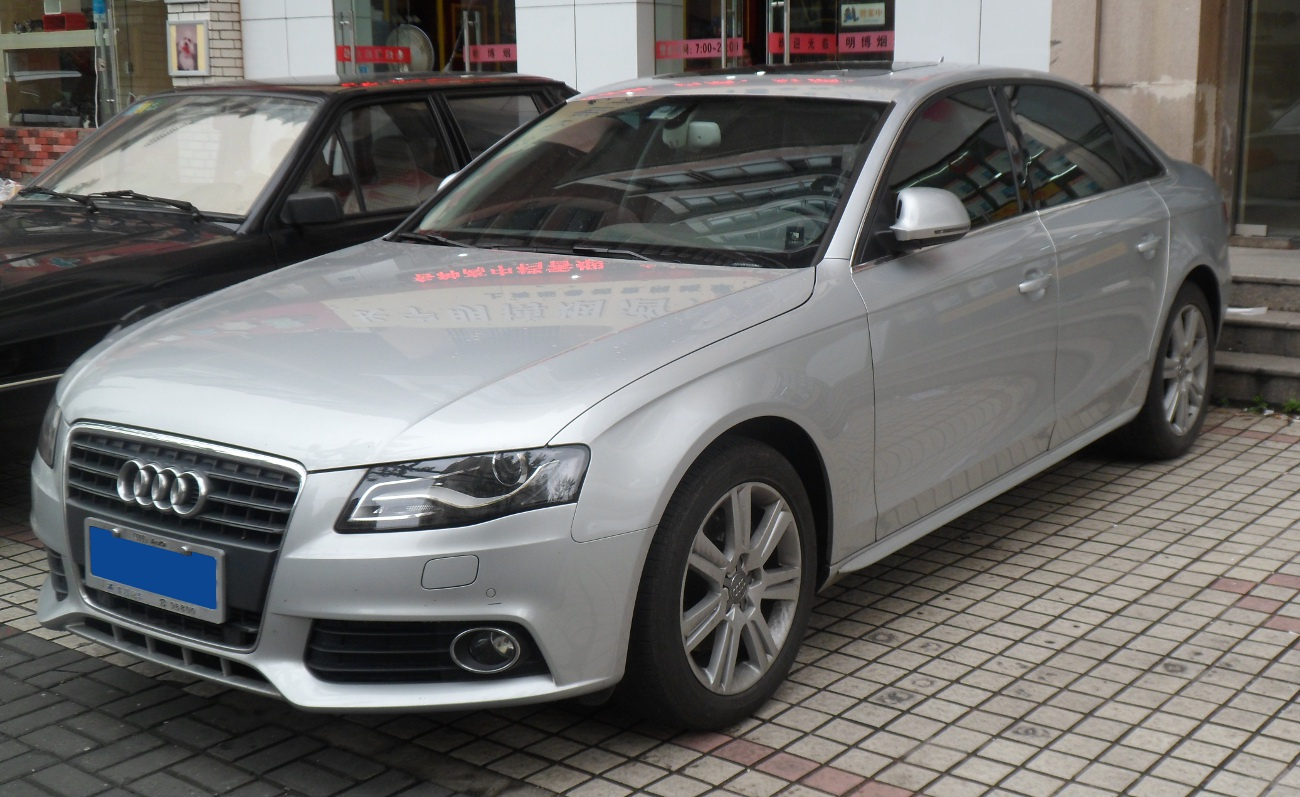
2009–2012
奥迪A4L B8
Audi A4L B8

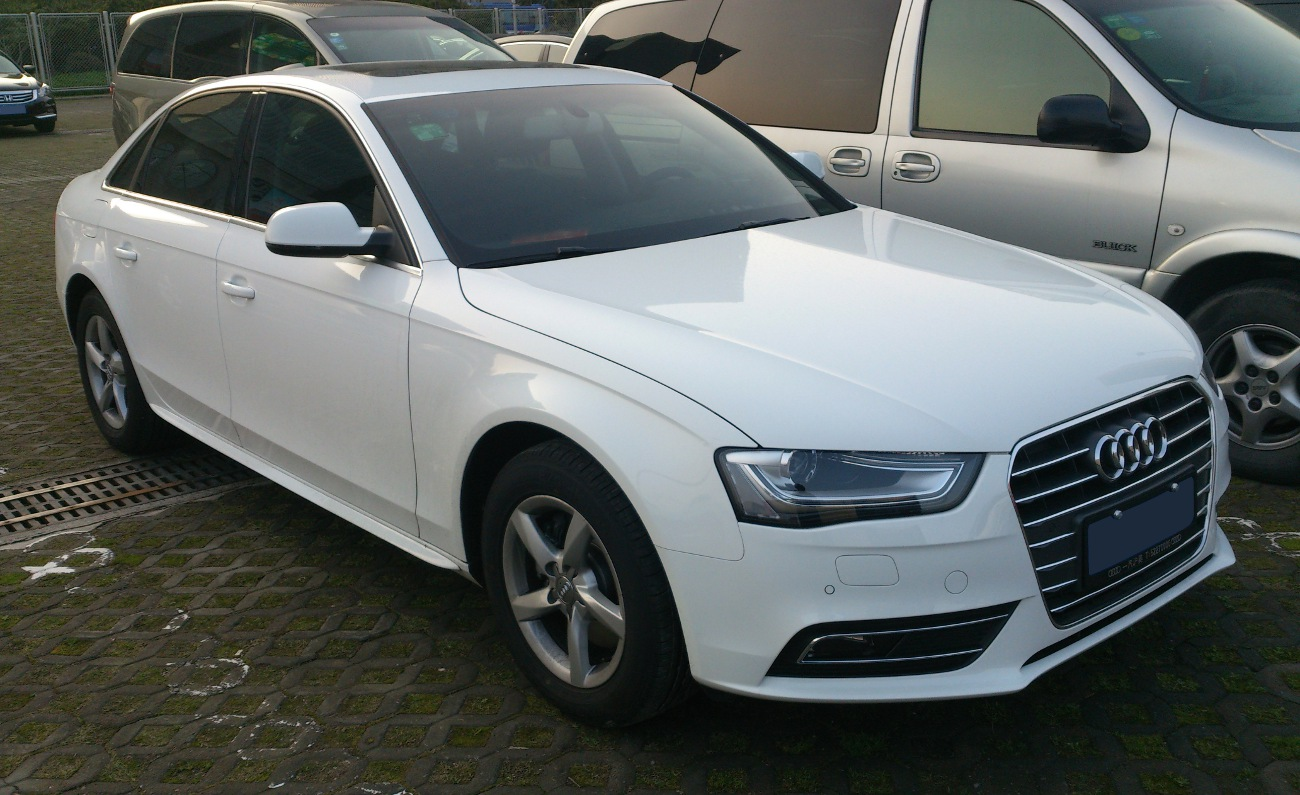
2012–2016
奥迪A4L 8K
Audi A4L 8K

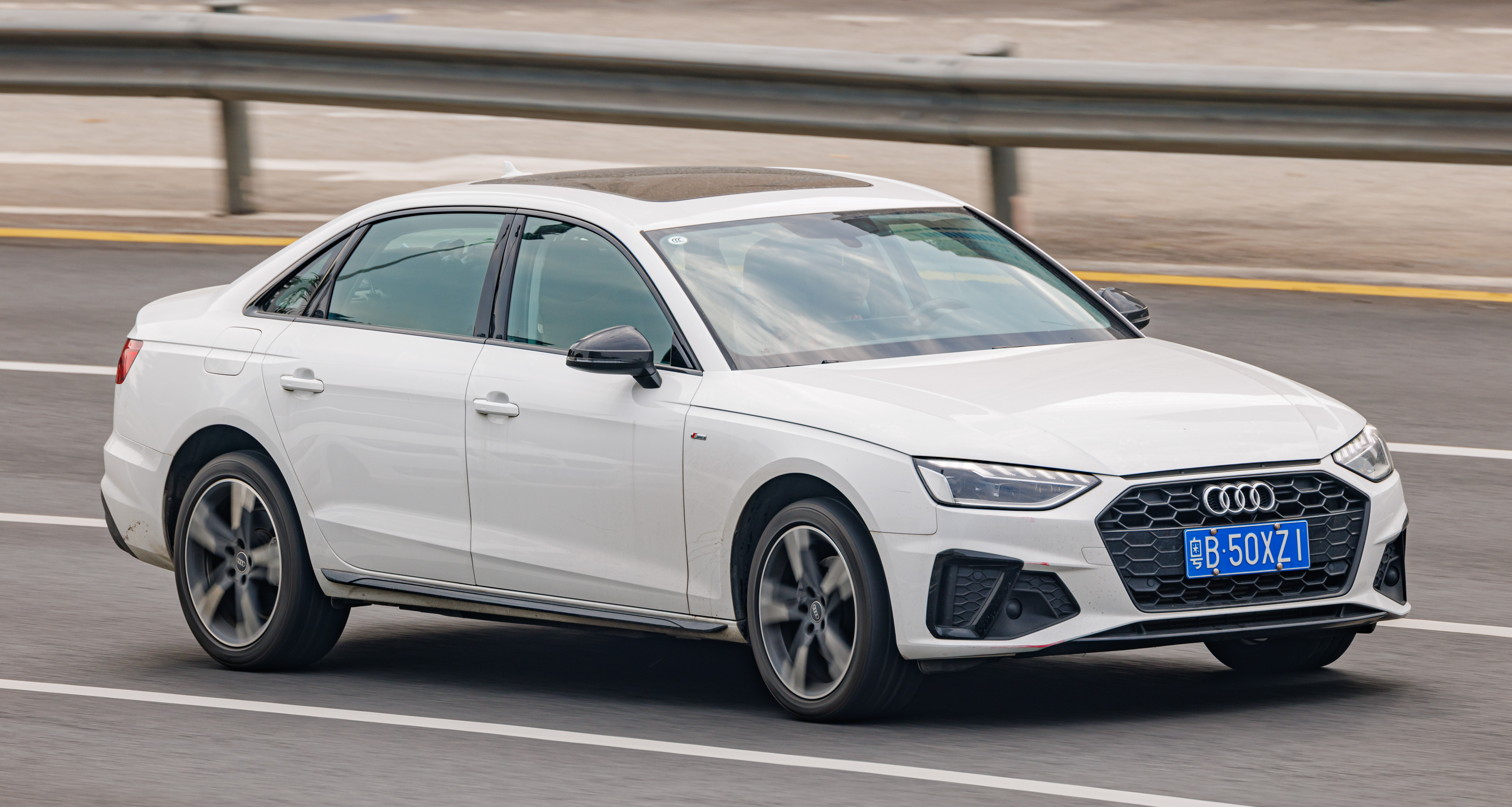
2016–2025
奥迪A4L
Audi A4L B9

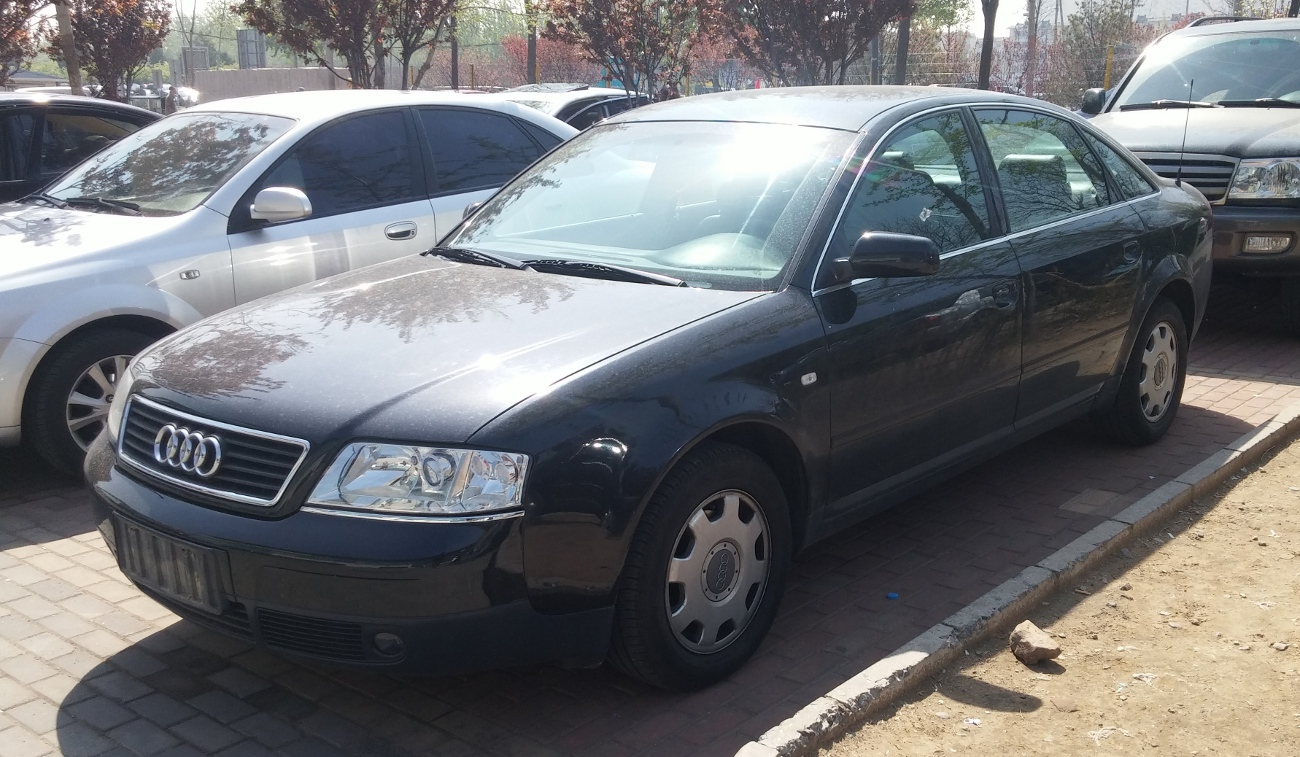
2000–2006
奥迪A6 C5
Audi A6 C5

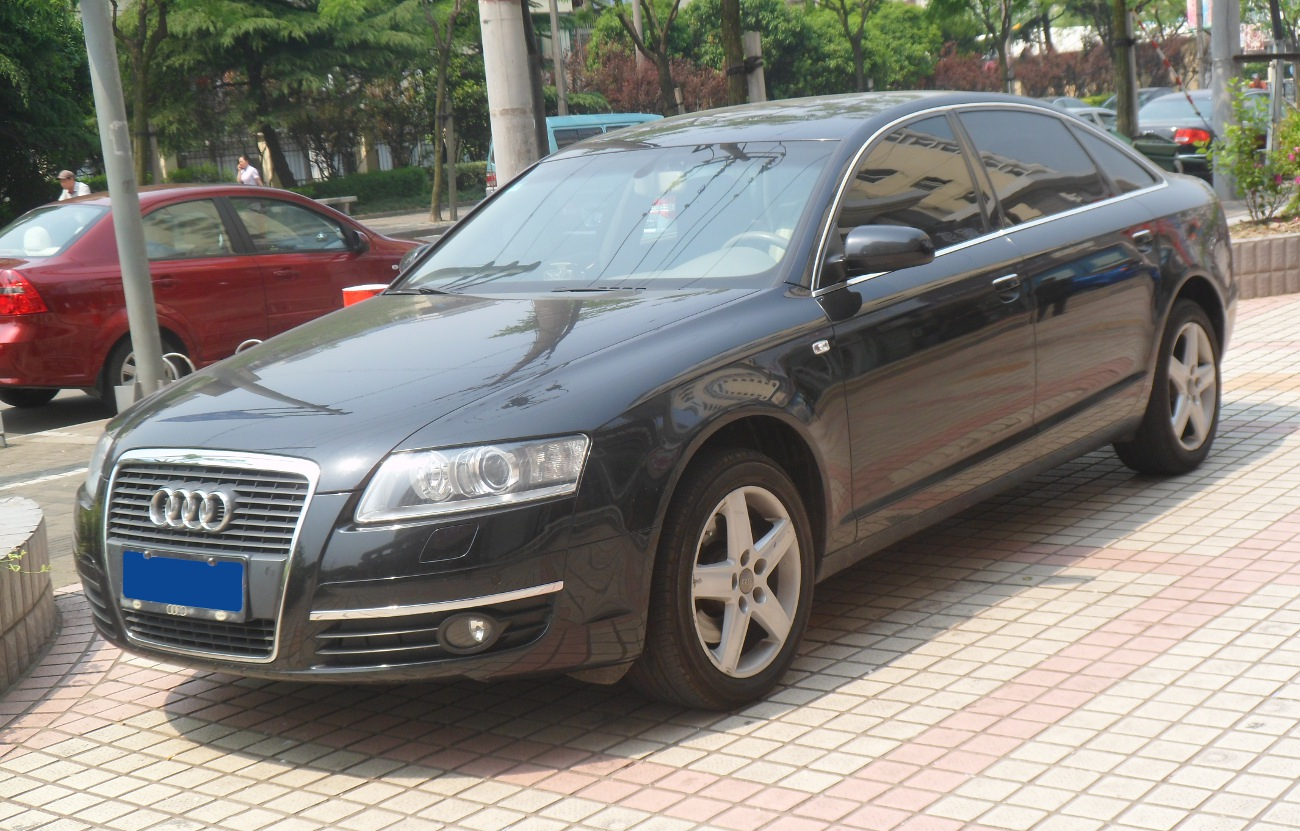
2006–2009
奥迪A6L C6
Audi A6 C6

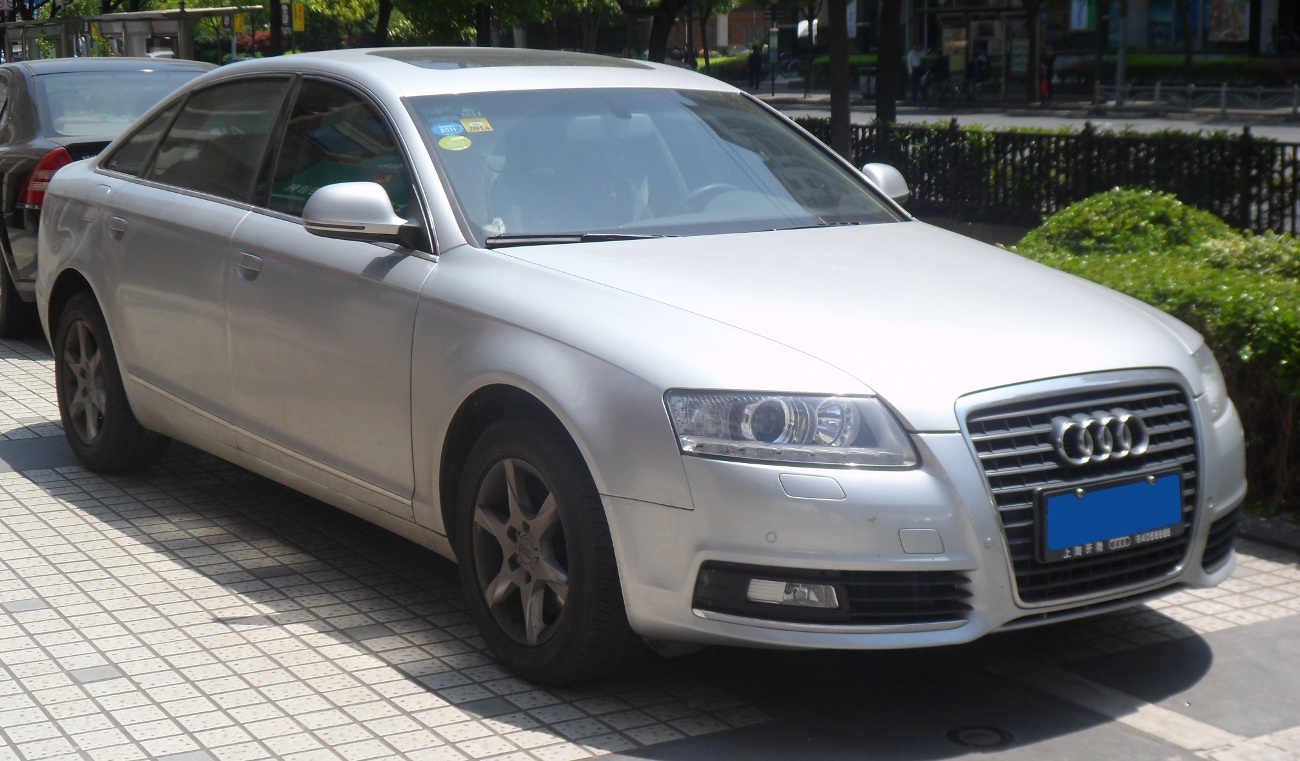
2009–2012
奥迪A6L 4F
Audi A6 4F

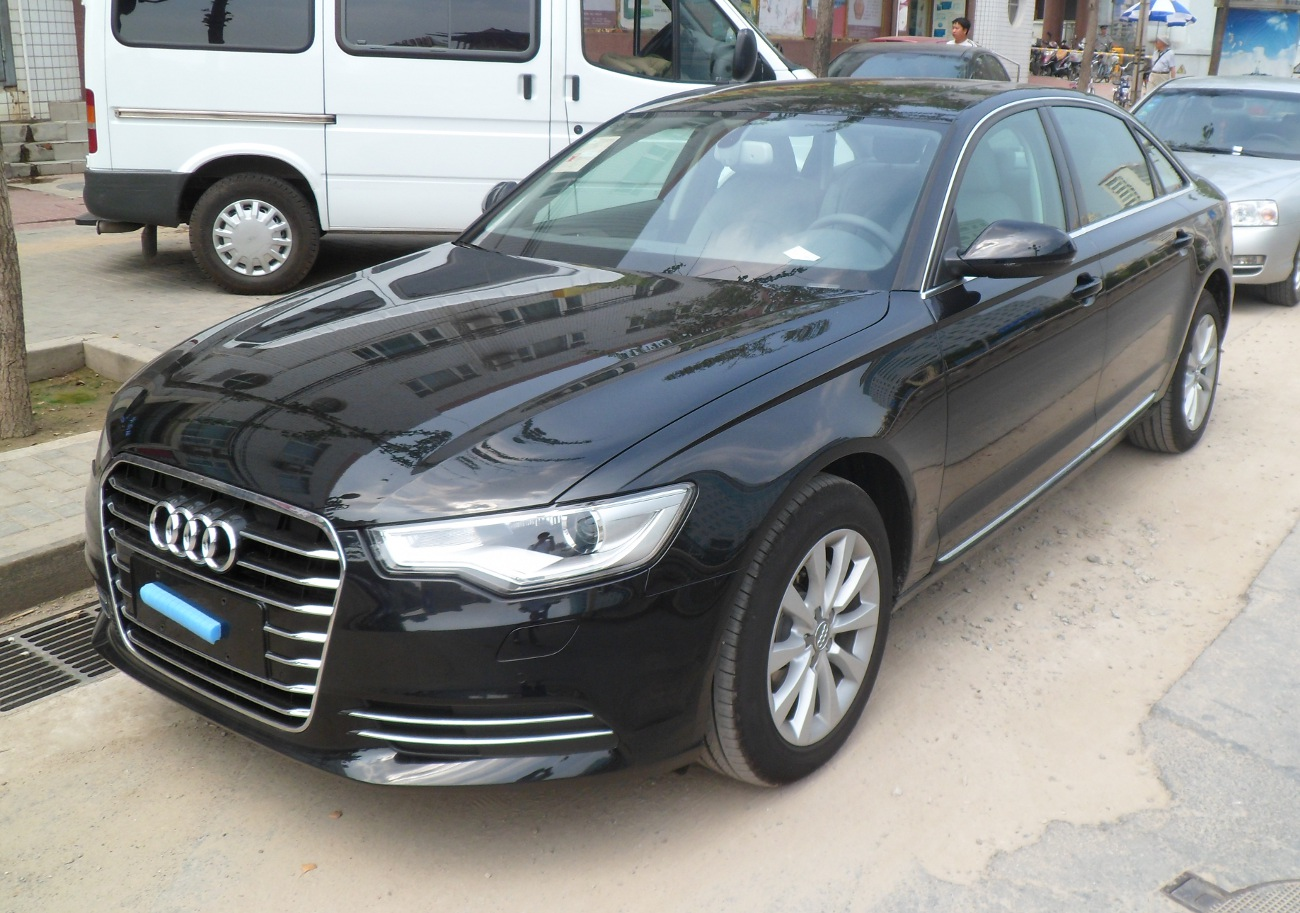
2012–2019
奥迪A6L C7
Audi A6L C7

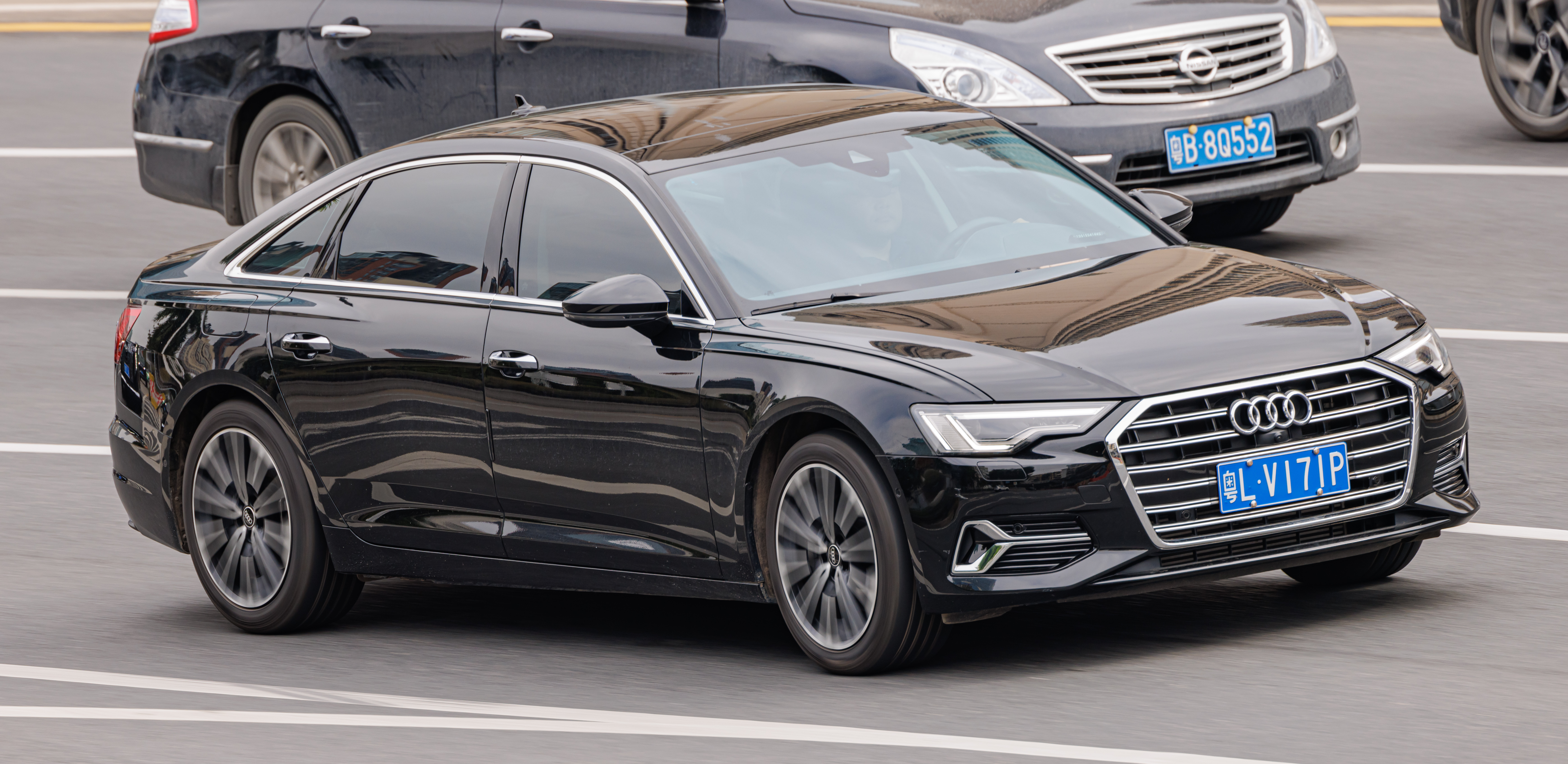
2019–2026
奥迪A6L
Audi A6L C8

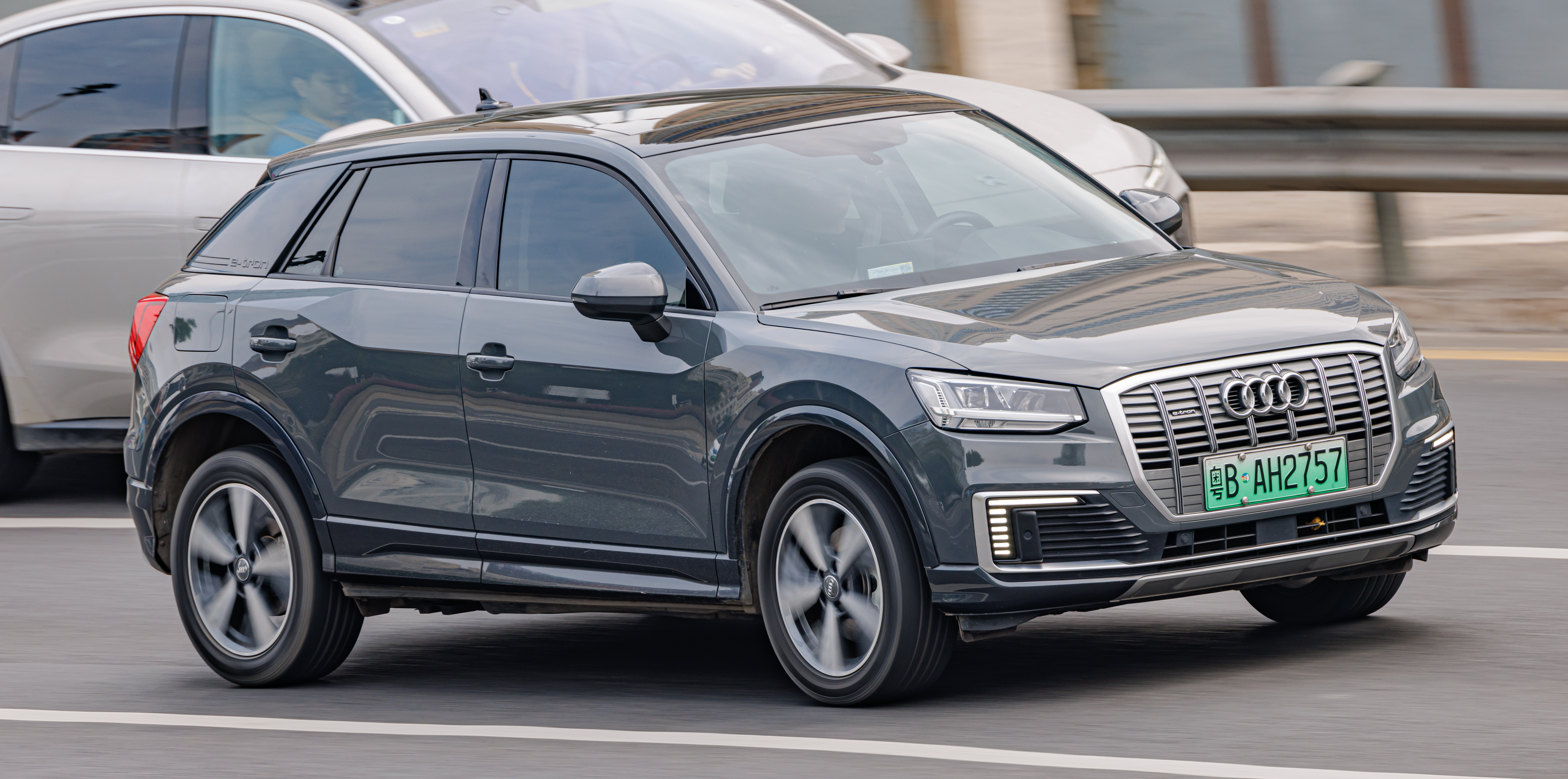
2019–2025
奥迪Q2L e-tron
Audi Q2L e-tron

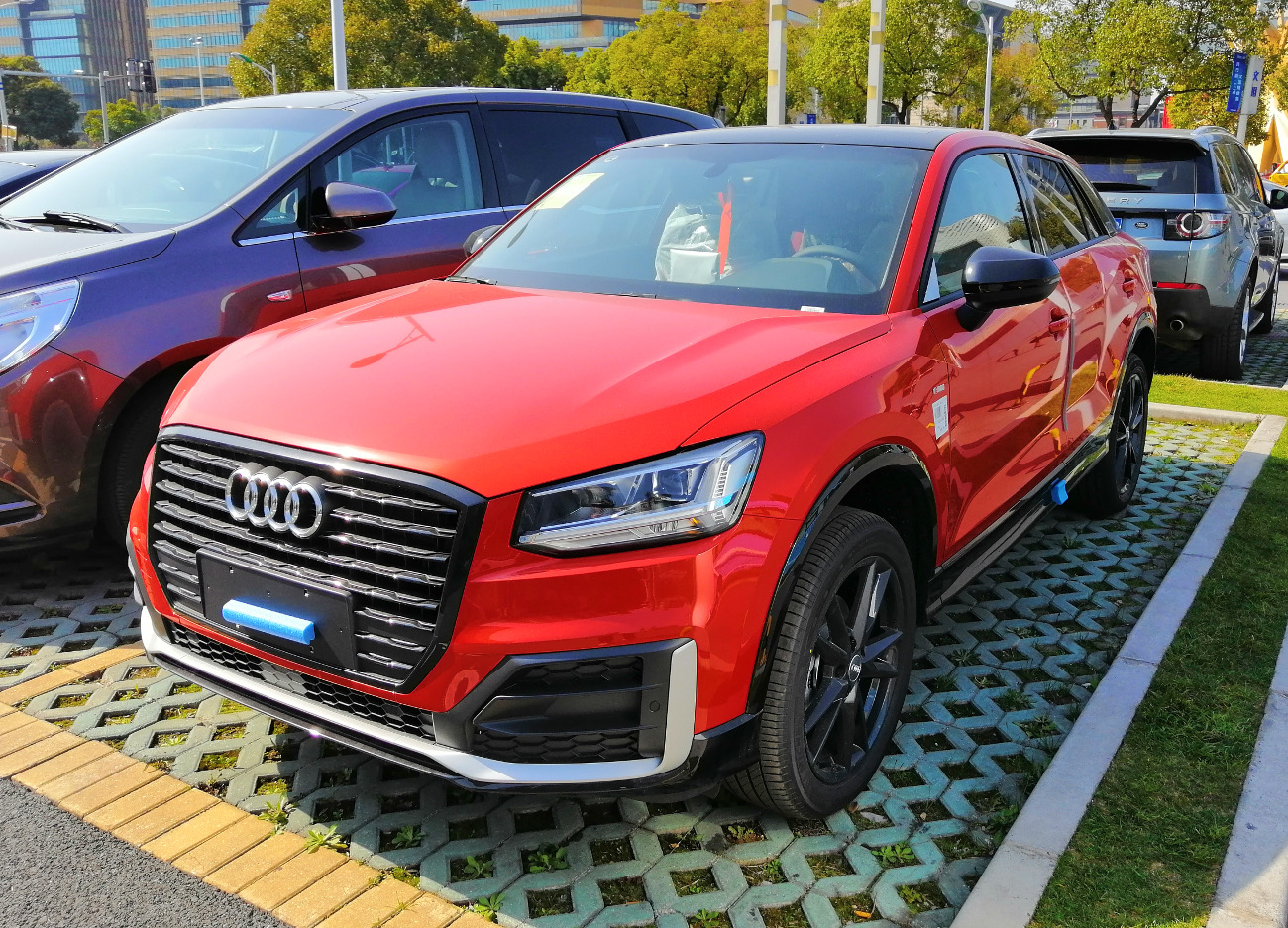
2018–2026
奥迪Q2L
Audi Q2L

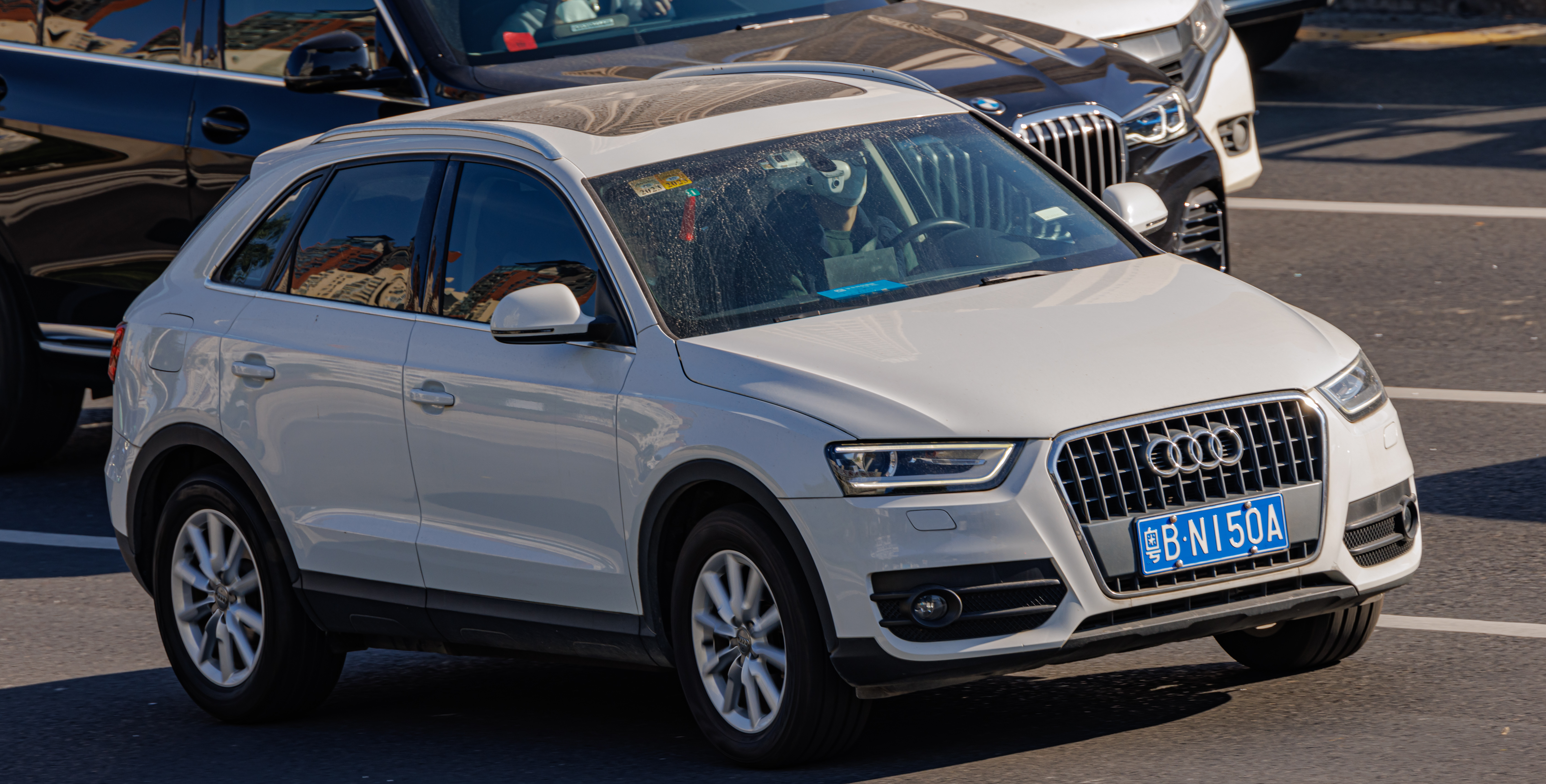
2013–2019
奥迪Q3
Audi Q3 8U

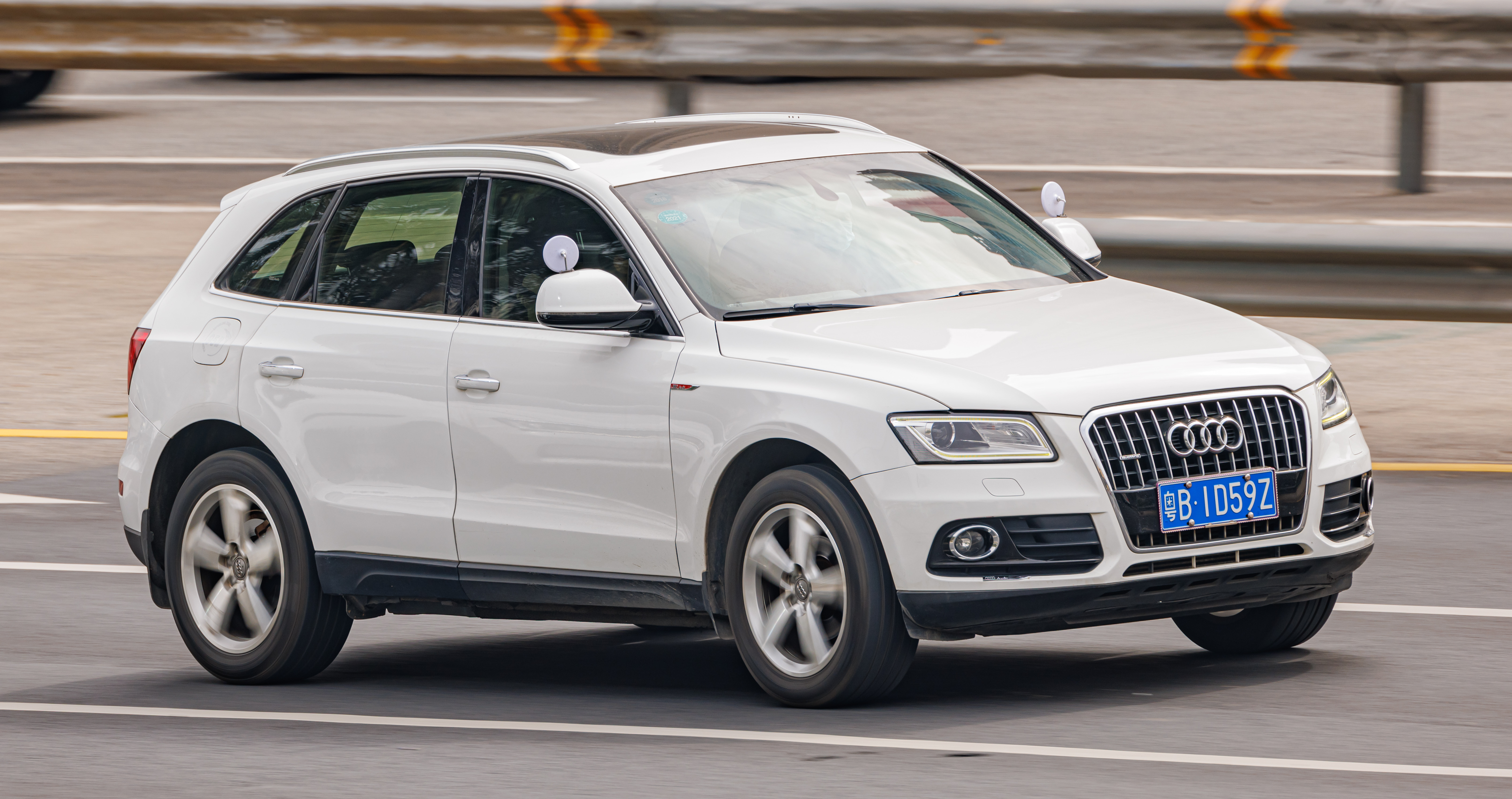
2010–2018
奥迪Q5
Audi Q5 8R

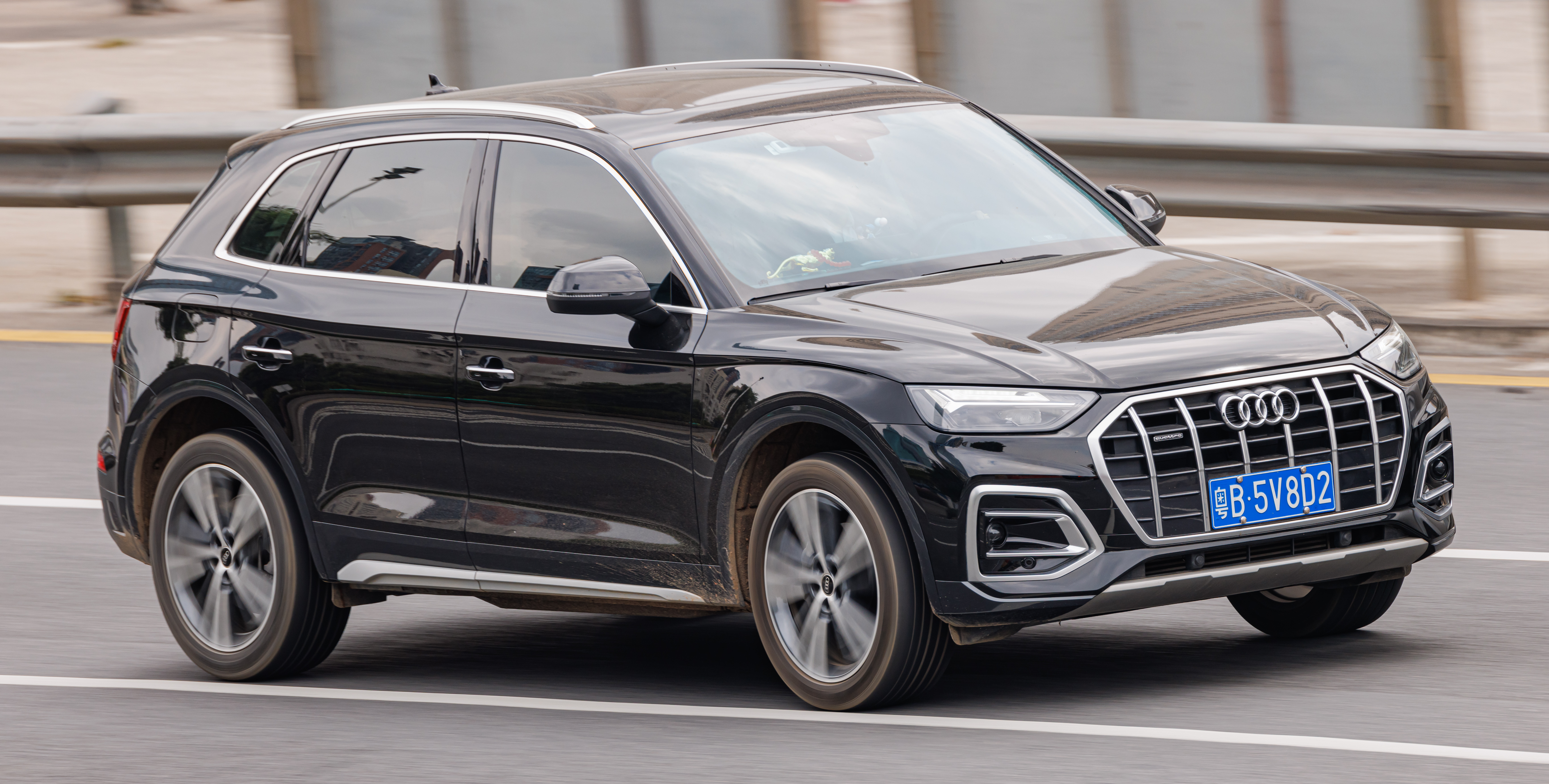
2018–2026
奥迪Q5L
Audi Q5L FY

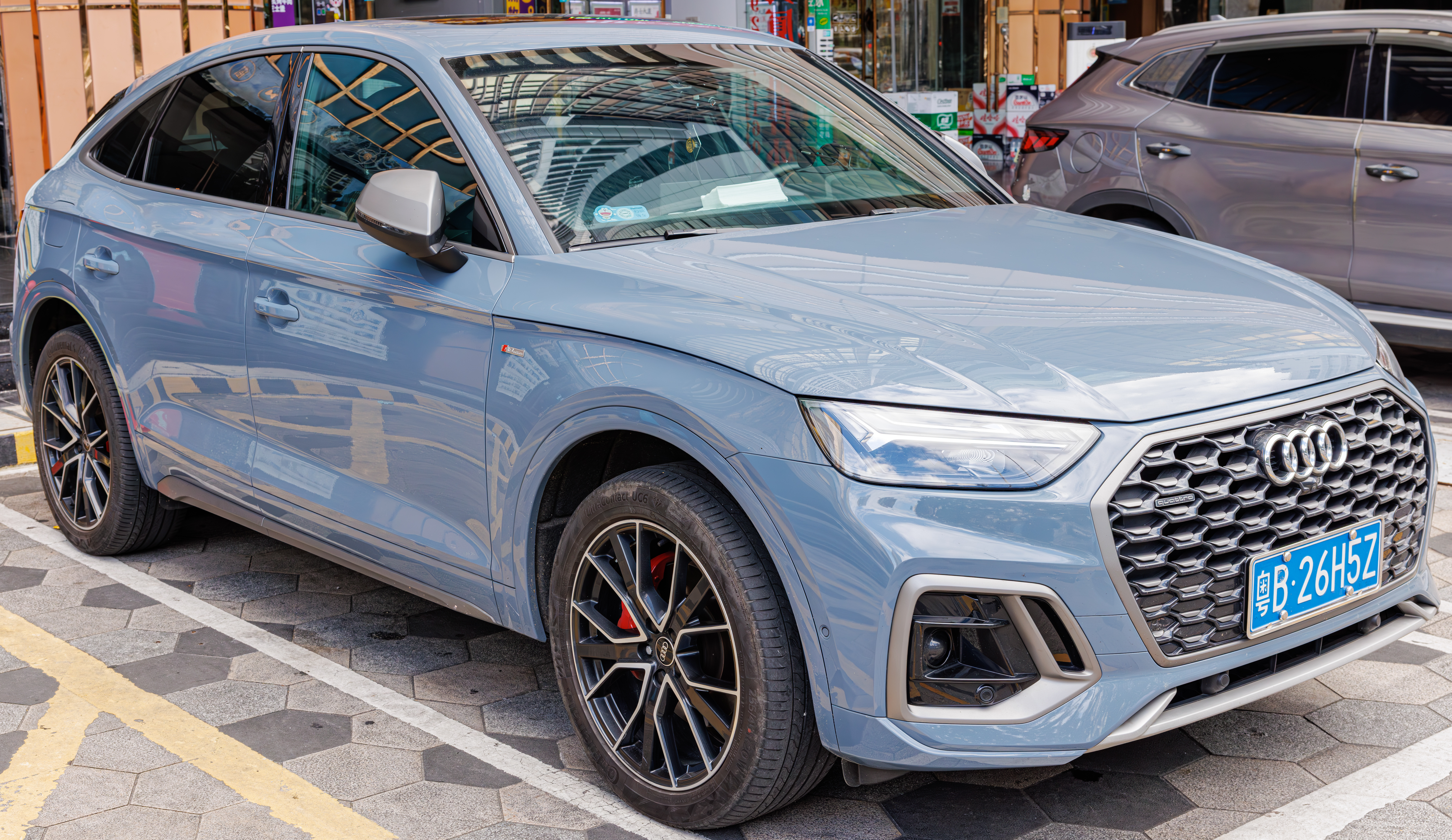
2021–2026
奥迪Q5L
Audi Q5L Sportback

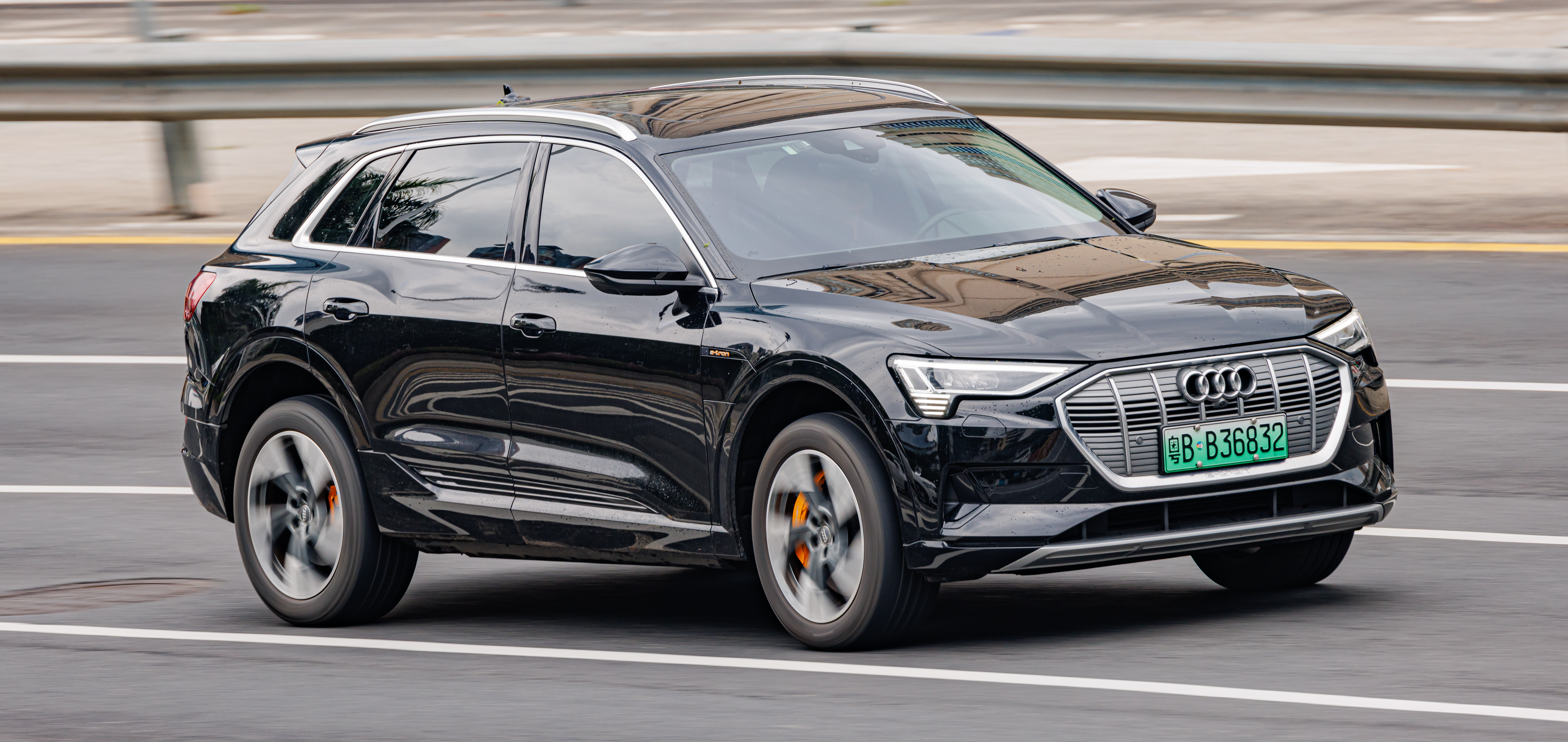
2020–2024
奥迪 e-tron
Audi e-tron

=== Volkswagen ===
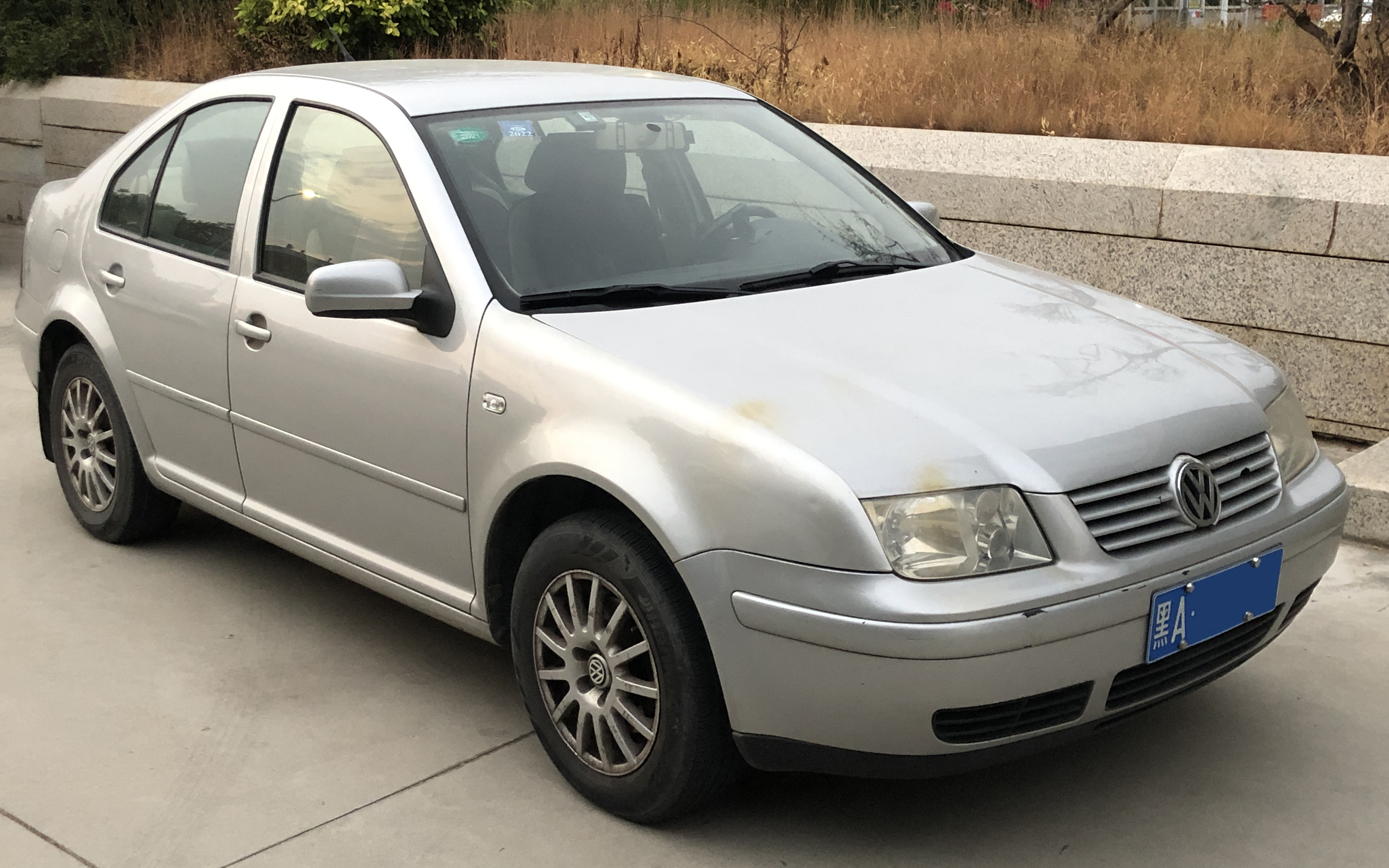
2001–2005
大众宝来
Volkswagen Bora Mk1

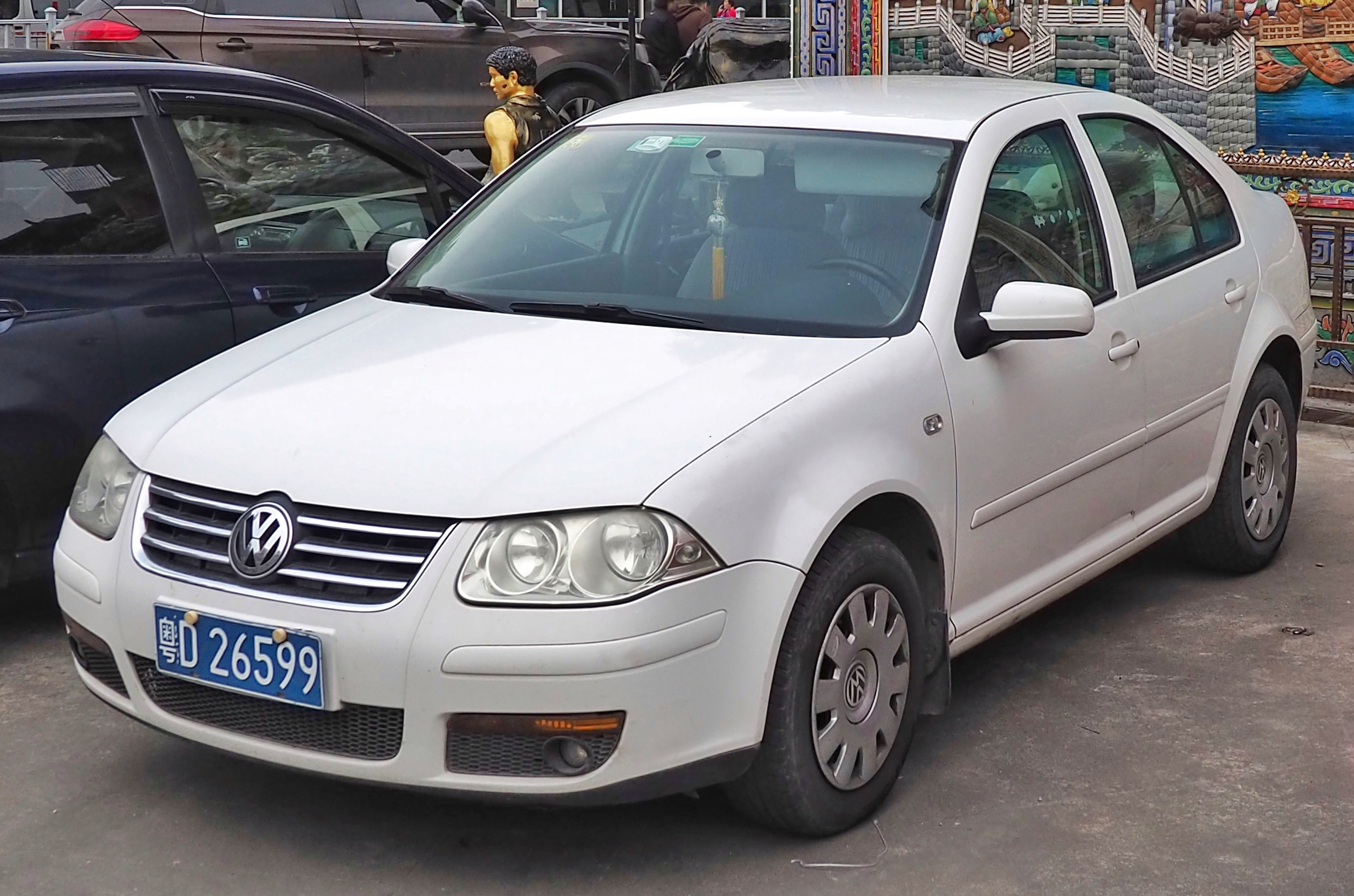
2006–2008
大众宝来
Volkswagen Bora Mk1

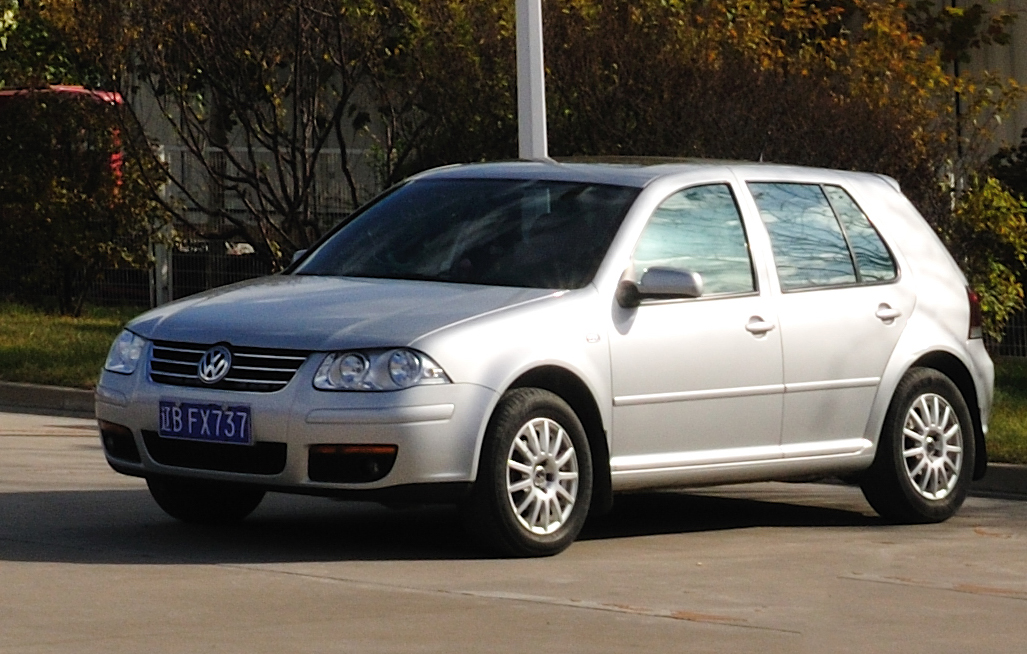
2006–2008
大众宝来HS
Volkswagen Bora HS

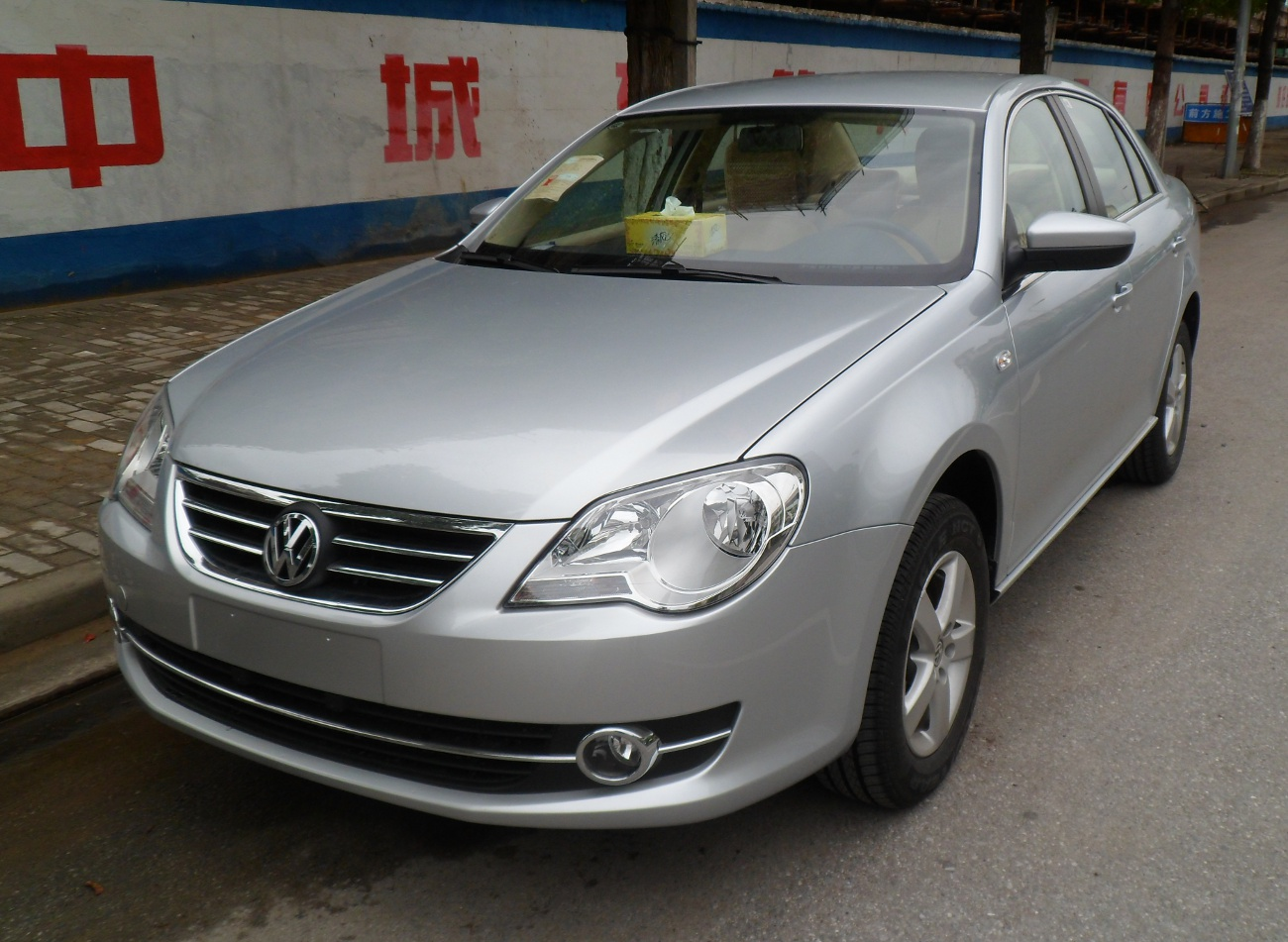
2007–2012
大众宝来
Volkswagen Bora Mk2

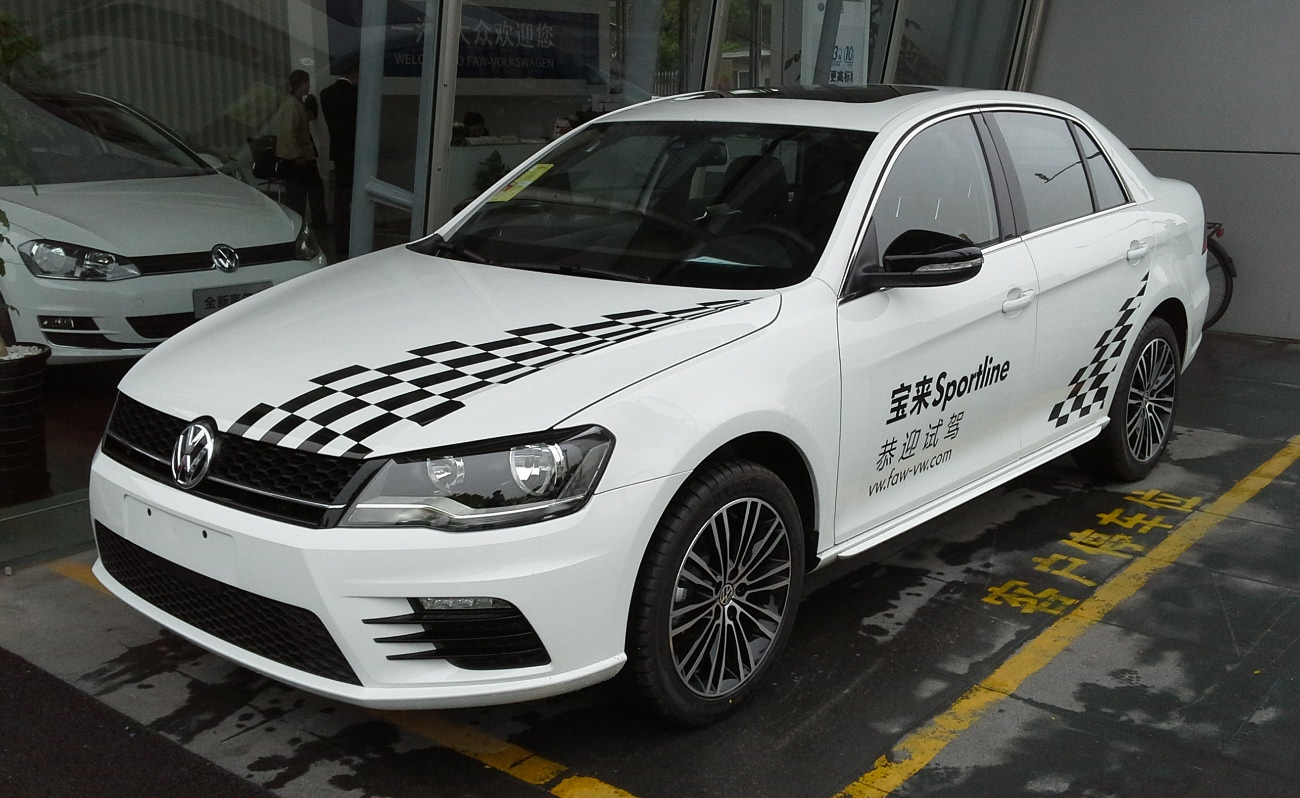
2012–2015
大众宝来
Volkswagen Bora Mk2

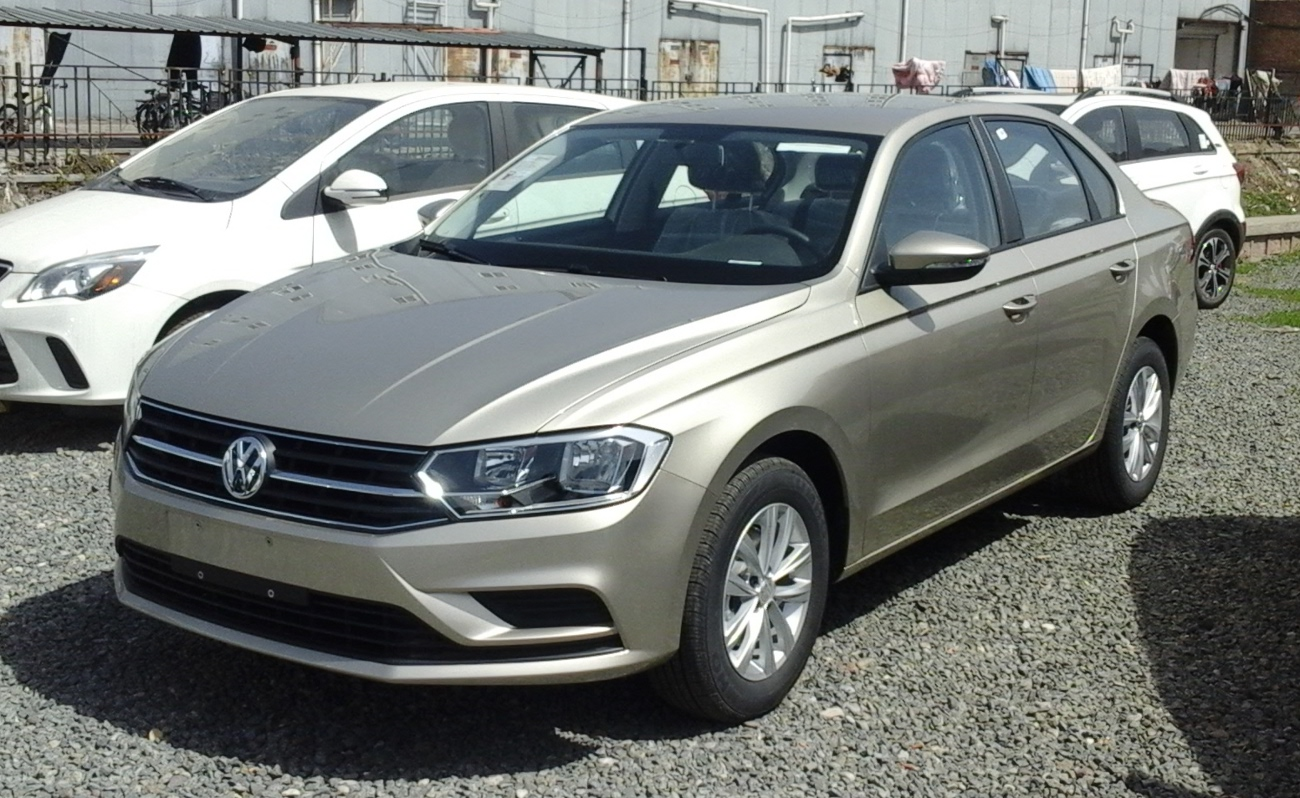
2016–2022
大众宝来
Volkswagen Bora Mk3

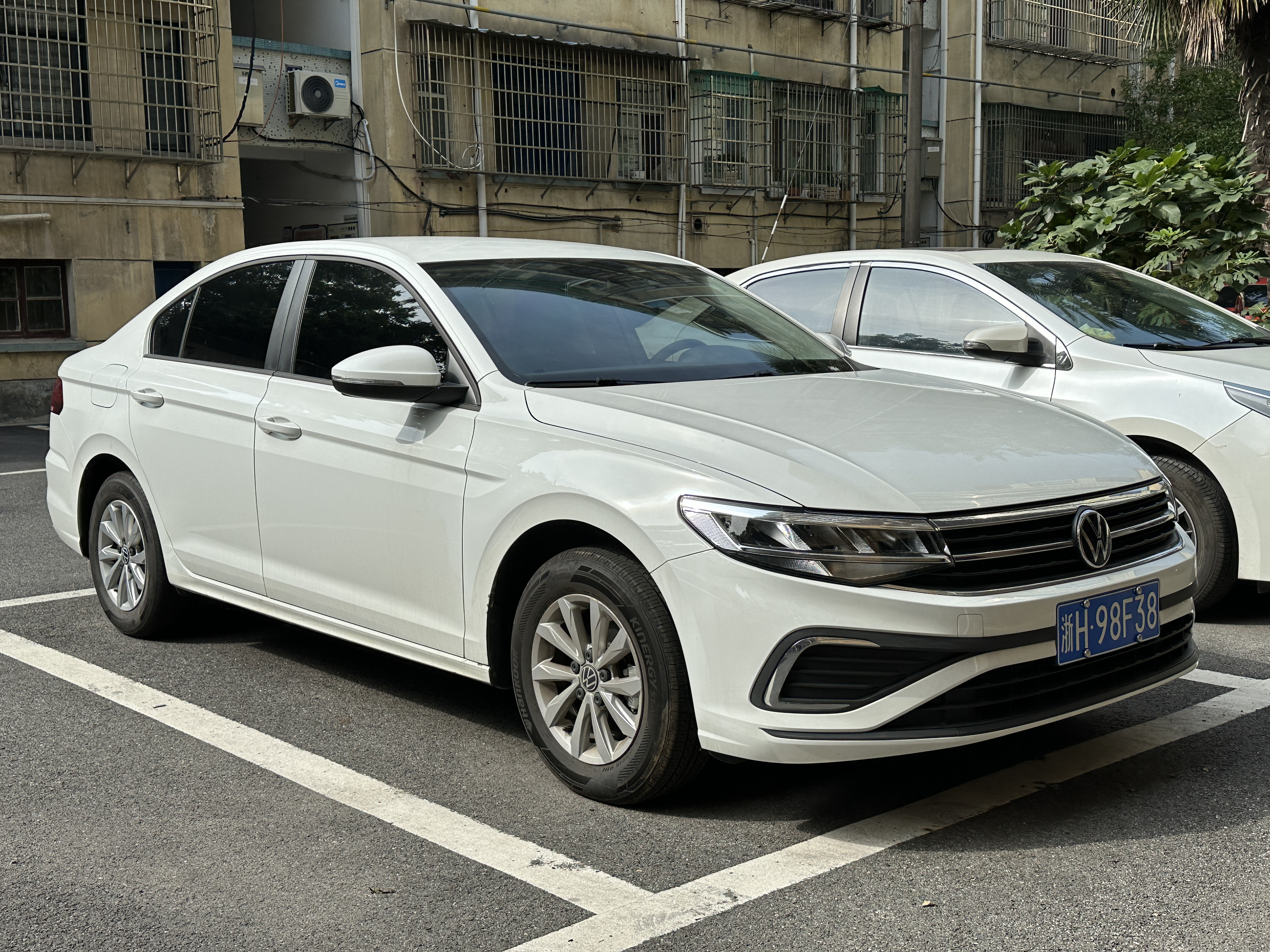
2018–2026
大众宝来
Volkswagen Bora Mk4

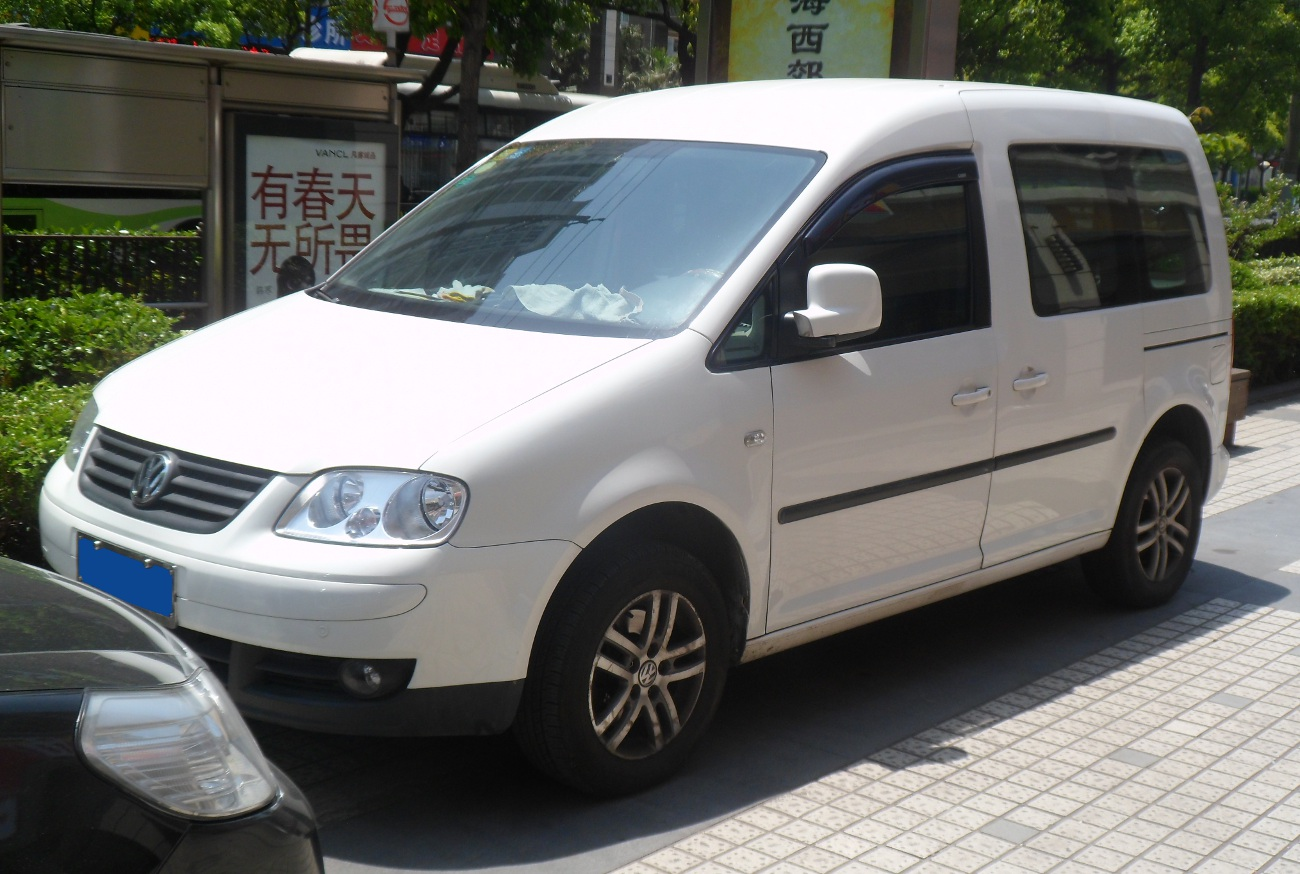
2005–2007
大众开迪
Volkswagen Caddy

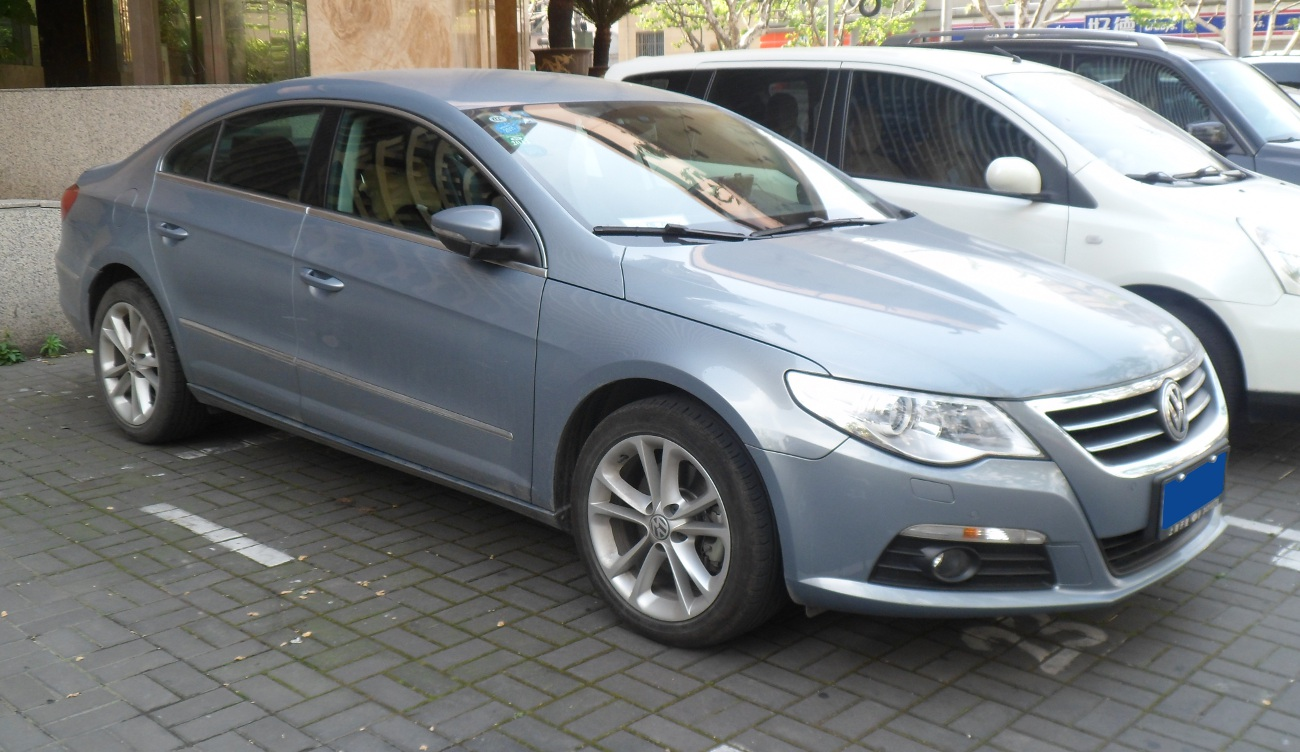
2010–2012
大众CC
Volkswagen CC

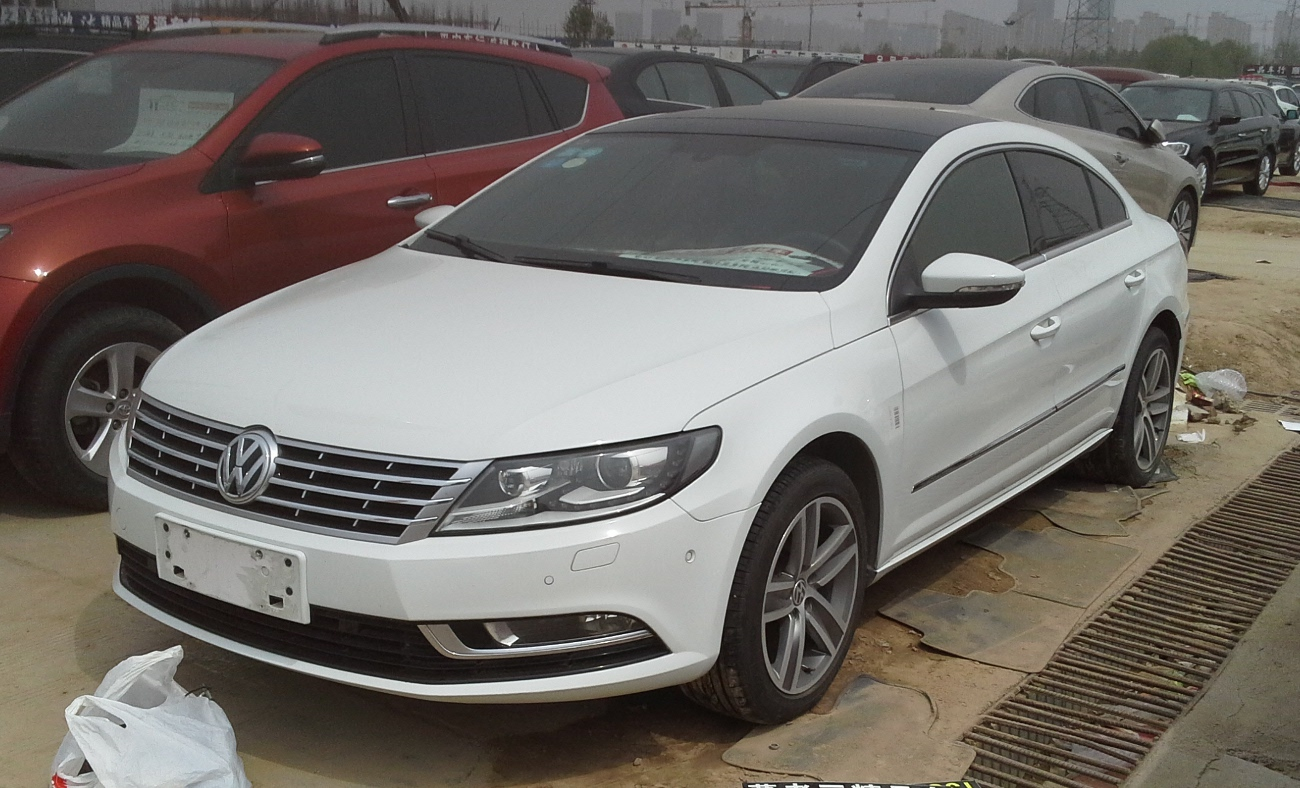
2012–2018
大众CC
Volkswagen CC

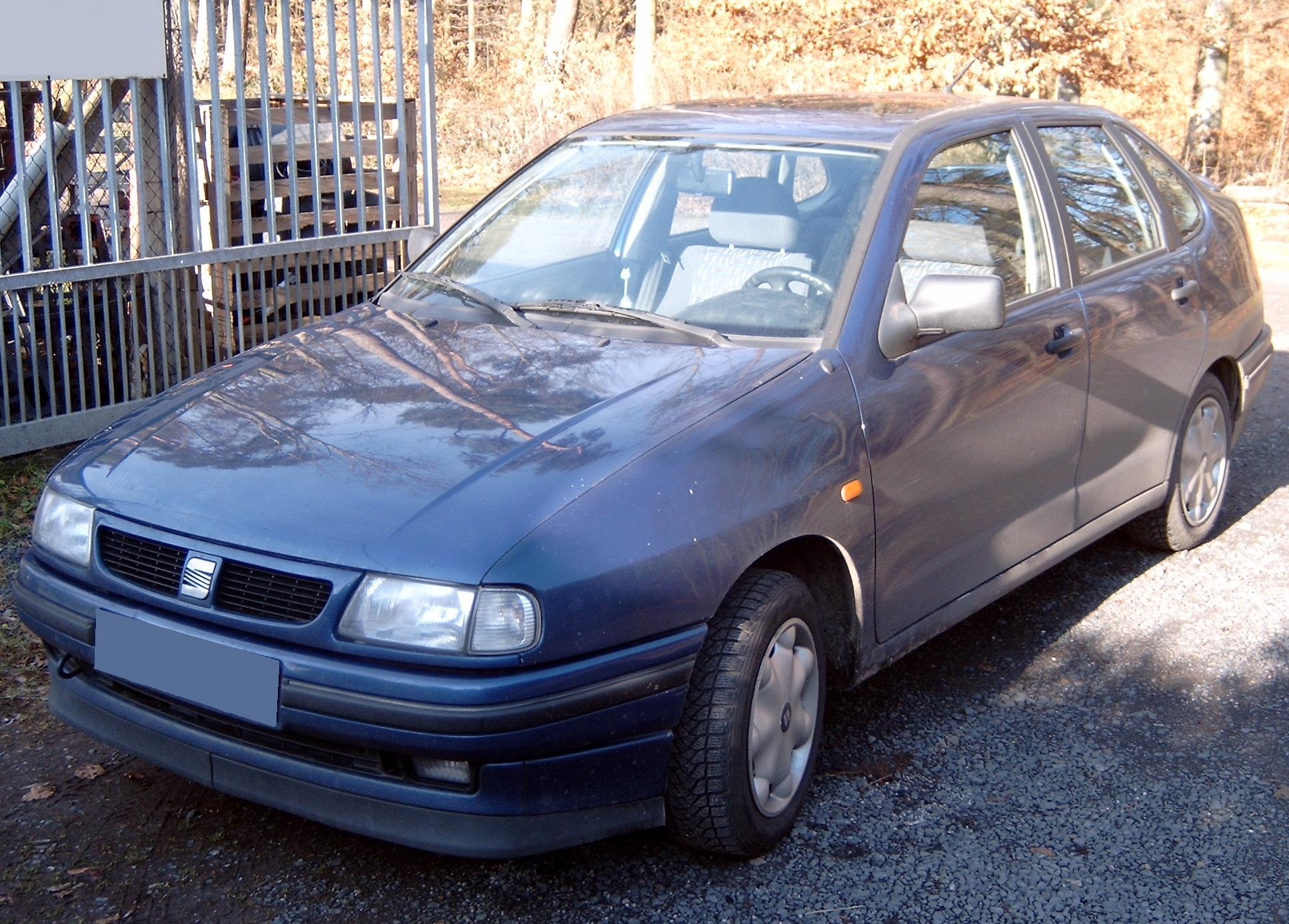
1995–2001
大众City Golf
Volkswagen City Golf (rebadged SEAT Cordoba 6K)

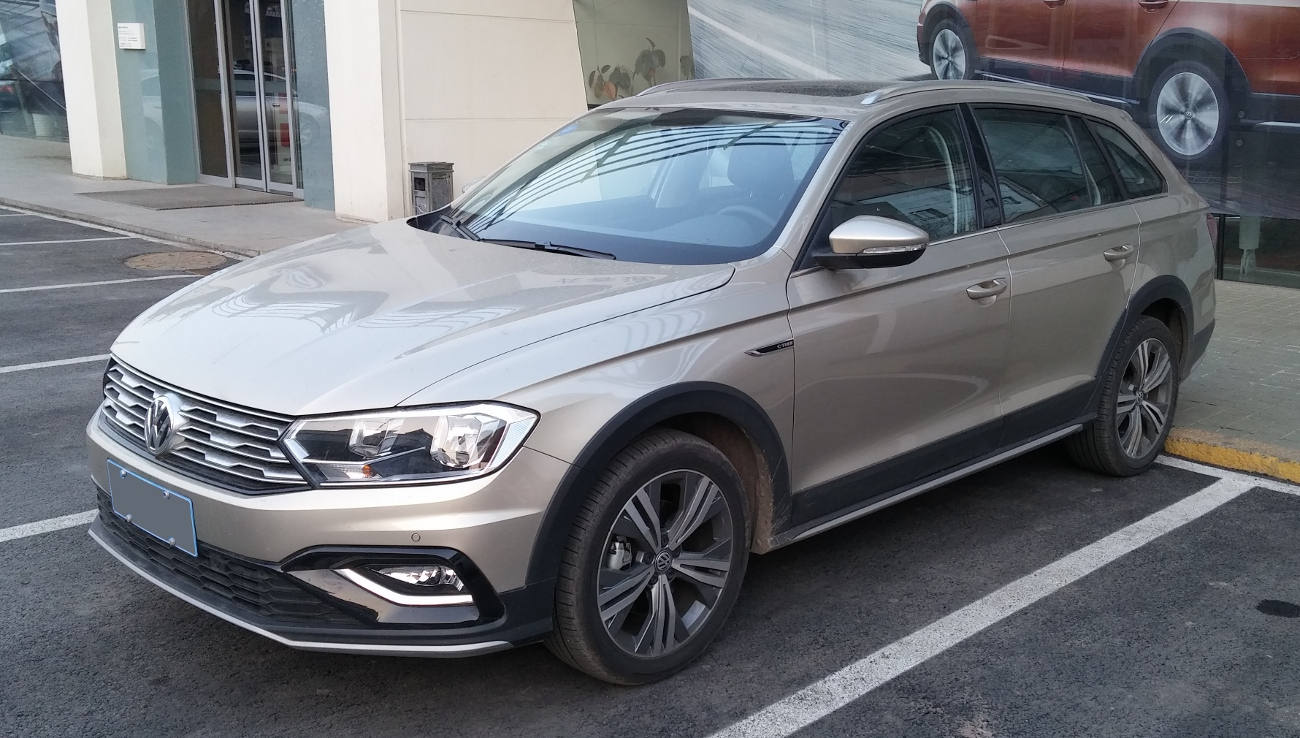
2016–2022
大众C-Trek
Volkswagen C-Trek

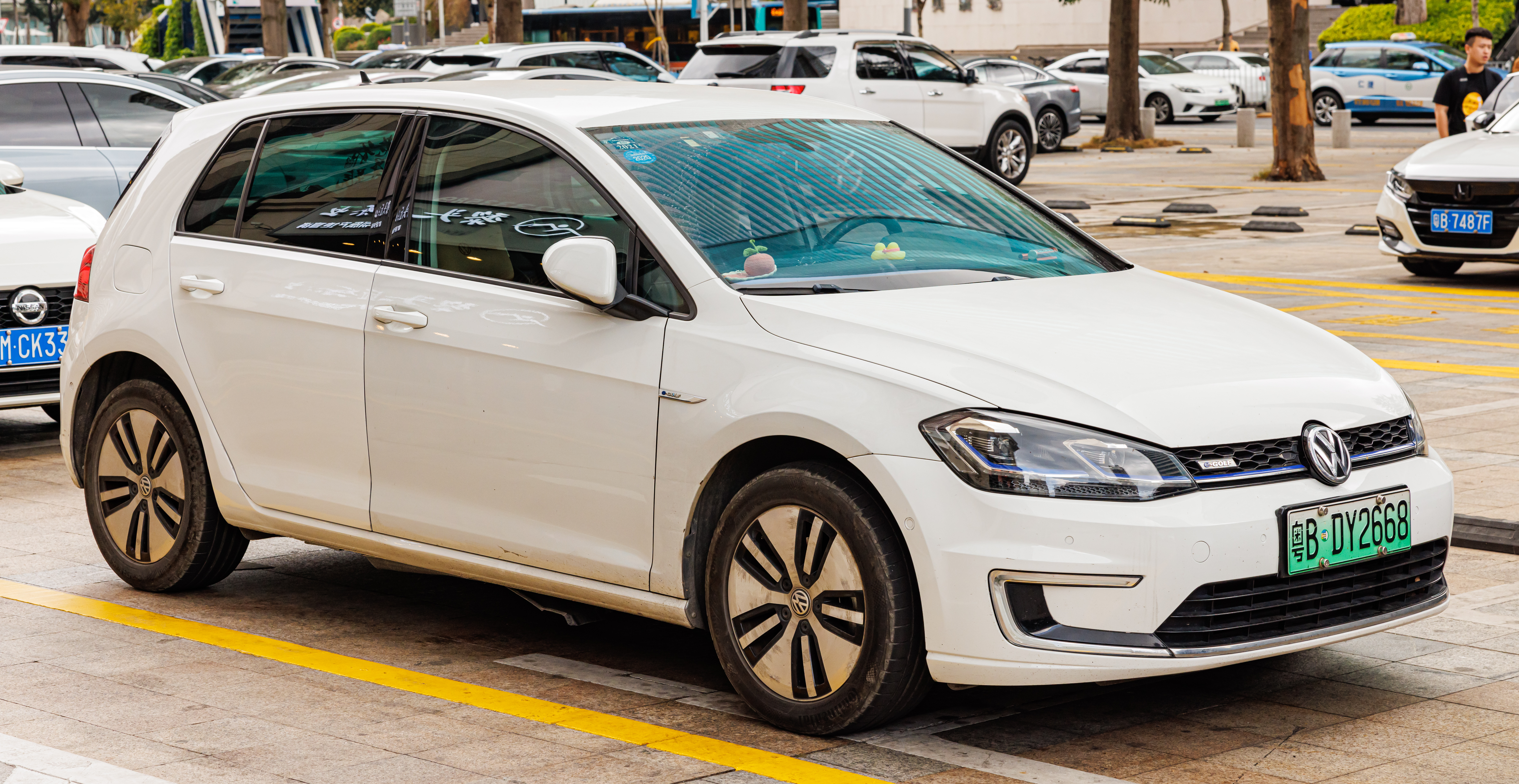
2019–2021
大众高尔夫纯电
Volkswagen e-Golf

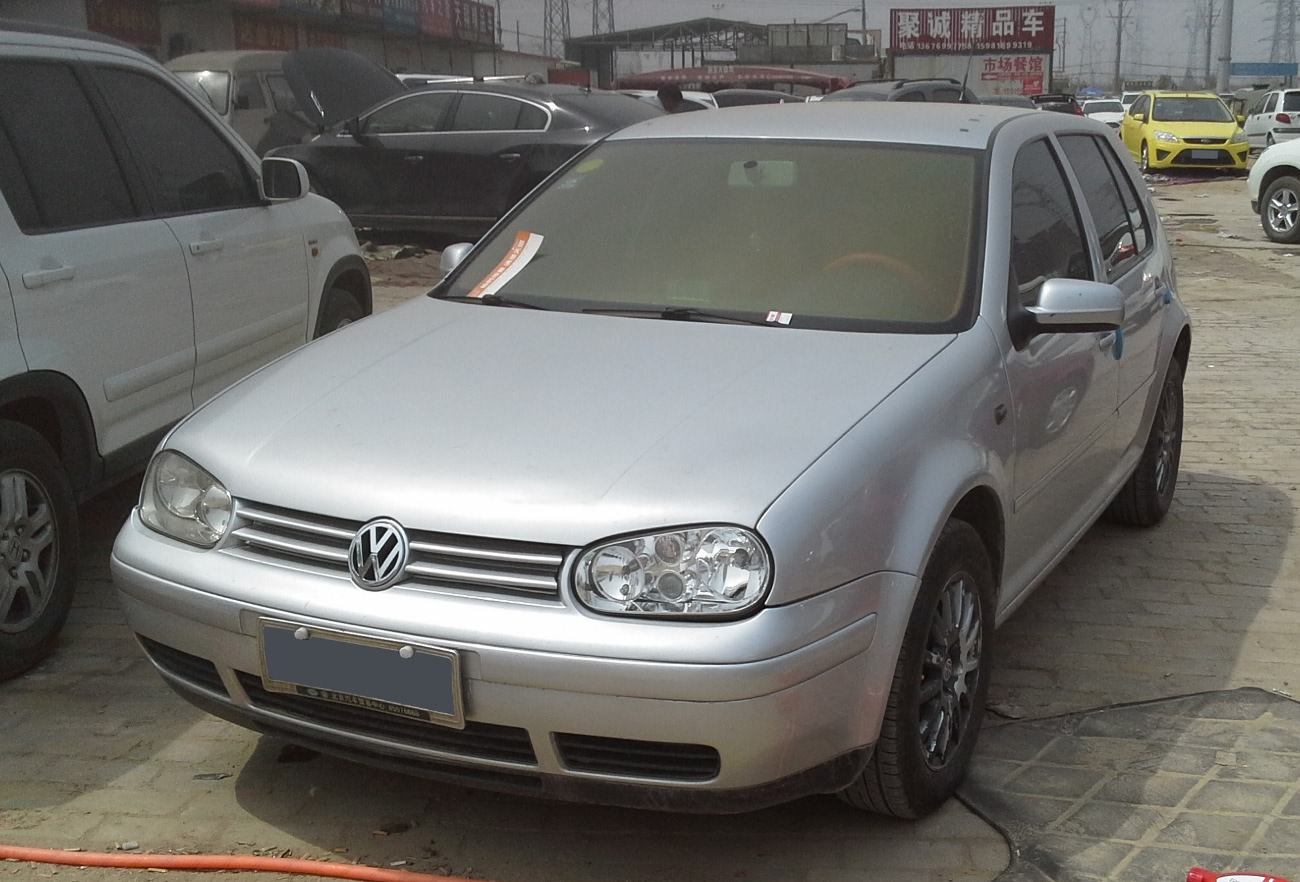
2003–2008
大众高尔夫MK4
Volkswagen Golf MK4

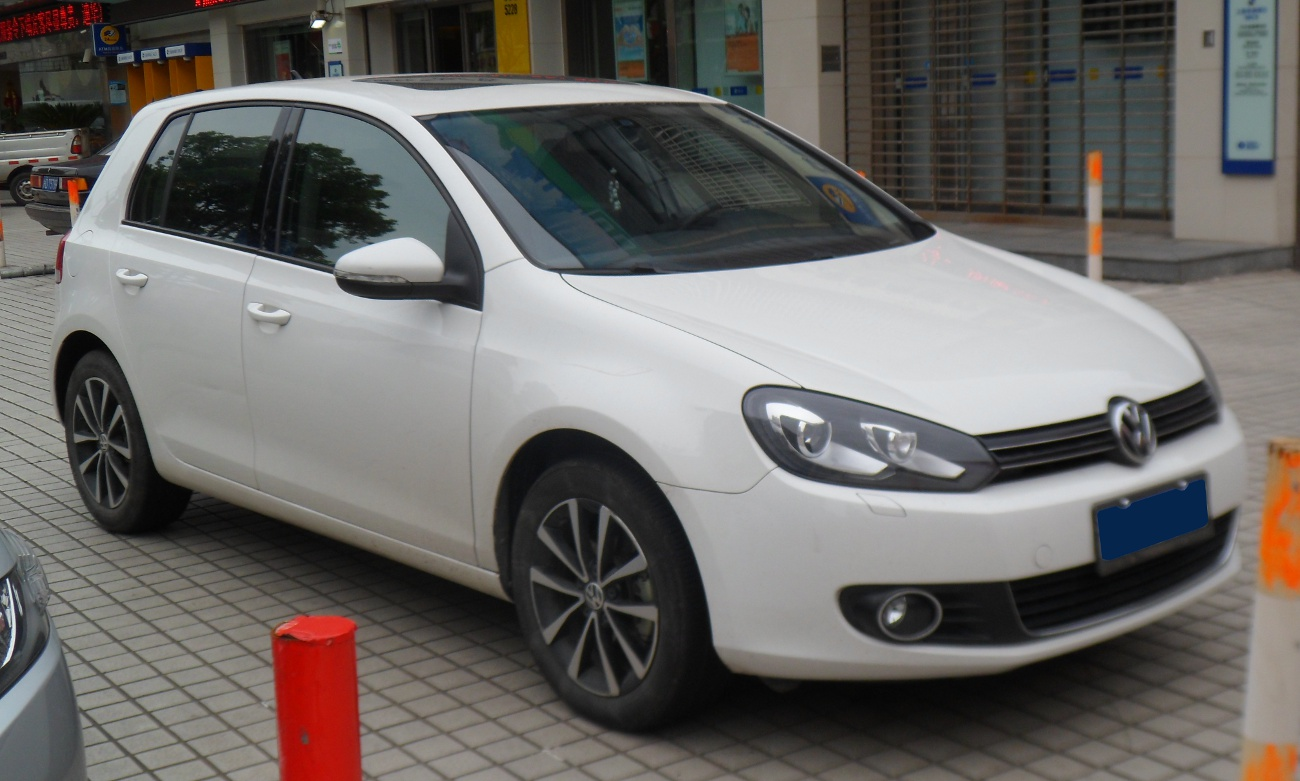
2009–2014
大众高尔夫MK6
Volkswagen Golf MK6

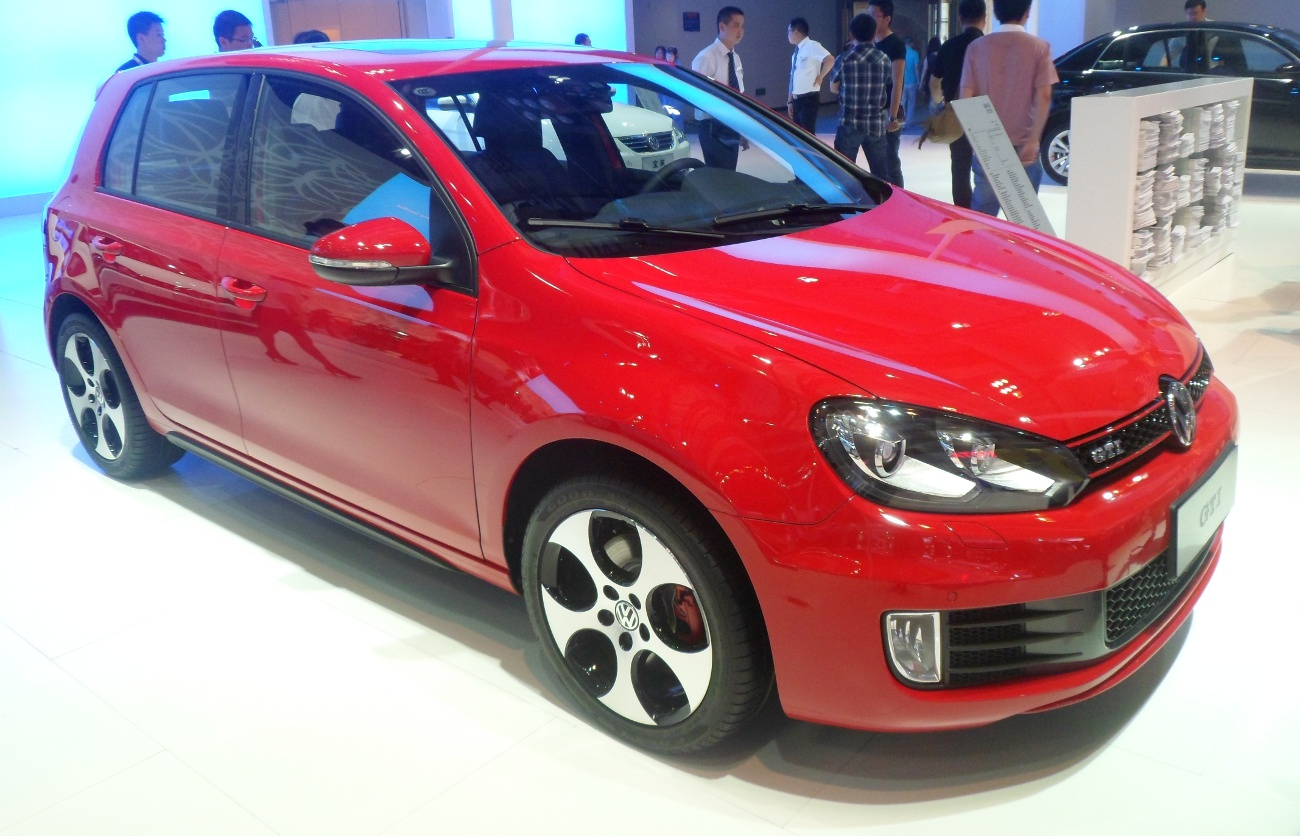
2010–2014
大众高尔夫GTI MK6
Volkswagen Golf GTI MK6

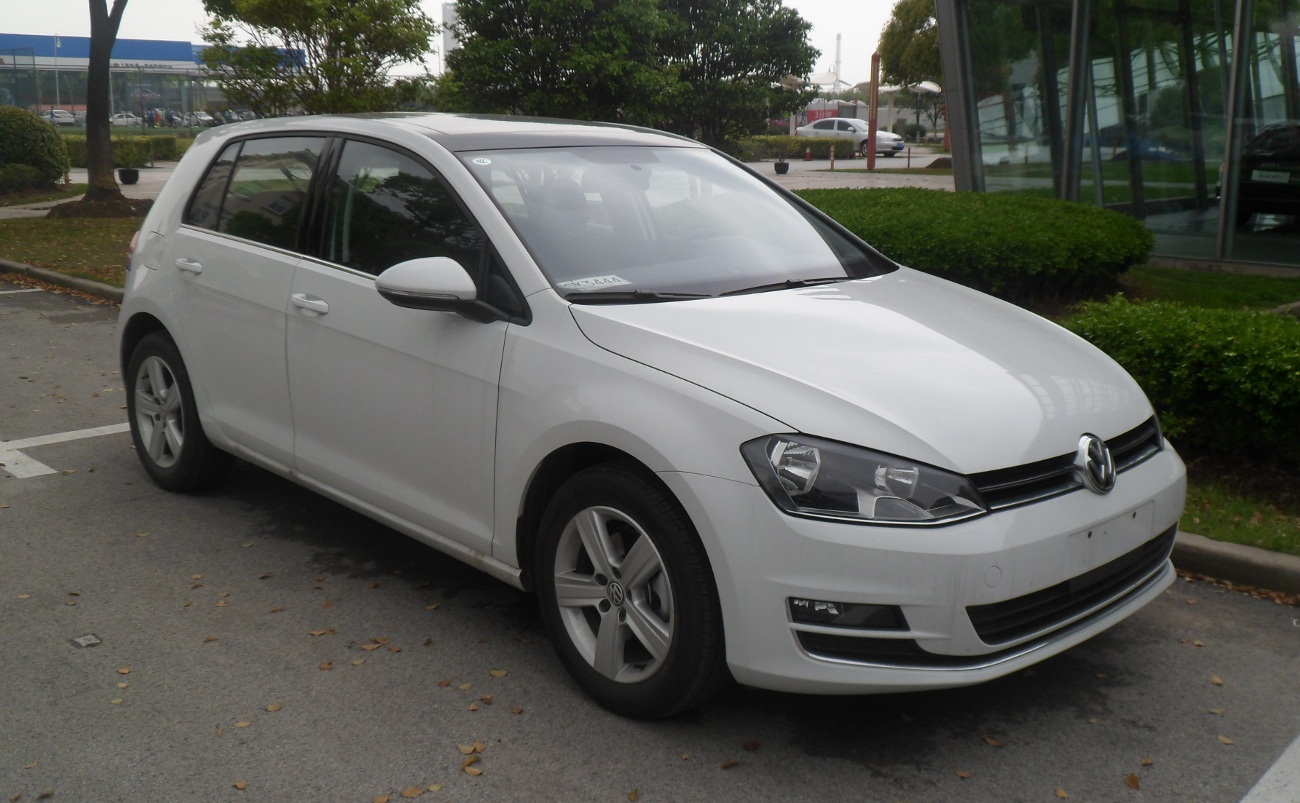
2013–2020
大众高尔夫MK7
Volkswagen Golf Mk7

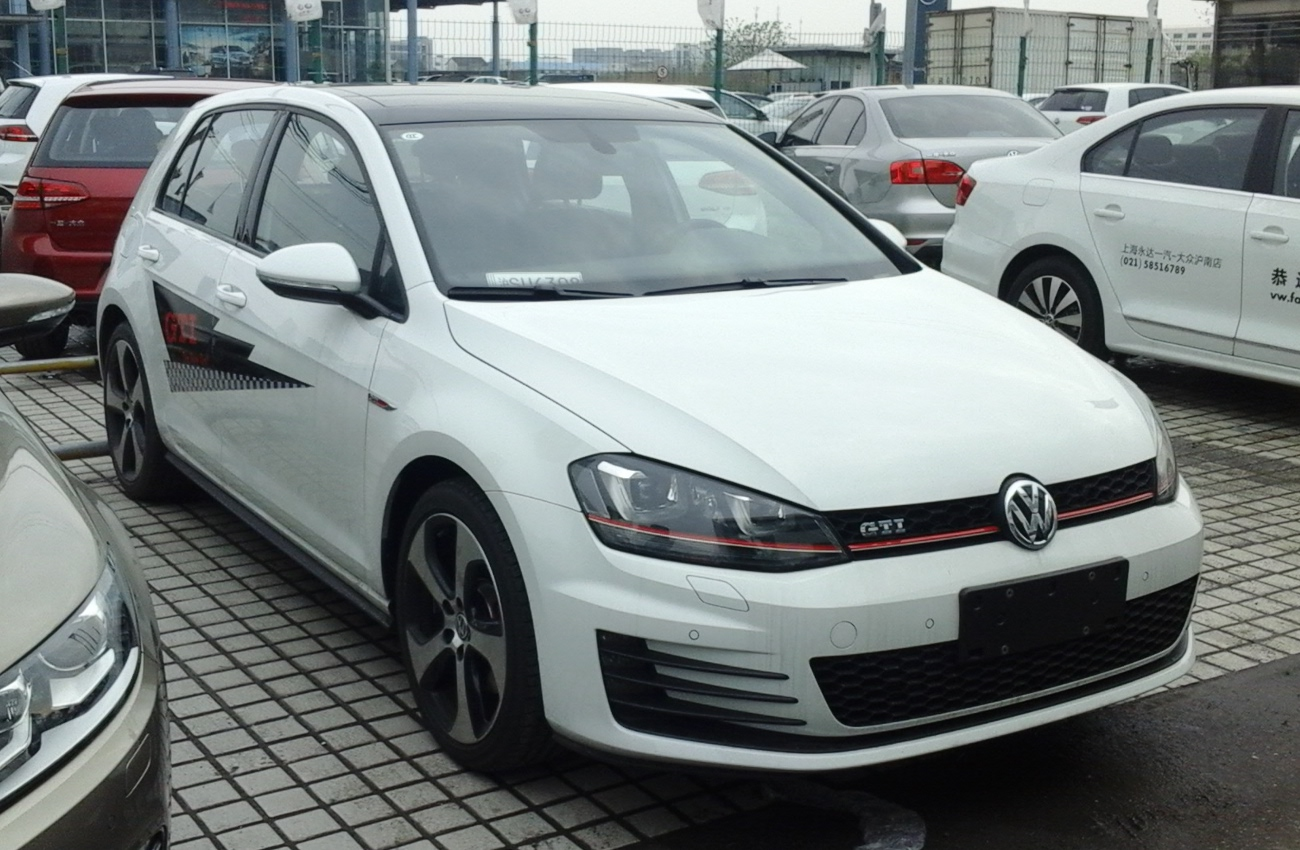
2014–2020
大众高尔夫GTI MK7
Volkswagen Golf GTI MK7

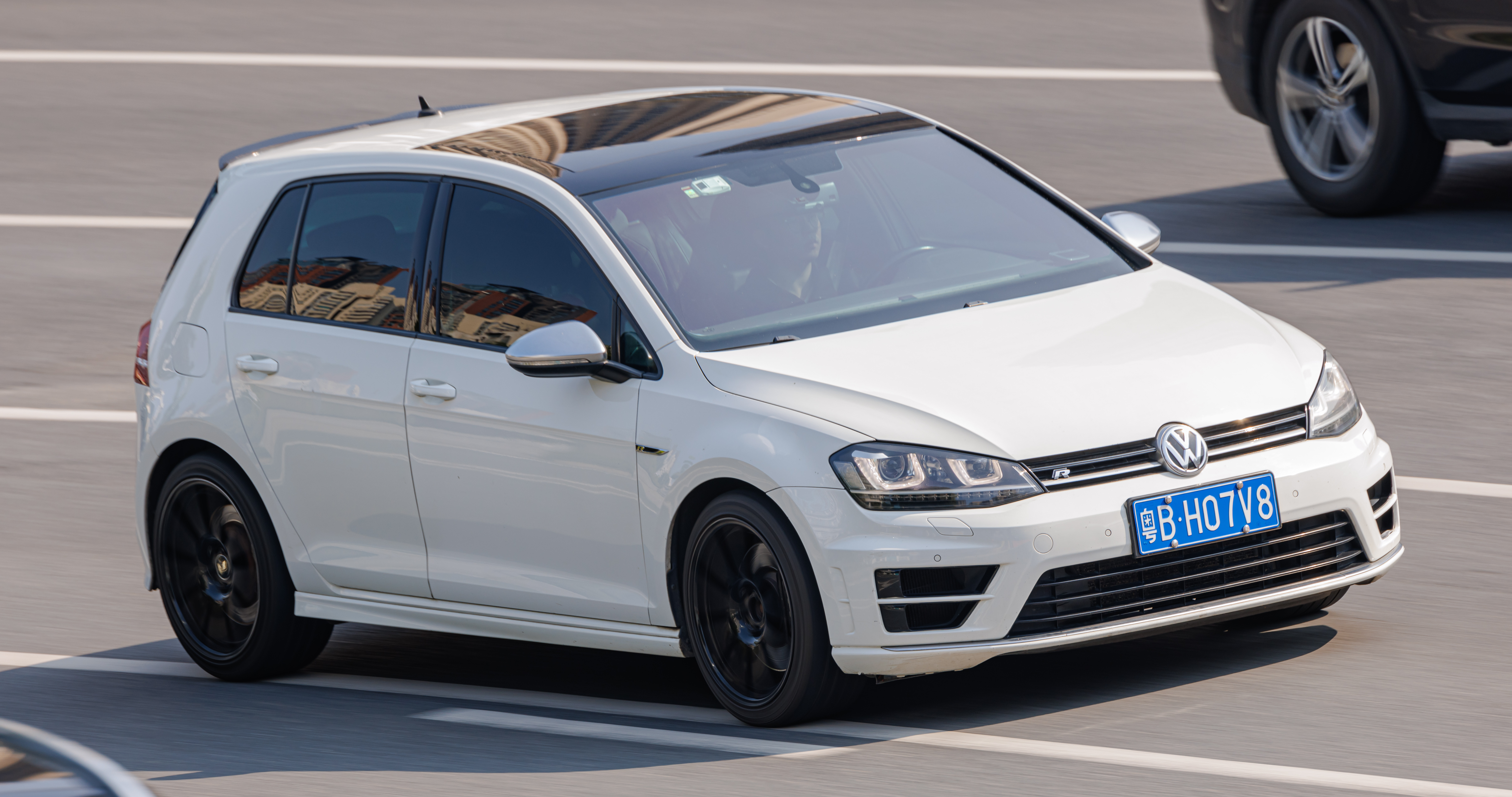
2015–2021
大众高尔夫R-Line MK7
Volkswagen Golf R-Line

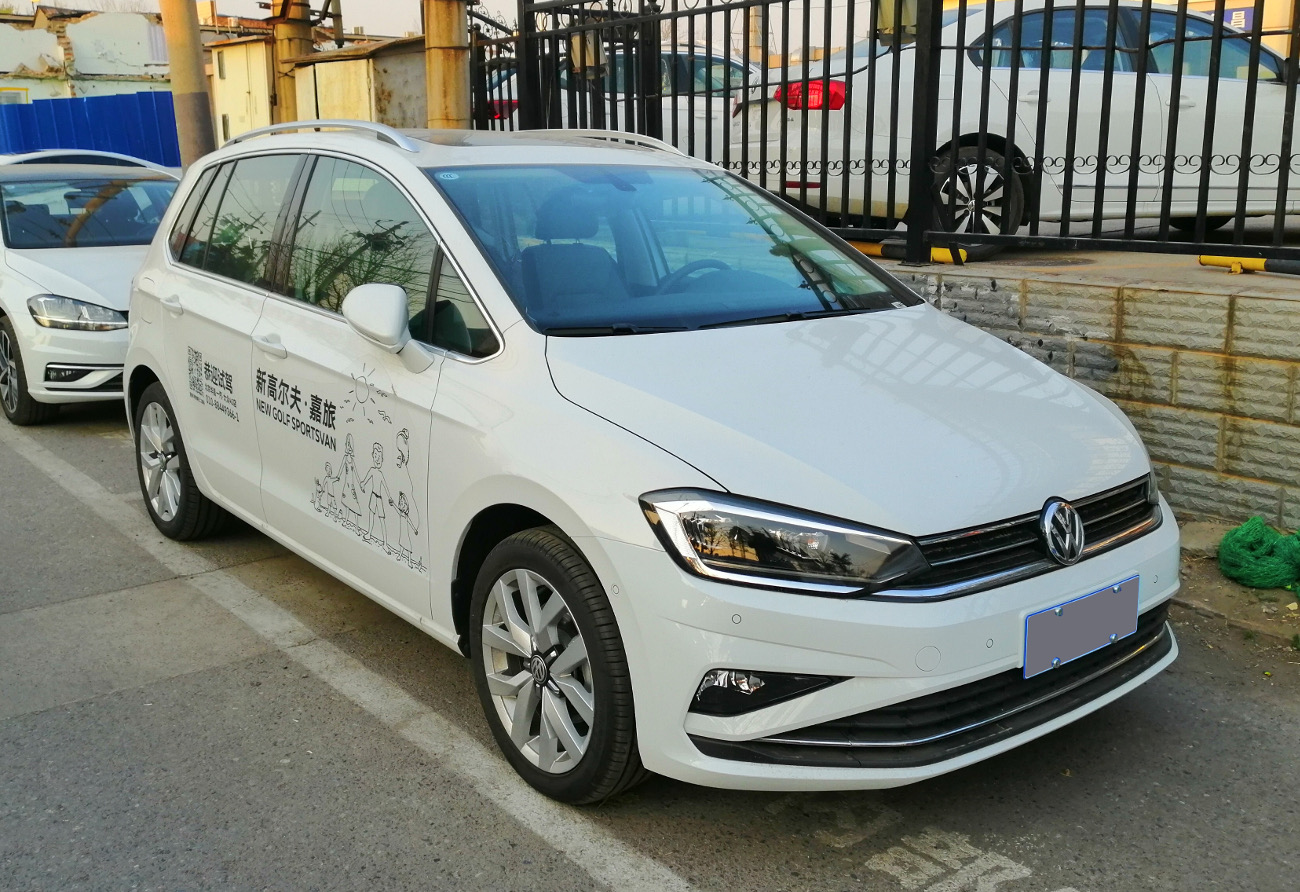
2016–2020
大众高尔夫嘉旅
Volkswagen Golf Sportsvan

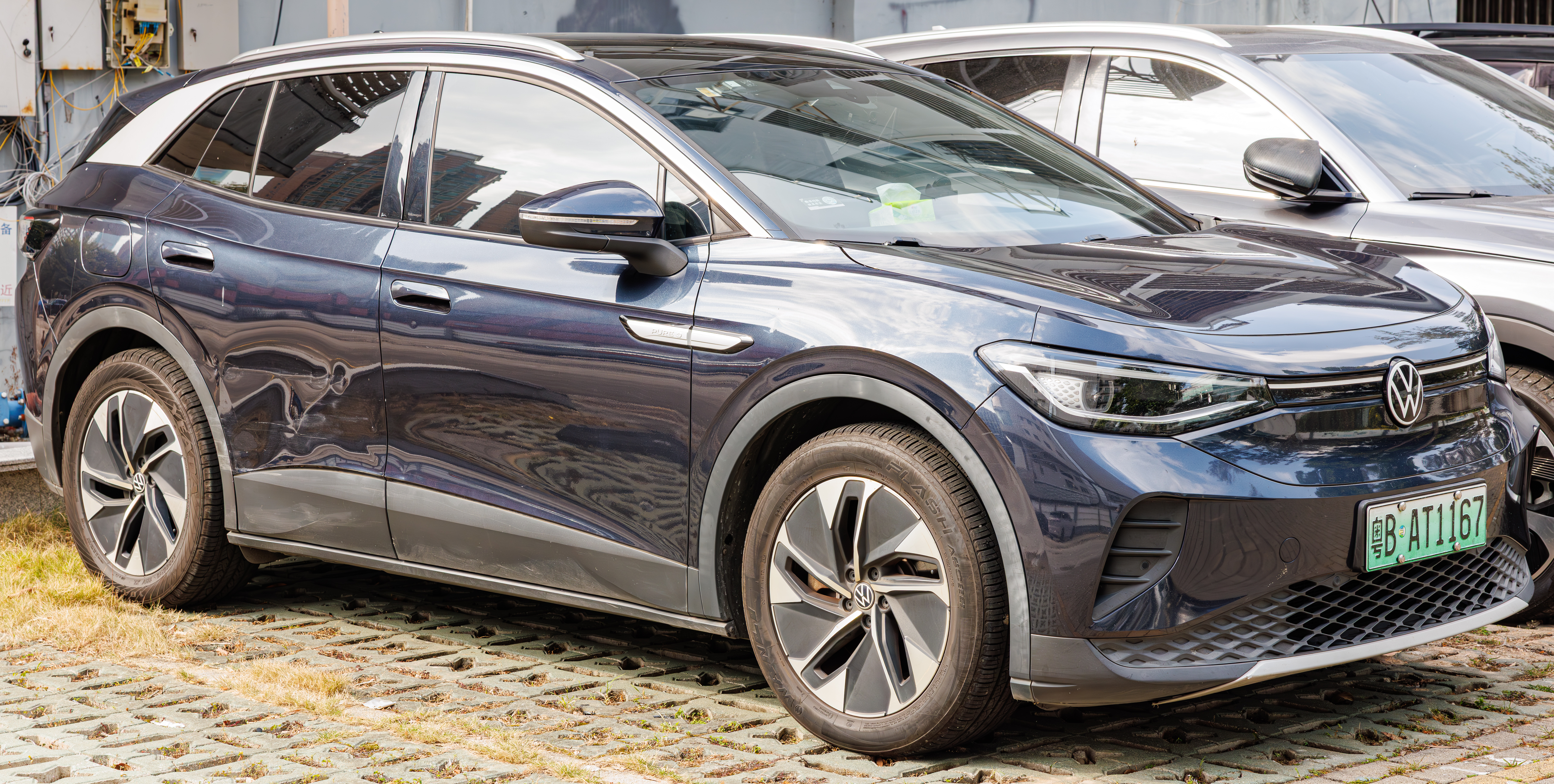
2020–2026
大众ID.4 Crozz
Volkswagen ID.4 Crozz

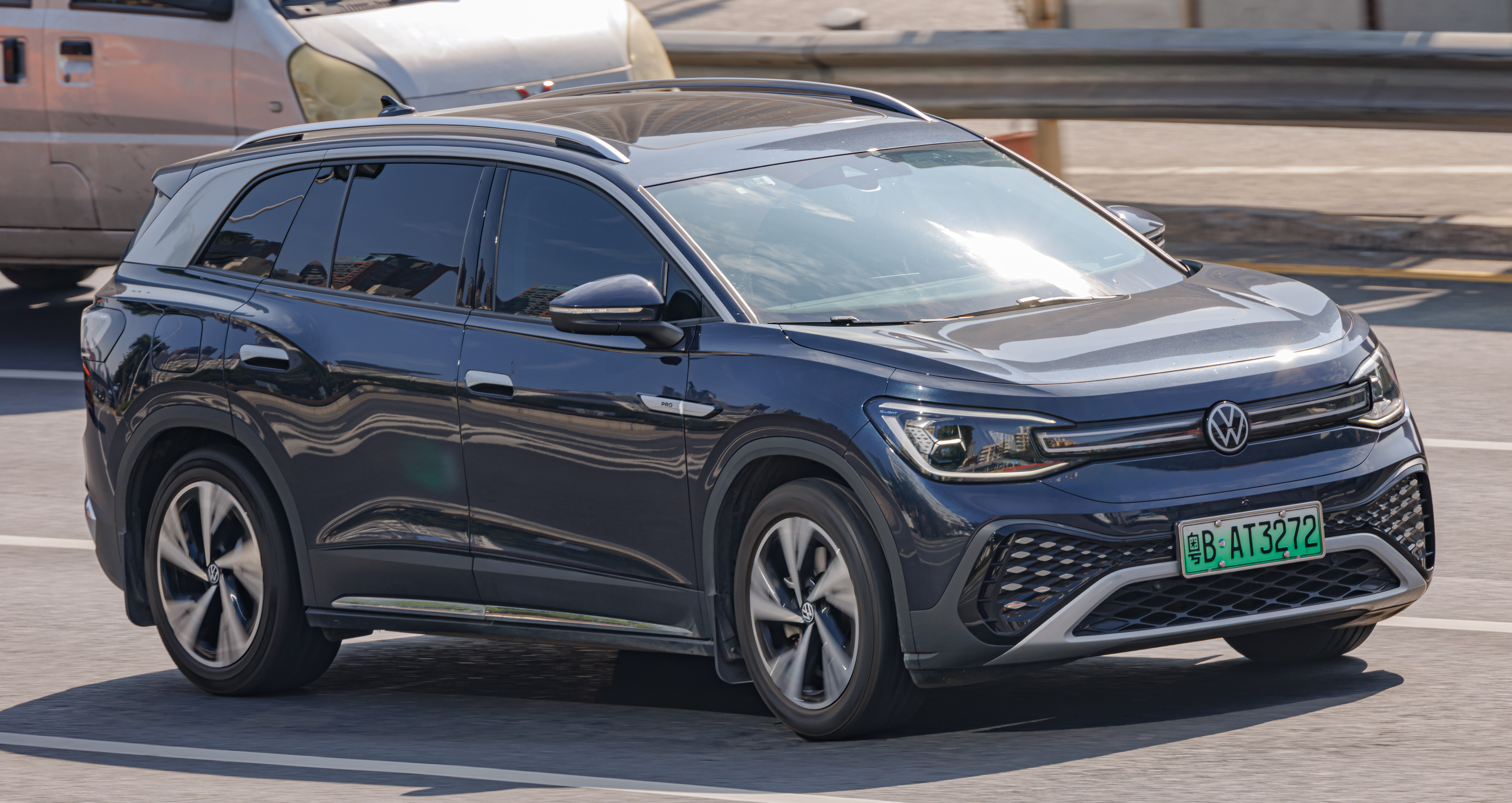
2021–2026
大众ID.6 Crozz
Volkswagen ID.6 Crozz

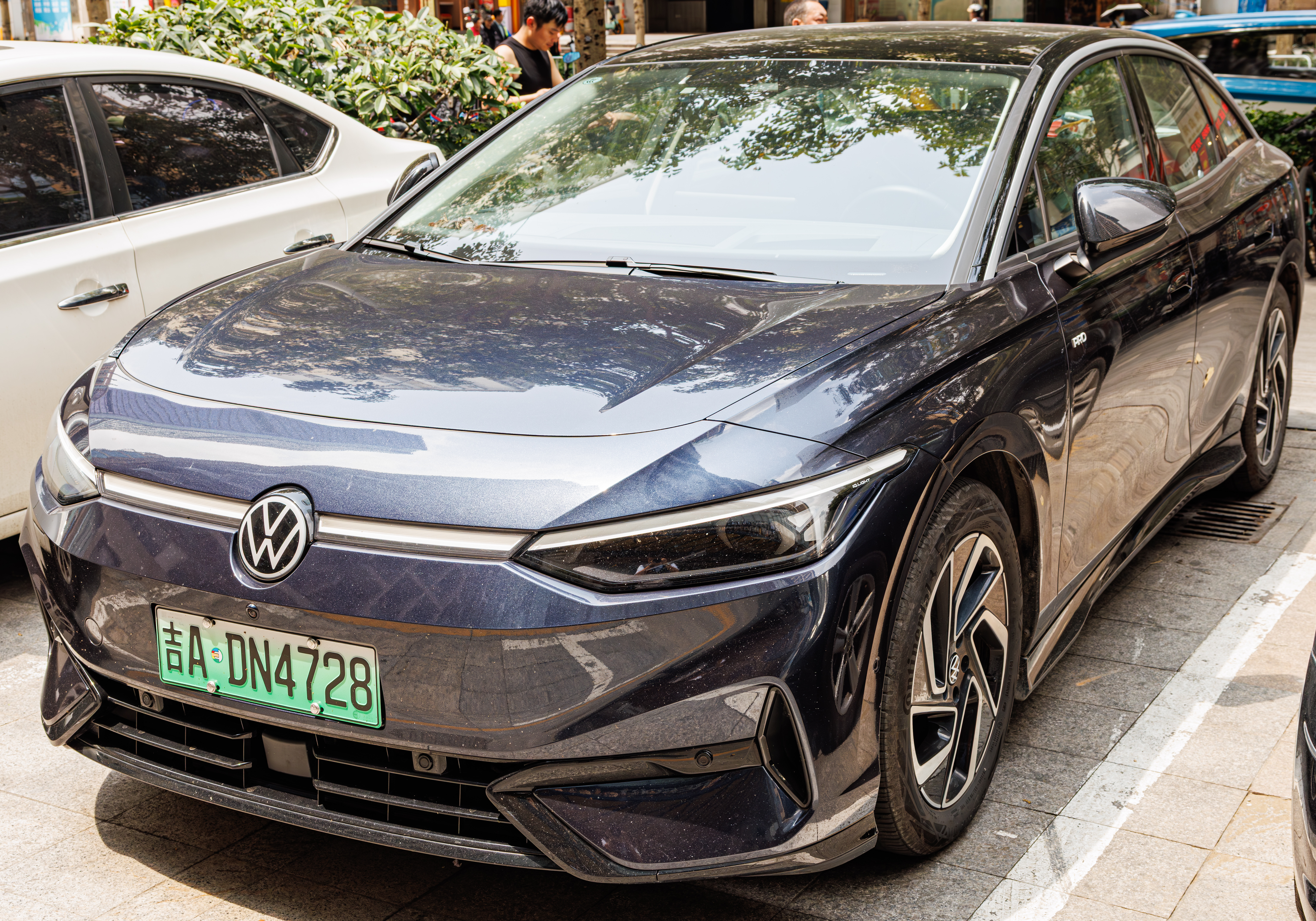
2023–2026
大众ID.7 Vizzion
Volkswagen ID.7 Vizzion

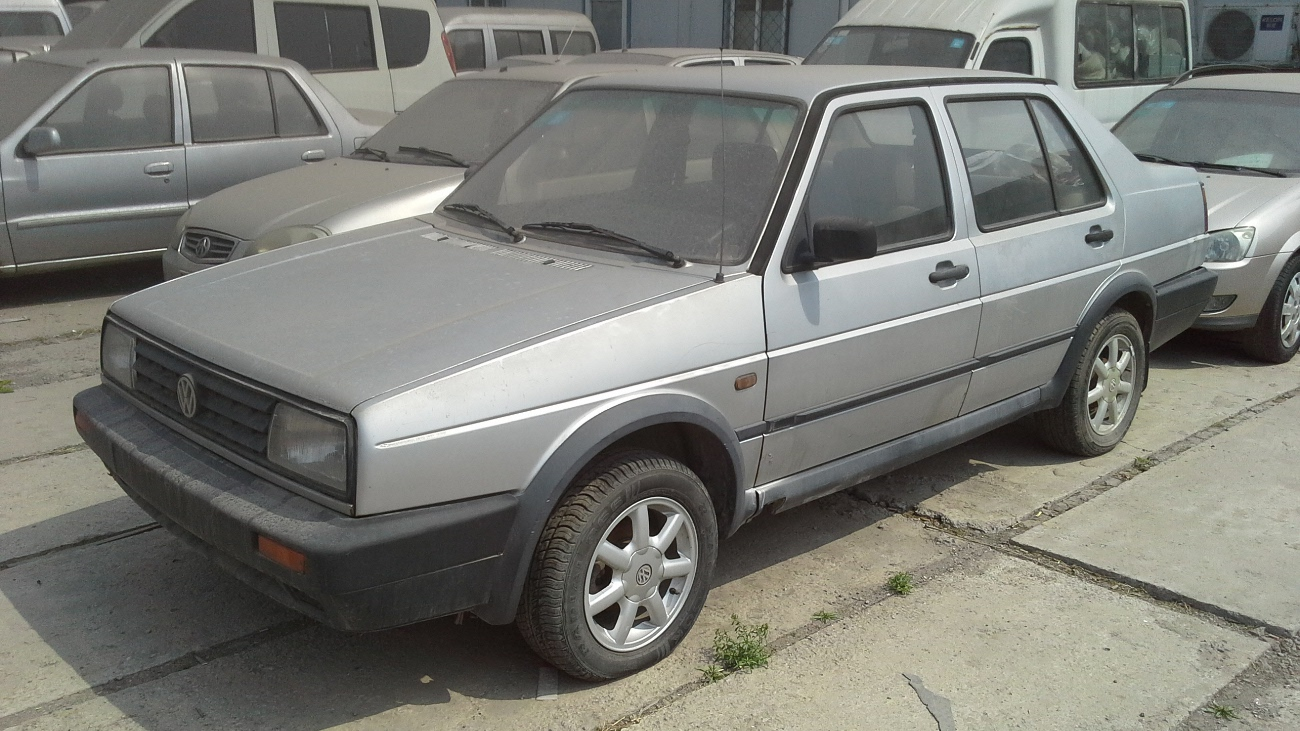
1991–1997
大众捷达A2
Volkswagen Jetta A2

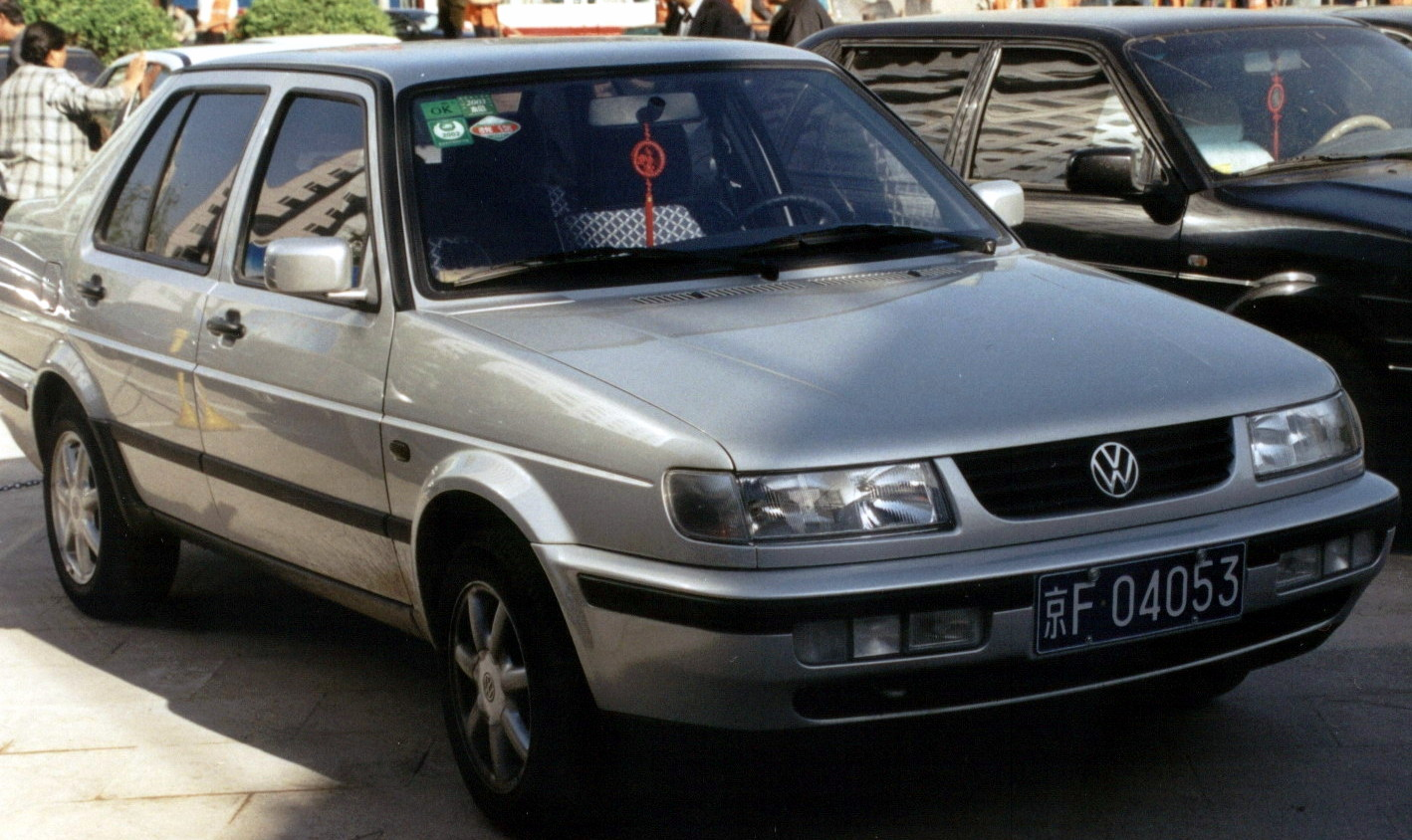
1997–2004
大众捷达王
Volkswagen Jetta King

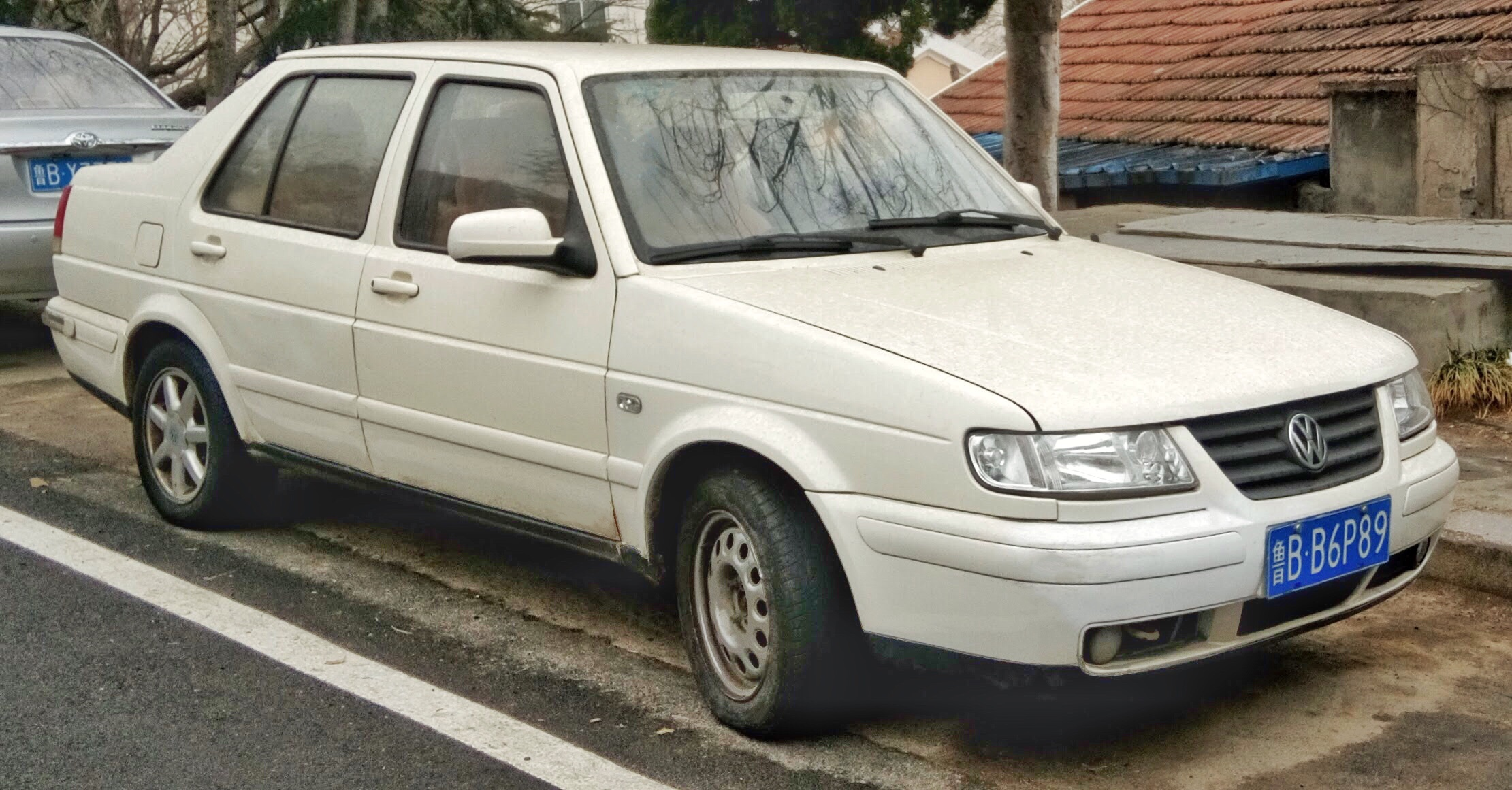
2002–2010
大众捷达王
Volkswagen Jetta King

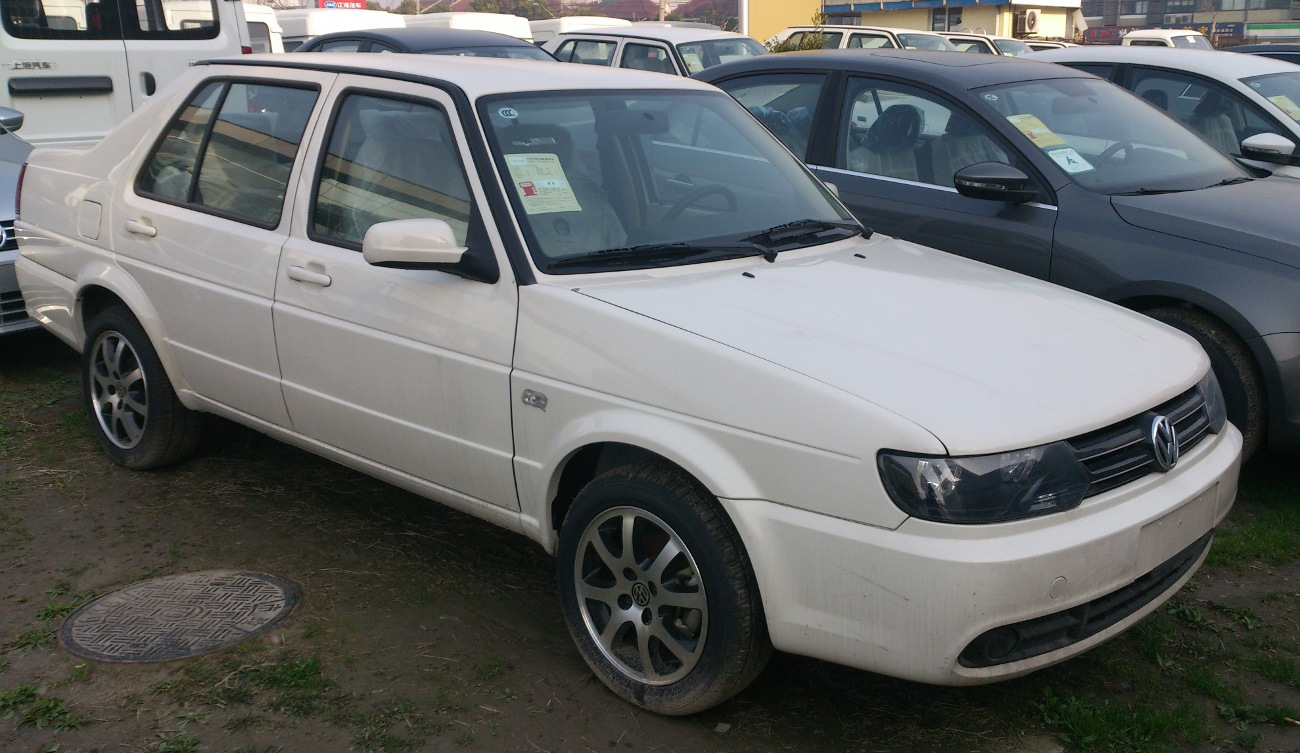
2010–2013
大众捷达先锋
Volkswagen Jetta Pioneer

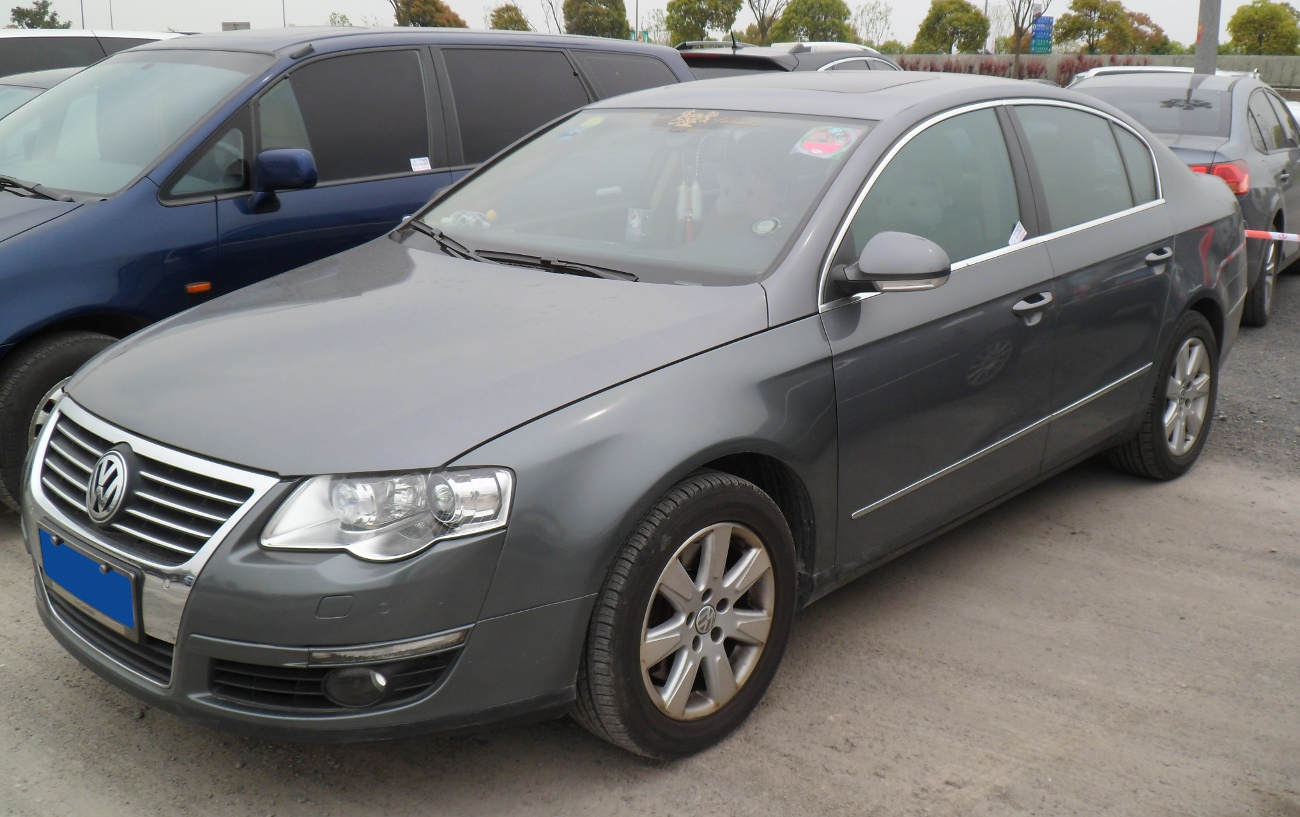
2007–2011
大众迈腾B6
Volkswagen Magotan B6

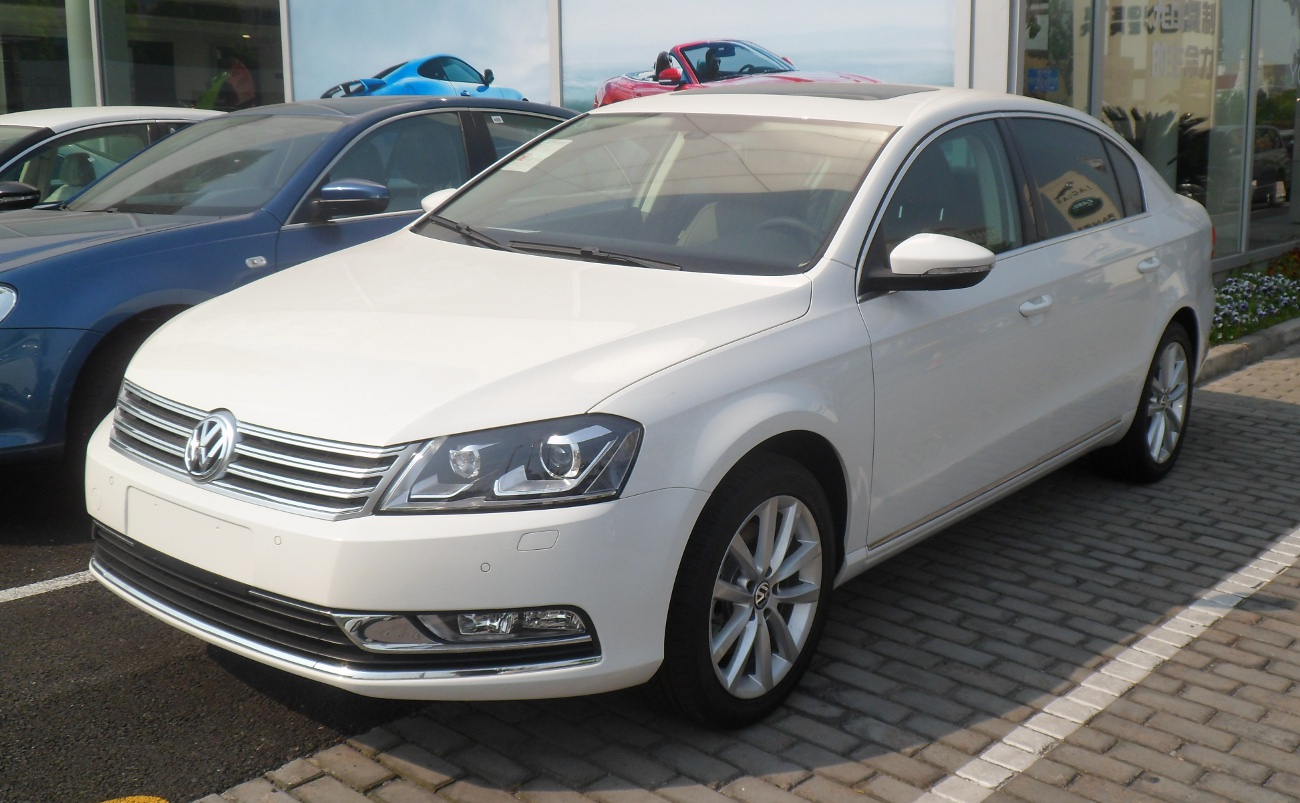
2011–2016
大众迈腾B7
Volkswagen Magotan B7

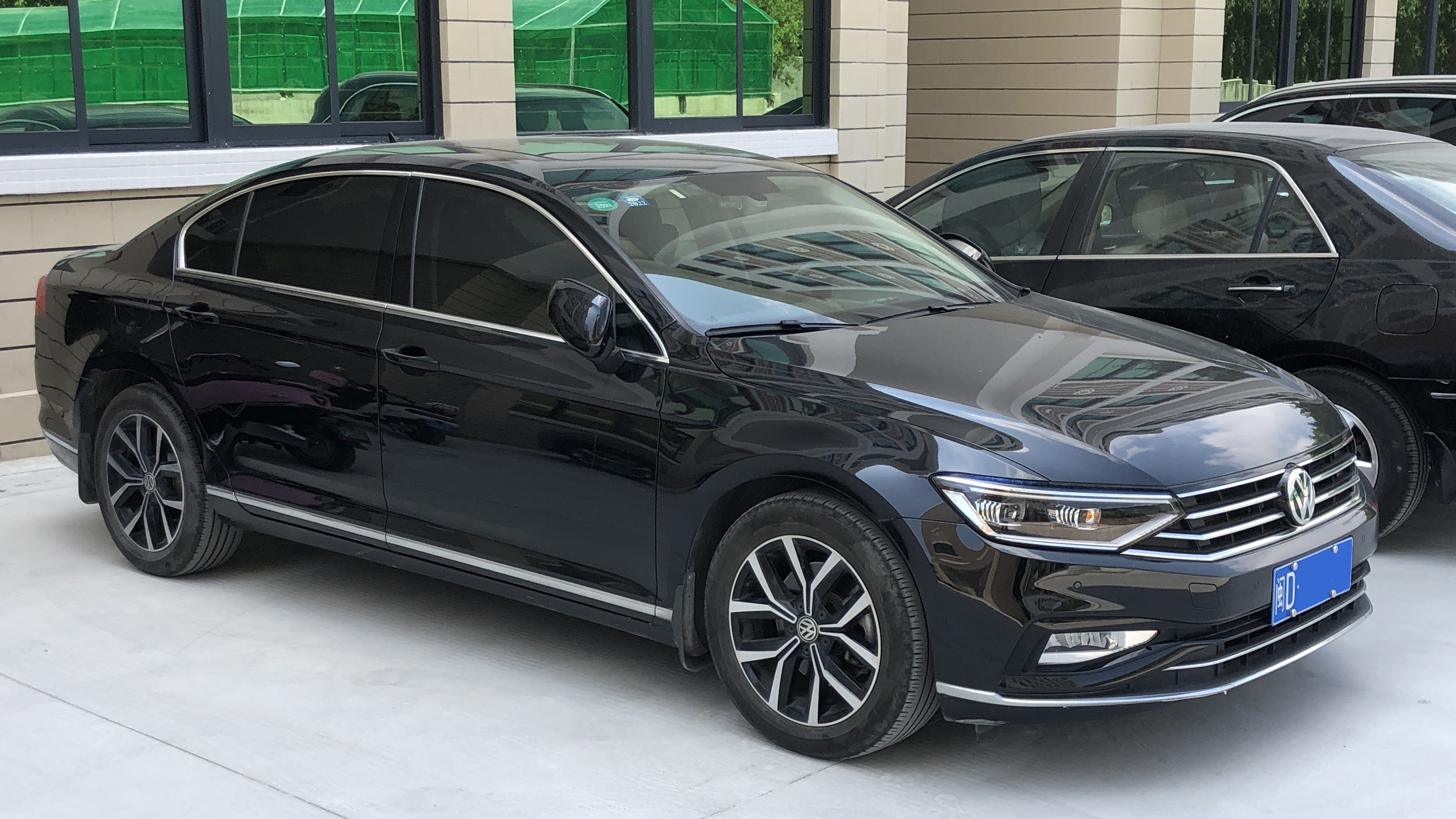
2016–2024
大众迈腾B8L
Volkswagen Magotan B8L

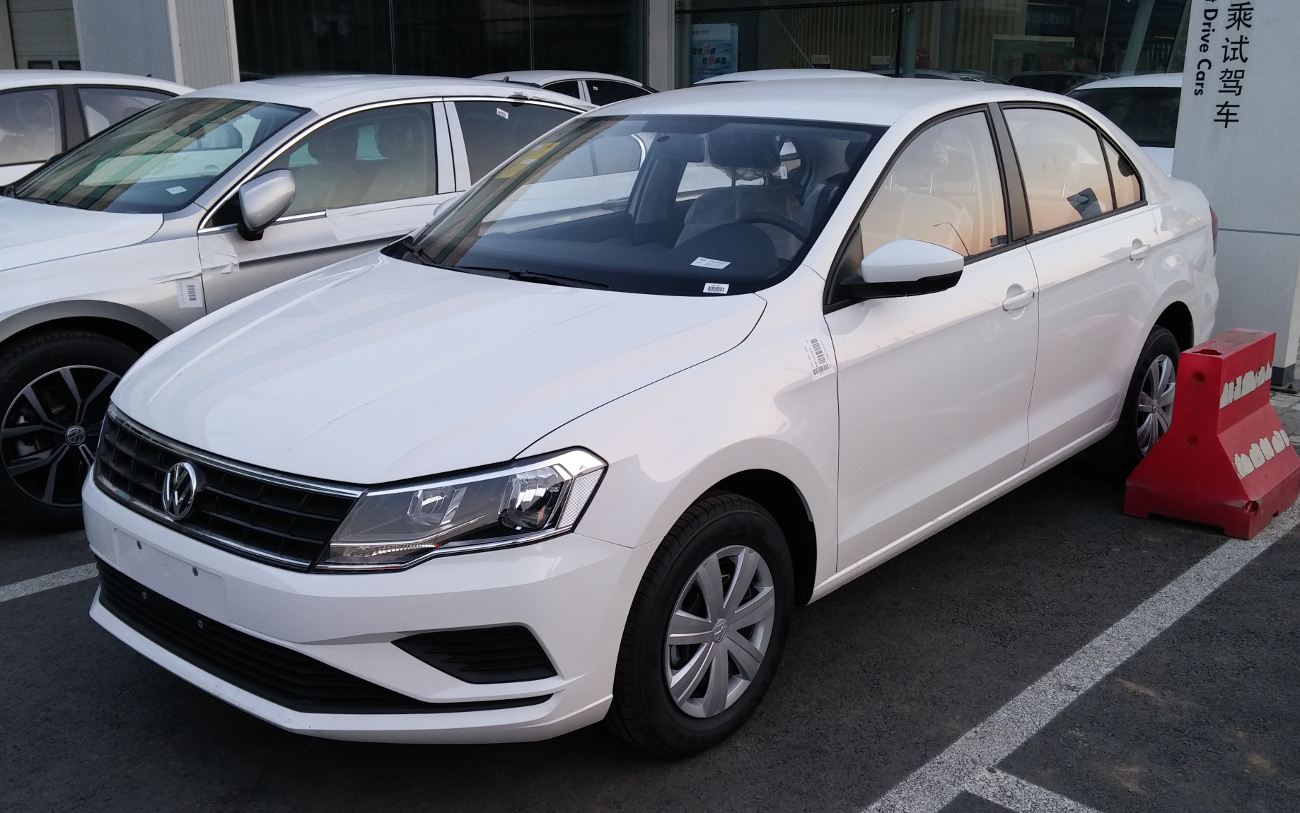
2013–2020
大众新捷达
Volkswagen New Jetta

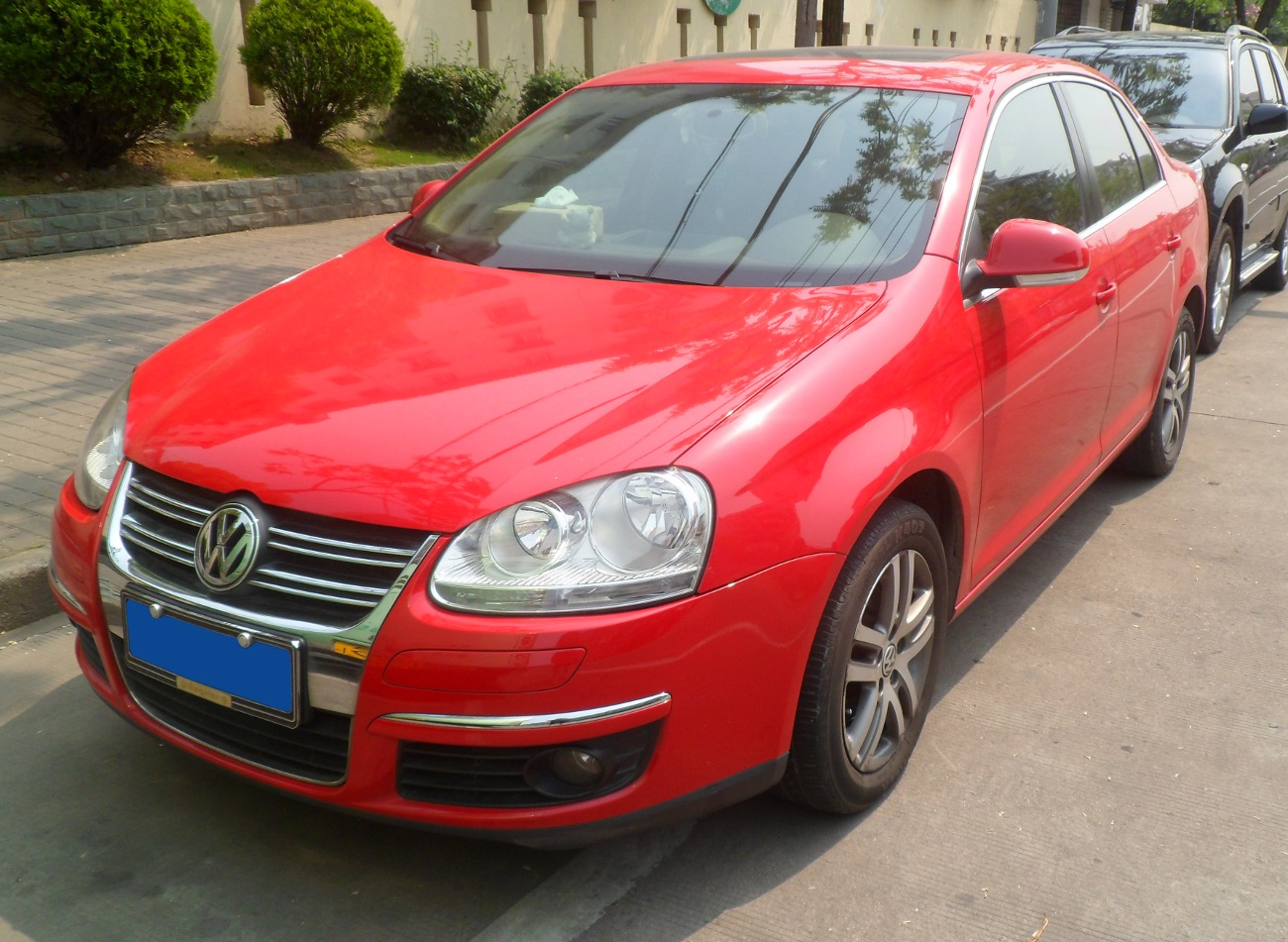
2006–2012
大众速腾A5
Volkswagen Sagitar A5

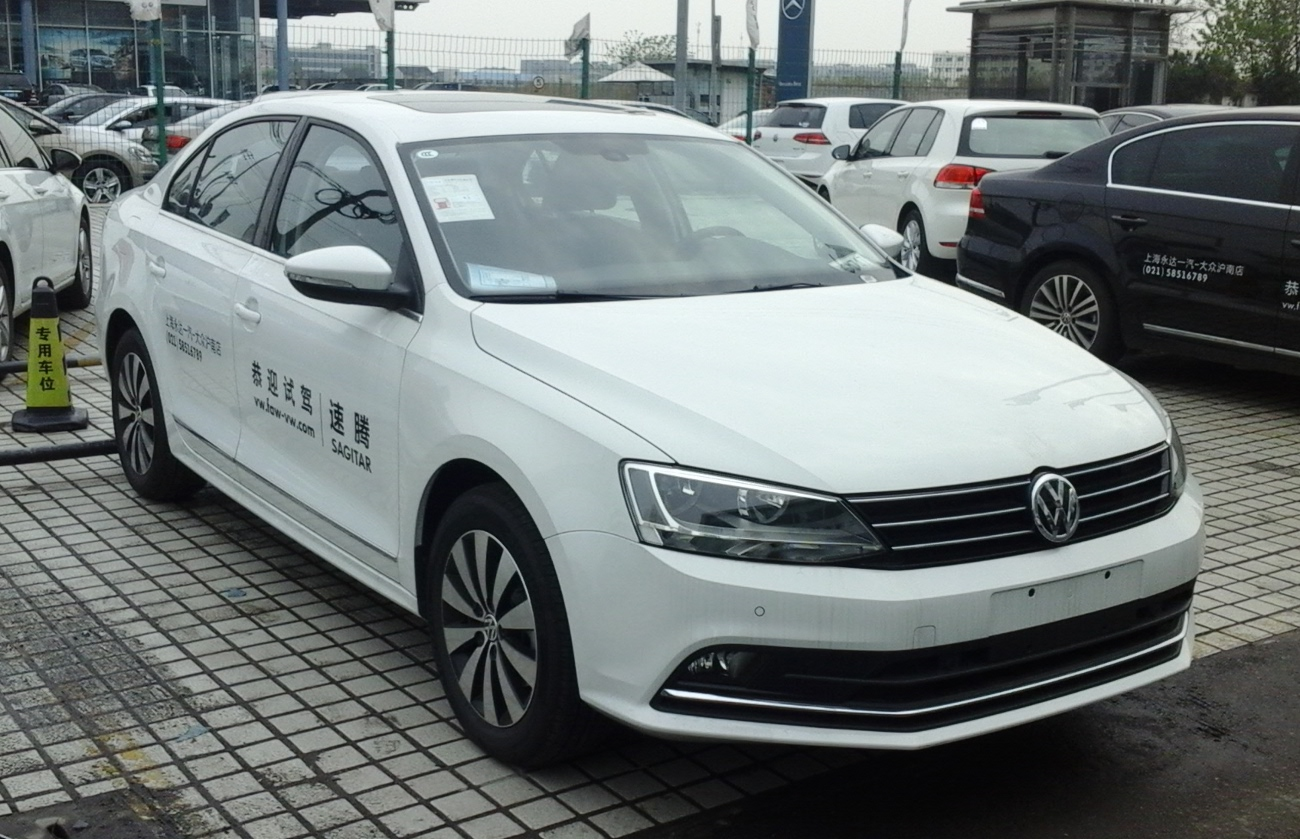
2012–2019
大众速腾A6
Volkswagen Sagitar A6

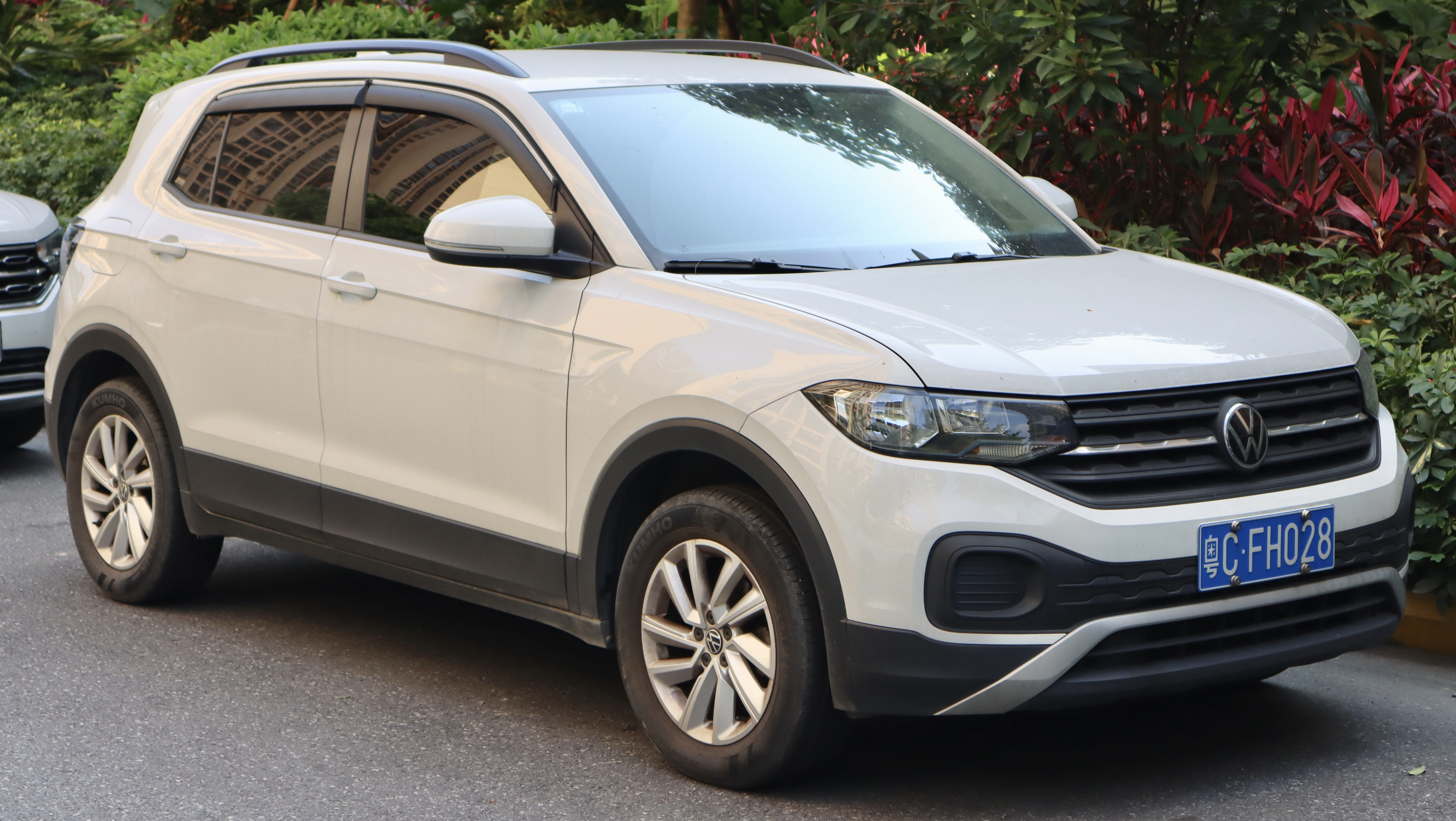
2019–2025
大众探影
Volkswagen Tacqua

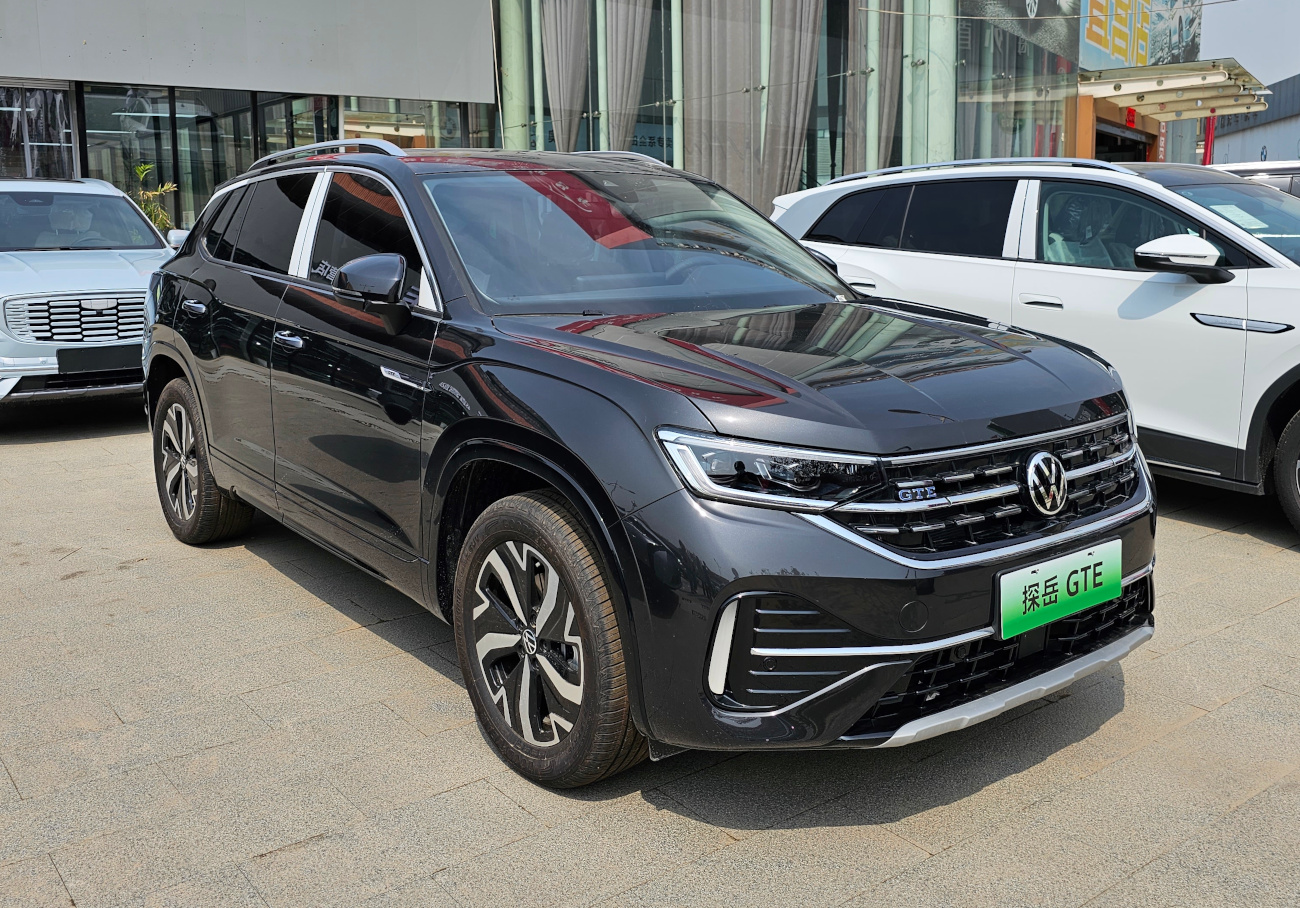
2020–2025
大众探岳GTE
Volkswagen Tayron GTE

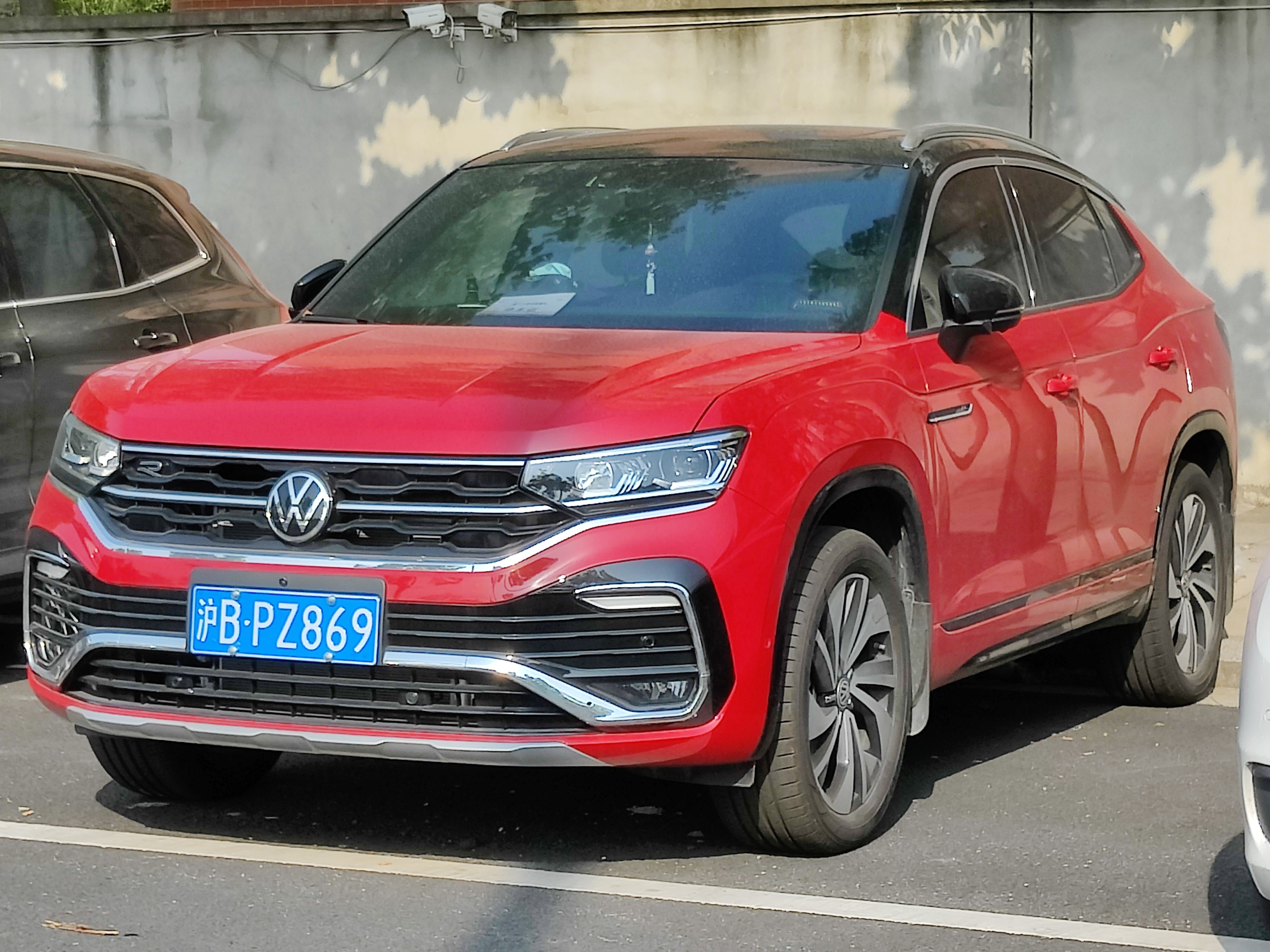
2020–2026
大众探岳X
Volkswagen Tayron X

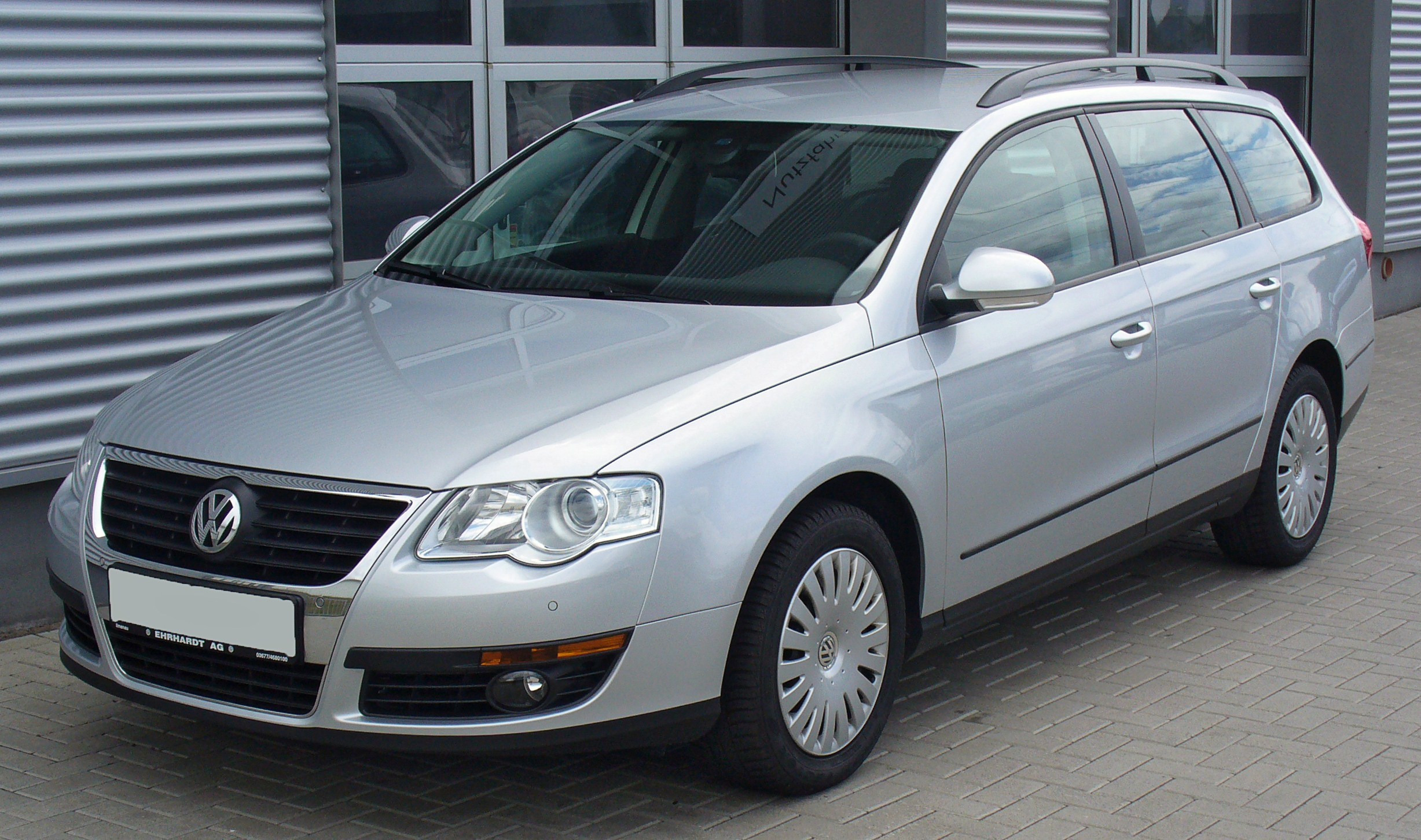
2010–2011
大众帕萨特B6
Volkswagen Variant B6

== Current powertrain range ==
- EA390 2.5T VR6 engine
- EA888 2.0T L4 engine
- EA211 1.4T & 1.5L L4 engine
- MQ200 5-speed MT
- AQ160 & AQ250 6-speed AT
- DQ200 & DQ381 & DQ500 7-speed DSG

== Sales ==
The following figures including VWs and Audis made by FAW-VW:

Year	1991	1992	1993	1994	1995	1996	1997	1998	1999	2000	2001	2002	2003
Annual Sales	–	7,617	12,500	7,179	18,649	25,441	38,586	62,452	78,755	111,049	130,761	207,858	298,006
Year	2004	2005	2006	2007	2008	2009	2010	2011					
Annual Sales	300,118	277,527	351,347	455,654	490,965	682,374	858,697	1,018,888					

== See also ==
- Volkswagen Group China
- SAIC Volkswagen
- Volkswagen Anhui
- FAW Group
- FAW Toyota
