= Cupra (marque) =

Spanish-German car brand

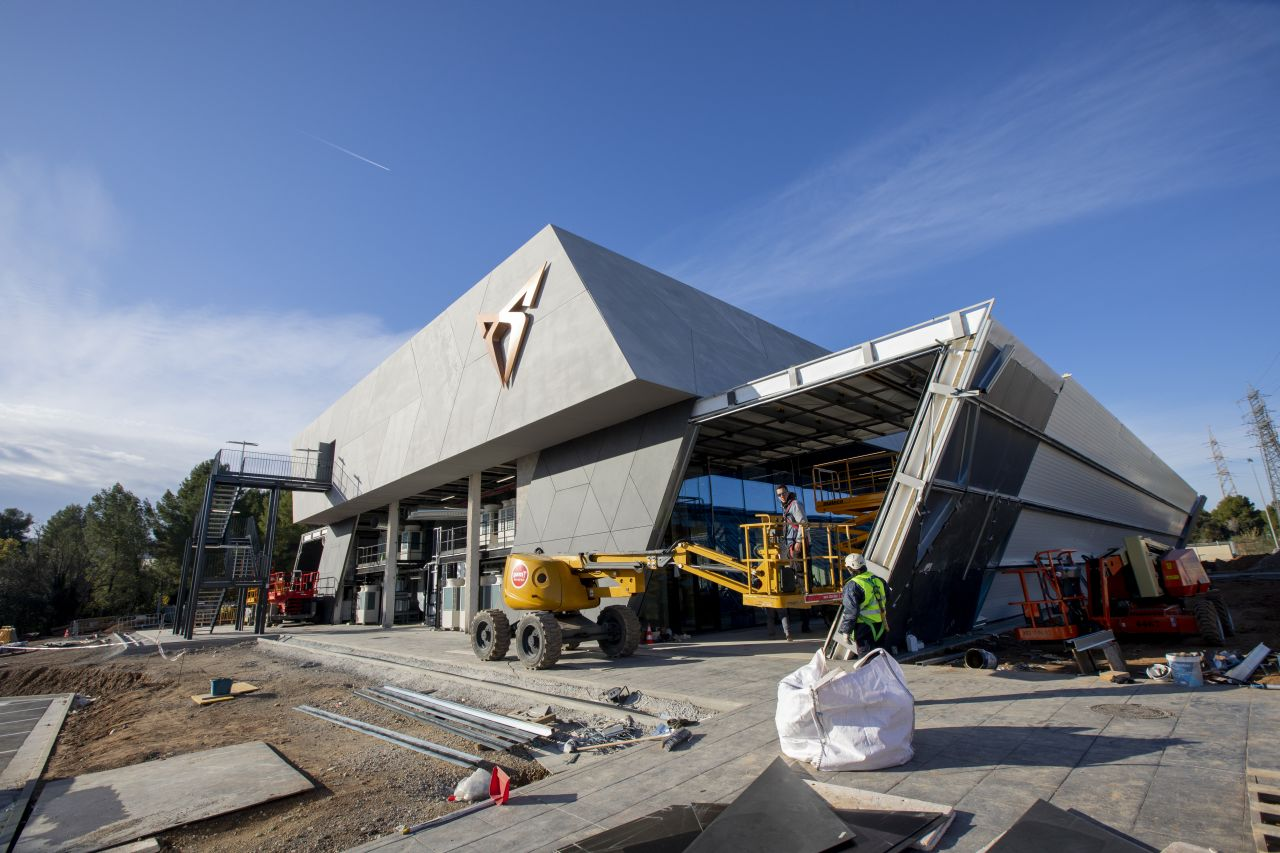
- Cupra Garage in Martorell, Spain
- Product type: Cars
- Current owner: Volkswagen Group
- Produced by: SEAT S.A.
- Country: Spain
- Introduced: 1996; 30 years ago (as part of SEAT); 2018; 8 years ago (as a standalone brand)
- Related brands: SEAT
- Markets: Europe, Middle East, Africa, Latin America, Singapore, Australia, and New Zealand
- Ambassador: Markus Haupt (Cupra brand CEO)
- Website: cupraofficial.com

Cupra (/ˈkuːprə/; stylised in all caps) is a car brand owned by Spanish car manufacturer SEAT S.A.U, part of Volkswagen Group, headquartered in Martorell, near Barcelona, Spain.

Originating from SEAT's motorsport division Cupra Racing, the Cupra brand was introduced as a standalone brand in January 2018, after being used as a performance sub-brand of SEAT since 1996. While initial Cupra models are based on SEAT vehicles, in September 2020, Cupra introduced the first Cupra-only vehicle, the Cupra Formentor. In 2021, the brand introduced its first electric car, the Cupra Born.

== History ==
Cupra originated from Cupra Racing (previously SEAT Sport), the high-performance motorsport subsidiary of SEAT. The "Cupra" name, short for "Cup Racing" was first used in 1996 by the SEAT Ibiza GTI 2.0 16V Cupra Sport, which was a street legal version of the Ibiza Mk2 kit car used in the competition and created as a special edition to celebrate SEAT's victory in the 1996 FIA 2-Litre World Rally Cup (a subdivision of the World Rally Championship at that time). It was followed by the SEAT Ibiza Cupra 1.8 20V in 1999, and the more powerful Ibiza Cupra R in 2000.

Over the following two decades, SEAT introduced a succession of hot hatchbacks marketed with the Cupra badge, such as the SEAT León Cupra 1.8 20V in 1999, and in the following year the SEAT Leon Cupra 4, which is the first AWD Cupra and the only six-cylinder Cupra. Since then, every SEAT León generation has been supplemented with a Cupra-badged hot hatch version.

In 2017, then SEAT CEO Luca de Meo hinted at the possibility of Cupra becoming a standalone brand. At that point, Cupra was only available as the performance version of the León. On 31 January 2018, SEAT confirmed that it is launching Cupra as a standalone brand, followed by an announcement event on 22 February 2018, in which prototypes of forthcoming Cupra models such as the Cupra Ateca were shown. SEAT's head of sales and marketing Wayne Griffiths planned to double Cupra sales within the following four to five years, helping SEAT achieve sustainable profitability. Cupra cars were to be sold in some SEAT dealerships in Europe, with dedicated floor space.

The Cupra logo of two intersecting triangles was designed by Alejandro Mesonero-Romanos. According to Mesonero-Romanos, the philosophy of the triangular logo is that a triangle is a dynamic shape, has a stable base, and points in a clear direction.

The first model from the standalone Cupra brand was the Cupra Ateca, introduced in October 2018. The Cupra León joined the line-up in February 2020, following the introduction of the SEAT León Mk4. In March 2020, Cupra introduced the Formentor after being previewed as a near-production concept vehicle at the Geneva International Motor Show in November 2019. It is the first Cupra product that is not shared with SEAT.

In February 2021, the Cupra Born was introduced as Cupra's first electric car. The concept version was called SEAT el-Born, but the Born became a Cupra-only model while remaining closely related to the Volkswagen ID.3. The second electric car from Cupra is the Tavascan, launched in April 2023, which was preceded by the Tavascan concept car shown at the 2019 Frankfurt Motor Show. It is the first Cupra model produced outside Europe, made by Volkswagen Anhui in China.

In March 2024, Cupra announced its intention to enter the U.S. market "by the end of the decade". The planned models to be sold are the next-generation electric Formentor, and an unnamed larger electric vehicle to be produced in Mexico.

In September 2026, Volkswagen was reported to be considering the discontinuation of the SEAT marque by the end of 2029, with Cupra expected to become the main commercial brand of SEAT S.A. The reported plan would not involve the closure of SEAT S.A. or the Martorell factory, but would instead transfer SEAT's products, dealerships and production activities to Cupra. SEAT S.A. stated that no final decision had been taken at the time of the reports.

== Products ==
=== Current vehicles ===
Body style	Model		Current generation		Vehicle description
Body style	Image	Name(s)	Introduction (cal. year)	Update (facelift)	Vehicle description
Hatchback		Born	2021	2026	Battery electric C-segment hatchback based on the Volkswagen ID.3. Built on a dedicated electric vehicle platform, MEB.
Hatchback		León	2020	2024	Performance version of the SEAT León.
Hatchback		Raval	2026		Battery electric B-segment hatchback. Built on a dedicated electric vehicle platform, MEB Entry.
Estate		León Sportstourer	2020	2024	Performance version of the SEAT León Sportstourer/Estate.
Crossover SUV		Formentor	2020	2024	C-segment SUV based on the León. First standalone model for Cupra.
Crossover SUV		Tavascan	2023	2026	Battery electric C-segment coupe SUV built on a dedicated electric vehicle platform, MEB.
Crossover SUV		Terramar	2024	-	C-segment SUV.

=== Former vehicles ===
- Cupra Ateca - the Cupra brand's first model, produced from 2018 until 2026.

=== Concept cars ===
- Cupra Ibiza (2018)
- Cupra Tavascan (2019)
- Cupra Formentor (2019)
- Cupra UrbanRebel (2021)
- Cupra DarkRebel (2023)
- Cupra Tindaya (2025)
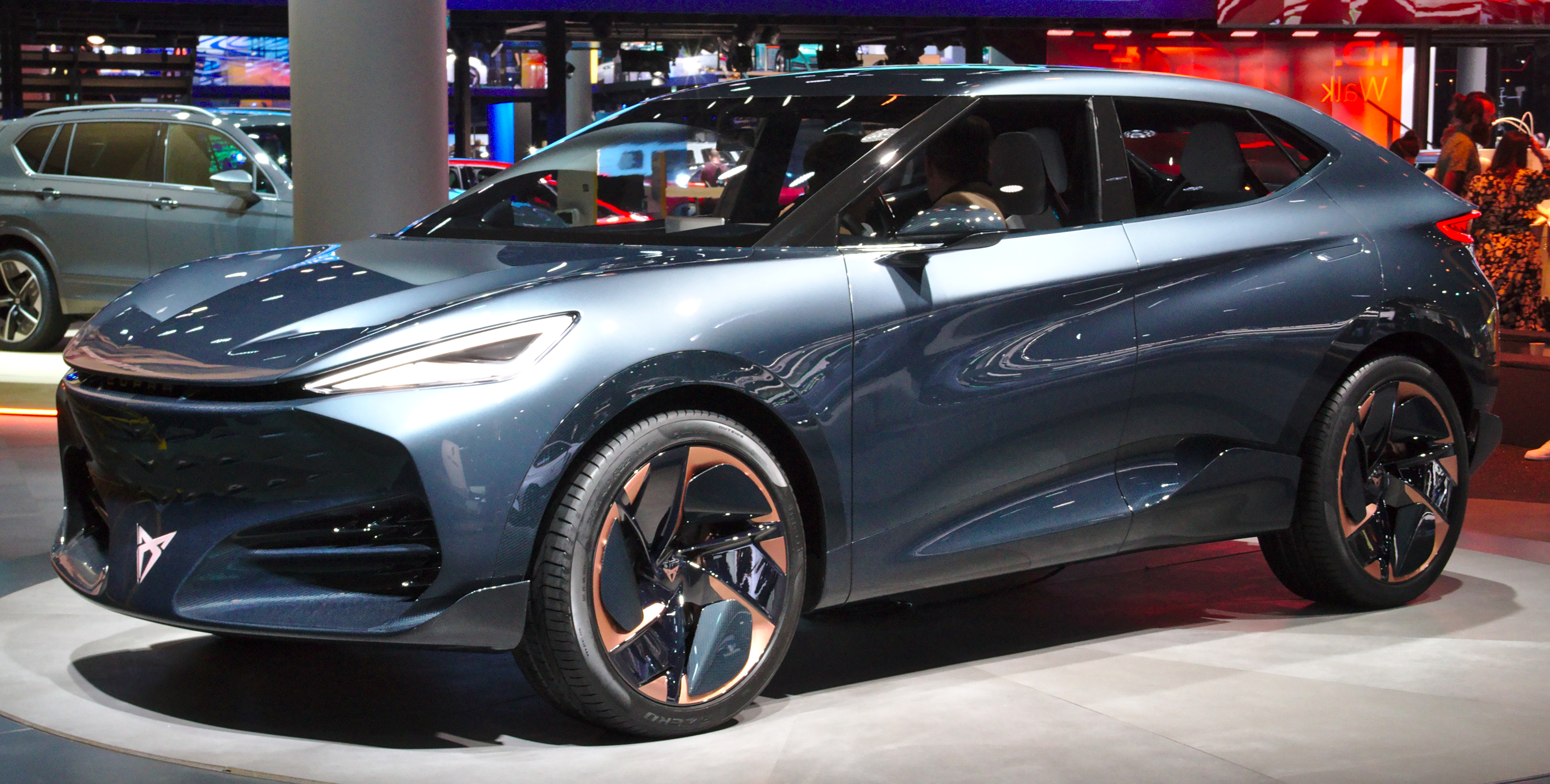
Cupra Tavascan (2019)

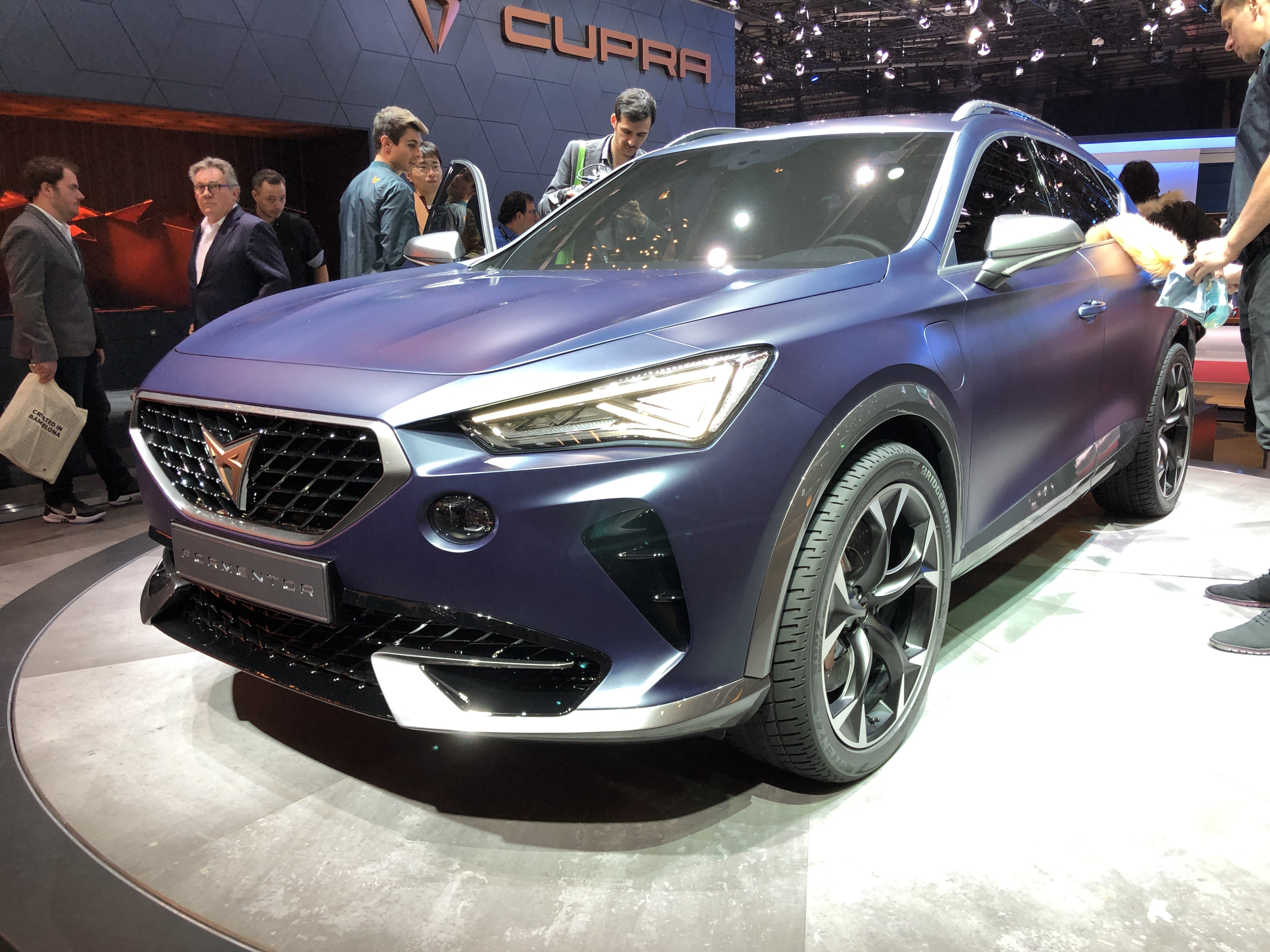
Cupra Formentor (2019)

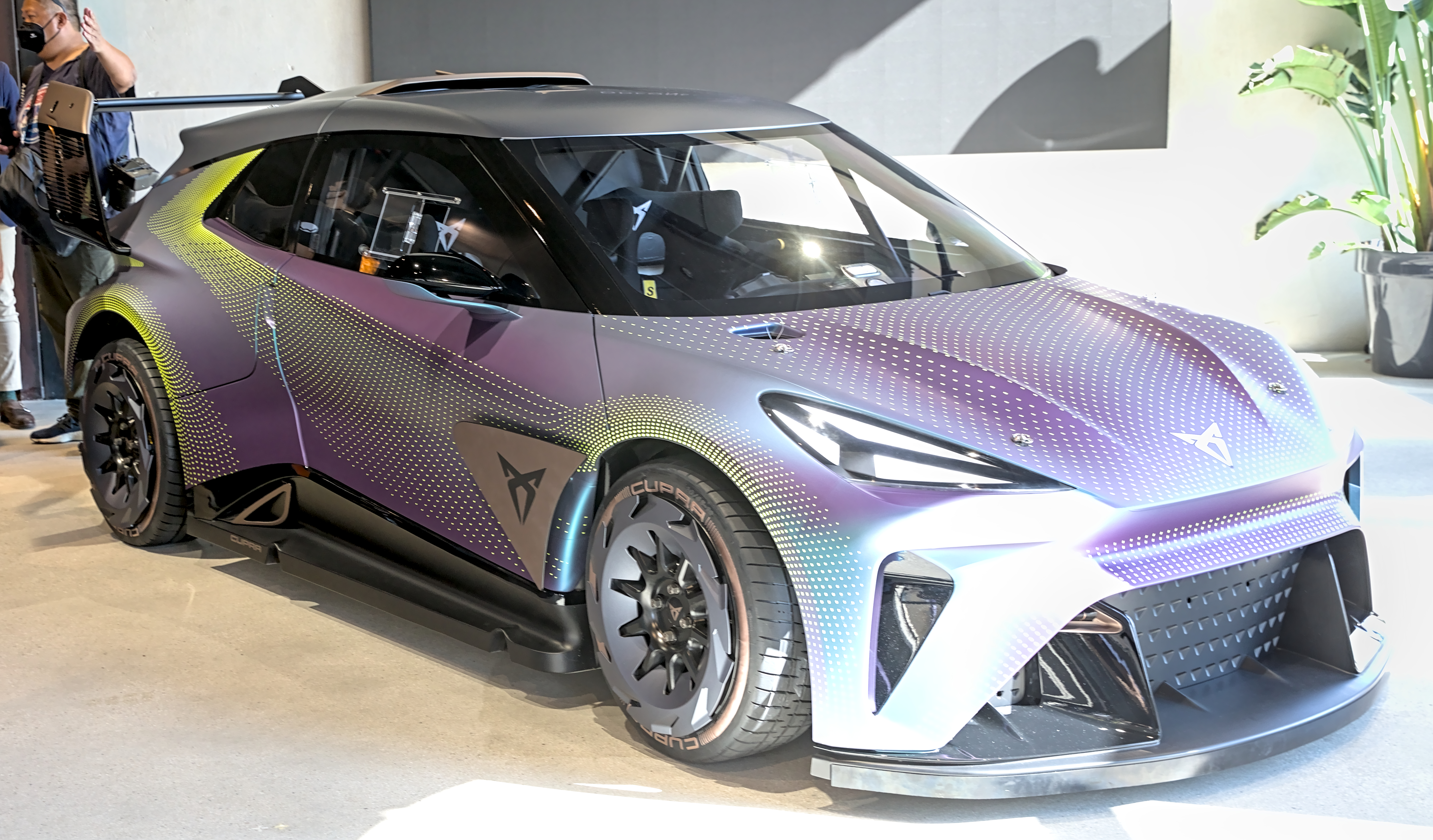
Cupra Urban Rebel (2021)

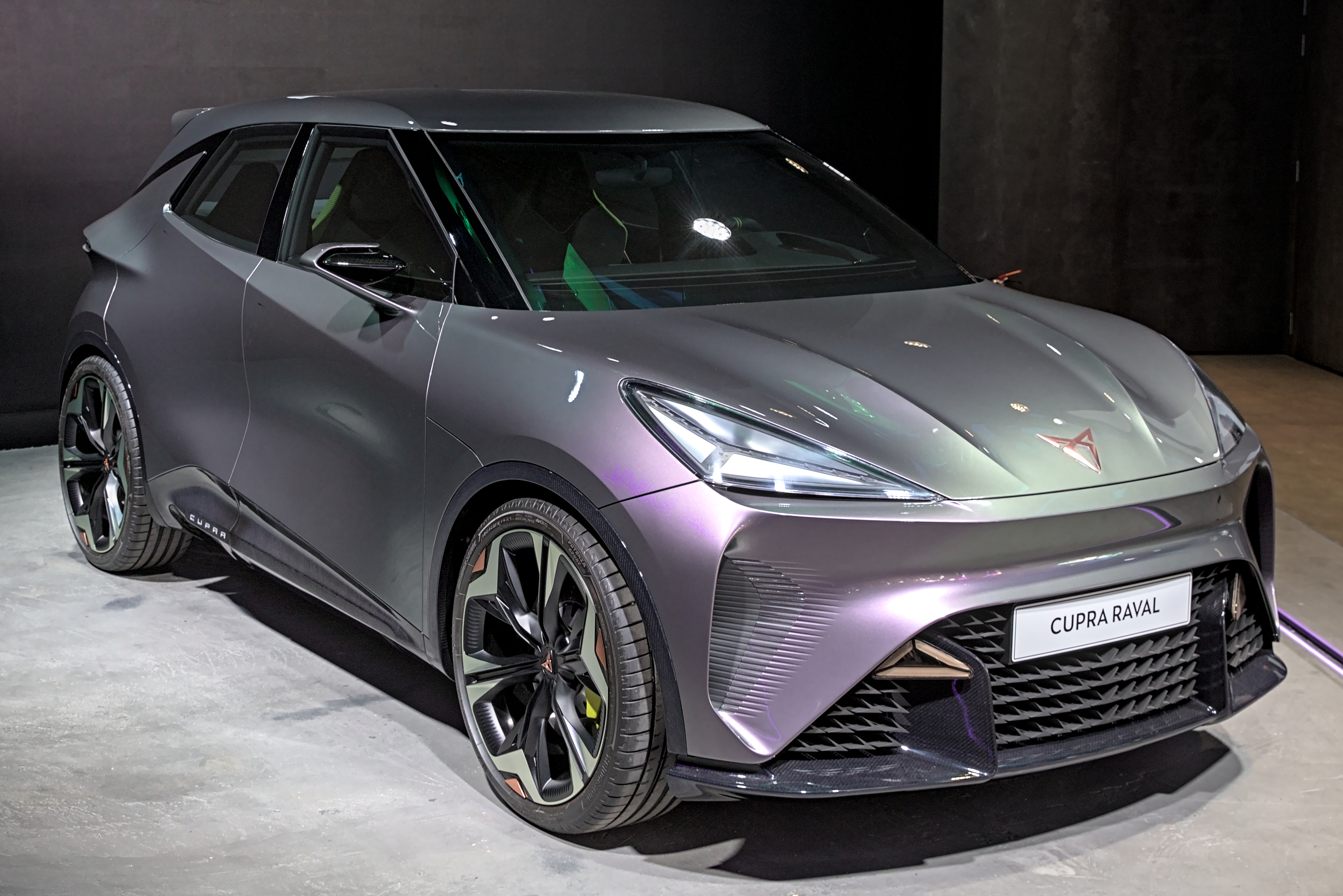
Cupra Raval (2022)

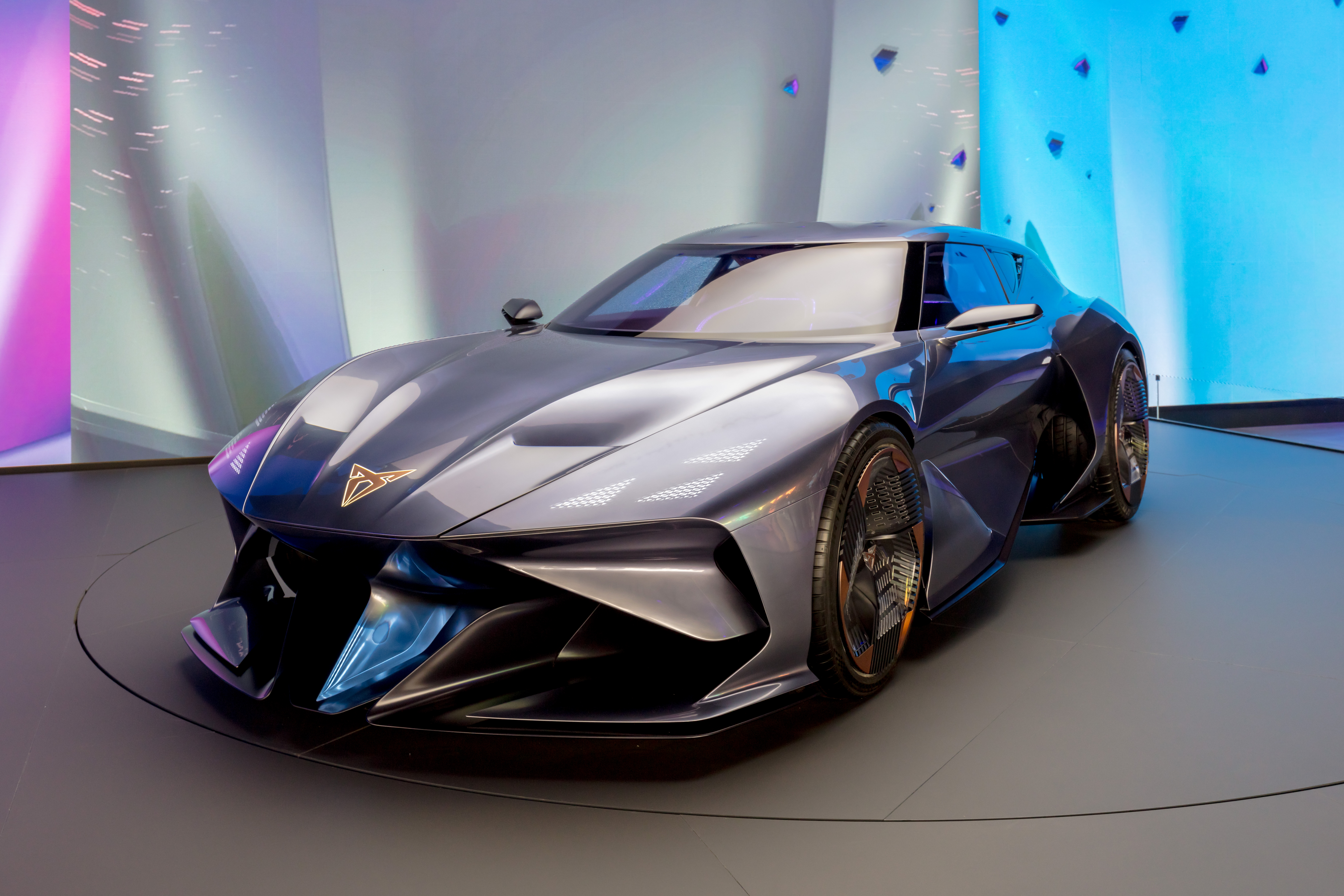
Cupra DarkRebel Concept (2023)

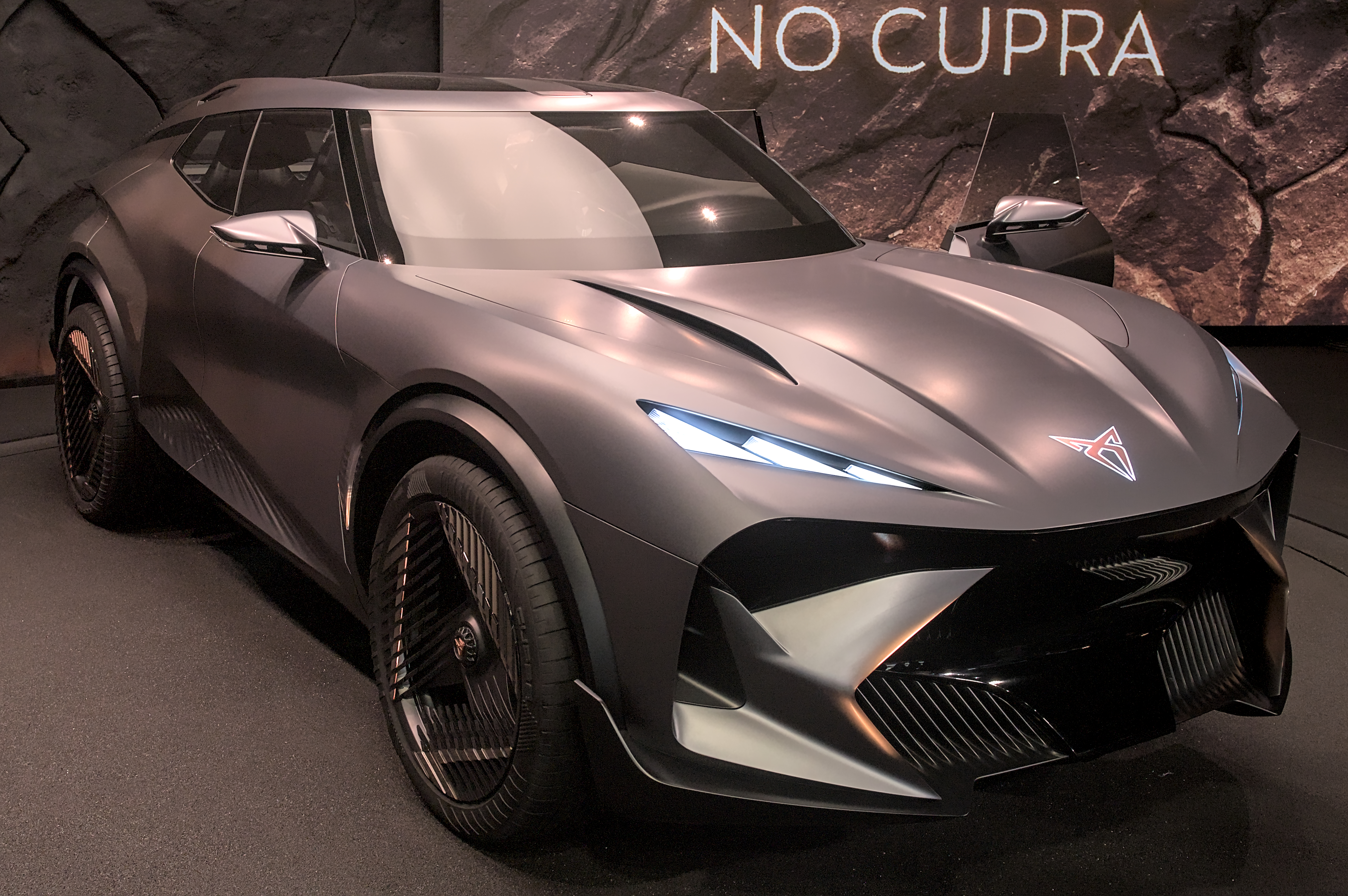
Cupra Tindaya Concept (2025)

=== Racing cars ===
- Cupra E-TCR (2018)
- Cupra E-Racer (2020)
- Cupra Tavascan Extreme E Concept (2021)
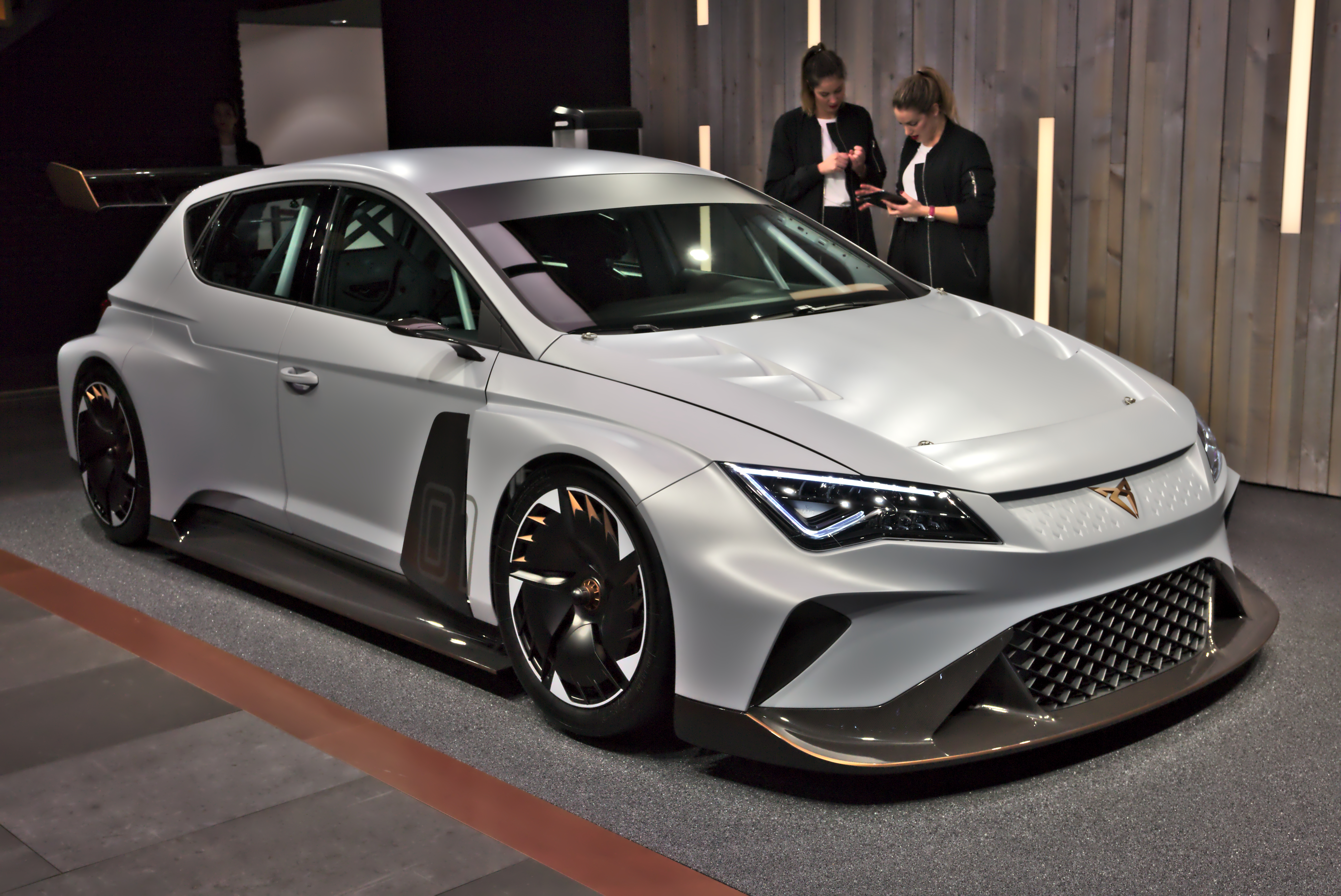
Cupra E-TCR (2018)

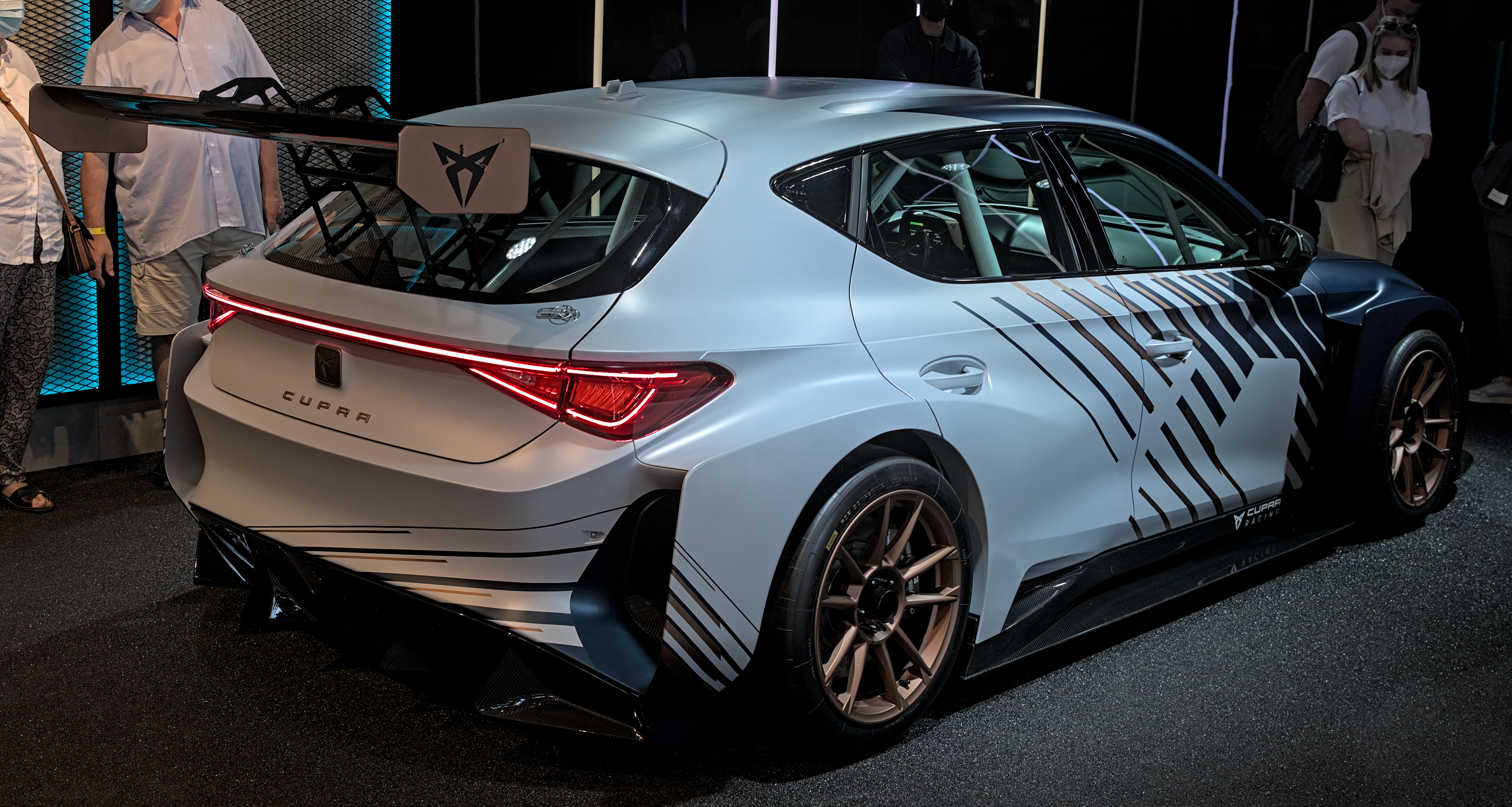
Cupra E-Racer (2020)

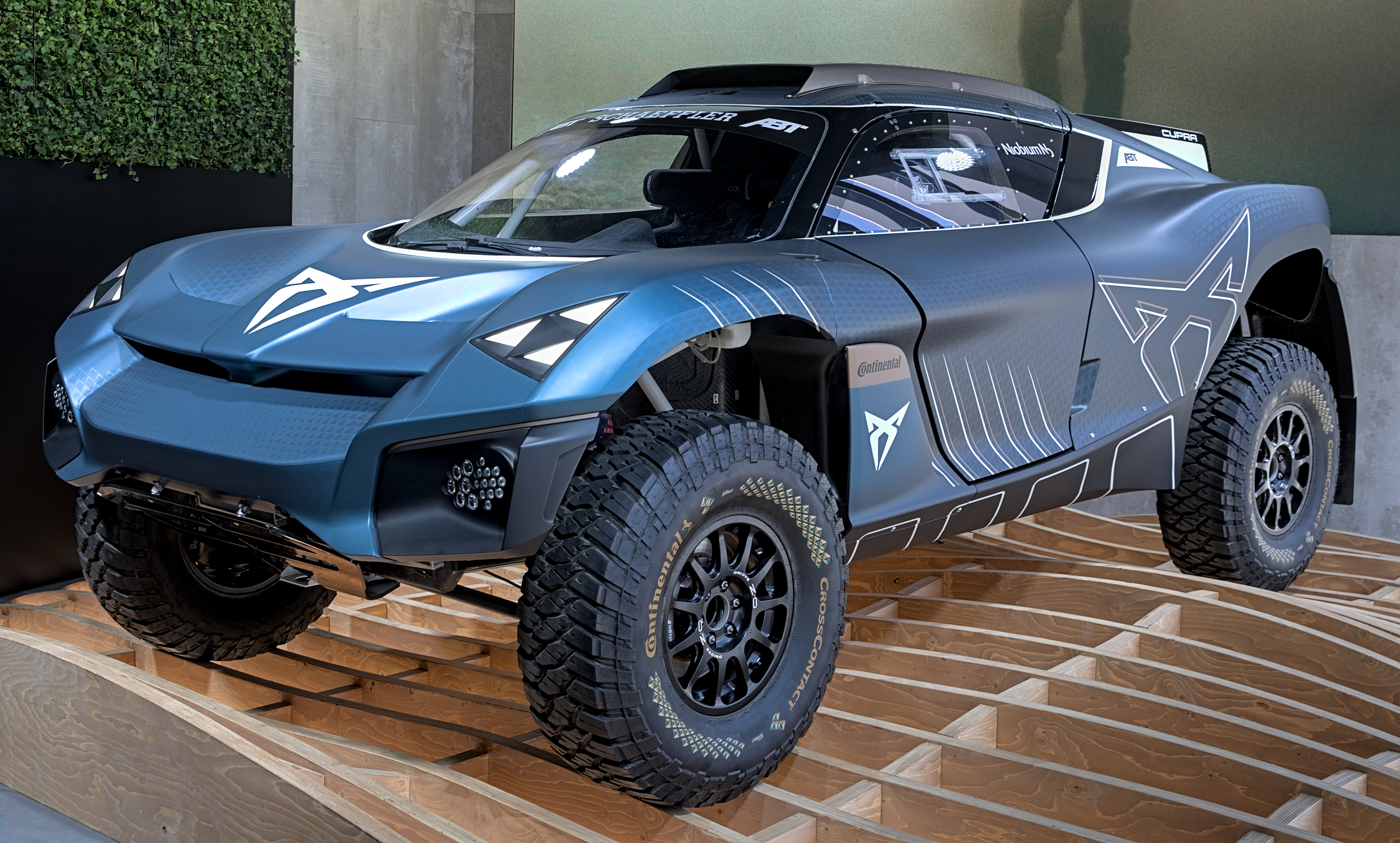
Cupra Tavascan Extreme E (2021)

=== Yacht ===
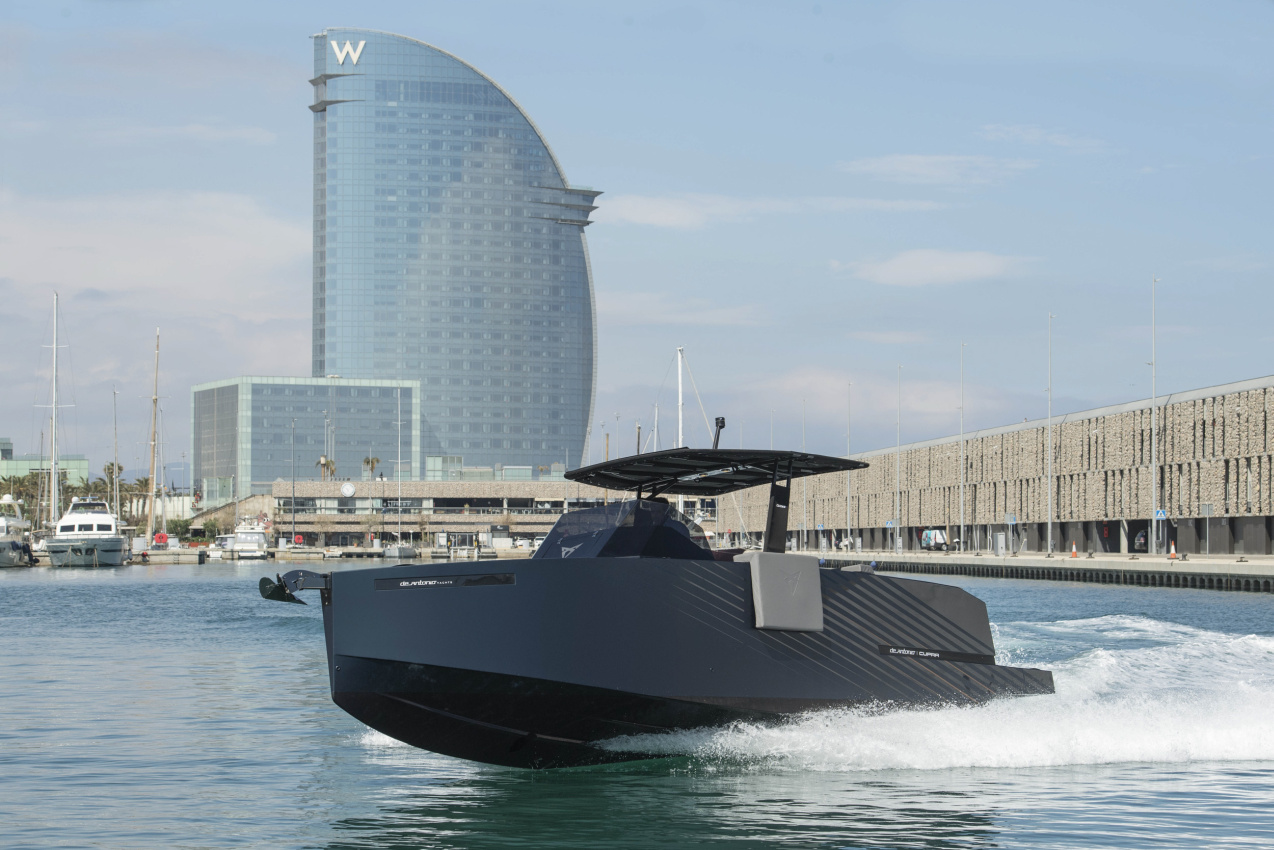
De Antonio Yachts D28 Formentor

De Antonio Yachts D28 Formentor is a yacht introduced in July 2021 as a collaborative project between Barcelona-based shipbuilder De Antonio Yachts and Cupra's Color & Trim division. Its design was said to be inspired by the Cupra Formentor VZ5.

== Production figures ==
Year	Models				Total
Year	Ateca	León	Formentor	Born	Total
2020	N/A	N/A	11,041	-	N/A
2021	4,505	13,670	58,863	4,801	81,839
2022	8,841	20,070	105,568	36,153	170,632
2023	14,228	62,103	124,670	45,748	246,749
