= Volkswagen 3 =

Volkswagen 3 may refer to:

- Volkswagen Type 3 (1961–1973)
- Volkswagen ID.3 (2019–)
