= Cupra Born =

Battery electric hatchback

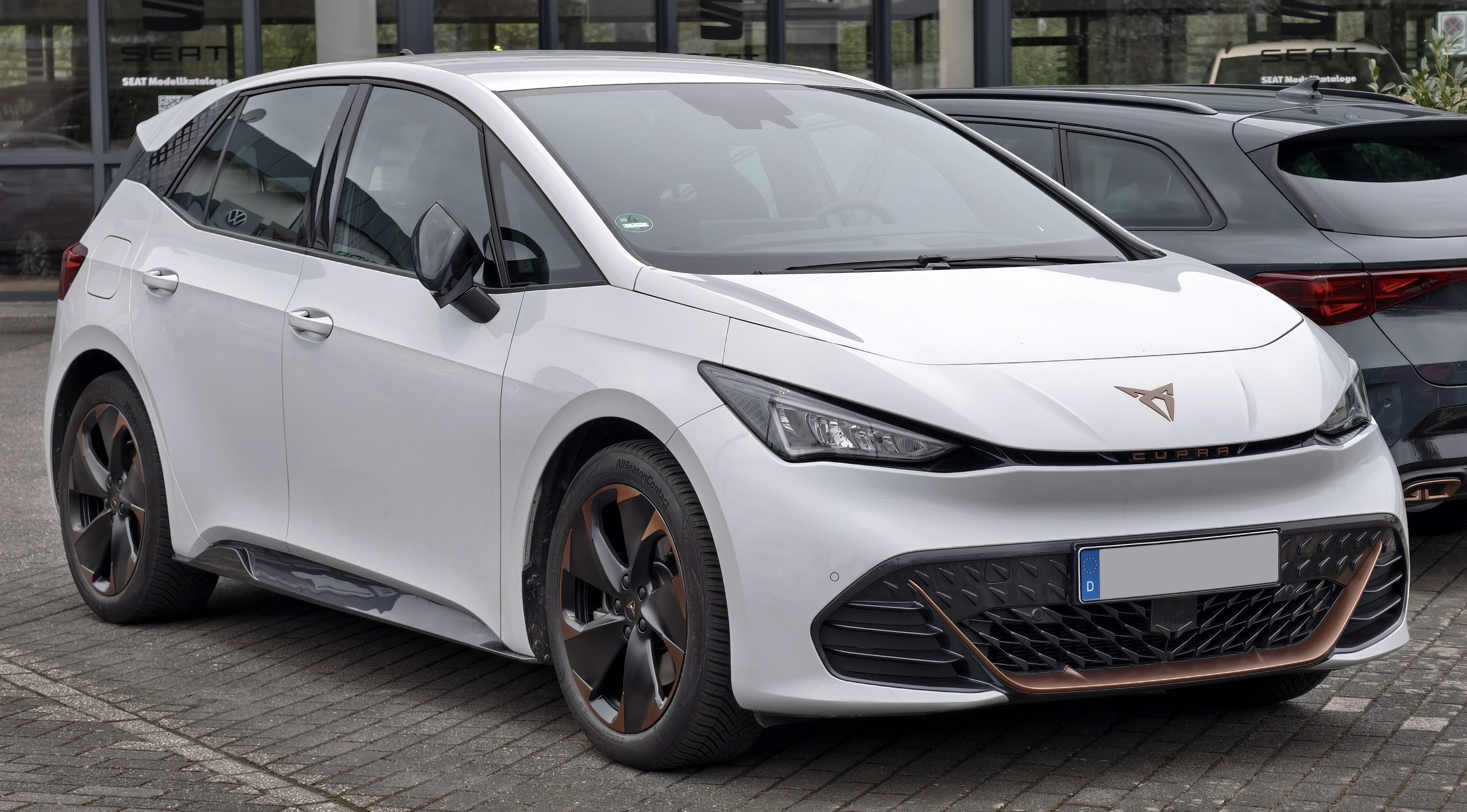
- Cupra Born

Overview
- Manufacturer: SEAT
- Production: September 2021 – present
- Assembly: Germany: Zwickau (Volkswagen Zwickau-Mosel Plant)
- Designer: Alberto Torrecillas (exterior); Tsanko Petrov (interior)

Body and chassis
- Class: Small family car (C)
- Body style: 5-door hatchback
- Layout: Rear-motor, rear-wheel-drive
- Platform: Volkswagen Group MEB
- Related: Volkswagen ID.3; Volkswagen ID.4/ID.5; Škoda Enyaq; Škoda Elroq; Audi Q4 e-tron

Powertrain
- Electric motor: APP 310 permanent magnet brushless motor
- Battery: 45–77 kWh lithium-ion

Dimensions
- Wheelbase: 2,765 mm (108.9 in)
- Length: 4,322 mm (170.2 in)
- Width: 1,809 mm (71.2 in)
- Height: 1,537 mm (60.5 in)

The Cupra Born is a battery electric small family car (C-segment) marketed by SEAT through its performance-oriented Cupra marque. Initially unveiled as the SEAT el-Born concept in 2019, the production car was revealed in May 2021 as the Cupra Born. The Born is based on the Volkswagen Group MEB platform and has been manufactured at the same plant in Zwickau, Germany, as the MEB-based Volkswagen ID.3. The car is named after a neighbourhood in Barcelona, Catalonia, Spain.

== Overview ==
=== Concept ===
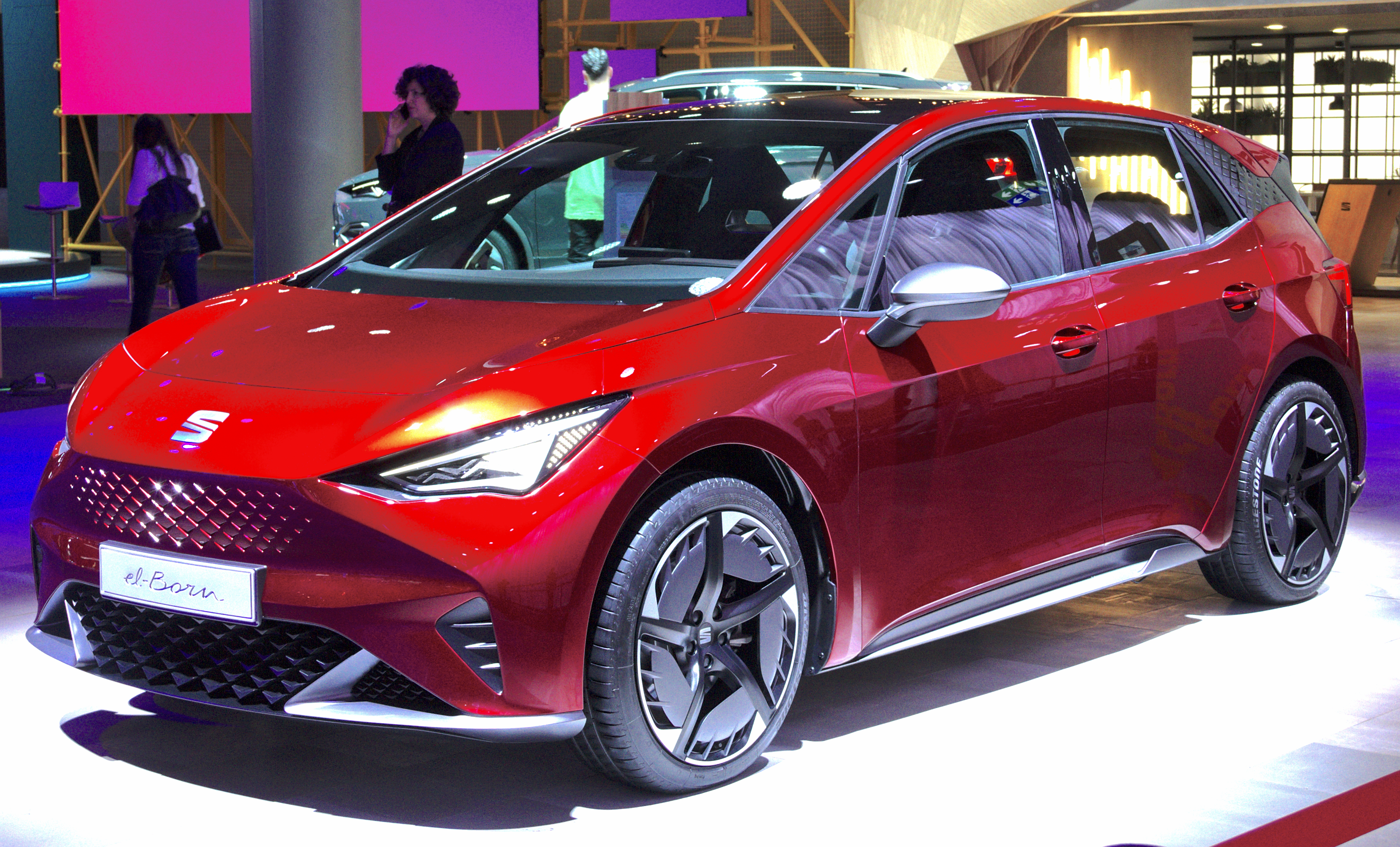
SEAT el-Born Concept at IAA 2019

The vehicle was previewed as the SEAT el-Born, which was unveiled in March 2019 Geneva Motor Show. The prototype car was fitted with a 62 kWh battery pack, with a claimed 420 km (261 mi) range (WLTP). It was powered by a 150 kW (204 PS; 201 bhp) electric motor, able to accelerate to 0–100 km/h (0–62 mph) in 7.5 seconds. The battery is compatible with 100 kW DC supercharging, and features a thermal management system. It featured a driver assistance systems, and is capable of Level 2 Autonomous Driving.

=== Production version ===
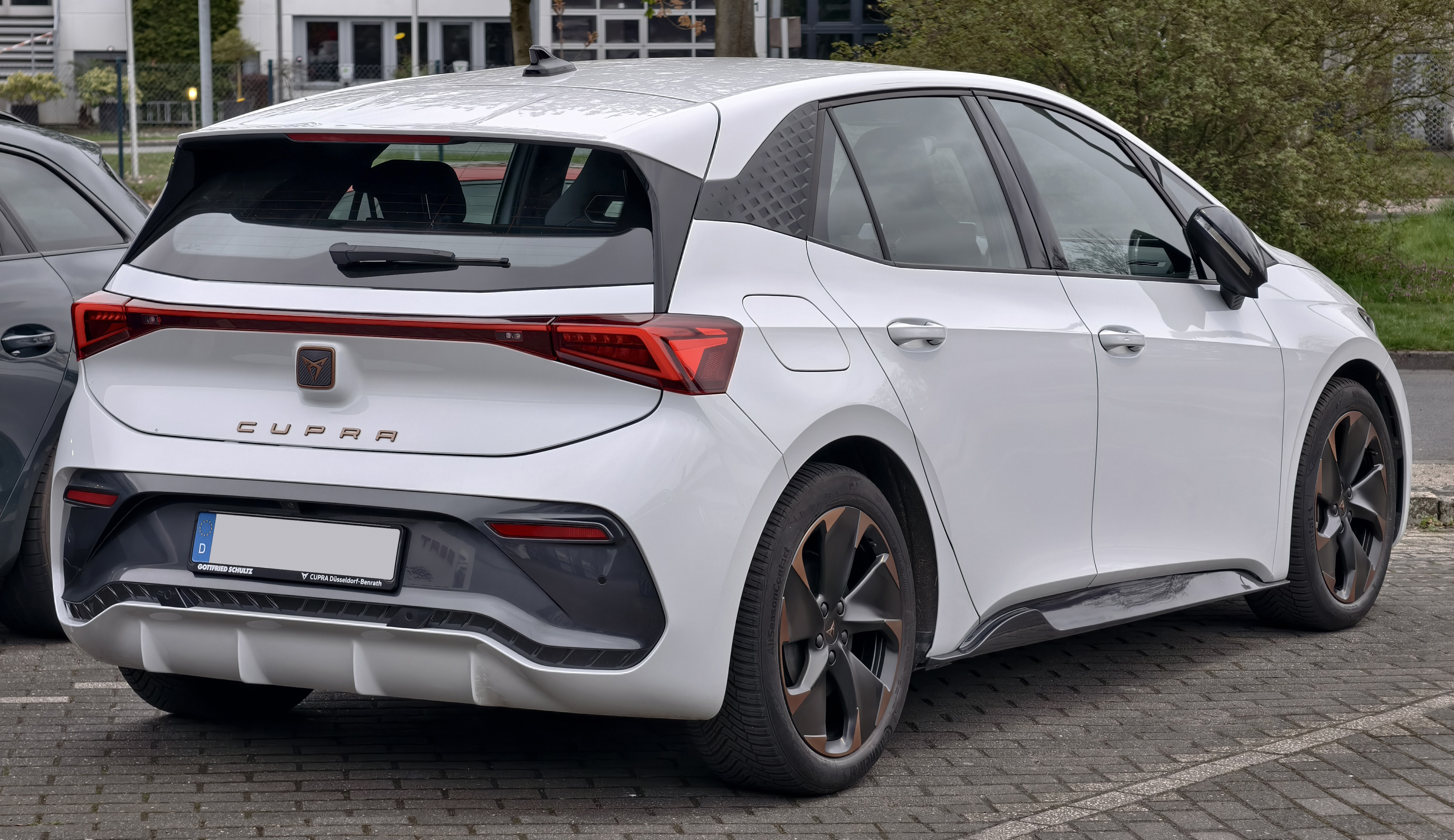
Rear view

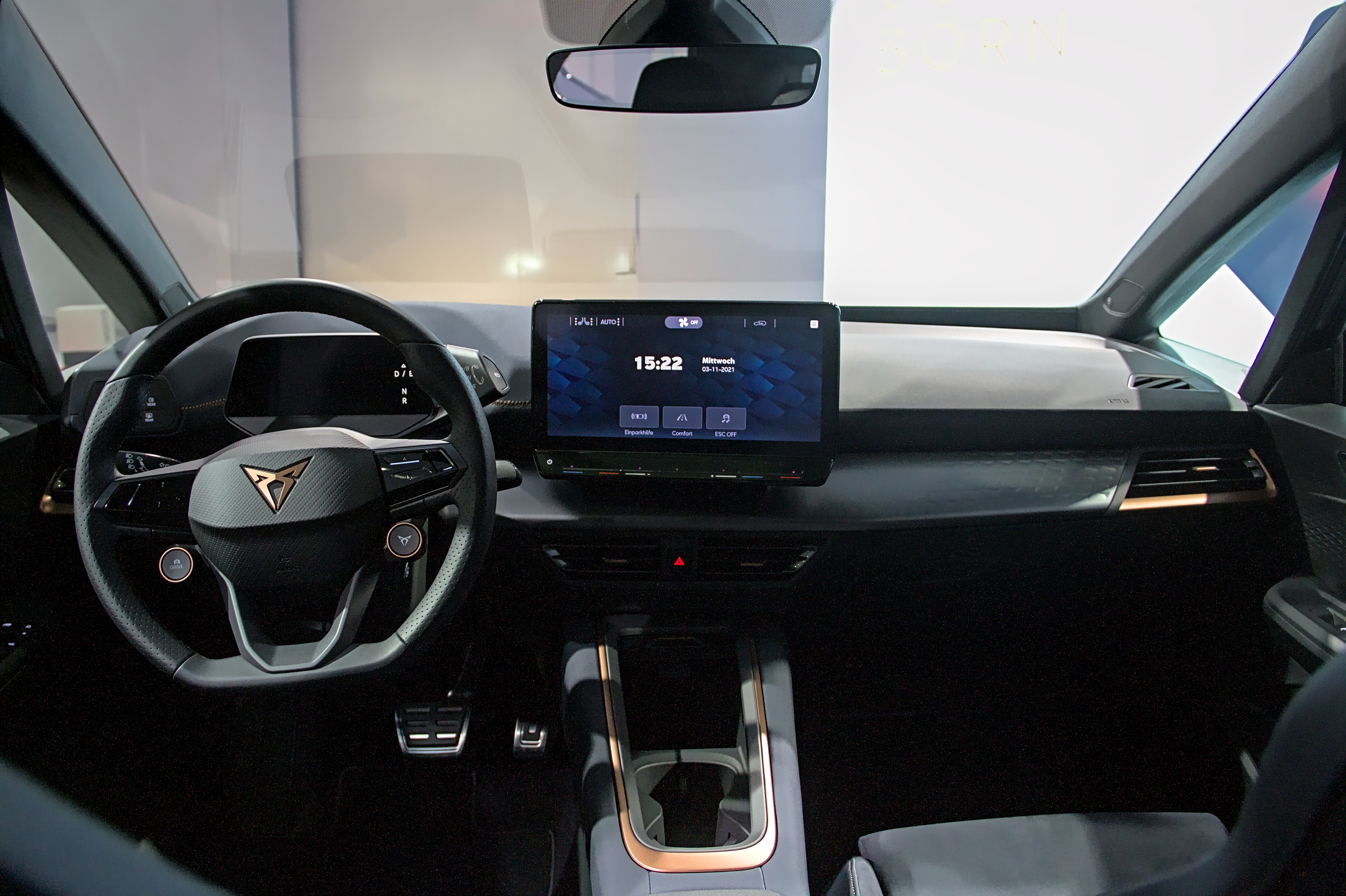
Interior

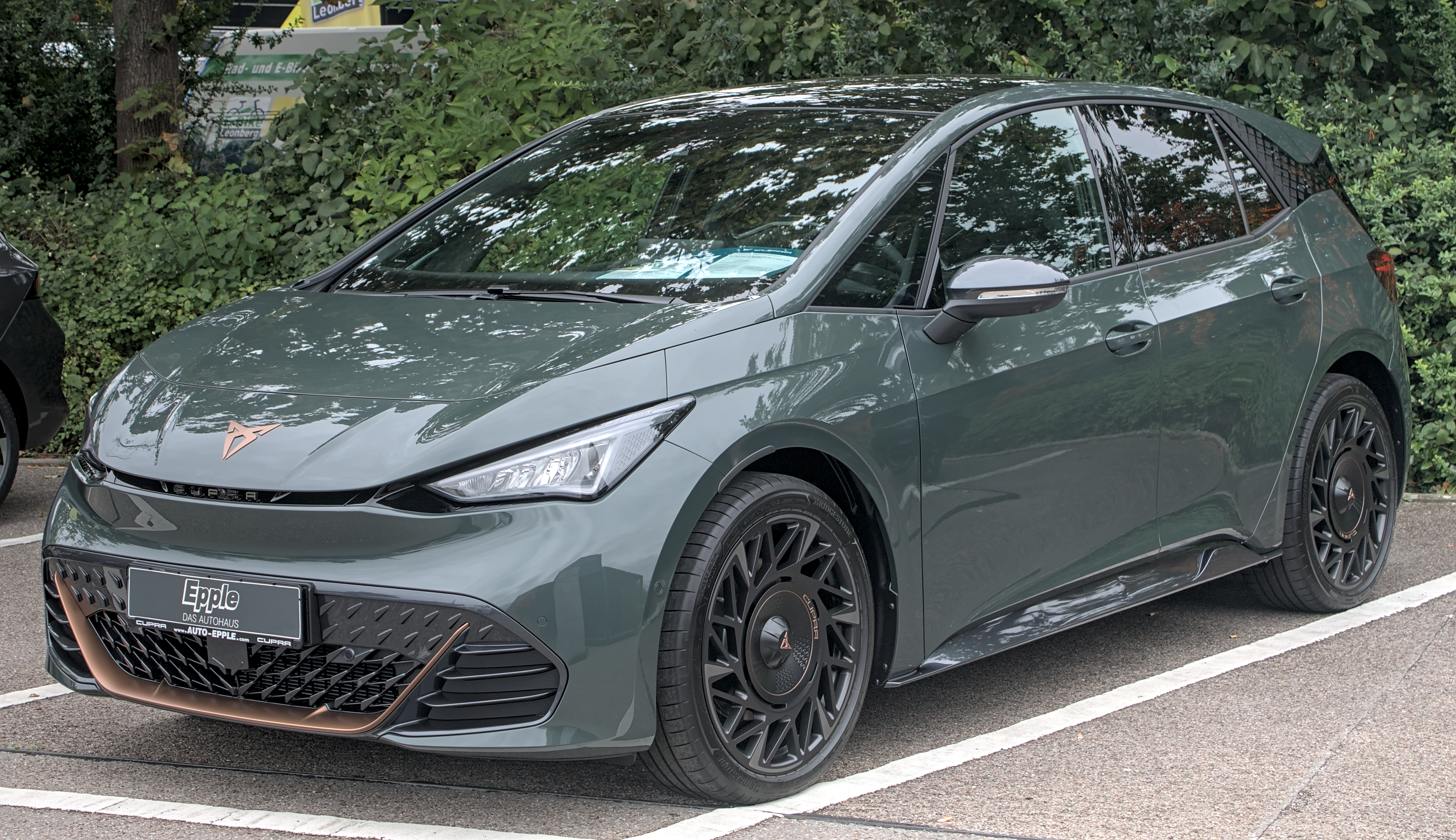
Cupra Born VZ (Front view)

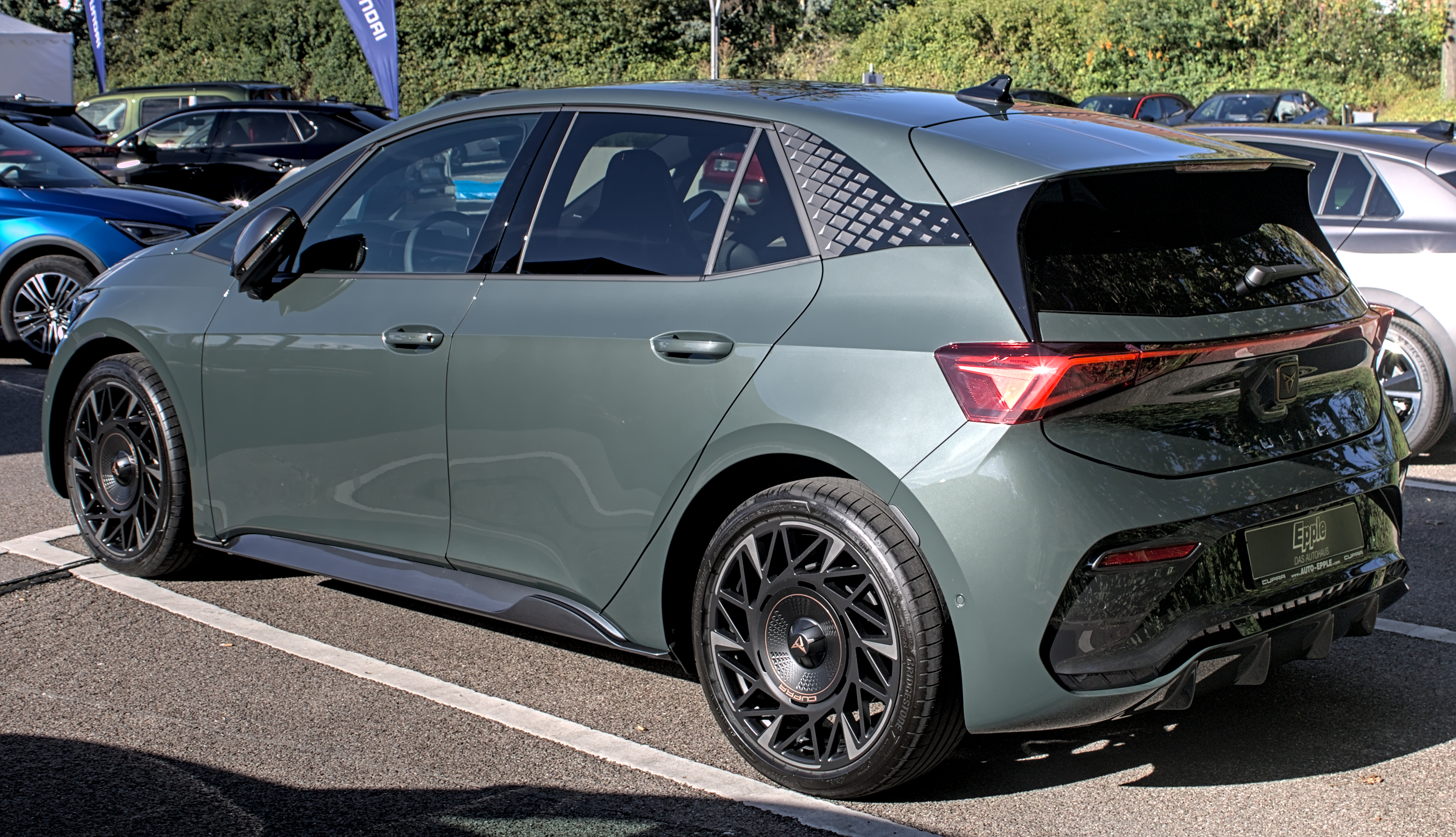
Rear view

Production of the Born was confirmed in July 2020, and it is sold under the Cupra brand. The production car would have a larger battery pack than the prototype. The car was renamed to Cupra Born in February 2021, therefore dropping the "el-" from the name. It was expected to cost around £40,000, which is noted to be around the price of the higher end models of the Volkswagen ID.3.

The Born had its official premiere in May 2021. At launch there was an option of two powertrains, a base electric motor of 110 kW (150 PS; 148 hp) with rear-wheel drive, and a more powerful model with a rear motor of 150 kW (204 PS; 201 hp) and 310 N⋅m (229 lb⋅ft), which develops a combined 170 kW (231 PS; 228 hp). With Boost Mode, it took 6.6 seconds for the flagship model to accelerate to 100 km/h (62 mph). In 2024 the more powerful VZ was introduced, with a motor of 240 kW (326 PS; 322 hp) and 545 N⋅m (402 lb⋅ft), which achieves 5.6 seconds from standing to 100 km/h (62 mph).

At launch it had three battery capacities of 45 kWh for the cheapest version and 55 kWh and 77 kWh for the higher-end models, with ranges from 340 to 540 km (210 to 340 mi). Charging on a fast charger up to 80% battery takes 35–60 minutes depending on the battery size, and according to Cupra, will increase range by 100 kilometers in 7 minutes. The interior features a 300 mm (12.0 in) touchscreen, sports seats with integrated headrests and a head-up display. Equipment also includes adaptive cruise control, Travel Assist system for semi-autonomous driving, traffic sign recognition, automatic braking system, Dynamic Chassis Control Sport suspension. Production started in September 2021.

== Facelift ==
In March 2026, the Cupra Born received a facelift. It includes traditional steering wheel buttons, improved materials, redesigned triangular headlights and taillights and a new Android-based infotainment system.

== Powertrain ==
Type	Battery (usable)	Layout	Electric motor	Power	Torque	0–100 km/h (62 mph) (claimed)	Range (claimed)		Charging		Calendar years
Type	Battery (usable)	Layout	Electric motor	Power	Torque	0–100 km/h (62 mph) (claimed)	WLTP (max)	WLTP (min)	AC (max)	DC (max)	Calendar years
Born 45	55 (45) kWh lithium-ion	RWD	APP 310	110 kW (150 PS; 148 hp)	310 N⋅m (229 lb⋅ft)	8.9 s	349 km (217 mi)		7.2 kW	100 kW	Cancelled
Born 58	62 (58) kWh lithium-ion	RWD	APP 310	150 kW (204 PS; 201 hp)	310 N⋅m (229 lb⋅ft)	7.3 s	426 km (265 mi)	376 km (234 mi)	11 kW	120 kW	2021–2024
Born 58	62 (58) kWh lithium-ion	RWD	APP 310	170 kW (231 PS; 228 hp)	310 N⋅m (229 lb⋅ft)	6.6 s	422 km (262 mi)	373 km (232 mi)	11 kW	120 kW	2021–2024
Born 59 with E-Boost Pack	63 (59) kWh lithium-ion	RWD	APP 310	170 kW (231 PS; 228 hp)	310 N⋅m (229 lb⋅ft)	6.7 s	428 km (266 mi)	365 km (227 mi)	11 kW	165 kW	2024–present
Born 77	82 (77) kWh lithium-ion	RWD	APP 310	170 kW (231 PS; 228 hp)	310 N⋅m (229 lb⋅ft)	7.0 s	551 km (342 mi)	495 km (308 mi)	11 kW	170 kW	2021–2024
Born 77 with E-Boost Pack	82 (77) kWh lithium-ion	RWD	APP 310	170 kW (231 PS; 228 hp)	310 N⋅m (229 lb⋅ft)	7.1 s	560 km (348 mi)	487 km (303 mi)	11 kW	175 kW	2024–present
Born VZ	84 (79) kWh lithium-ion	RWD	APP 550	240 kW (326 PS; 322 hp)	545 N⋅m (402 lb⋅ft)	5.6 s	599 km (372 mi)	508 km (316 mi)	11 kW	185 kW	2024–present

== Safety ==
=== ANCAP ===
ANCAP test results Cupra Born (2022, aligned with Euro NCAP)
Test	Points	%
Overall:	5 /5 stars	
Adult occupant:	35.47	93%
Child occupant:	43.89	89%
Pedestrian:	39.91	73%
Safety assist:	12.83	80%

=== Euro NCAP ===
Euro NCAP test results Cupra Born 170 kW e-Boost Pack (LHD) (2022)
Test	Points	%
Overall:	5 /5 stars	
Adult occupant:	35.5	93%
Child occupant:	44	89%
Pedestrian:	39.9	73%
Safety assist:	12.8	80%

Euro NCAP test results Cupra Born 170kW 59kWh e-Boost Pack (LHD) (2025)
Test	Points	%
Overall:	5 /5 stars	
Adult occupant:	36.0	89%
Child occupant:	43.0	87%
Pedestrian:	48.0	76%
Safety assist:	13.8	76%

== Production ==
Calendar year	Total production
2021	4,801
2022	36,153
2023	45,300
2024	42,593
2025	43,503
