= Volkswagen ID.3 =

Battery electric compact hatchback

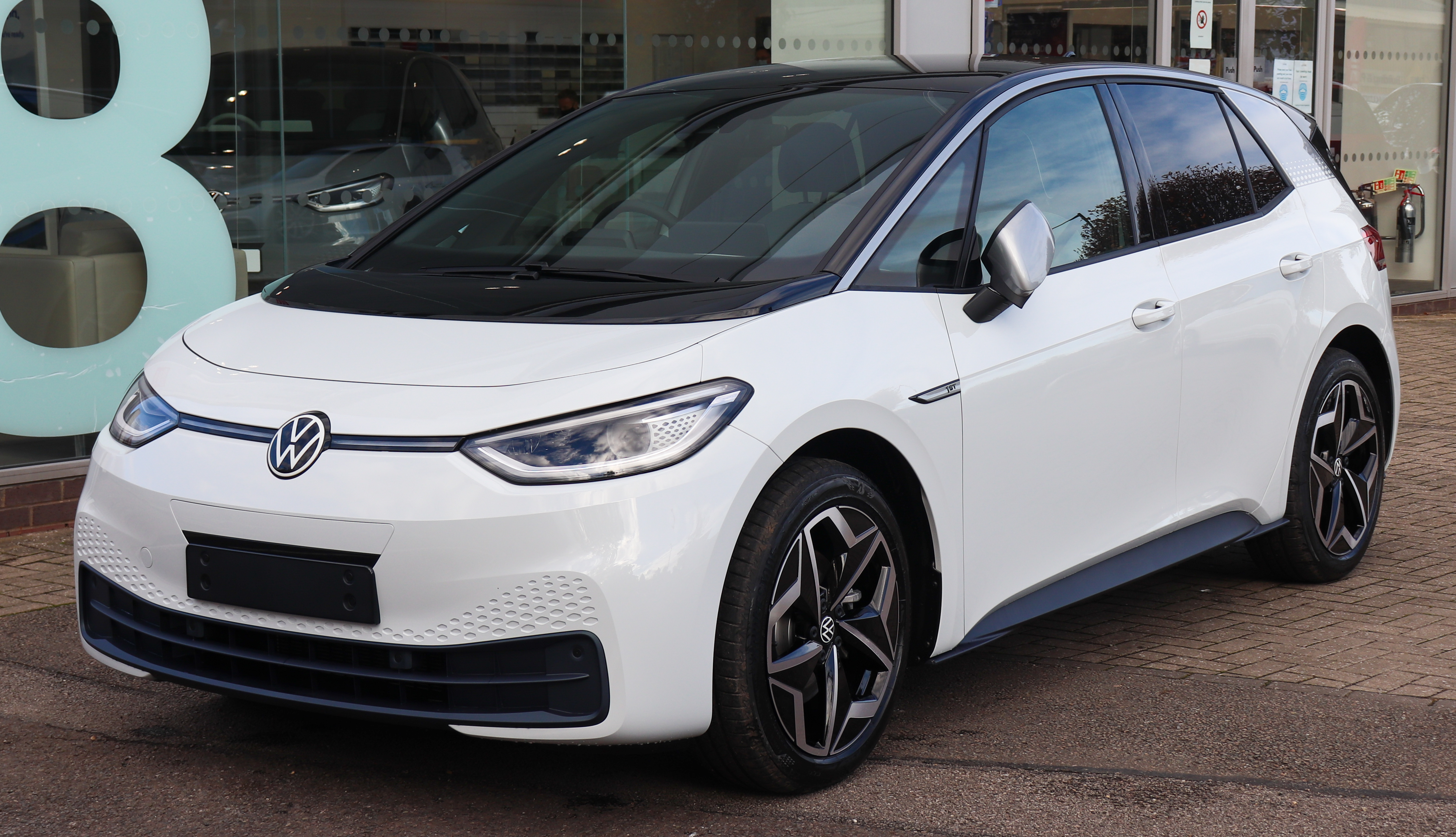
- Volkswagen ID.3 1st

Overview
- Manufacturer: Volkswagen
- Model code: E11; E12
- Also called: Volkswagen ID.3 Neo (second facelift)
- Production: November 2019 – present
- Assembly: Germany: Zwickau (Zwickau-Mosel Plant); Dresden (Transparent Factory, until December 2025); China: Anting (SAIC-VW)
- Designer: Klaus Bischoff, Marco Antonio Pavone, Felipe Montoya Bueloni and Ákos Száz

Body and chassis
- Class: Small family car (C)
- Body style: 5-door hatchback
- Layout: Rear-motor, rear-wheel drive
- Platform: Volkswagen Group MEB
- Related: Cupra Born; Volkswagen ID.4/ID.5

Powertrain
- Electric motor: APP 310 permanent magnet brushless motor APP 550 permanent magnet brushless motor (GTX only)
- Transmission: Single-speed
- Battery: 52.8 kWh CATL/UABS NMC lithium-ion (China, 2023–2025); 53.6 kWh UABS LFP (China, 2025–present); 57.3 kWh CATL NMC lithium-ion (China, 2021–2023); 55 kWh NMC lithium-ion (Pure); 62 kWh NMC lithium-ion (Pro); 82 kWh NMC lithium-ion (Pro S); 84 kWh NMC lithium-ion (GTX)
- Electric range: WLTP: 45 kWh: up to 330 km (205 mi); 58 kWh: up to 420 km (260 mi); 77 kWh: up to 550 km (340 mi); 84 kWh: up to 670 km (415 mi)
- Plug-in charging: DC 125 kW via CCS Combo 2; 3-phase AC 11 kW via Type 2; 1-phase AC 7.2 kW via Type 2; V2H (2024 – present)

Dimensions
- Wheelbase: 2,770 mm (109 in)
- Length: 4,262 mm (167.8 in)
- Width: 1,809 mm (71.2 in)
- Height: 1,552 mm (61.1 in)
- Kerb weight: 1,772–1,935 kg (3,907–4,266 lb)

Chronology
- Predecessor: Volkswagen e-Golf

The Volkswagen ID.3 is a battery electric small family car (C-segment) produced by Volkswagen since 2019. It is the first passenger vehicle of Volkswagen Group to utilise the MEB platform, and the first in what would become the long-running ID. series. It was unveiled on 9 September 2019 at the Frankfurt Motor Show, after being first shown as the I.D. concept car at the 2016 Paris Motor Show. Deliveries to retail customers began in Germany in September 2020.

== Overview ==
=== I.D. Concept ===
The ID.3 was previewed as a concept car called the Volkswagen I.D., first shown at the 2016 Paris Motor Show. It was the first concept model of the new all-electric I.D. sub-brand. According to Volkswagen, the I.D. featured innovations such as virtual wing mirrors (using video cameras), "chocolate bar" battery design, and retractable LiDAR sensors used for autonomous driving, not all of which made it to the production version.

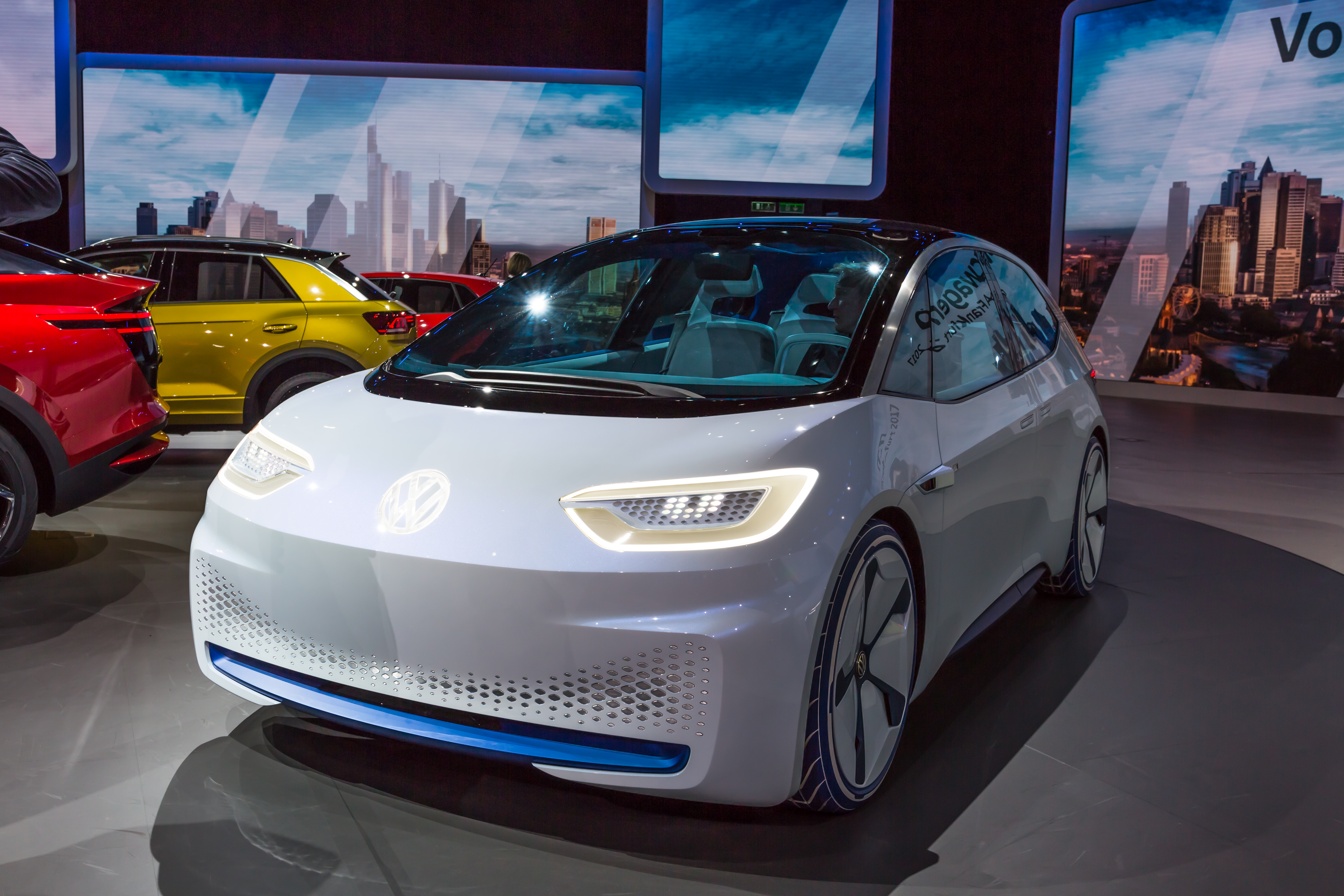
Volkswagen I.D. Concept at IAA 2017

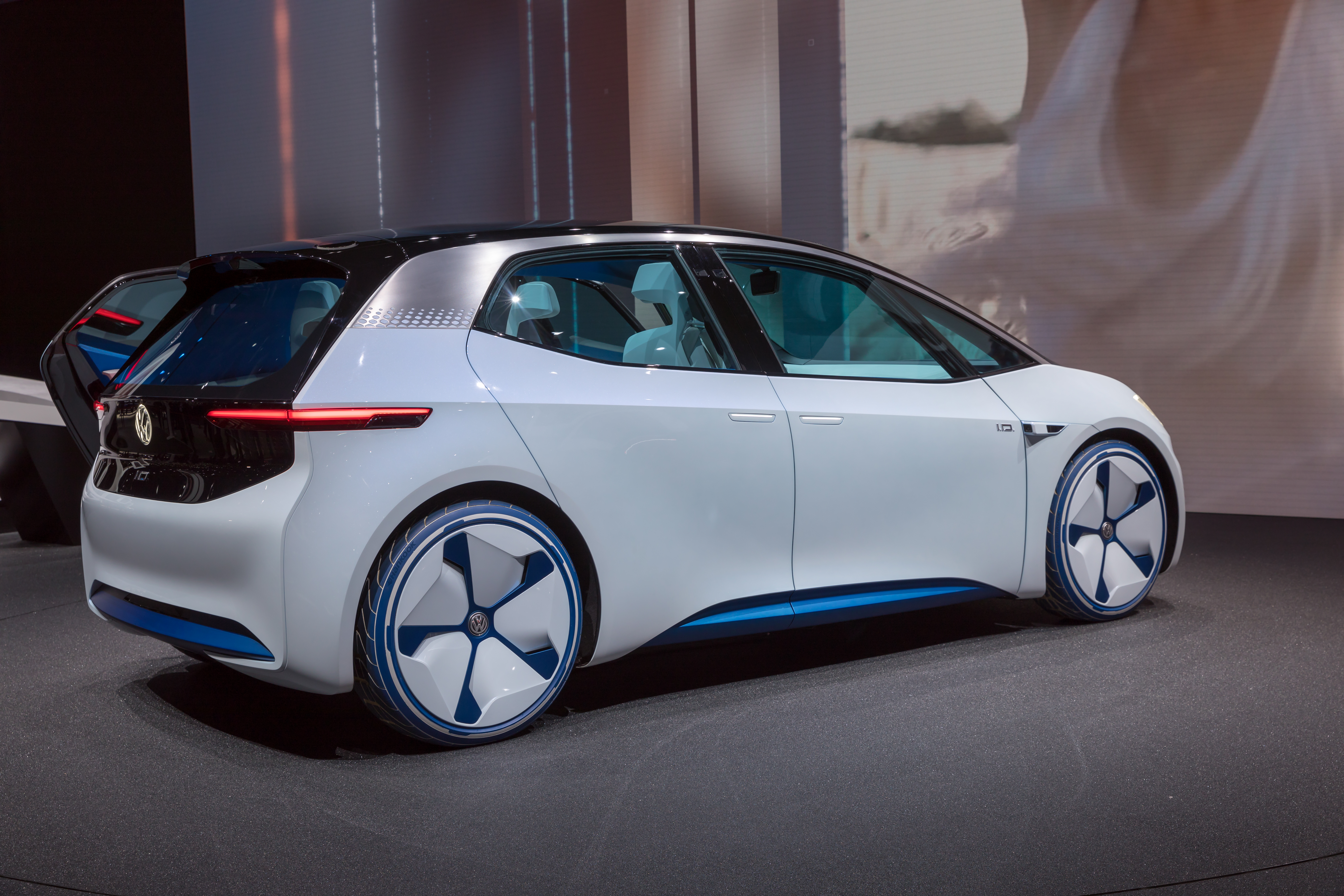
Volkswagen I.D. Concept at Geneva Motor Show 2018

=== Production model ===
In May 2019, Volkswagen confirmed the production model based on this prototype was named Volkswagen ID.3, instead of the rumoured I.D. Neo name, and officially presented at the International Motor Show Germany in September 2019. The ID.3 is one of five new Volkswagen models based on the MEB platform. Smaller cars bearing the ID.1 and ID.2 names are expected, and bigger models will range from ID.4 to ID.9. Volkswagen has also applied for trademark protection of an additional "X", supposedly for a SUV. Reservations for the launch model of the ID.3 started on the 8 May 2019, which were set to be delivered in midyear 2020, whereas the base model was delivered in 2021. Volkswagen named high expected demand as a reason. It received 10,000 buyer reservations within 24 hours after pre-orders opened and 30,000 before the unveiling at IAA 2019. Retail deliveries began in Germany in September 2020.

The production version of the ID.3 was unveiled on 9 September 2019 at the Frankfurt Motor Show (IAA), along with the new Volkswagen logo and branding. The cars are assembled at Volkswagen's Zwickau factory, where the company expects the full plant capacity (330,000 cars per year) to produce electric cars based on the MEB platform for the Volkswagen Group from 2021 onwards. In 2021, an additional ID.3 production line was started at the Transparent Factory in Dresden.

In 2021, Volkswagen stated they were considering a convertible version, releasing 2 design illustrations.

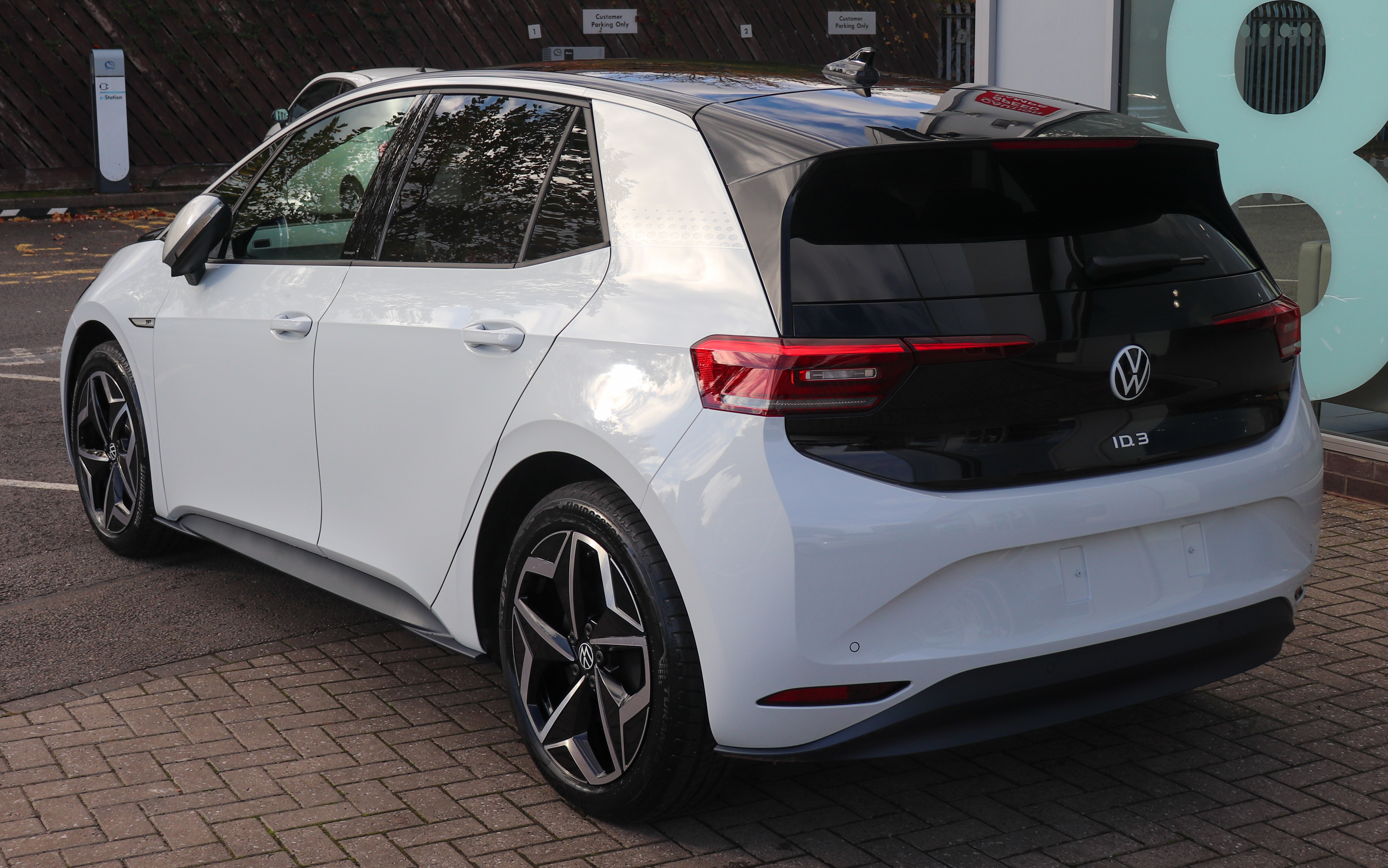
Volkswagen ID.3 1st (rear view)

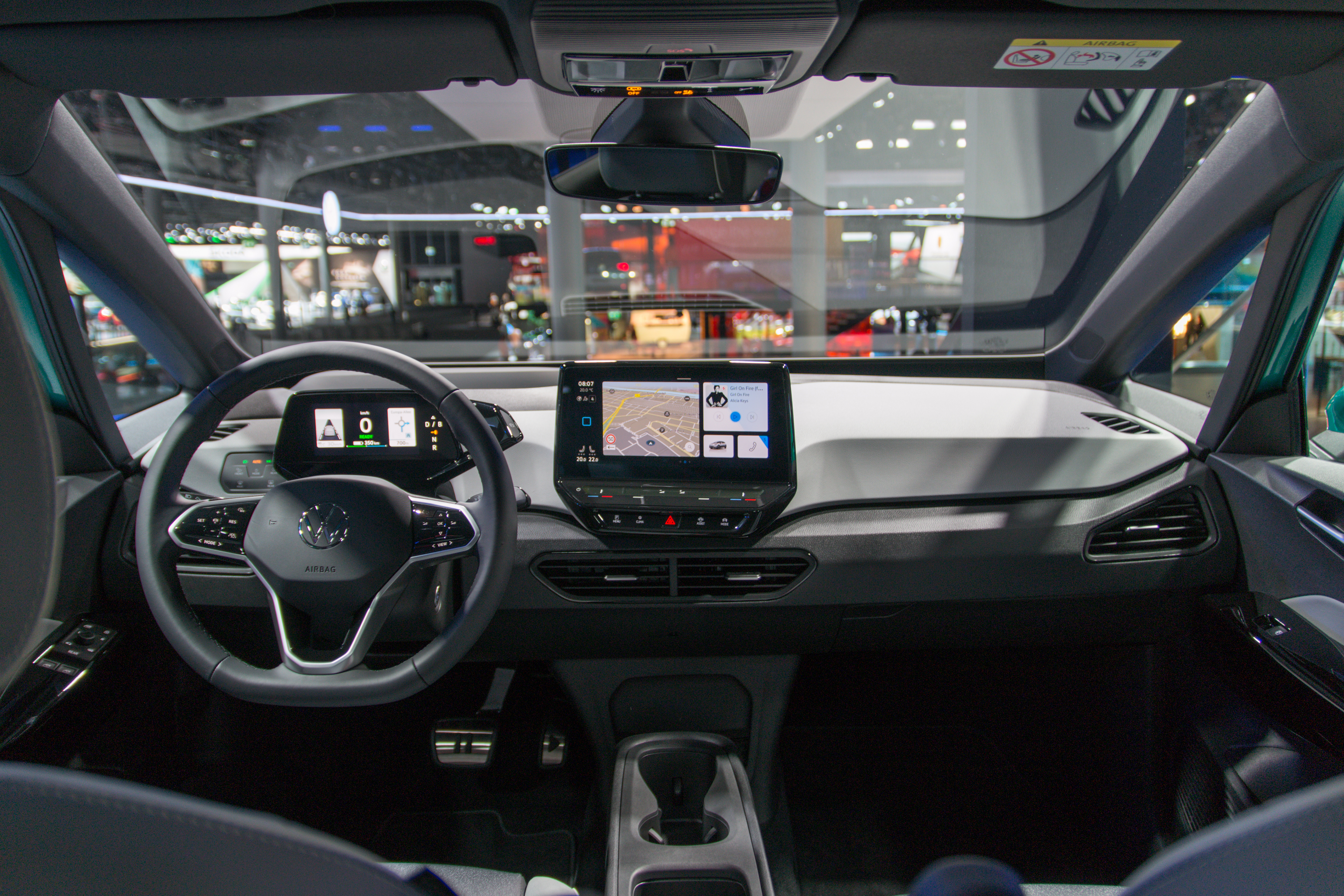
Interior

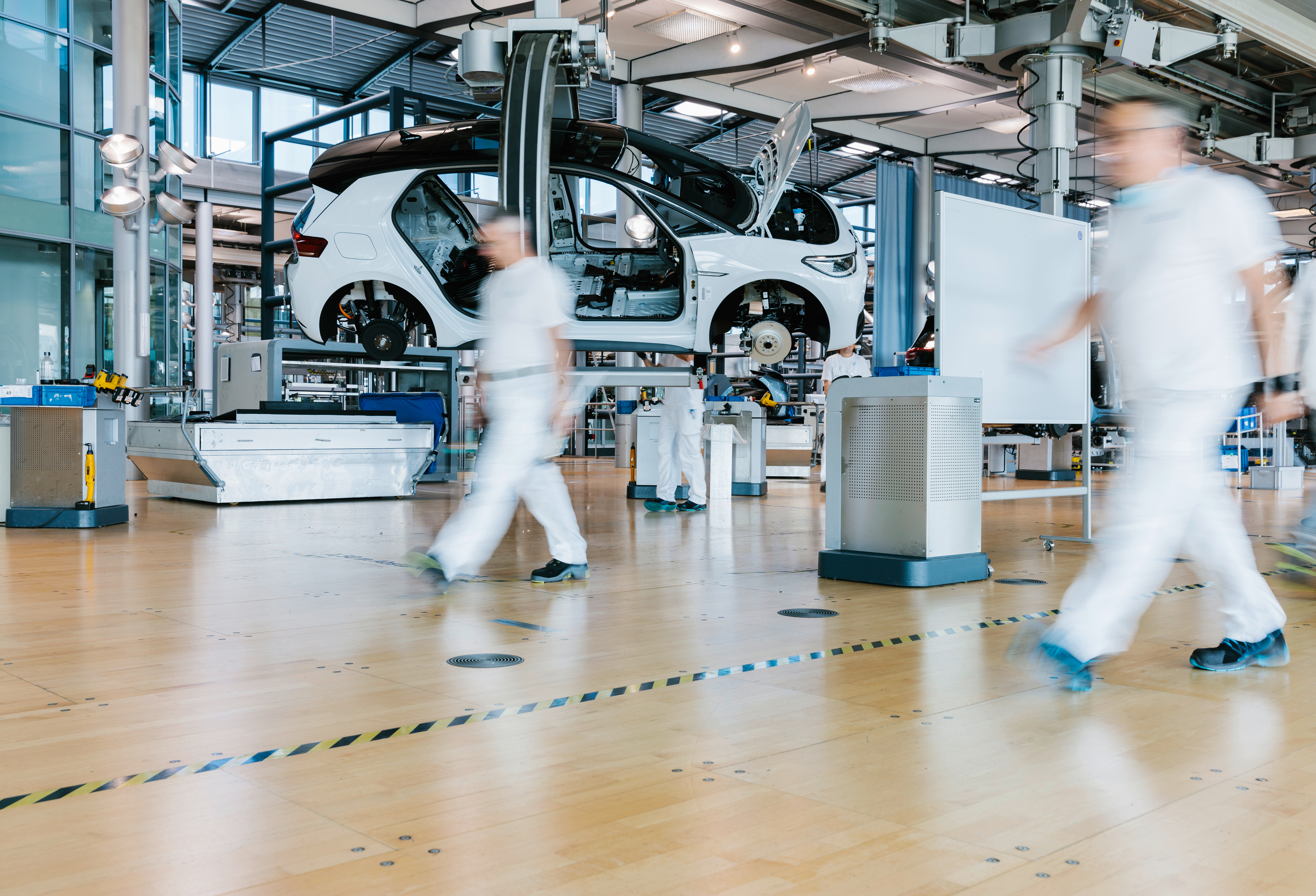
Transparent Factory production line, Dresden

==== 2023 facelift ====
In March 2023, Volkswagen released the refreshed version of the ID.3. The facelift features a slightly redesigned front bumper and air intakes, as well as improved interior material quality. The ID.3 was to be launched in Australasia alongside the ID.4, ID.5 and ID. Buzz in mid-2024.

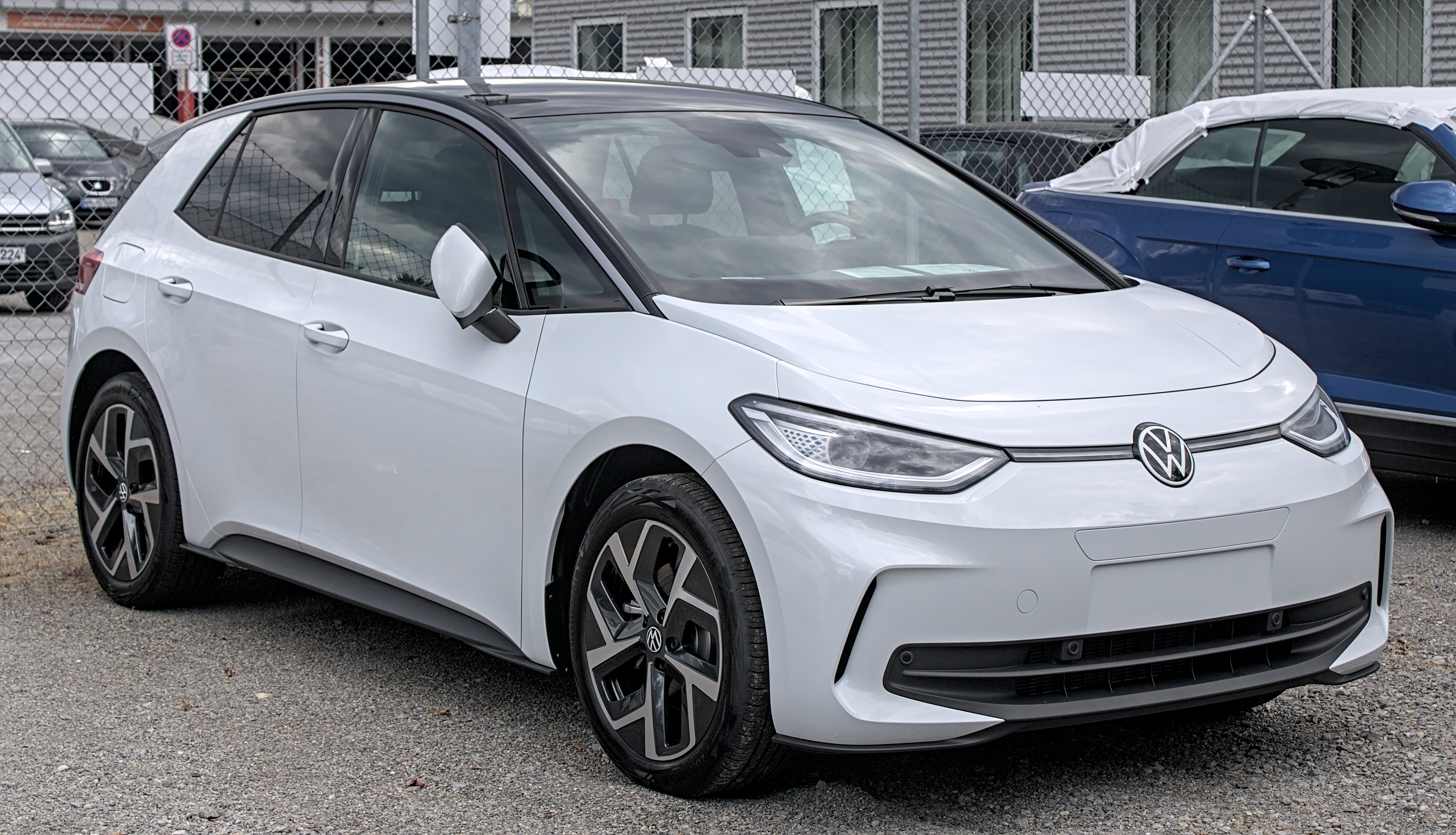
2023 Volkswagen ID.3

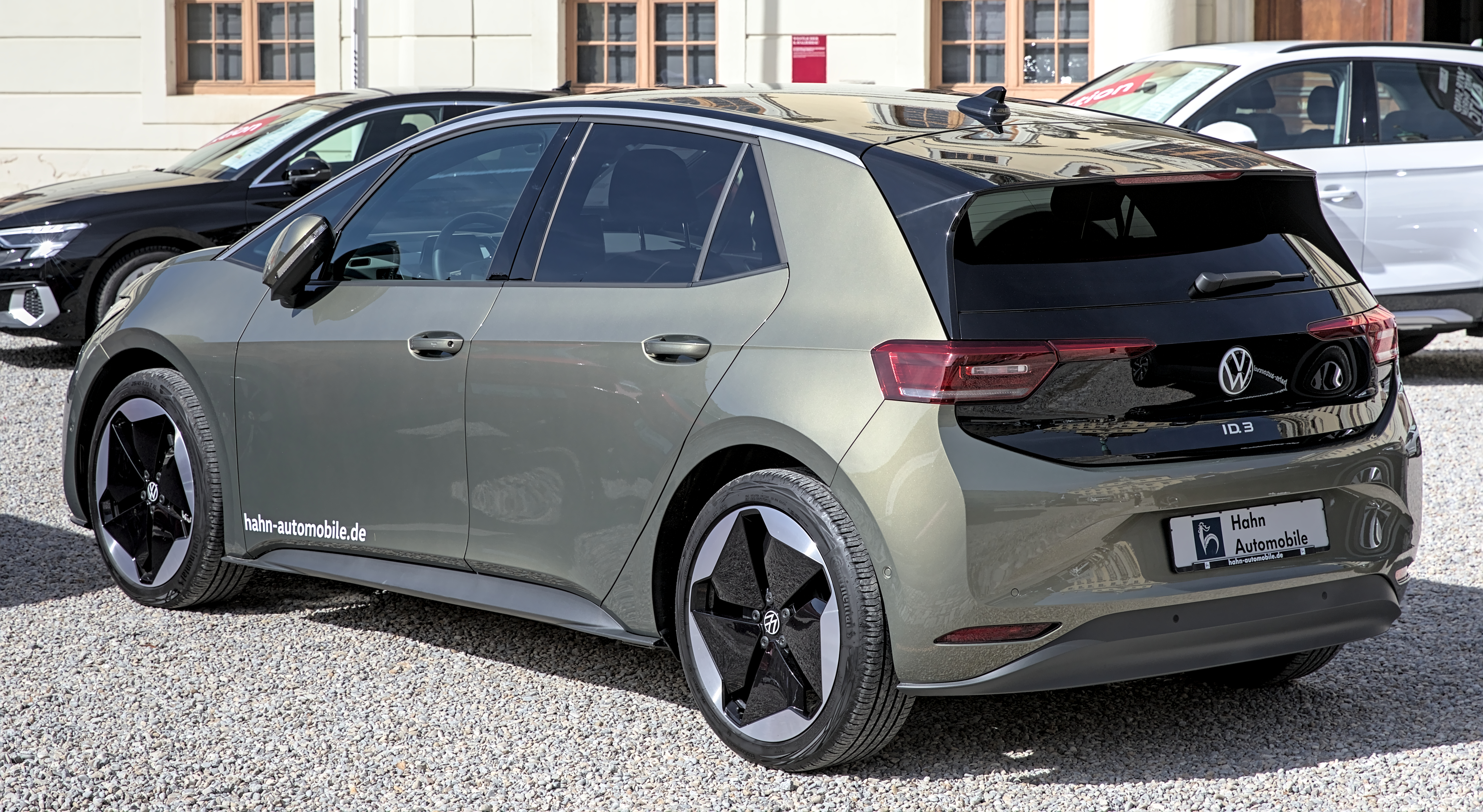
Rear view

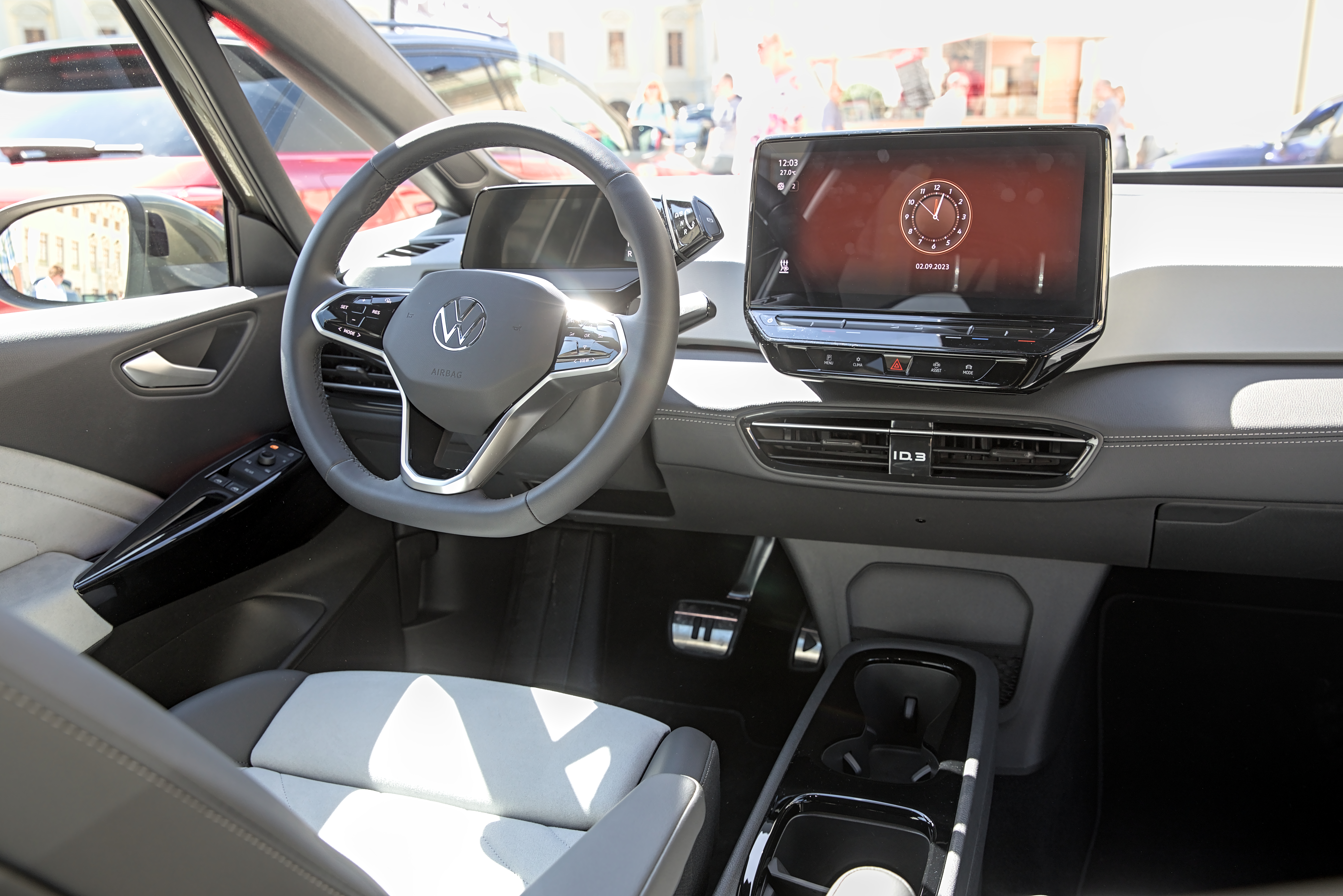
Interior

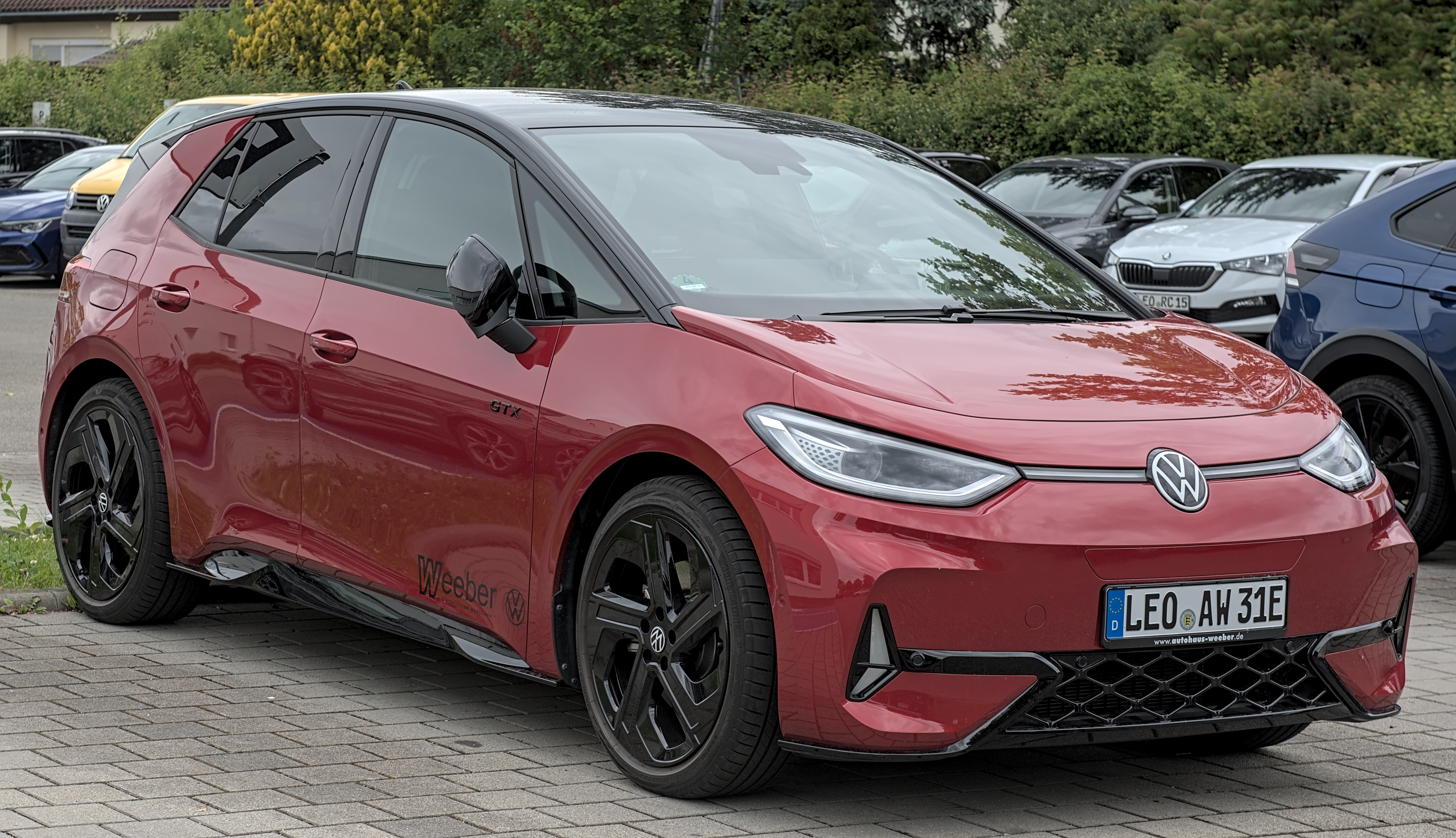
Volkswagen ID.3 GTX

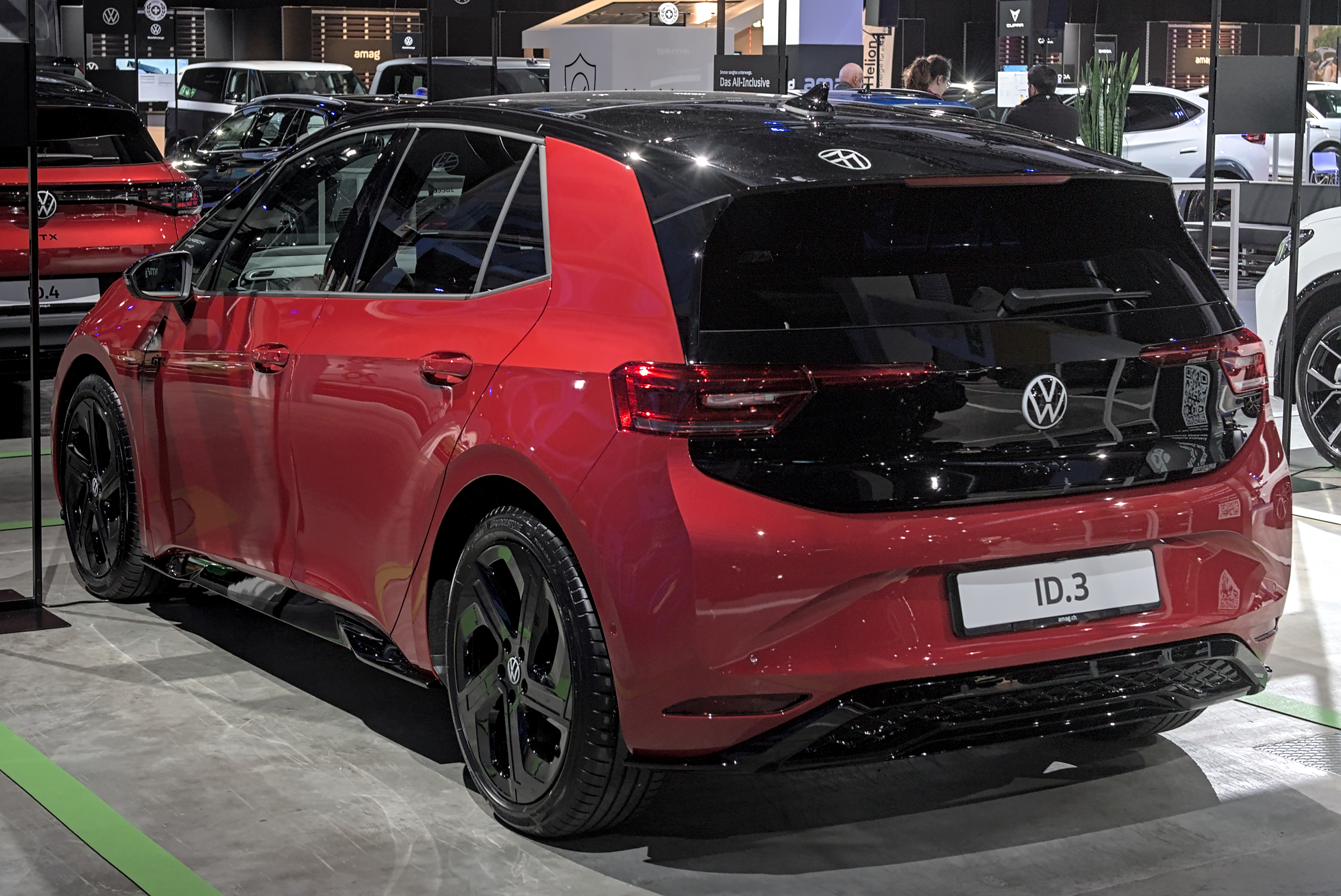
Rear view

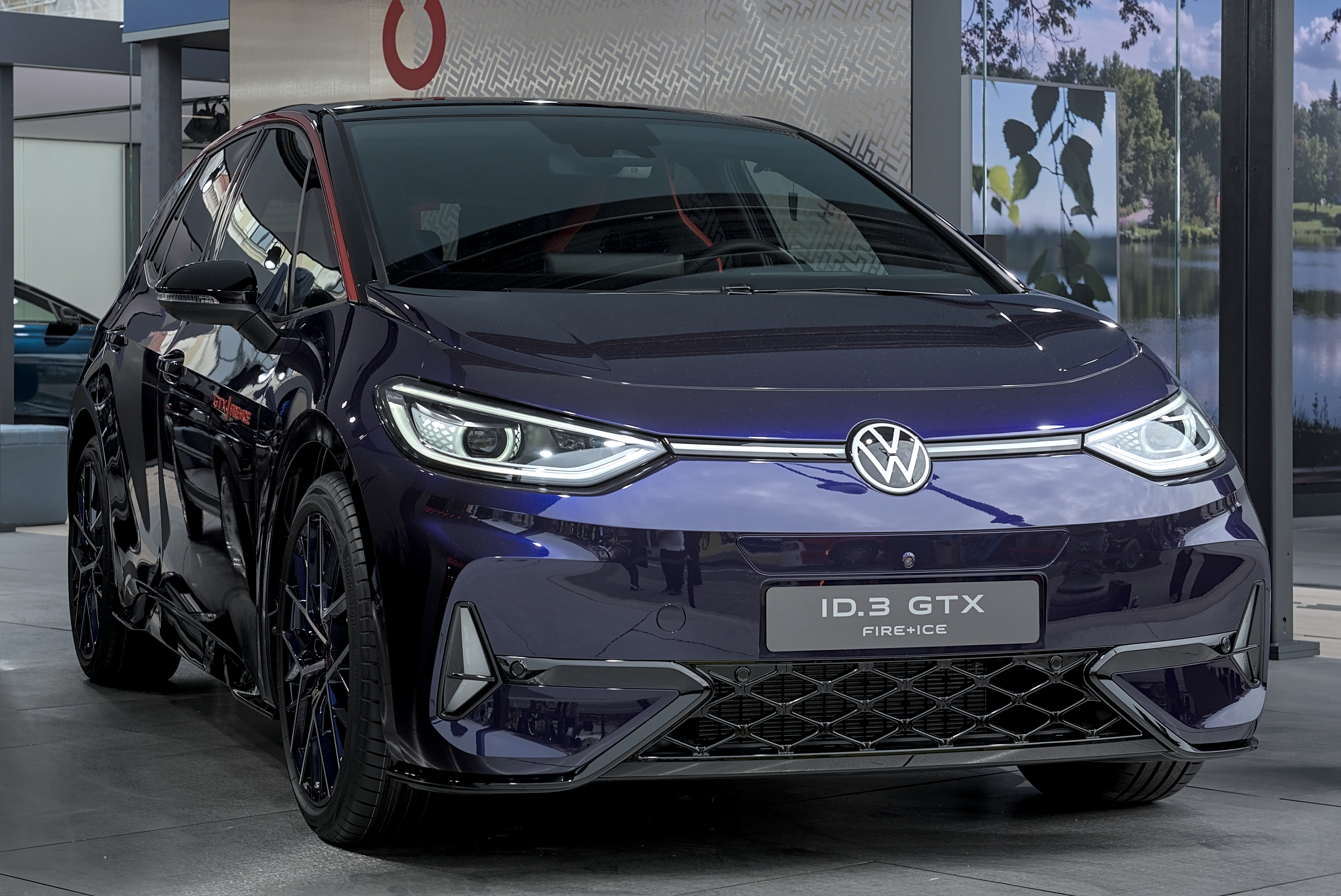
Volkswagen ID.3 GTX Fire+Ice

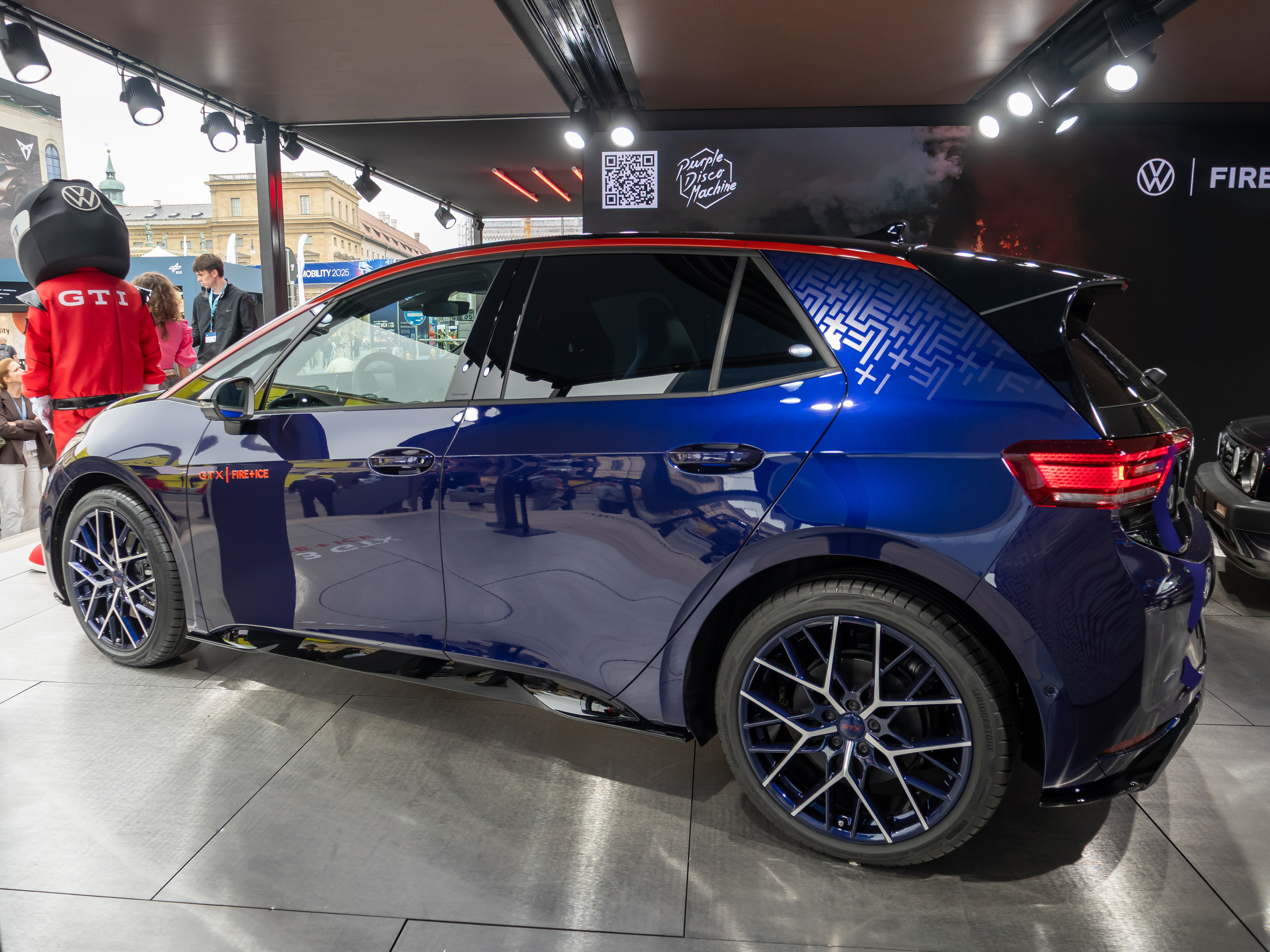
Rear view

==== 2026 facelift (ID.3 Neo) ====
In April 2026, Volkswagen presented a substantially revised version of the ID.3 under the new name ID.3 Neo. The update includes a revised exterior design; the front design featuring a light bar was adopted from the ID.Polo, while the black contrast roof and C-pillar graphic from its predecessor have been omitted. The interior was also fully overhauled, utilizing a redesigned steering wheel with a range of physical controls, and a revised display setup including a 12.9-inch central display and 10.3-inch instrument cluster. Additionally, four window switches have been reintroduced, replacing the previous "rear" button. Furthermore, the facelift also features an updated electric drive system with increased power outputs, and an expanded range of driver assistance and infotainment technologies.

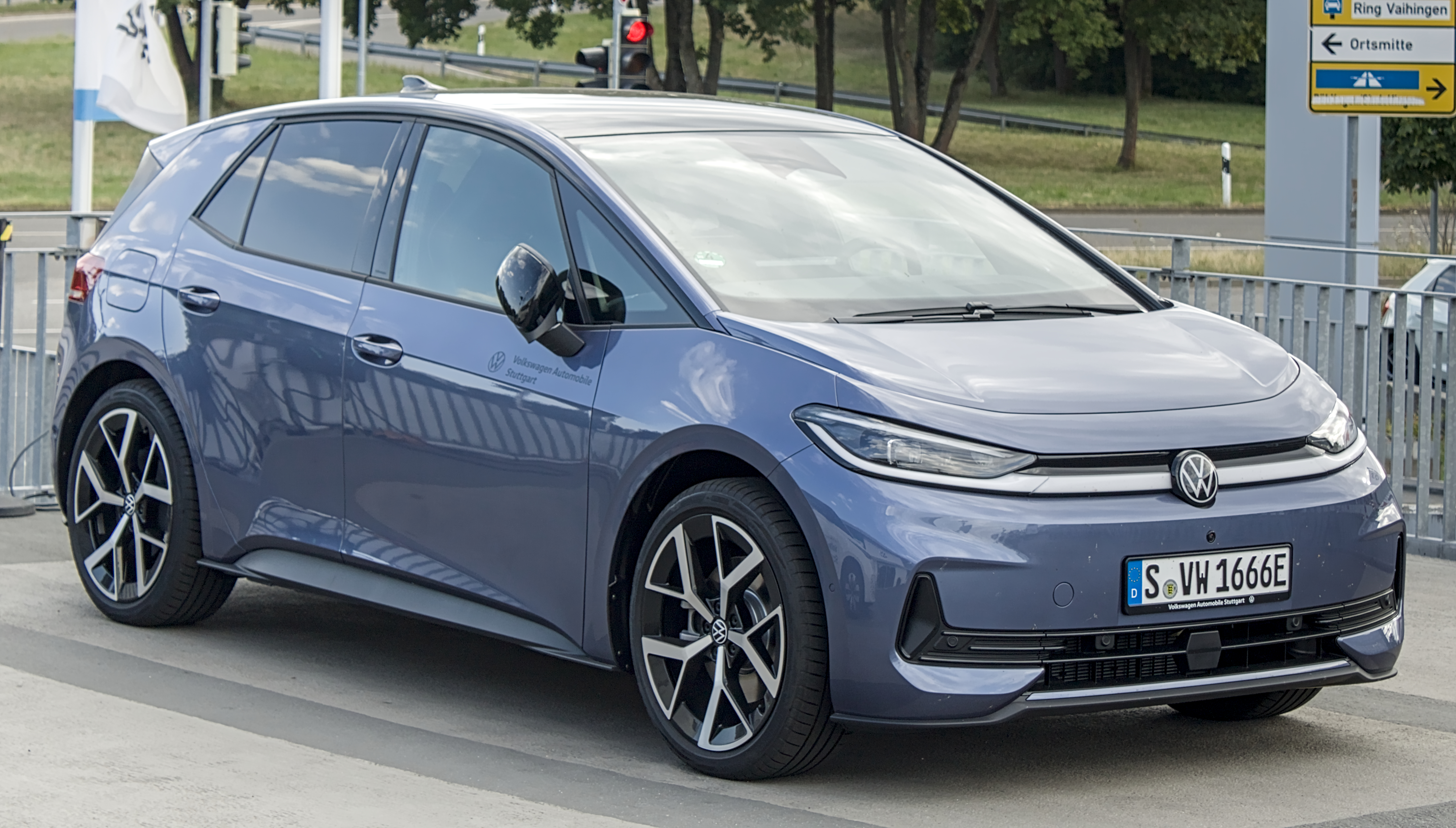
2026 Volkswagen ID.3 Neo

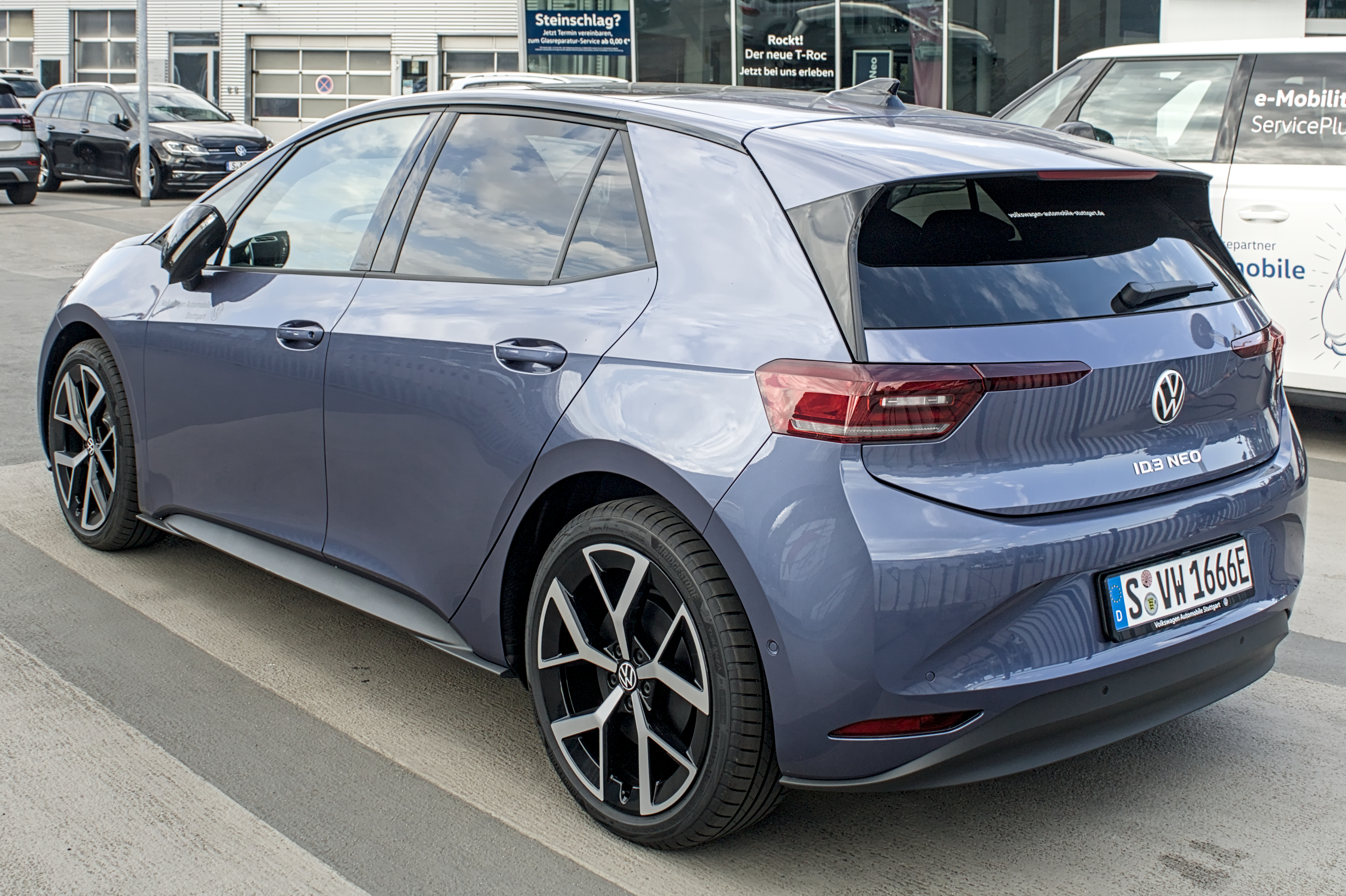
Rear view

=== Volkswagen ID.3 GTI ===
ID.3 GTI

The Volkswagen ID.3 GTI is an upcoming all-electric hot hatch that uses a rear-mounted motor producing 240 kW (326 PS) and 545 N⋅m (402 lb⋅ft), enabling acceleration from 0 to 100 km/h in 5.6 seconds and an electronically limited top speed of 200 km/h.

=== Specifications ===
At launch, the European-market ID.3 was available with a choice of two models: "ID.3 Pro Performance" and "ID.3 Pro S". Both the Pro Performance and the Pro S shared the same APP 310 traction motor, which has an output of 150 kW (204 PS; 201 hp) and 310 N⋅m (229 ft⋅lb). The difference was in the storage capacity of the battery; the Pro Performance battery had a usable capacity of 58 kWh, while the Pro S battery was 77 kWh. A third model (tentatively named "ID.3 Pro") was planned to follow, with an output of 107 kW (145 PS; 143 hp). An entry-level model was released as the "ID.3 Pure Performance" in April 2021, which was equipped with a smaller battery of 45 kWh and slightly upgraded output of 150 PS (148 hp; 110 kW). A high-performance variant with the name ID.3 GTX and ID.3 GTX Performance have been announced to be released at the end of 2024, which will have an upgraded 79 kWh battery with an output of 201 kW (270 hp; 273 PS) and 240 kW (322 hp; 326 PS), respectively.

Three different battery choices are offered with the ID.3. The modules in the Pro Performance and Pro S are each 14 cm (5.5 in) high and 145 cm (57 in) wide. For the Pro Performance, the length is 144 cm (57 in), while the larger Pro S battery is 182 cm (72 in) long. The Pro S battery weighs 495 kg (1,091 lb). A liquid-cooled thermal management system is fitted to improve power output and service life, and VW guarantees the battery will retain 70% of its original capacity after an operating period of 8 years or 160,000 km (99,000 mi).

Charging rate for the Pro Performance and Pro S is limited to a maximum of 11 kW using the on-board AC charger; when a DC source is connected through the standard CCS inlet, maximum input power rises to 100 kW (Pro Performance) or 125 kW (Pro S). The charging rates for the basic model were planned to be limited to 7.2 kW (AC) and 50 kW (DC), with an option for 100 kW (DC). The MEB platform supports up to 125 kW charging. The 58 kWh version supports 120 kW DC charging.

Volkswagen ID.3
Model name		ID.3 Pure Performance	ID.3 Pro	ID.3 Pro Performance	ID.3 Pro S	ID.3 GTX	ID.3 GTX Performance
Availability		From 2021				From 2024	
Drivetrain		Rear motor, RWD					
Output	Power	110 kW (148 hp; 150 PS)	107 kW (143 hp; 145 PS)	150 kW (201 hp; 204 PS)		201 kW (270 hp; 273 PS)	240 kW (322 hp; 326 PS)
Output	Peak torque	310 N⋅m (229 lb⋅ft)				545 N⋅m (402 lb⋅ft)	
Battery capacity (Usable / Gross)		45 / 55 kWh	58 / 62 kWh		77 / 82 kWh	79 / 84 kWh	
Range	WLTP	348 km (216 mi)	425 km (264 mi)		548 km (341 mi)	600 km (370 mi)	
Range	Consumption (WLTP)	15.1–14.9 kWh/100 km (139–141 mpg‑e)	15.7–15.5 kWh/100 km (133–135 mpg‑e)	15.8–15.5 kWh/100 km (133–135 mpg‑e)	16.2 kWh/100 km (129 mpg‑e)	N/A	
Charging	Peak DC power	Up to 110 kW, 50 kW standard	Up to 120 kW		Up to 125 kW	Up to 175 kW	
Charging	AC power	7.2 kW	11 kW				
Charging	10-80% DC	42 / 31 min (50 kW / 100 kW)	35 minutes (120 kW)		30 minutes (170 kW)	26 minutes (175 kW)	
Charging	0-100% AC	450 min (7.2 kW)	375 min (11.0 kW)		450 min (11.0 kW)		
Performance	0–100 km/h (62 mph)	8.9 s	9.6 s	7.3 s	7.9 s	6.0 s	5.6 s
Performance	Top speed	160 km/h (99 mph)				180 km/h (112 mph)	200 km/h (124 mph)
Capacities	Kerb weight	1,772 kg (3,907 lb)	1,812 kg (3,995 lb)		1,928–1,935 kg (4,251–4,266 lb)	N/A	
Capacities	Number of seats	5			4 or 5	5	

The 77 kWh variants have four and five seat options; the others seat five. All but the 77 kWh variant will have an optional panoramic roof that can be combined with a bike rack on a support hook at the back. In 2024 an upgrade will increase the battery capacity for the Pro S to 79 kWh, have 5 seats and the optional panoramic roof and bike rack.

The drag coefficient of the car is 0.267, frontal area is 2.36 square metres, and the minimum turning circle is 10.2 metres (33 ft).

=== Trims ===
Volkswagen ID.3 trim availability (UK)
Trim / Model	Pure Performance	Pro	Pro Performance	Pro S
Life	Yes	Yes	Yes	No
Style	Yes	No	No	No
Family	No	Yes	Yes	No
Max	No	No	Yes	No
Tour	No	No	No	Yes

It was first available in three different launch trim levels, namely ID.3 1st, ID.3 1st Plus and ID.3 1st Max, all based on the Pro Performance model (58 kWh battery). The battery size and powertrain remain the same across all three trim levels; however, there are different levels of equipment, styling options and wheels. The wheels provided are: 18 in (460 mm) for ID.3 1st (215/55R18), 19 in (480 mm) for ID.3 1st Plus (215/50R19) and 20 in (510 mm) for ID.3 1st Max (215/45R20).

=== Software issues ===
In early 2020 it was announced that delivery of the ID.3 was going to be delayed until at least September 2020 due to software errors that VW had yet to be able to resolve. Some stripped-down cars were delivered in September with cloud-connected ones being delivered at the end of 2020.

=== Safety ===
Euro NCAP test results Volkswagen ID.3 'Pro' (LHD) (2020)
Test	Points	%
Overall:	5 /5 stars	
Adult occupant:	33.3	87%
Child occupant:	44	89%
Pedestrian:	38.8	71%
Safety assist:	14.2	88%

Euro NCAP test results Volkswagen ID.3 'Pro' (LHD) (2025)
Test	Points	%
Overall:	5 /5 stars	
Adult occupant:	34.6	86%
Child occupant:	43.0	87%
Pedestrian:	49.5	78%
Safety assist:	13.8	76%

=== Awards ===
- In January 2021, the ID.3 Pro Performance Life was named Small Electric Car of the Year by What Car? magazine. What Car? awarded the ID.3 five stars out of five in its review of the car.
- In 2021, it was named Best Electric Compact car in the Best Car Awards organized by the Belgian automotive magazines Le Moniteur Automobile and AutoGids."Best Car Awards 2021: Electric Compact". Le Moniteur Automobile (in French).

== Sales ==
Almost 57,000 units were delivered in 2020, ranking among the world's top-ten best-selling plug-in cars in just four months on the market.

Year	Global (production)	Europe	China
2020	64,259	54,495	
2021	73,738	72,723	6,737
2022	83,432	60,086	16,514
2023	142,216		75,414
2024	149,100		92,928
2025	117,700		38,801

== See also ==
- Volkswagen ID. series
- List of Volkswagen vehicles
