= Volkswagen ID.4 =

Battery electric compact crossover SUV

Volkswagen ID.4/ID.5
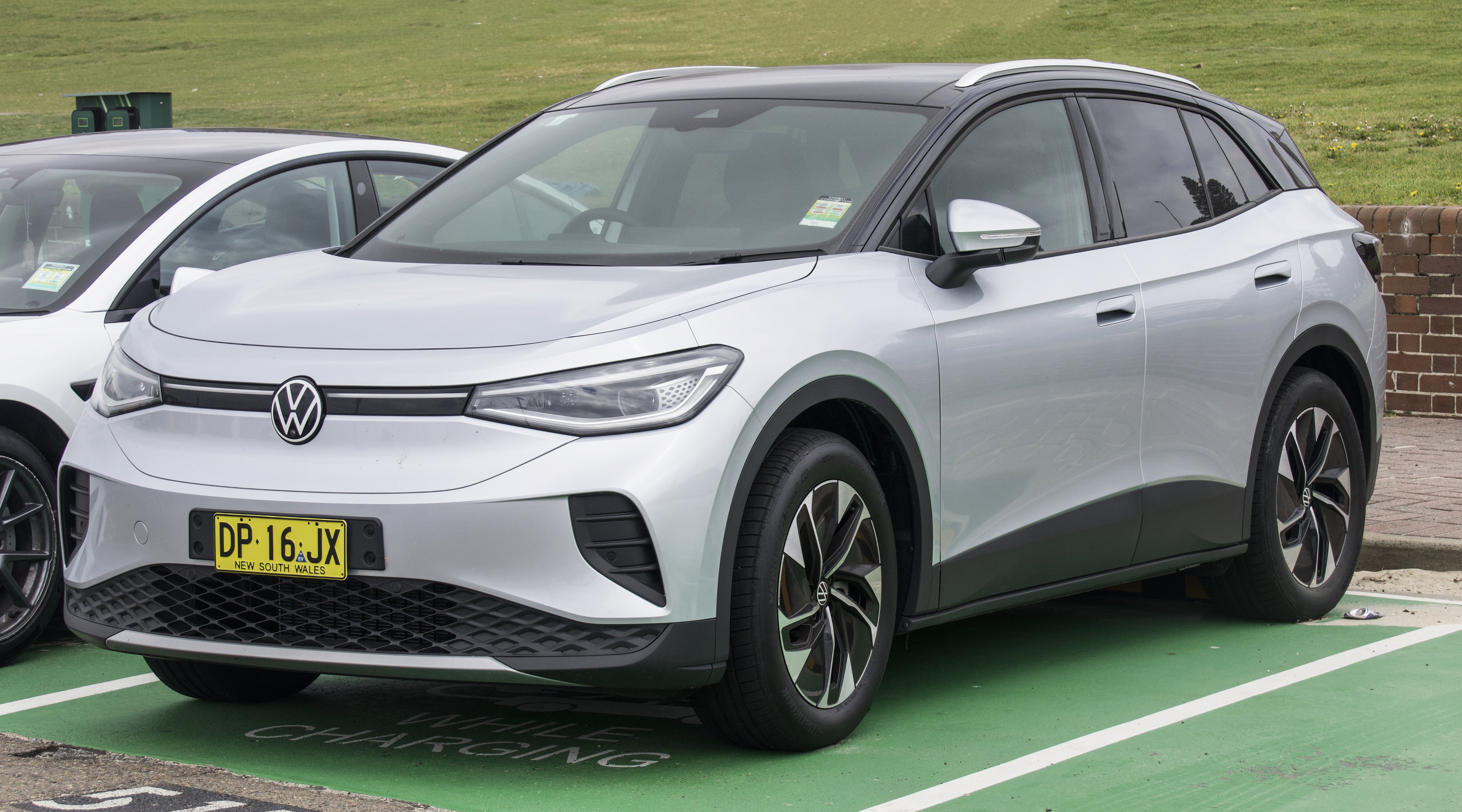
- 2025 Volkswagen ID.4 Pro

Overview
- Manufacturer: Volkswagen
- Model code: E21 (ID.4); E39 (ID.5)
- Production: 2020–2026
- Model years: 2021–2026
- Assembly: Germany: Zwickau (Zwickau-Mosel Plant); Emden; United States: Chattanooga, Tennessee (Chattanooga Assembly Plant, 2022-2026); China: Anting (SAIC-VW, ID.4 X); Foshan (FAW-VW, ID.4 Crozz)
- Designer: Klaus Bischoff and Felipe Montoya Bueloni

Body and chassis
- Class: Compact crossover SUV (C)
- Body style: 5-door SUV (ID.4); 5-door coupe SUV (ID.5)
- Layout: Rear-motor, rear-wheel-drive Dual-motor, all-wheel-drive
- Platform: Volkswagen Group MEB
- Related: Volkswagen ID. Aura T6; Volkswagen ID.3; Volkswagen ID. Buzz; Volkswagen ID.6; Škoda Enyaq; Audi Q4 e-tron; Cupra Tavascan; Ford Explorer EV; Ford Capri EV

Powertrain
- Electric motor: APP 310/APP 550 permanent magnet brushless motor
- Power output: 146–335 hp (148–340 PS; 109–250 kW)
- Battery: Lithium-ion; 52–77 kWh (usable); 55–82 kWh (total)
- Electric range: 77-82 kWh, since 2024: 263–291 mi (423–468 km) (EPA); 512–572 km (318–355 mi) (WLTP); 77-82 kWh, before 2024: 240–275 mi (386–443 km) (EPA); 506–519 km (314–322 mi) (WLTP); 55-62 kWh: 206–209 mi (332–336 km) (EPA); 341–364 km (212–226 mi) (WLTP)
- Plug-in charging: AC: Three-phase (Europe); One-phase (North America); 7.2 kW (55kWh); 11 kW (62-82kWh); DC: 50–145 kW (55kWh); 135 kW (“Gen 1” 82kWh); 140 kW (62kWh); 175 kW (“Gen 2” 82kWh)

Dimensions
- Wheelbase: 2,765 mm (108.9 in)
- Length: 4,584 mm (180.5 in) (ID.4); 4,600 mm (181.1 in) (ID.5)
- Width: 1,852 mm (72.9 in)
- Height: 1,636 mm (64.4 in) (ID.4); 1,613 mm (63.5 in) (ID.5)
- Kerb weight: 1,891–2,224 kg (4,169–4,903 lb)

Chronology
- Successor: Volkswagen ID. Tiguan (Europe); Volkswagen ID. Aura T6 (China)

The Volkswagen ID.4 and Volkswagen ID.5 are battery electric compact crossover SUVs produced by Volkswagen from 2020 to 2026. Based on the MEB platform, the ID.4 is the second model of the Volkswagen ID. series after the ID.3.

The production version of the ID.4 debuted in late 2020 as the first fully-electric crossover SUV under the Volkswagen brand, while the coupe-shaped variant of the ID.4 (akin to the Audi Q8 Sportback e-tron) is marketed as the Volkswagen ID.5 and was presented in November 2021.

The ID.4 is positioned by Volkswagen as a high-volume, mass-market electric vehicle — a car for "the millions, not the millionaires," as the company claimed in its advertising. It was delivered to European customers from late 2020, and the first quarter of 2021 for the North American market.

The ID.4 was elected World Car of the Year 2021 over runner-ups Honda e and Toyota Yaris.

The vehicle was updated for model year 2024 to include a more powerful and efficient APP 550 electric motor with increased range, as well as heavily revised software and infotainment hardware.

== Overview ==
The ID.4 was previewed by the I.D. Crozz and I.D. Crozz II concept cars, which debuted in 2017 at the Shanghai and Frankfurt Auto Show, respectively. A prototype version of the ID.4 appeared in camouflage at the 2019 Frankfurt Motor Show discreetly so as not to steal the show from the first electric mass-market vehicle of the German brand, the ID.3.

The production version was presented globally on 23 September 2020. Unlike the ID.3 which is oriented mainly for the European market, the ID.4 also targeted the North American region as one of its core markets. Volkswagen Group of America CEO Scott Keogh went as far as saying the ID.4 "drives like a GTI, it has the packaging of a Tiguan and the purpose of the Beetle," to emphasise its driving dynamics, design, and technology.

At launch, the electric SUV was solely offered with rear-wheel-drive and an electric motor located at the rear axle, with the dual motor all-wheel-drive version to follow later. First sales were for the ID.4 "1st edition", which differs in some interior and exterior features from the series production models.

Headlights and taillights are mostly LED lamps on the ID.4, with Matrix LED lights being an optional feature in some regions. The front features a low-positioned air inlet behind which the radiator and parts of the air conditioning system are located. Short overhangs and a wheelbase of 2,766 mm (108.9 in) add up to a length of 4,584 mm (180.5 in). Wheels are offered in 18–21 inch sizes. RWD models can tow a maximum of 1,000 kg (2,200 lb) on a braked trailer with an optional tow bar and feature roof rails as standard.

With a 5.3 inch driver display and a 10-inch infotainment screen as well as Apple Carplay and Android Auto as standard equipment, the ID.4 features an optional augmented reality head-up display (HUD) as well as an optional 12" infotainment screen. The design includes a light strip below the windscreen providing visual cues related to certain functions such as the state of charge (SOC) when charging or brake alerts, which VW calls "ID. Light". Safety features include VW's Car2X communication system.

An optional heat pump extending range under low temperature conditions is offered or fitted as standard equipment in certain markets such as Canada and uses a R744 (CO_{2}) refrigerant. VW claims the heat pump can warm the cabin 2-3 times more efficiently than a resistance heater.

The boot offers 543 L of volume and 1,575 L when the rear seats are folded. The vehicle does not offer a storage compartment at the front end ("frunk"). The ID. 4 were to be launched in Australasia along with the ID.3, ID.5 and ID. Buzz in Mid-2024. The launches of the ID.4 and ID.5 in Australia were delayed past the original date.

For the 2024 model year, the ID.4/5 receives an update including a larger 12.9 inch infotainment display with new software, 82 kWh models also get an upgraded APP 550 motor, providing improved power and efficiency at the same time.

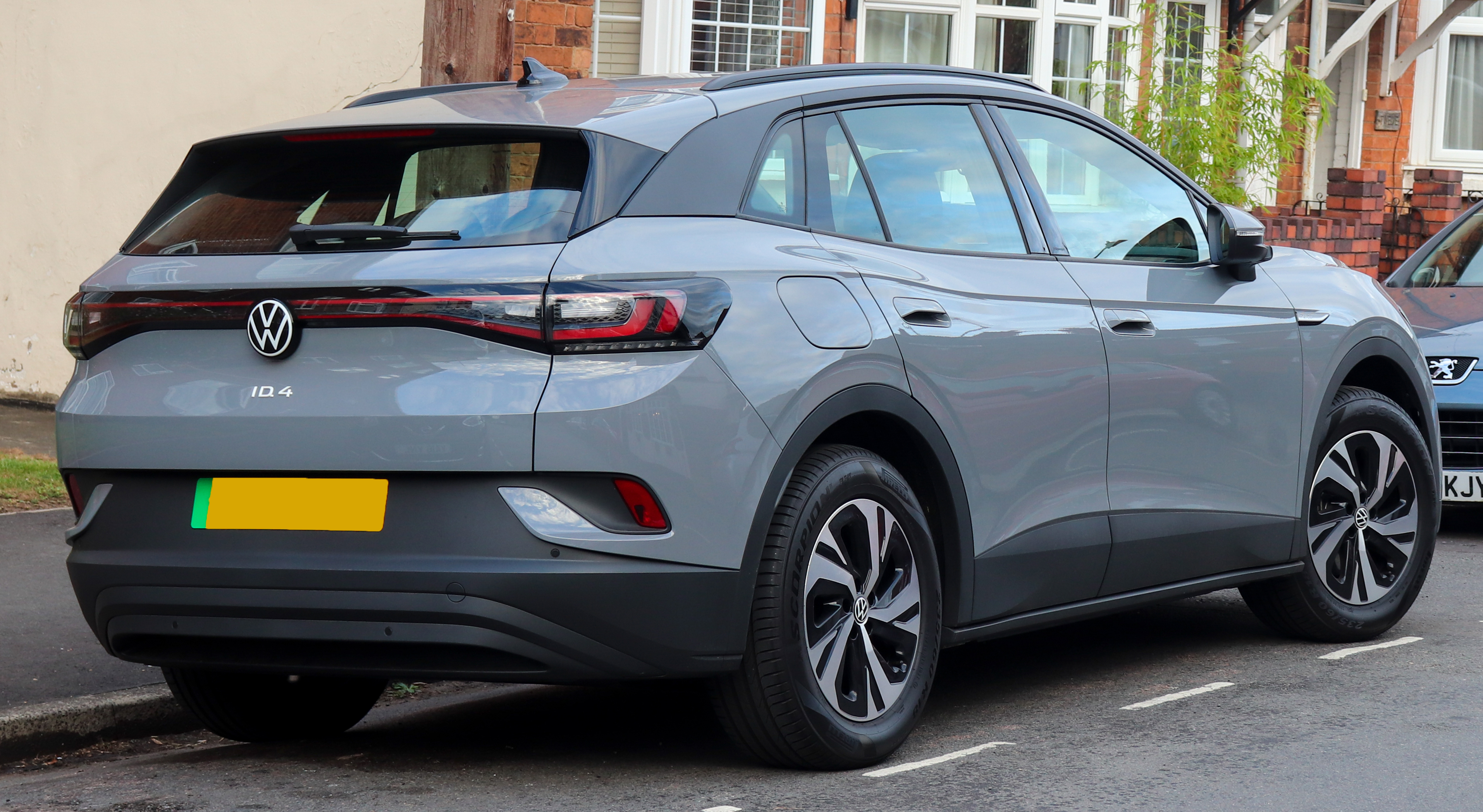
Rear view

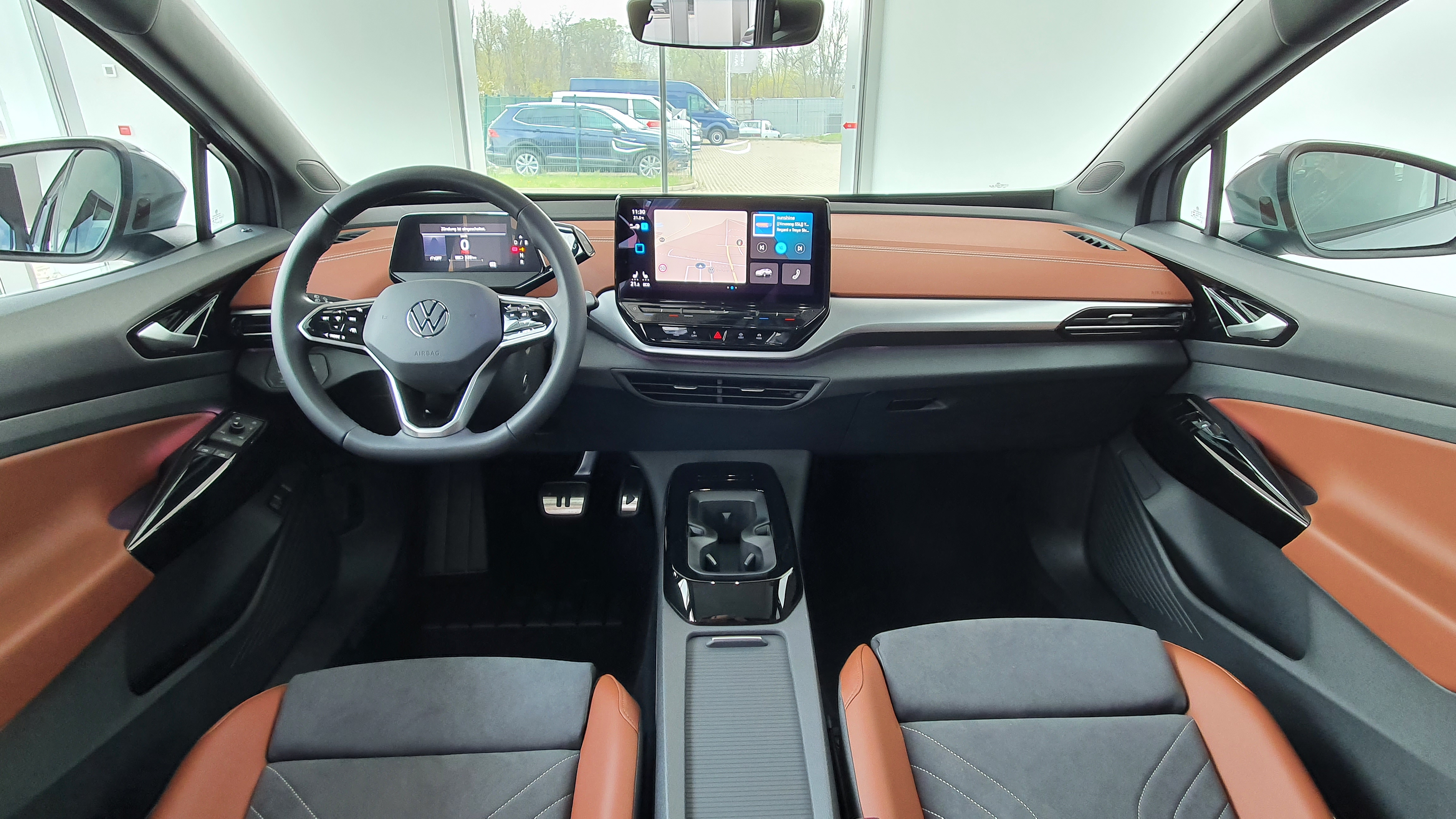
Interior

=== Volkswagen ID.5 ===
The Volkswagen ID.5 was previewed in August 2021, revealed in November 2021, and produced since January 2022. It features a lower 0.26 drag coefficient, which is 0.02 lower than the ID.4. The model is available in three variants, which are Pro, Pro Performance and GTX, with the latter using a dual motor all-wheel-drive layout. Three powertrain options are available, although unlike the ID.4, the ID.5 comes with just one battery capacity, which is 77 kWh. The ID.5's sloping roofline decreases the cargo space, which offers 549 L with the rear seats up and 1,561 L with the seats folded.

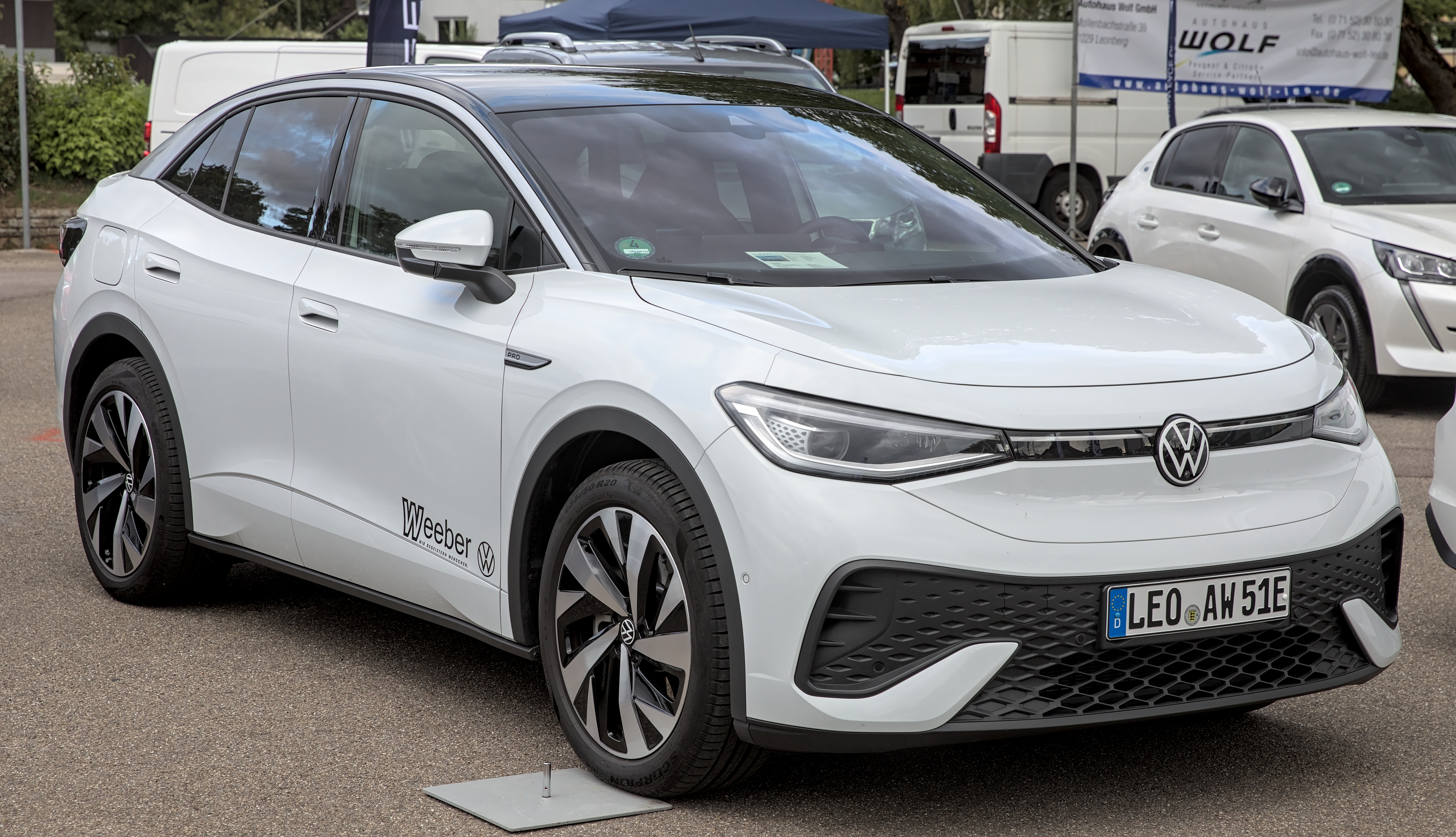
Volkswagen ID.5

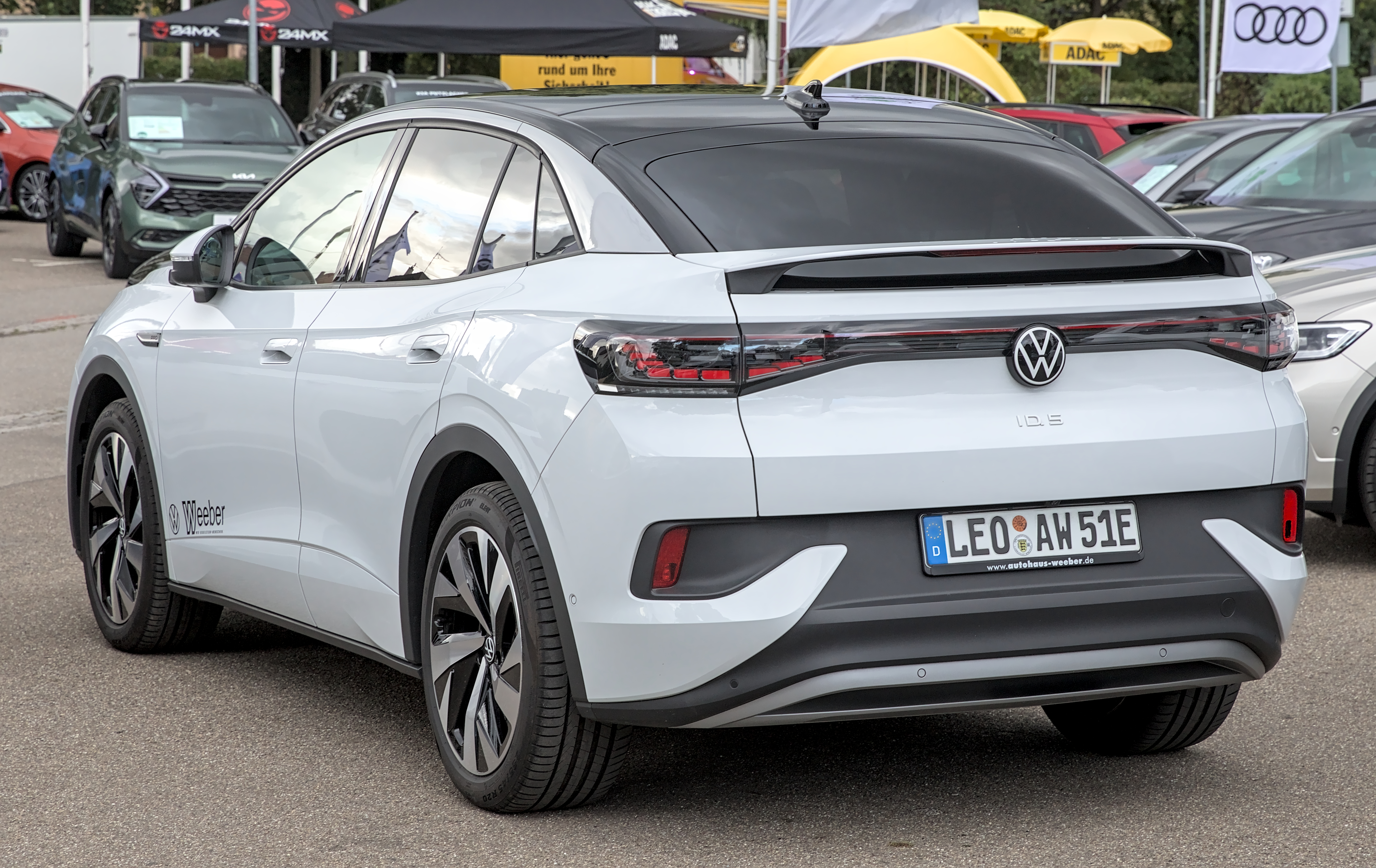
Rear view

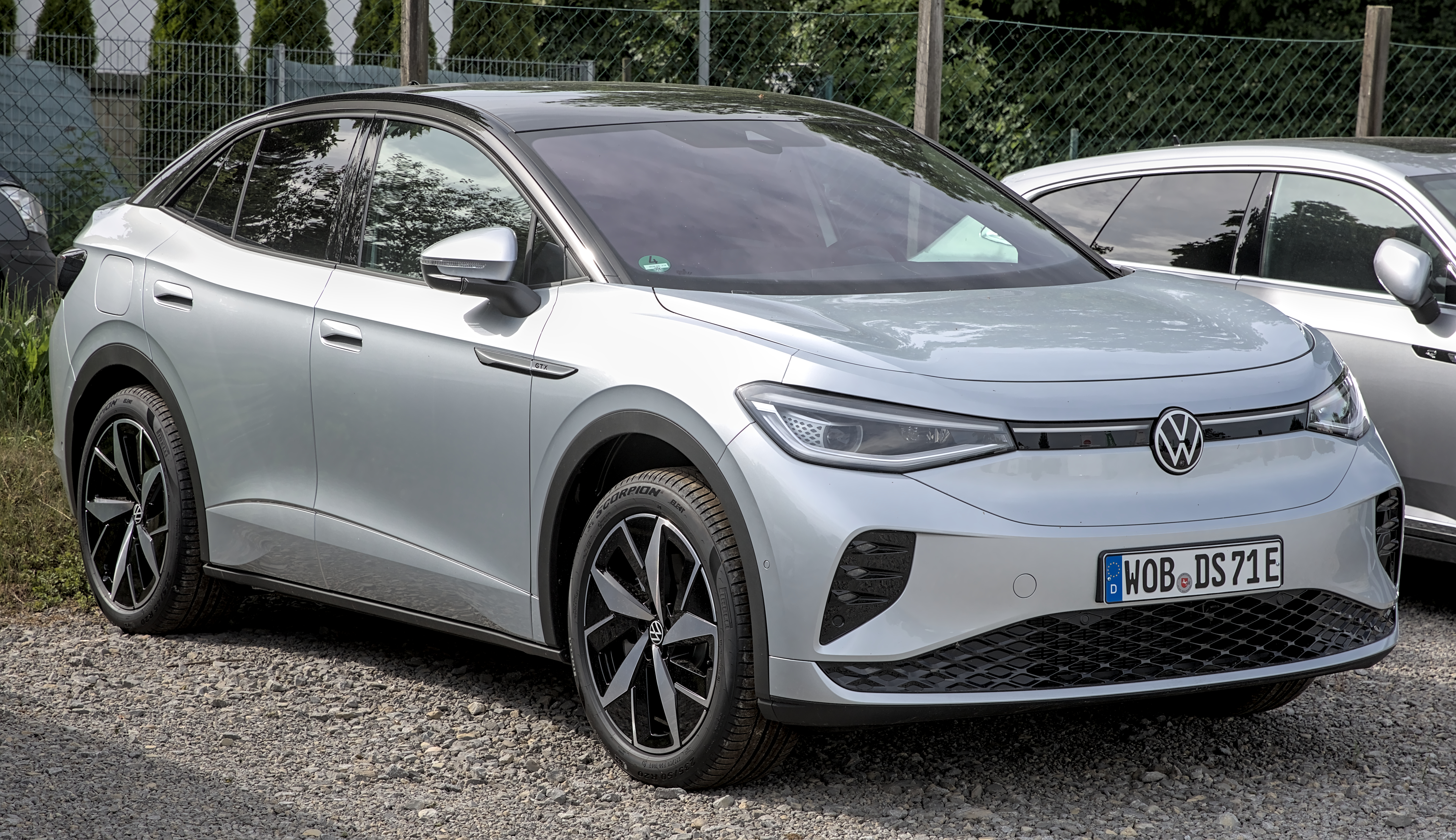
Volkswagen ID.5 GTX

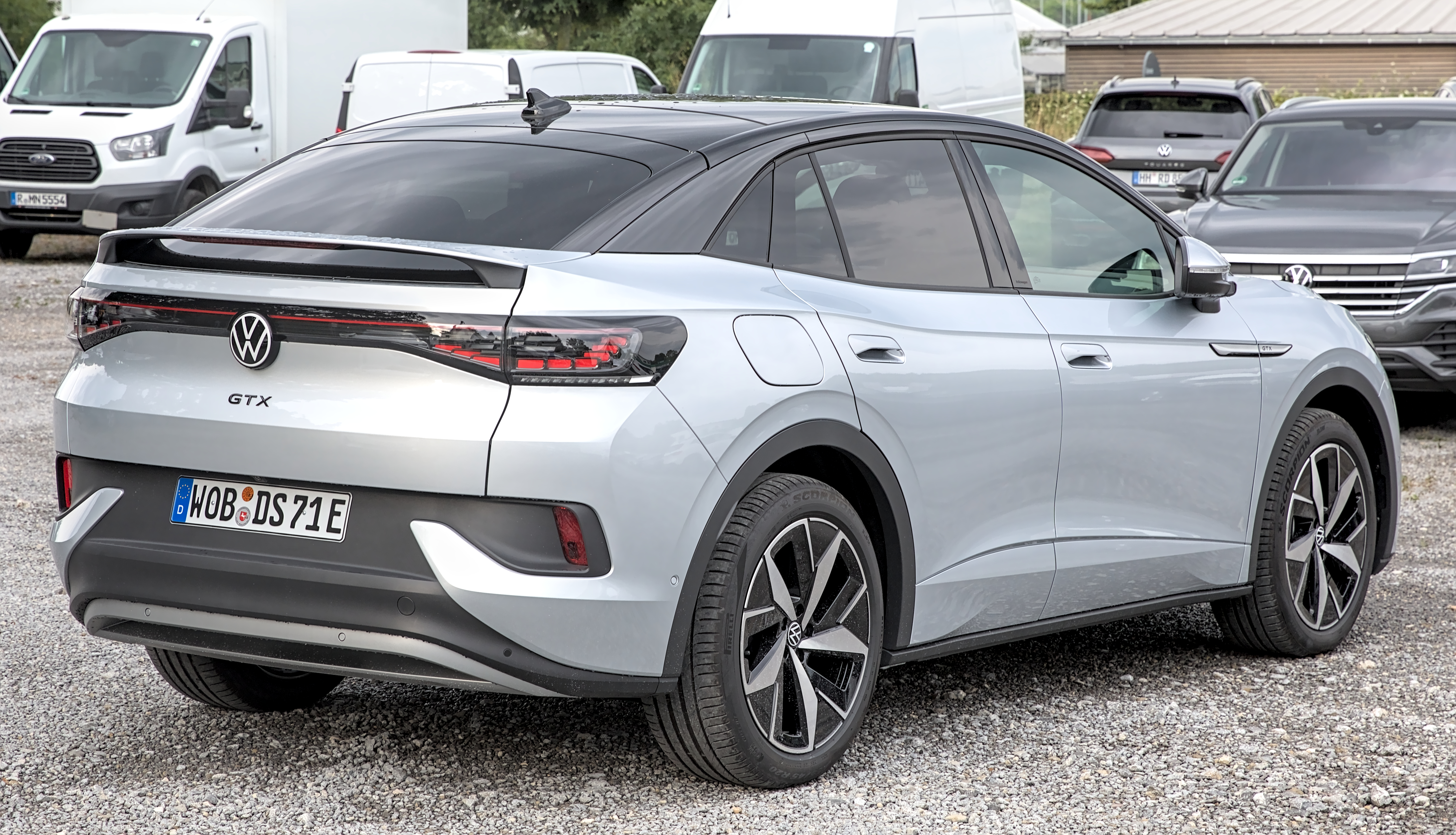
Rear view

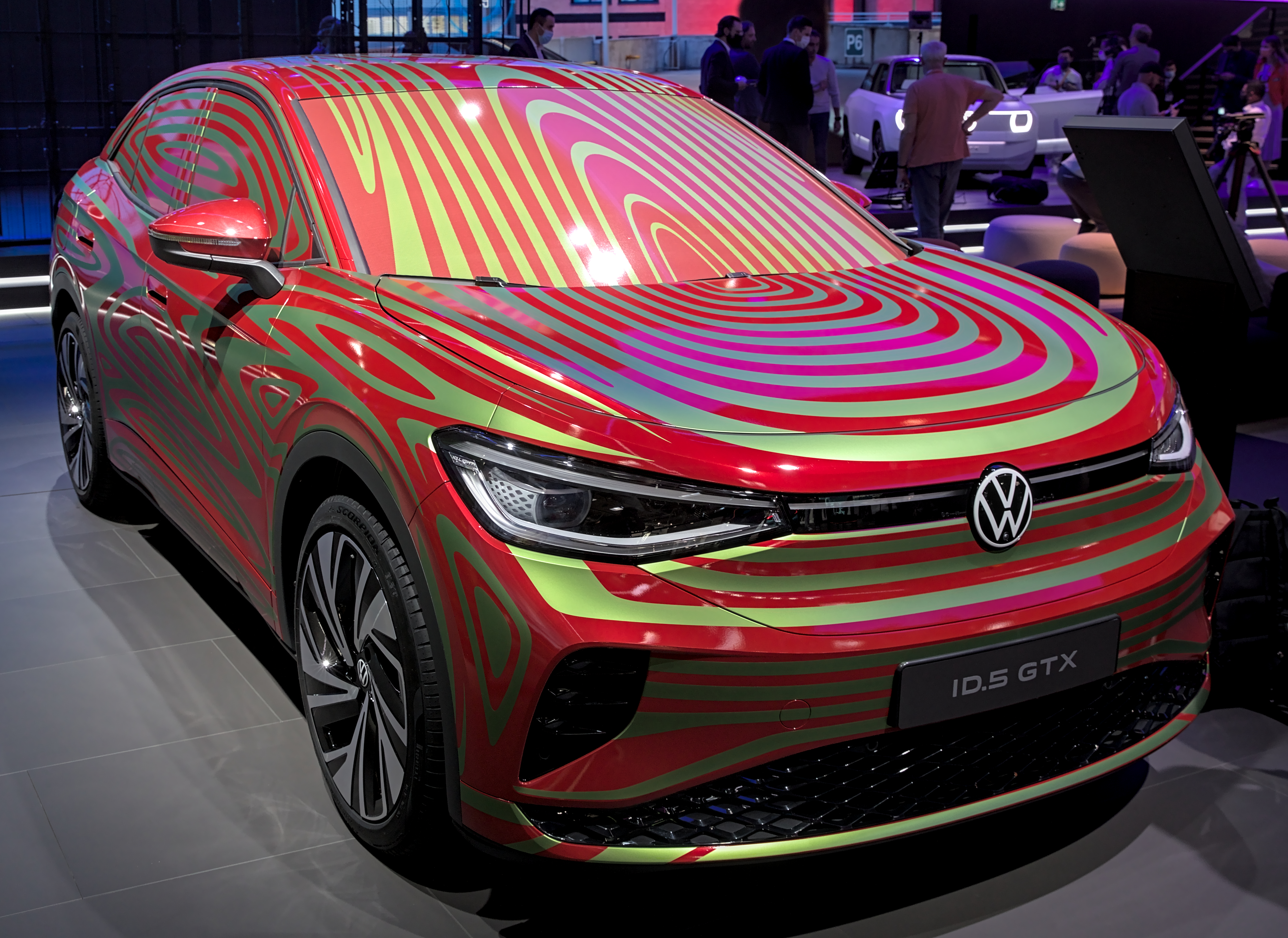
Volkswagen ID.5 Prototype

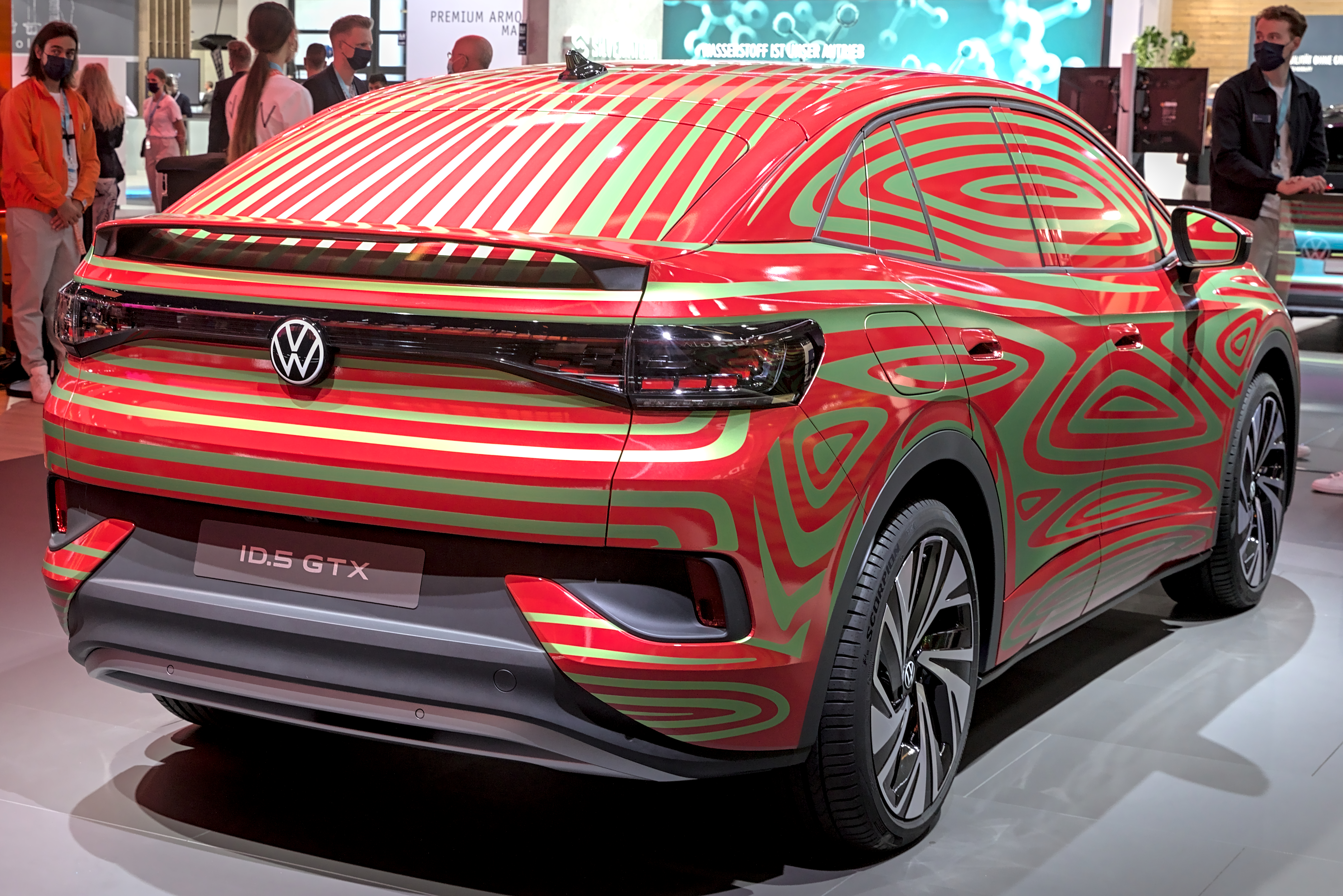
Rear view

== Specifications ==
=== Powertrain ===
Since model year 2024, the ID.4 is fitted with the APP 550 electric drive, which is an oil-cooled brushless permanently excited synchronous machine positioned at the rear axle. The motor produces up to 210 kW (286 PS; 282 hp) of power and up to 550 N⋅m (410 lb⋅ft) of torque, revolving at speeds of up to 16,000 rpm. All-wheel drive variants have an additional motor on the front axle.

The ID.4 recuperates energy when braking using the service brake pedal, with a deceleration of up to 0.25 g. When driving with the gear selector set to “D” mode, if the driver lifts their foot off the accelerator pedal, the vehicle is set to coast along in order to preserve energy, with the motor freely rotating. However the vehicle can also be set to “B” mode where it will recuperate instead, again with forces of up to 0.25 g. When stronger deceleration is required, the vehicle uses electrically boosted conventional hydraulic brakes via disc brakes at the front and sealed drum brakes at the rear.

=== Battery ===
The battery consists of a lithium-Ion battery pack which houses 9 battery modules in 10 compartments (Pure models) or 12 modules (Pro models) with each module containing the individual battery cells (24 per module) in a rectangular aluminium casing which sits in the vehicle's underbody. While the smaller battery holds an energy content of 55 kWh, of which 52 kWh are made available to the user, the larger pack comes in at 82/77 kWh. A model with a 62 kWh gross, 58 kWh net battery pack was released for the North American market in 2022. 82 kWh batteries supplied by LG Energy Solution originally had a peak DC fast charging rate of 125 kW, but was increased to 135 kW in an over-the-air update.

The battery's thermal management system is designed to maintain the battery's temperature around the ideal range of 25 °C (77 °F) and utilises liquid cooling.

Specifications
Model name		ID.4 Pure/Pure Performance	ID.4 Standard ID.4 S	ID.5 Pro ID.5 Pro Performance	ID.4 Pro ID.4 Pro Performance ID.4 Pro S	ID.4 AWD ID.4 AWD Pro ID.4 AWD Pro S (North America) ID.4 GTX (other markets)	ID.5 GTX
Battery capacity	Gross	55 kWh	62 kWh	82 kWh			
Battery capacity	Usable	52 kWh	58 kWh	77 kWh		77 kWh or 79 kWh	
Drivetrain		RWD				AWD	
Availability		Spring 2021	Summer 2022	Winter 2022	Spring 2021	Summer 2021	Winter 2022
Range	EPA	—N/a	209 miles (336 km)	—N/a	291 mi (468 km)	263 mi (423 km)	—N/a
Range	WLTP	363 km (226 mi)	—N/a	553 km (344 mi)	546 km (339 mi)	512 km (318 mi)	529 km (329 mi)
Accel. time	0–60 mph (0–97 km/h)	—N/a	7.1s	—N/a	7.7 s since MY 2024: 5.9 s	5.7 s since MY 2024: 4.9 s	—N/a
Accel. time	0–100 km/h (0–62 mph)	10.9 s or 9 s since MY 2024: 9 s	—N/a	10.4 s or 8.4 s since MY 2024: 6.7 s	10.4 s or 8.5 s since MY 2024: 6.7 s	6.2 s since MY 2024: 5.4 s	6.3 s since MY 2024: 5.4 s
Power output		109 kW (146 hp; 148 PS) or 125 kW (168 hp; 170 PS) since MY 2024: 125 kW (168 hp; 170 PS)	150 kW (201 hp; 204 PS)	128 kW (172 hp; 174 PS) or 150 kW (201 hp; 204 PS) since MY 2024: 210 kW (282 hp; 286 PS)		220 kW (295 hp; 299 PS) since MY 2024: 250 kW (335 hp; 340 PS)	
Peak torque		220 N⋅m (162 lb⋅ft) or 310 N⋅m (229 lb⋅ft) since MY 2024: 310 N⋅m (229 lb⋅ft)	310 N⋅m (229 lb⋅ft)	235 N⋅m (173 lb⋅ft) or 310 N⋅m (229 lb⋅ft) since MY 2024: 545 N⋅m (402 lb⋅ft)		460 N⋅m (339 lb⋅ft) since MY 2024: 679 N⋅m (501 lb⋅ft)	
Top speed		160 km/h (99 mph)		160 km/h (99 mph) since MY 2024: 180 km/h (112 mph)		180 km/h (112 mph)	
Kerb weight		1,987 kg (4,381 lb)	1,958 kg (4,317 lb)	2,143 kg (4,725 lb)	2,156 kg (4,753 lb)	2,256 kg (4,974 lb)	2,167 kg (4,777 lb)
Peak DC fast charge (DCFC) rate		115 kW	140 kW (previously 125 kW)	135 kW	LG ES: 135 kW (previously 125 kW); SK On: 175 kW (previously 170 kW)	175 kW	
Peak AC charging power		11 kW, previously 7.2 kW	11 kW				
Charging time	0-100% 11.0 kW AC	330 minutes	450 min	480 minutes			
Charging time	10-80% DC (peak rate)	28 minutes (115 kW)	29 minutes (140 kW)	28 minutes (135 kW)	28 minutes (Europe 135 kW; North America 175 kW)	28 minutes (175 kW)	

== Markets ==
=== Europe ===
For the European market, the ID.4 is available with four electric motor options. The versions with 146 hp (148 PS; 109 kW) or 168 hp (170 PS; 125 kW) are powered by a 52 kWh (usable) 55 kWh (gross) battery pack, while the larger 77 kWh (usable) 82 kWh (gross) battery can be paired with either a 172 hp (174 PS; 128 kW) or a 201 hp (204 PS; 150 kW) motor in early years, while in later years an improved motor with 286 hp (290 PS; 213 kW) replaced the latter. The 77 kWh model has an WLTP range of "up to" 351 mi (565 km) on a single charge.

An AWD variant of the ID.4, marketed as the ID.4 GTX in Europe, accelerates 0–96 km/h (0–60 mph) in 4.9 seconds and 0–100 km/h (0–62 mph) in 5.4 seconds. Later models of the GTX have a 79 kWh (usable), 85 kWh (gross) battery pack exclusive to the GTX model.

The ID.4 is produced at the Volkswagen Zwickau-Mosel Plant in Germany since start of production and is also built at the company's Emden plant since May 2022.

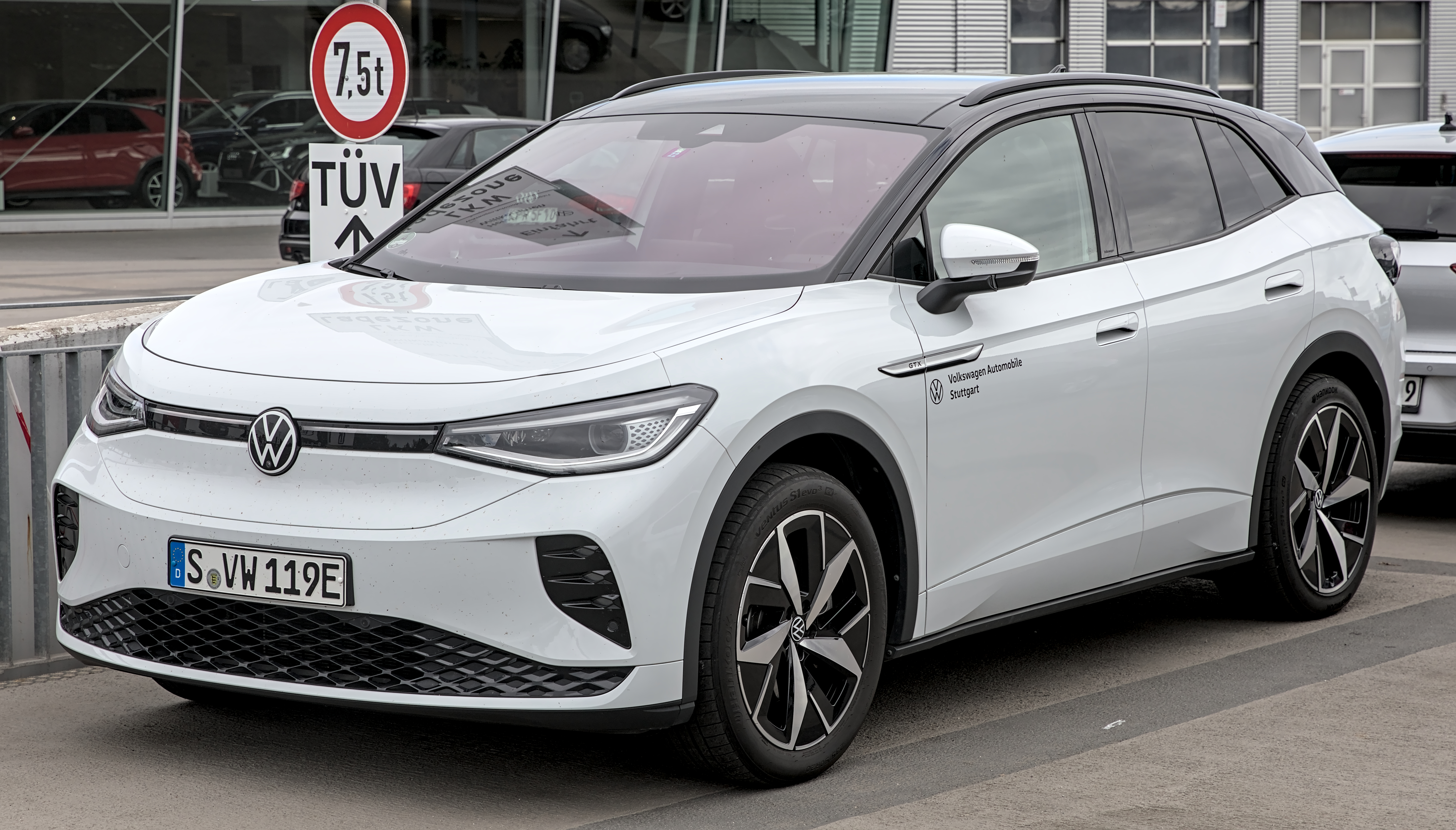
Volkswagen ID.4 GTX

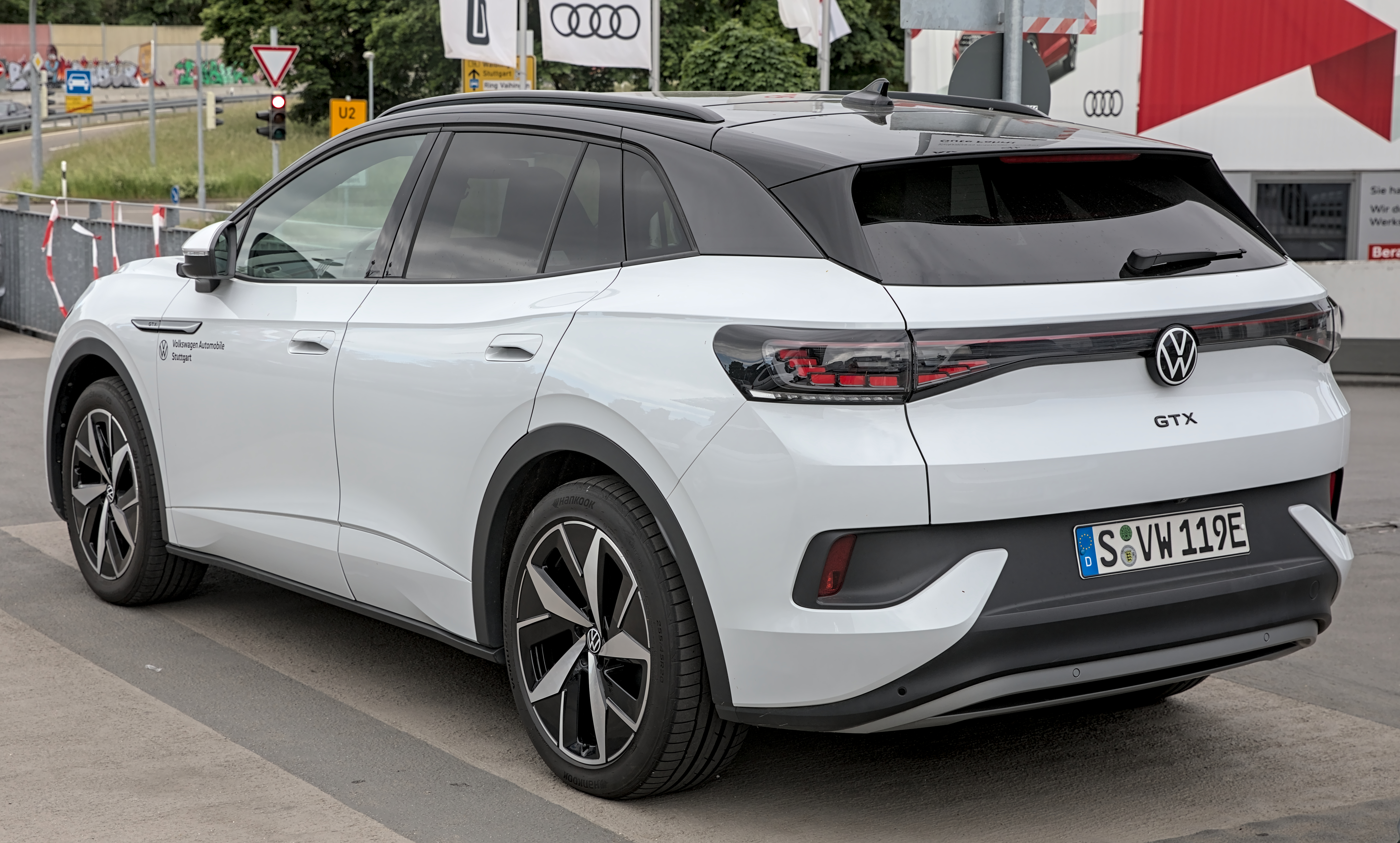
Volkswagen ID.4 GTX

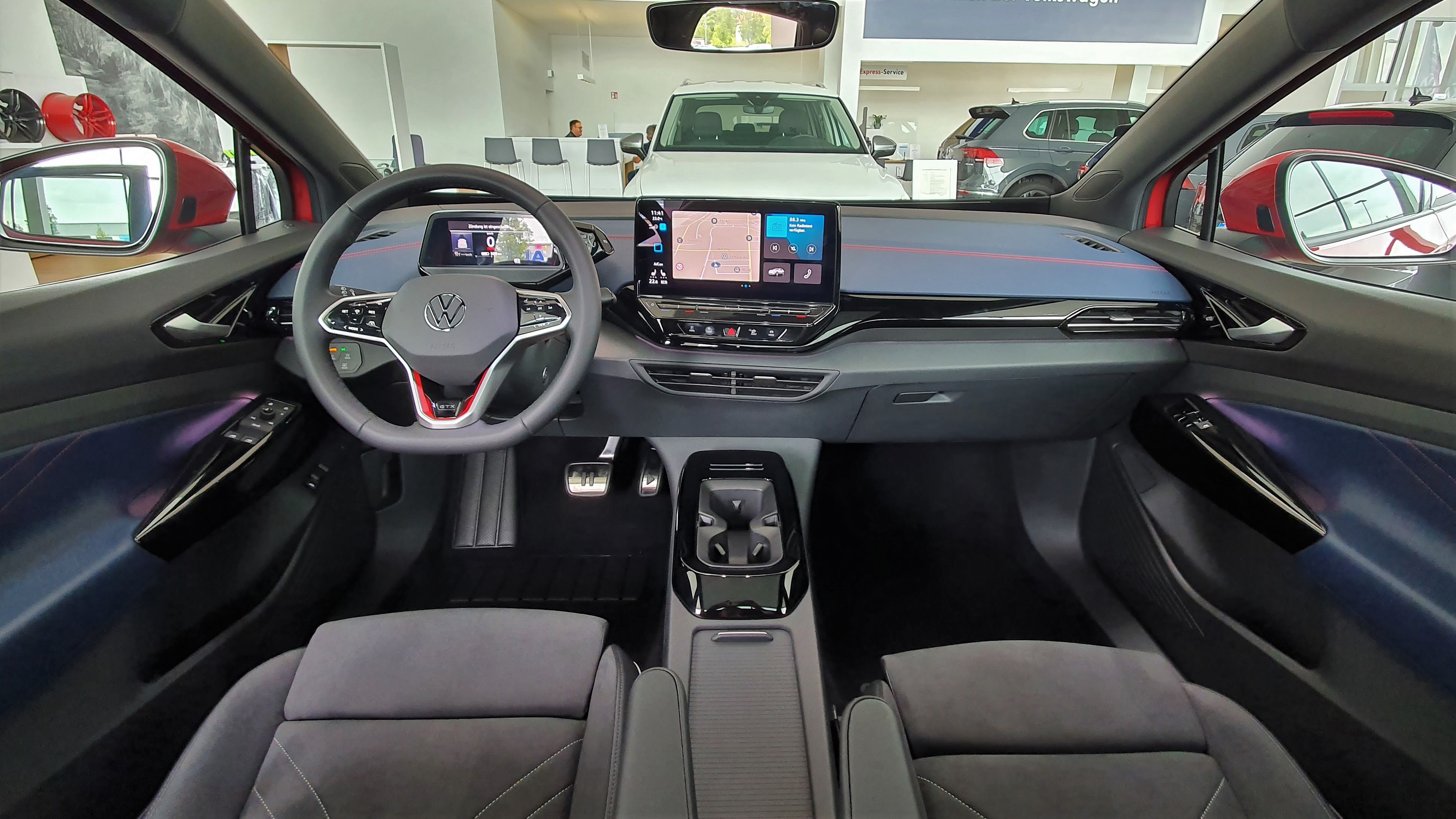
Interior

=== North America ===
For the North American market, the available battery packs are either 62 kWh or 82 kWh (gross capacity) that are positioned in the underbody. The 82 kWh battery pack offers a range of 245–291 mi (394–468 km) on a full charge on the EPA cycle, depending on version. The 62 kWh battery pack is rated at 209 miles (336 km) by the EPA. There have been two primary motors offered in the North American market. 82 kWh models made from 2021-2023 have the APP 310 offering 201 horsepower (150 kW) or 295 horsepower (220 kW) with a front auxiliary motor equipped in AWD models, while 82kWh models made from 2024 onwards use VW's new APP 550 motor, offering improved efficiency while simultaneously offering more power, at 282 horsepower (210 kW) or 335 horsepower (250 kW). 62kWh models all use a rear mounted APP 310 and does not offer AWD.

2021-2022 models were imported to North America and built in the Volkswagen Zwickau-Mosel Plant or Emden plant since model year 2022.

In August 2022, Volkswagen announced production location changes and added features for 2023 model year ID.4s: as of the 2023 model, Volkswagen ID.4 units sold in North America would be made in Volkswagen's Chattanooga Tennessee Assembly Plant. Chattanooga began producing the ID.4 on July 26, 2022.

The North American ID.4 got a moderate refresh for model year 2023. It introduced a new 62 kWh battery pack that is now on the new Standard and S trim levels. The 62 kWh (gross) battery pack is provided exclusively by SK On and has a peak charging rate of 140 kW. The larger 82 kWh (gross) battery pack got updated. For exclusively the 2023 model year, batteries are split between two suppliers to increase production output: SK On and LG Energy Solution. On 82 kWh RWD models, some vehicles get the SK On battery pack providing a 170 kW peak charging speed, while other vehicles get the LG Energy Solutions battery pack with a 135 kW peak charging speed as used in most pre-2023 model year vehicles. All 82 kWh AWD models get the SK On battery. Volkswagen quotes a 10-80% DC fast charging time of 30 minutes for the SK On battery pack and 36 minutes for the LG battery pack. The battery capacity and EPA rated range are identical between the two battery packs. After the 2023 model year, all batteries are supplied by SK On. 2024 and above 82 kWh models have improved the charging peak up to 175 kW and the 10-80% charging speed down from 30 minutes to 28 minutes.

The 2023 refresh also includes specific changes to North American models, such as a redesigned center console, a larger 12-inch Discover Pro Max infotainment system, Park Assist Plus (autonomous parking system), assisted lane changing to the semi-autonomous highway assist system branded Volkswagen Travel Assist and 45-watt USB-C fast device charging standard across all trims. As well as new options like Area View (surround view camera system), three-zone automatic climate control, heated rear seats, and new paint colors.

For the 2025 model year, the 62 kWh model was renamed from ID.4 Standard to ID.4 Limited, it was pulled off Volkswagen configuration websites and was sent to dealers as an off-menu option, for the 2026 model year, it appears the 62 kWh model has been quietly discontinued entirely, although there hasn't been a specific announcement from Volkswagen.

Volkswagen ended production of the ID.4 in its Chattanooga Assembly Plant in April 2026, after just three years of local assembly in the United States.

=== China ===
The Volkswagen ID.4 is available as two variants in China called the ID.4 X and the ID.4 Crozz. The two variants feature slightly different styling and are produced by SAIC-Volkswagen and FAW-Volkswagen respectively.

The ID.4 Crozz is similar to the European ID.4 and is offered with a smaller battery and a range of 400 km (249 mi) and 125 kW (168 hp; 170 PS) of power as well as a longer-ranged version offering 550 km (342 mi) of range according to the NEDC test and 150 kW (201 hp; 204 PS) of power. A high performance version with dual motor all-wheel drive and 225 kW (302 hp; 306 PS) as well as 520 km (323 mi) of range is to be released as well. For the SAIC-Volkswagen ID.4 X, the car gains 20 mm (0.8 in) in length, mainly through the addition of a different bumper.

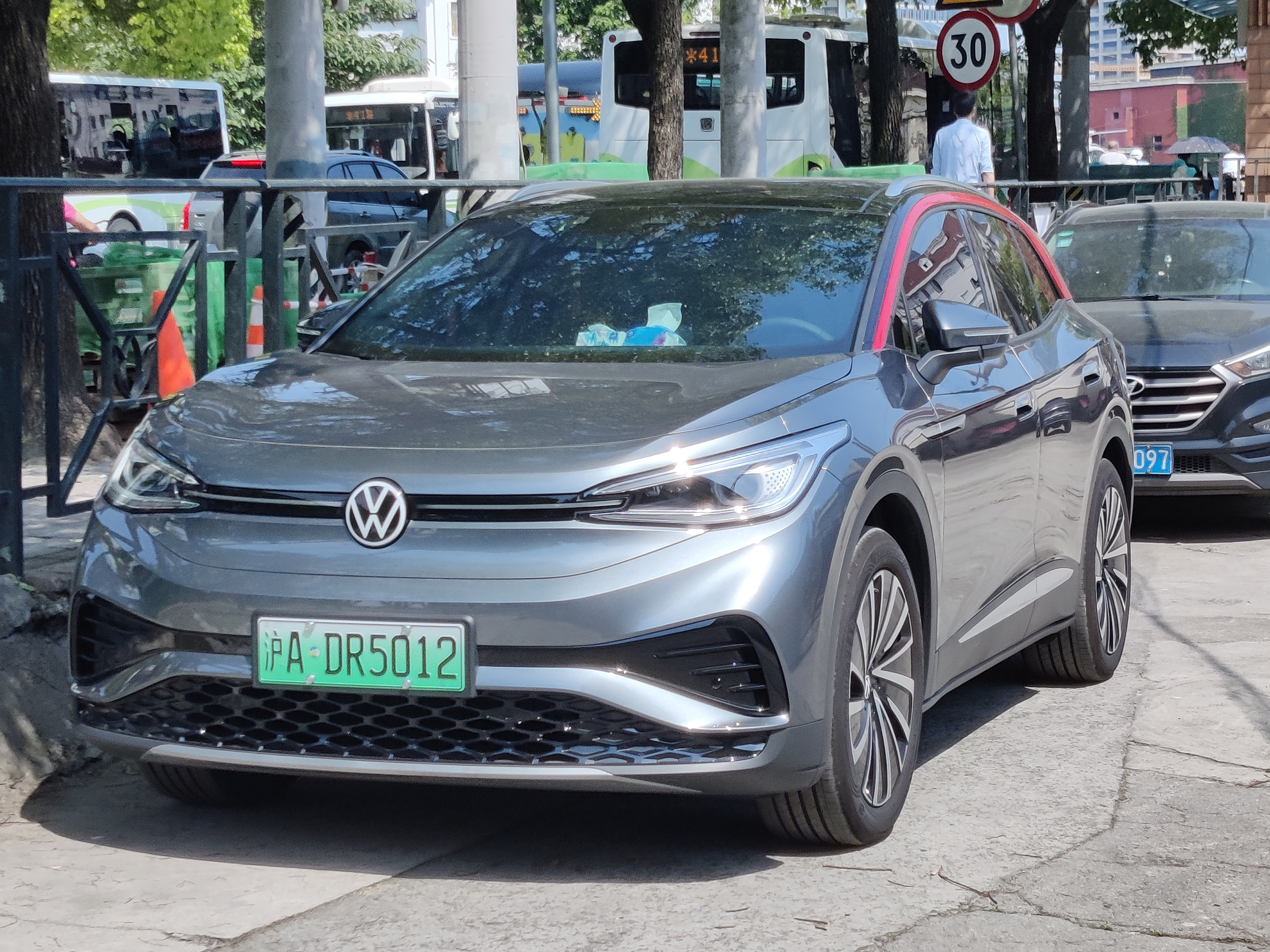
Volkswagen ID.4 X (China)

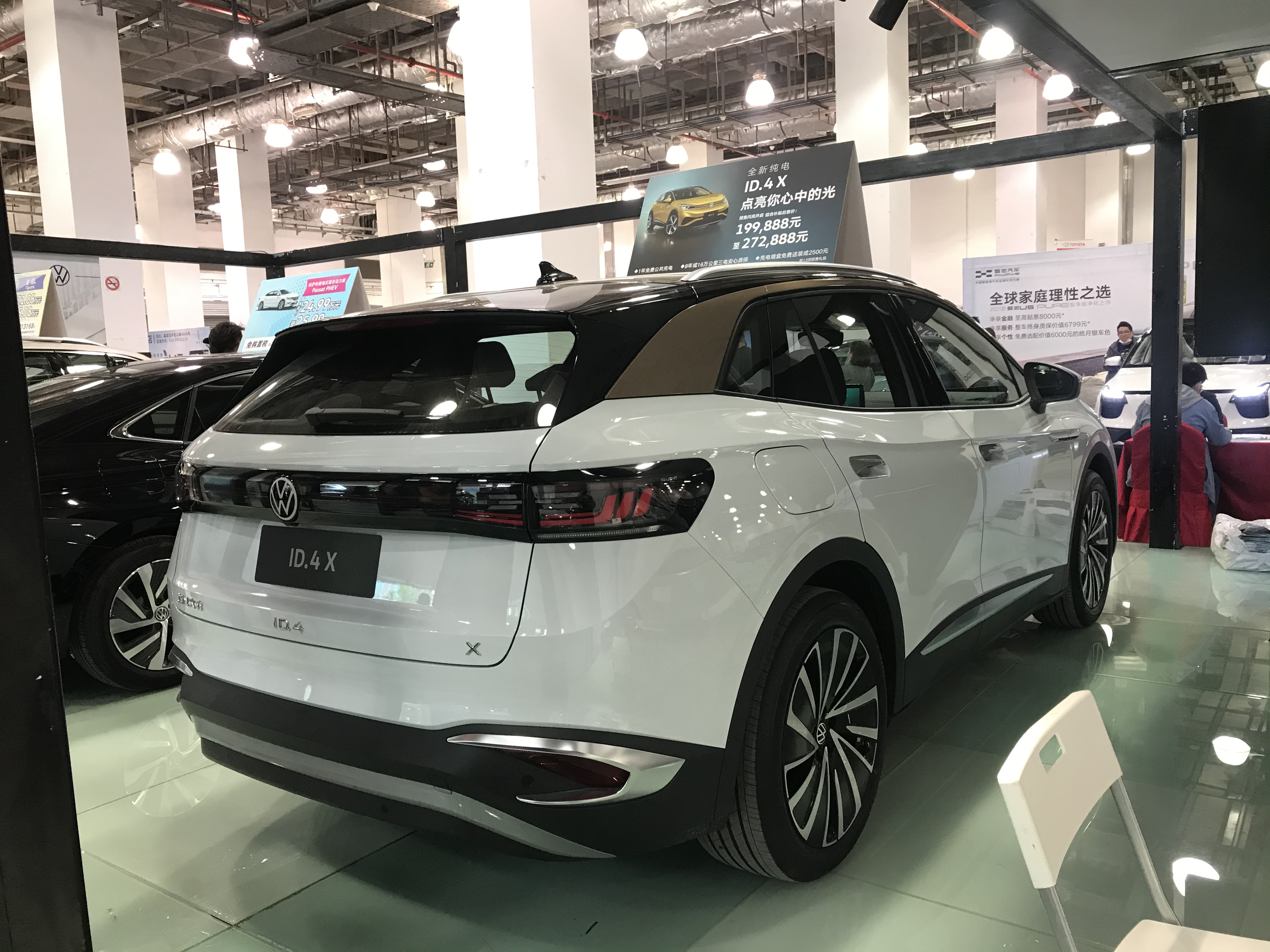
Volkswagen ID.4 X (China)

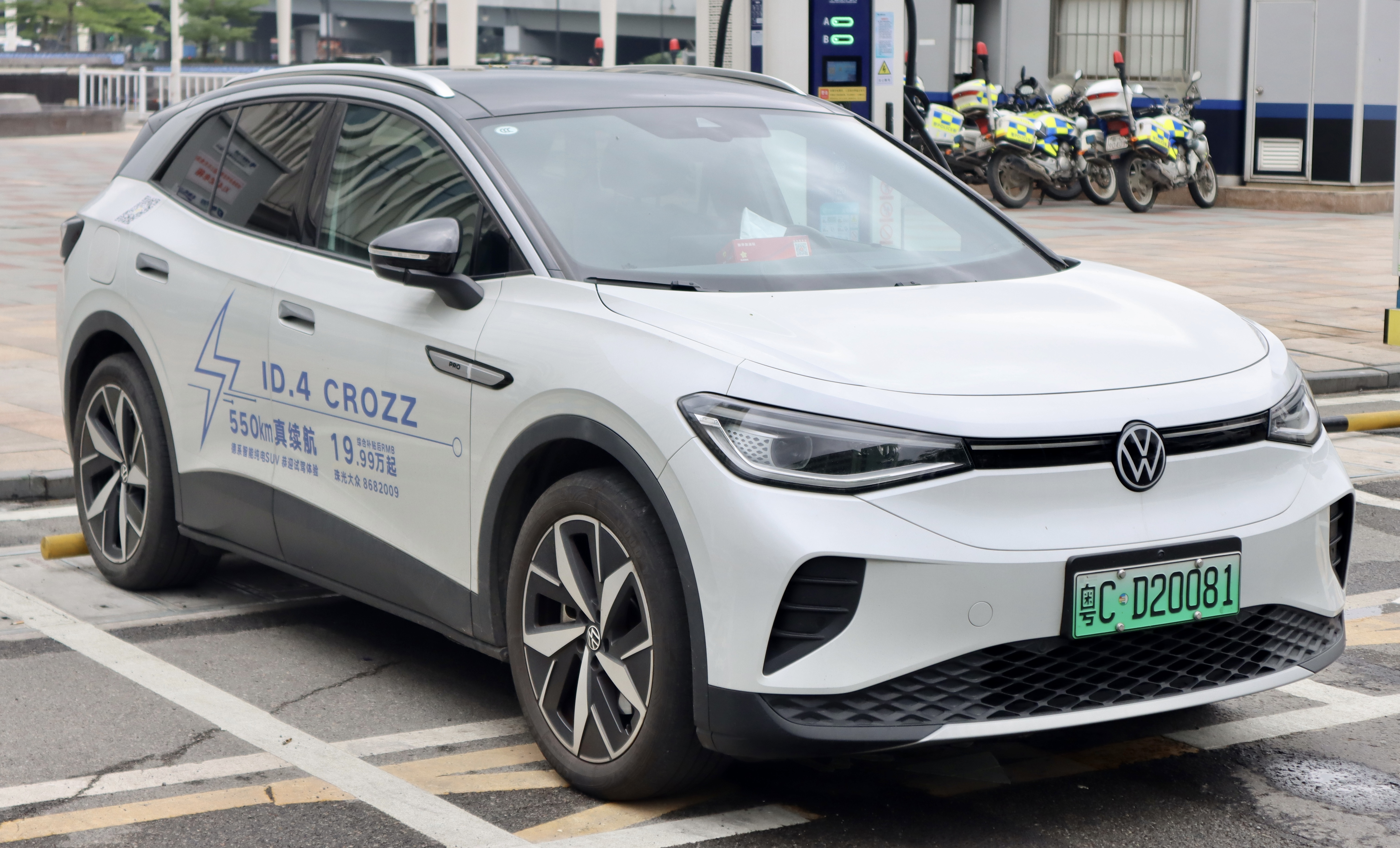
Volkswagen ID.4 Crozz (China)

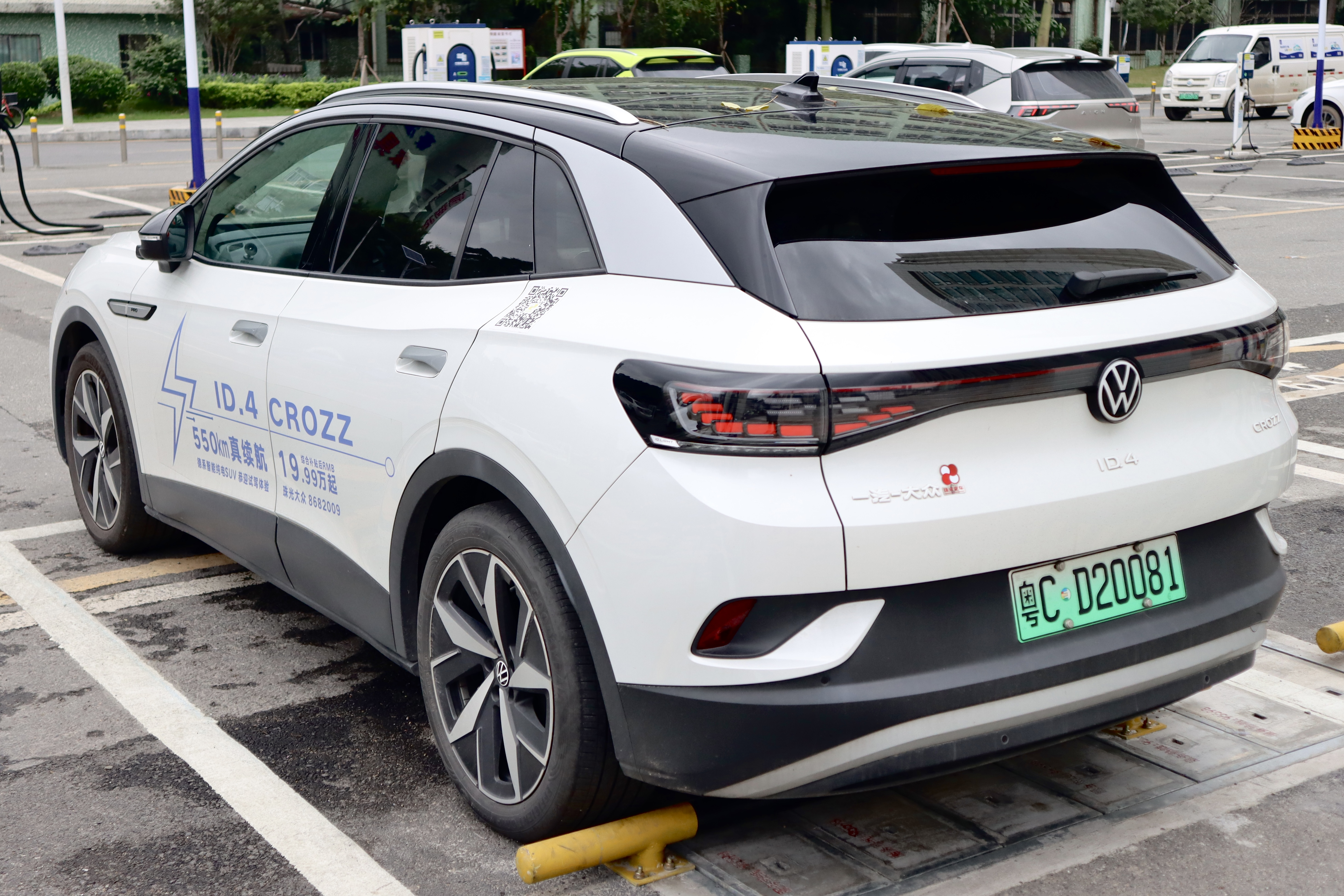
Volkswagen ID.4 Crozz (China)

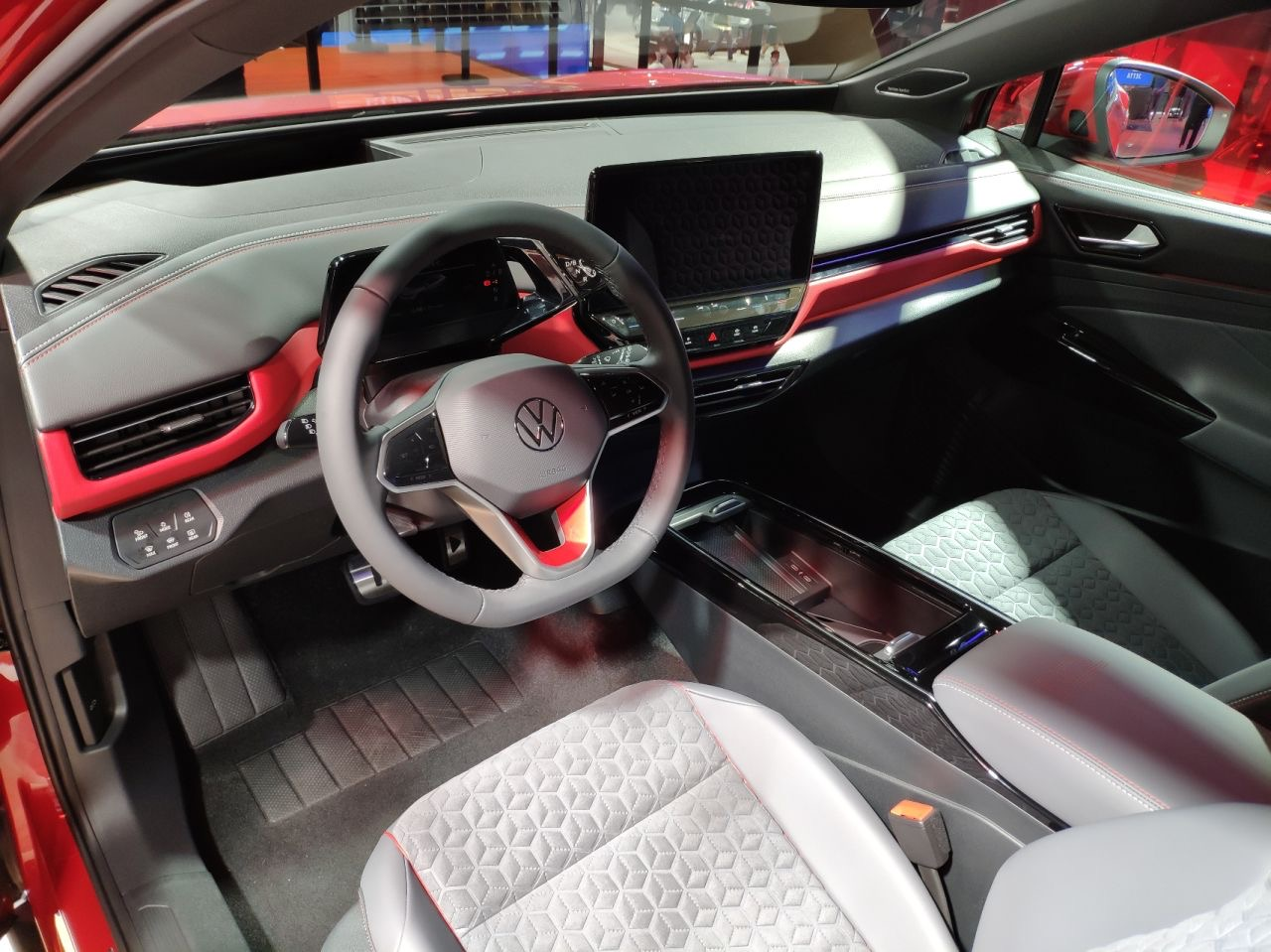
Volkswagen ID.4 Crozz interior

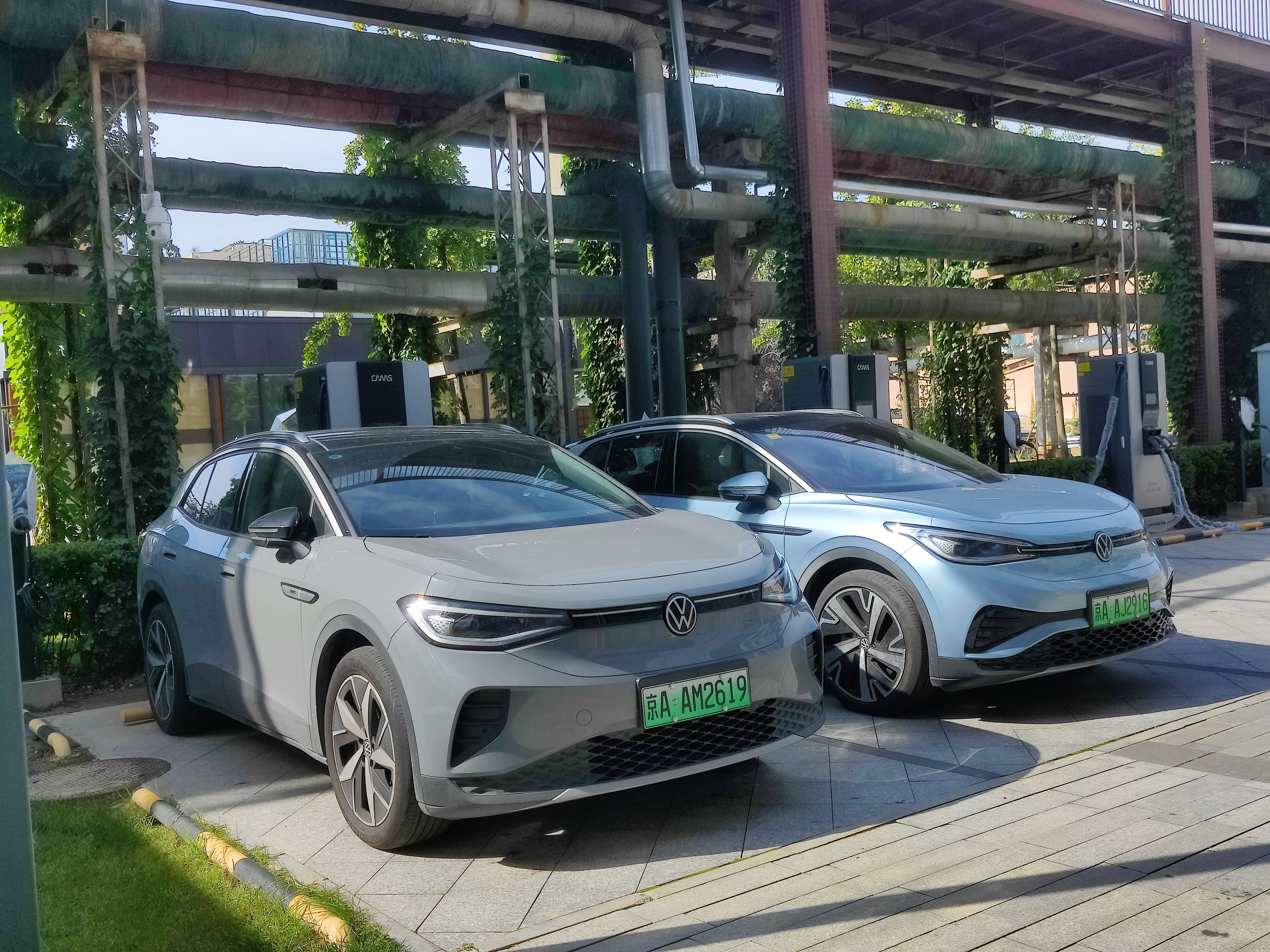
Volkswagen ID.4 Crozz and ID.4 X side by side

=== Australia ===
The ID.4 was launched in Australia in 2025. In the Australian market, the ID.4 competes with the facelifted Tesla Model Y and the BYD Sealion 7.

Only the larger, 82-kWh battery is offered in Australia. Both rear-wheel-drive and all-wheel-drive variants are available. The ID.5 coupe SUV was also launched in Australia alongside the ID.4.

== Safety ==
=== ANCAP ===
ANCAP test results Volkswagen ID.4 (2021, aligned with Euro NCAP)
Test	Points	%
Overall:	5 /5 stars	
Adult occupant:	35.63	93%
Child occupant:	43.81	89%
Pedestrian:	41.29	76%
Safety assist:	12.28	76%

ANCAP test results Volkswagen ID.5 (2021, aligned with Euro NCAP)
Test	Points	%
Overall:	5 /5 stars	
Adult occupant:	35.63	93%
Child occupant:	43.81	89%
Pedestrian:	41.29	76%
Safety assist:	12.28	76%

=== Euro NCAP ===
Euro NCAP test results Volkswagen ID.4 rear-drive (2021)
Test	Points	%
Overall:	5 /5 stars	
Adult occupant:	35.6	93%
Child occupant:	44.0	89%
Pedestrian:	41.3	76%
Safety assist:	13.6	85%

Euro NCAP test results Volkswagen ID.4 Pro 4x2 (LHD) (2025)
Test	Points	%
Overall:	5 /5 stars	
Adult occupant:	35.9	89%
Child occupant:	43.0	87%
Pedestrian:	52.9	84%
Safety assist:	13.8	76%

=== IIHS ===
The ID.4 in North America was awarded "Top Safety Pick+" by the IIHS from 2021 to 2023.

IIHS scores
Small overlap front (Driver)	Good	
Small overlap front (Passenger)	Good	
Moderate overlap front (Original test)	Good	
Side (Original test)	Good	
Side (Updated test)	Good	
Roof strength	Good	
Head restraints and seats	Good	
Headlights (Varies by trim/option)	Good	Acceptable
Front crash prevention: Vehicle-to-vehicle	Superior	
Front crash prevention: Vehicle-to-pedestrian (Day)	Advanced	
Front crash prevention: Vehicle-to-pedestrian (Night)	Basic	
Child seat anchors (LATCH) ease of use	Good	

== Sales and marketing ==
ID.4 and ID.5 sales
Year	Global production		Europe	US	China	
Year	ID.4	ID.5	Europe	US	ID.4 X	ID.4 Crozz
2020	6,487		4,810			
2021	134,319		53,605	16,742	23,174	26,853
2022	207,934		67,655	20,511	33,761	34,273
2023	223,425			37,789	22,552	36,869
2024	182,000			17,021	34,301	35,621
2025	163,400				15,440	16,367

In the 2023 French animated film Ladybug & Cat Noir: The Movie, Cat Noir drives an ID.4, following a deal between Volkswagen and French company ZAG Inc.

== See also ==
- Volkswagen ID. series
- Volkswagen ID. Tiguan
- Volkswagen ID.3
- Volkswagen ID. Buzz
- List of Volkswagen vehicles
