= Volkswagen ID. Tiguan =

Battery electric compact crossover SUV

- VW ID. Tiguan (Europe)

Overview
- Manufacturer: Volkswagen
- Production: November 2026 – present
- Assembly: Germany: Emden

Body and chassis
- Class: Compact crossover SUV (C)
- Body style: 5-door SUV
- Layout: Rear-motor, rear-wheel-drive Dual-motor, all-wheel-drive
- Platform: MEB+ platform
- Related: Volkswagen ID. Aura T6; Volkswagen ID.3; Volkswagen ID. Buzz; Volkswagen ID.6; Škoda Enyaq; Audi Q4 e-tron; Cupra Tavascan; Ford Explorer EV; Ford Capri EV

Dimensions
- Wheelbase: 2,765 mm (108.9 in)
- Length: 4,618 mm (181.8 in)
- Width: 1,855 mm (73.0 in)
- Height: 1,619 mm (63.7 in)
- Curb weight: 2,073–2,237 kg (4,570–4,932 lb)

Chronology
- Predecessor: Volkswagen ID.4/ID.5

The Volkswagen ID. Tiguan is an upcoming battery electric compact crossover SUV manufactured by Volkswagen in late 2026. It is the successor to the Volkswagen ID.4 and ID.5.

== Overview ==
The ID. Tiguan was fully unveiled on 9 October 2026. Compared to its predecessor, the ID.4, it has been extensively refreshed, and it continues to use the MEB+ platform. It was renamed after its similarly-sized ICE sibling, the Tiguan, to simplify and streamline VW's model names between both electric and combustion vehicles by using recognizable legacy model names. It entered production in November 2026.

The ID. Tiguan's exterior uses Volkswagen's Pure Positive design language, first used on the ID. Polo. Compared to the ID.4, it features a more upright body and a variety of updated design elements, such as a new front and rear light bar, four rounded rectangular taillight elements, significantly reduced black plastic trim on the sides, and traditional door handles. Its drag coefficient has been lowered to 0.26 Cd.

It is also offered with an R-line trim level, which replaces the discontinued GTX trim from the ID.4, featuring sportier cosmetics such as 21-inch wheels and reshaped bumpers.

The interior has been completely redesigned, with a triple-screen setup consisting of a 15.0-inch main central display, a 10.0-inch instrument panel and an optional 12.0-inch passenger display. An augmented reality heads-up display is also available. Similar to other recent Volkswagen models, a significant number of physical controls have been reintroduced. This includes a steering wheel with full physical controls and individual buttons, four individual window switches instead of two, and a row of physical rocker switches for temperature, volume, and other important vehicle controls below the central air vents. Top models will be available with heated, ventilated, and massaging seats, a Harman Kardon sound system, and a panoramic sunroof. It has a trunk capacity of 534 litres (18.9 cu ft), and a small frunk.

One-pedal driving is standard on all models, while a new Connected Travel Assist system is offered, allowing automatic lane-changing functions and automatic braking at an observed red traffic light. A new Digital Key allows the ID. Tiguan can be unlocked and started using a smartphone app. Furthermore, it is capable of towing up to 2,000 kg (4,400 lb).

Rear view

R-Line

R-Line rear

Interior

== Powertrain ==
At launch, three powertrains are available. The base rear wheel drive model produces 188 hp (140 kW; 191 PS) and uses a 58 kWh battery, the upgraded rear wheel drive model produces 282 hp (210 kW; 286 PS) and uses a 77 kWh battery, while the all wheel drive model produces 295 hp (220 kW; 299 PS) and the aforementioned 77 kWh battery. Models equipped with the 58 kWh battery can charge at up to 105 kW, while those with the 77 kWh battery can charge at up to 165 kW, all requiring approximately 30 minutes to charge from 10% to 80%. Volkswagen estimates up to 372 mi (599 km) of driving range on the WLTP cycle. All models also feature a vehicle-to-load feature to power external devices using the vehicle's battery.
