= Volkswagen Zwickau-Mosel Plant =

German car factory

Coordinates: 50.793469°N 12.487197°E

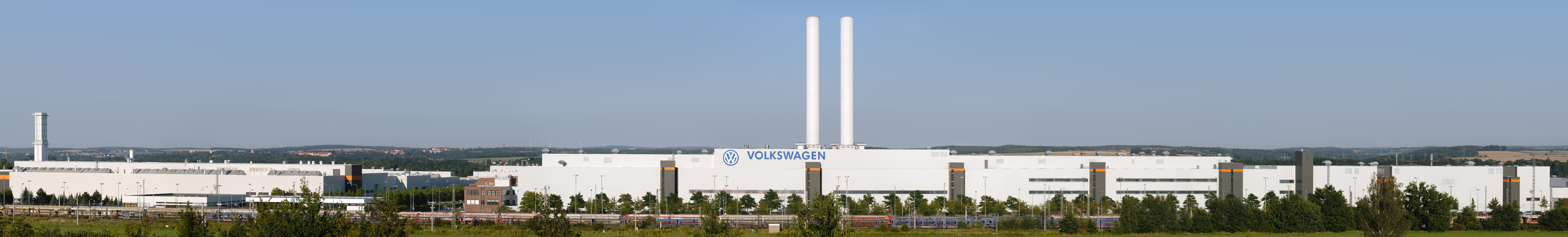
Zwickau-Mosel plant

The Volkswagen Zwickau-Mosel Plant (German: Volkswagenwerk Zwickau) is an automobile factory in today's Zwickau district of Mosel in Saxony (Sachsen), Germany. Founded on 26 September 1990, together with the Chemnitz plant and the Transparent Factory, it belongs to Volkswagen Sachsen based in Zwickau. In spring 2019, the Zwickau plant had about 8,000 employees, as of October 2026 it had 6,500. Signalling a milestone the last combustion vehicle was produced on 26 June 2020.

== History ==
With the founding of Horch and Audi in 1904 and 1909 respectively, Zwickau became the cradle of the Saxon automobile industry. Following the partition of Germany after the Second World War, and the formation of East Germany (GDR), all private enterprise was seized by the government, which included the former Audi and Horch factories in Zwickau, with their parent Auto Union formally relocating to Ingolstadt in West Germany in 1949, from where the modern Audi company evolved.

VEB Sachsenring was established by the GDR in the 1950s to manufacture a national automobile – the Trabant – out of the former Auto Union works. Between 1978 and 1982, VEB Saschenring constructed a new factory on the outskirts of Zwickau in nearby Mosel, as the old facilities had increasingly become inadequate.

Due to the traditions of automotive engineering in the region and because of the skilled workers potential, Volkswagen decided as the first large enterprise of the federal republic to build up a completely new plant in Saxony and provided for it considerable investments. As a result, other investors settled in the region.

Already in the final phase of the GDR the Trabant 1.1 was built in the newer Mosel plant from 1989 with a four-cylinder four-stroke engine manufactured under Volkswagen license. The production was discontinued in 1991, because parallel to this one the mass production of the Volkswagen Polo Mk2 had already started on 21 May 1990 in the Mosel factory. On 15 February 1991, the production of the Volkswagen Golf Mk2 began parallel to the Polo production. Volkswagen also began construction of a major expansion of the Mosel plant following German reunification, with the old Saschenring site in the centre of Zwickau being largely demolished – only the historic Audi factory building was retained and now houses the August Horch Museum Zwickau. The new expanded manufacturing plant was completed in 1993.

The suburb Mosel was incorporated into Zwickau on 1 January 1999. In 2007, they officially introduced the new factory designation Volkswagen-Fahrzeugwerk Zwickau.

Since production began in 1990, around 6 million Volkswagen vehicles have been delivered. In 2010, 1,350 vehicles of the Volkswagen model series Golf and Passat left the production lines of the Volkswagen plant every day. With 250,000 vehicles, 2010 was a record result. In addition, there are the bodies for the luxury class vehicles Phaeton and Bentley Continental GT, which are completely painted with special transporters in the Transparent Factory Dresden or in Crewe in England. Since 2001, around 100,000 bodies have been produced for the Phaeton and Bentley Continental series (50,000 each). Since 2017, bodies for the Bentley Bentayga and since 2018 bodies for the Lamborghini Urus have been produced at the Zwickau plant.

On 11 May 2004, the festive event for the 100th anniversary of the founding of Horch was held. High-ranking persons from politics and economics appreciated the scientific and technical achievements of the car makers from southwest Saxony in their greetings.

Directly adjacent is also a factory of the supplier GKN Driveline, which operates out of the old VEB Saschenring part of the plant that was constructed in the late 1970 to manufacture Trabants.

In 2019, the factory was completely converted to the production of electric cars. The last internal combustion engine (ICE) vehicle rolled off the Zwickau plant on 26 June 2020. The car is a seventh generation Golf R Estate with 2.0-litre petrol engine in Oryx White Pearl Effect. With the 9,512,001th ICE vehicle produced in the plant, it effectively ended 116 years of ICE vehicle assembly in Zwickau-Mosel.

Production of the Audi Q4 e-tron began at the plant in 2021, marking the first time that Audis have been manufactured in Zwickau in the post-war period.

== Current production ==
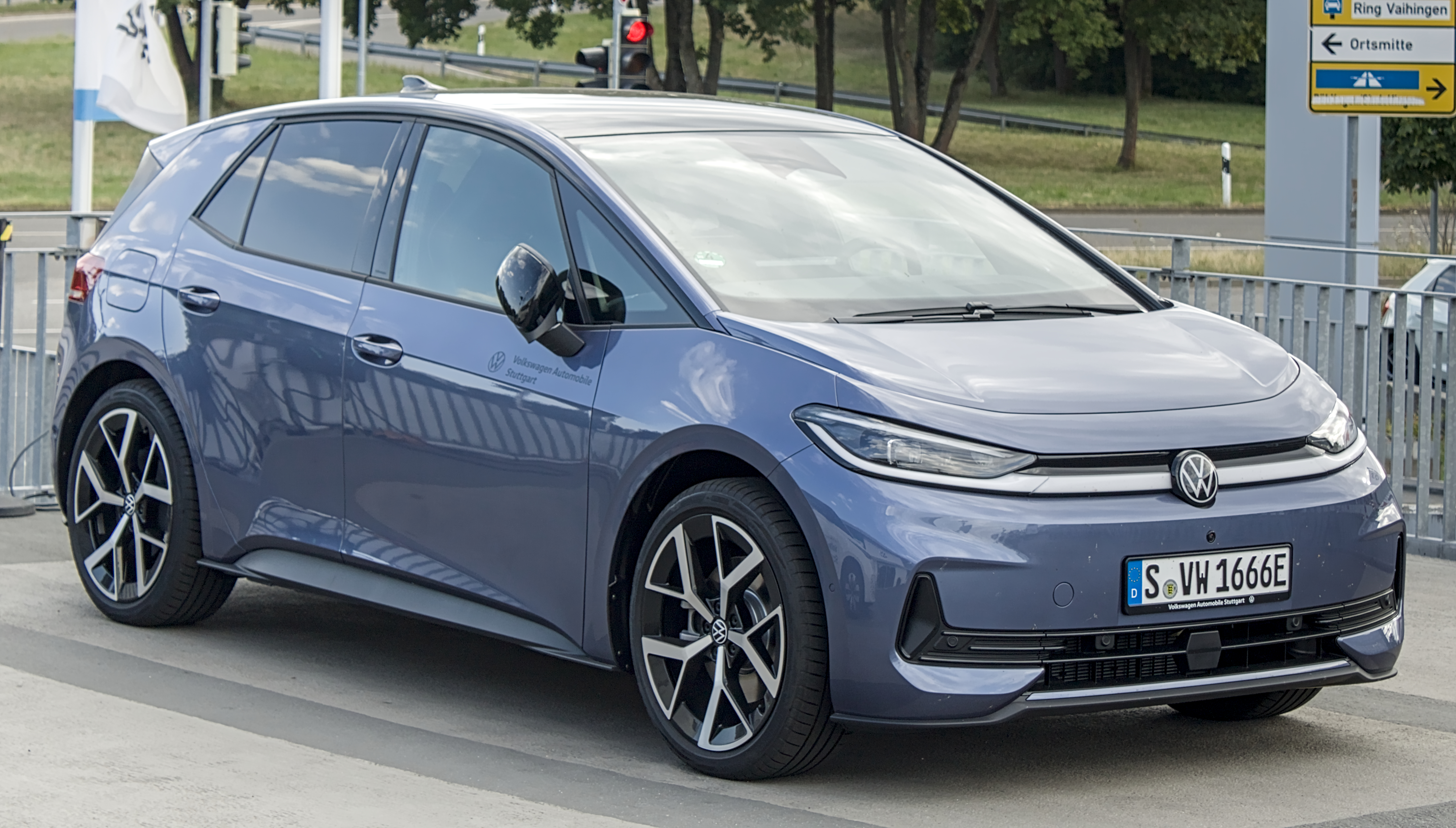
Volkswagen ID.3 Neo

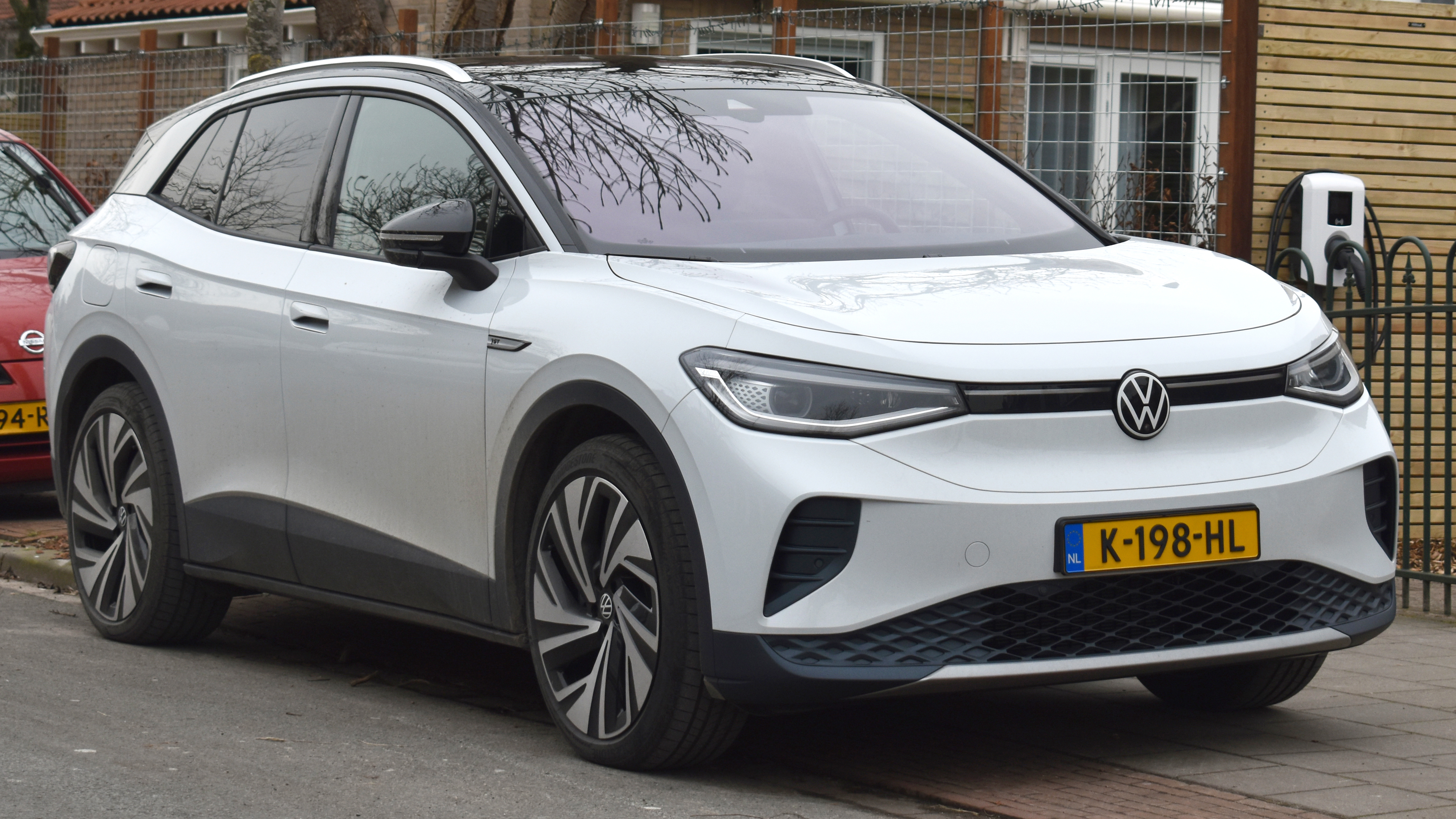
Volkswagen ID.4

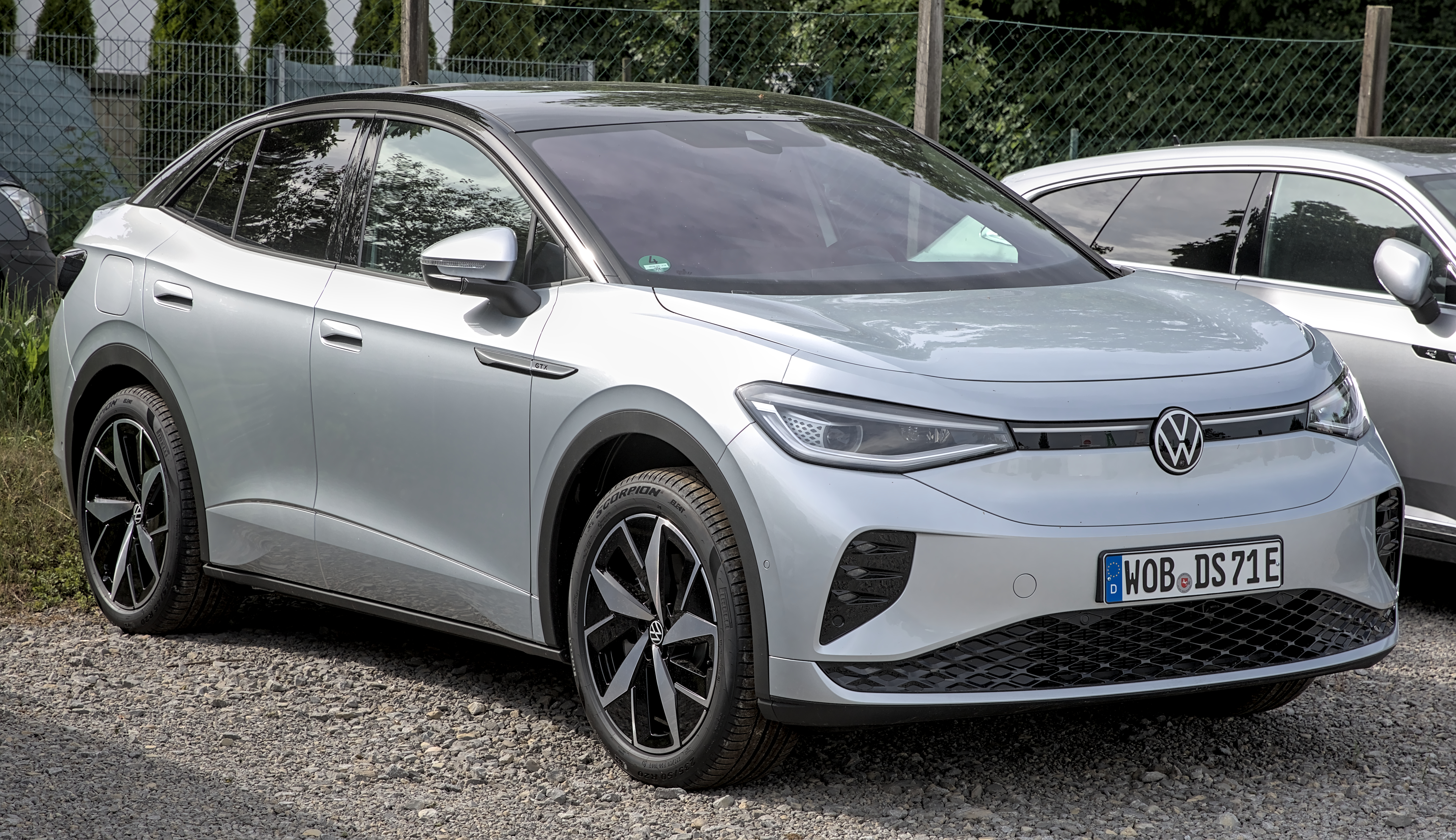
Volkswagen ID.5

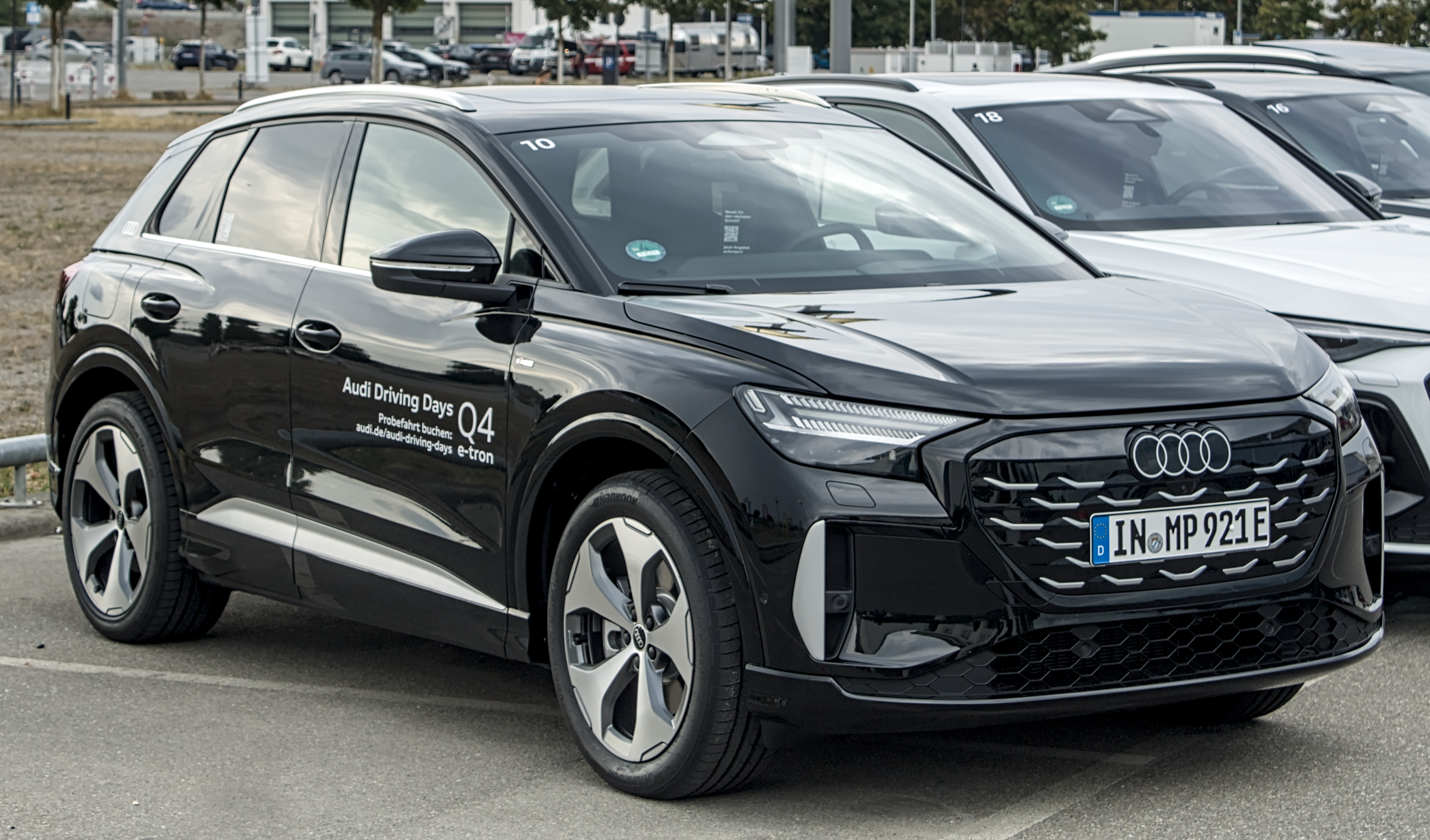
Audi Q4 e-tron

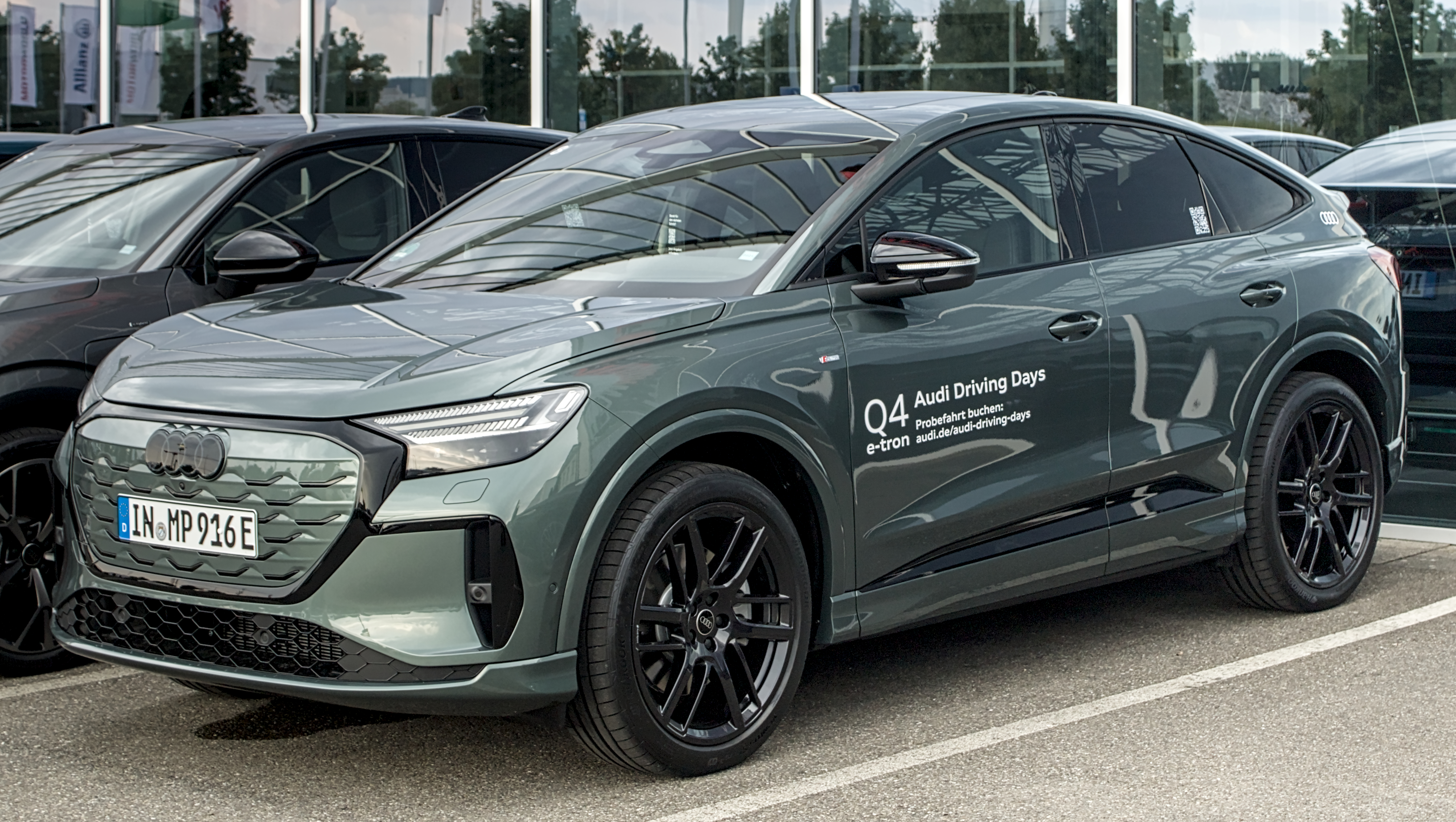
Audi Q4 Sportback e-tron

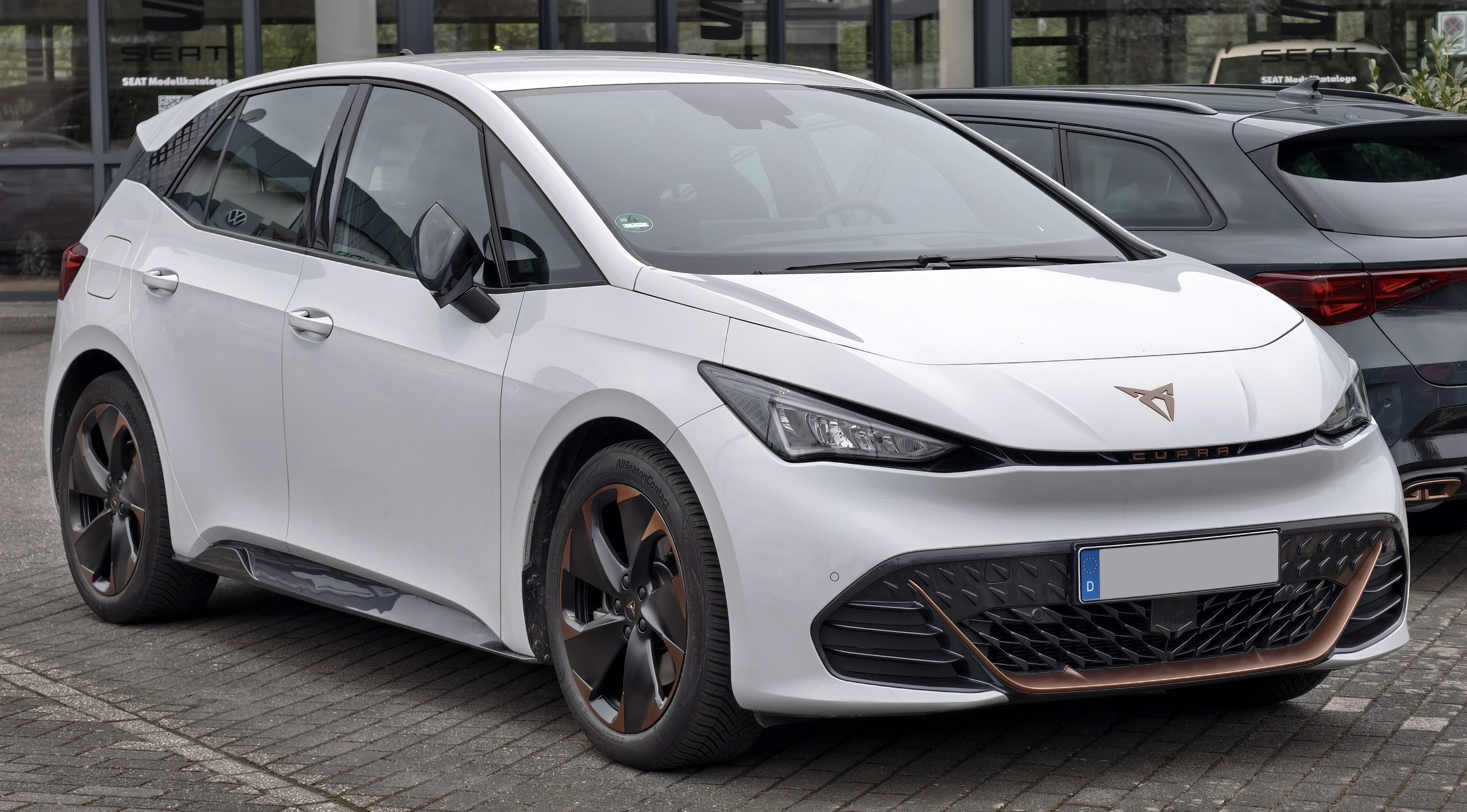
Cupra Born

== Sources ==
- Armitage, Jim (26 September 2026). "What the Humbling of Volkswagen Means for Germany". The Sunday Times.
