= Volkswagen ID. Aura T6 =

Battery electric mid-size crossover SUV

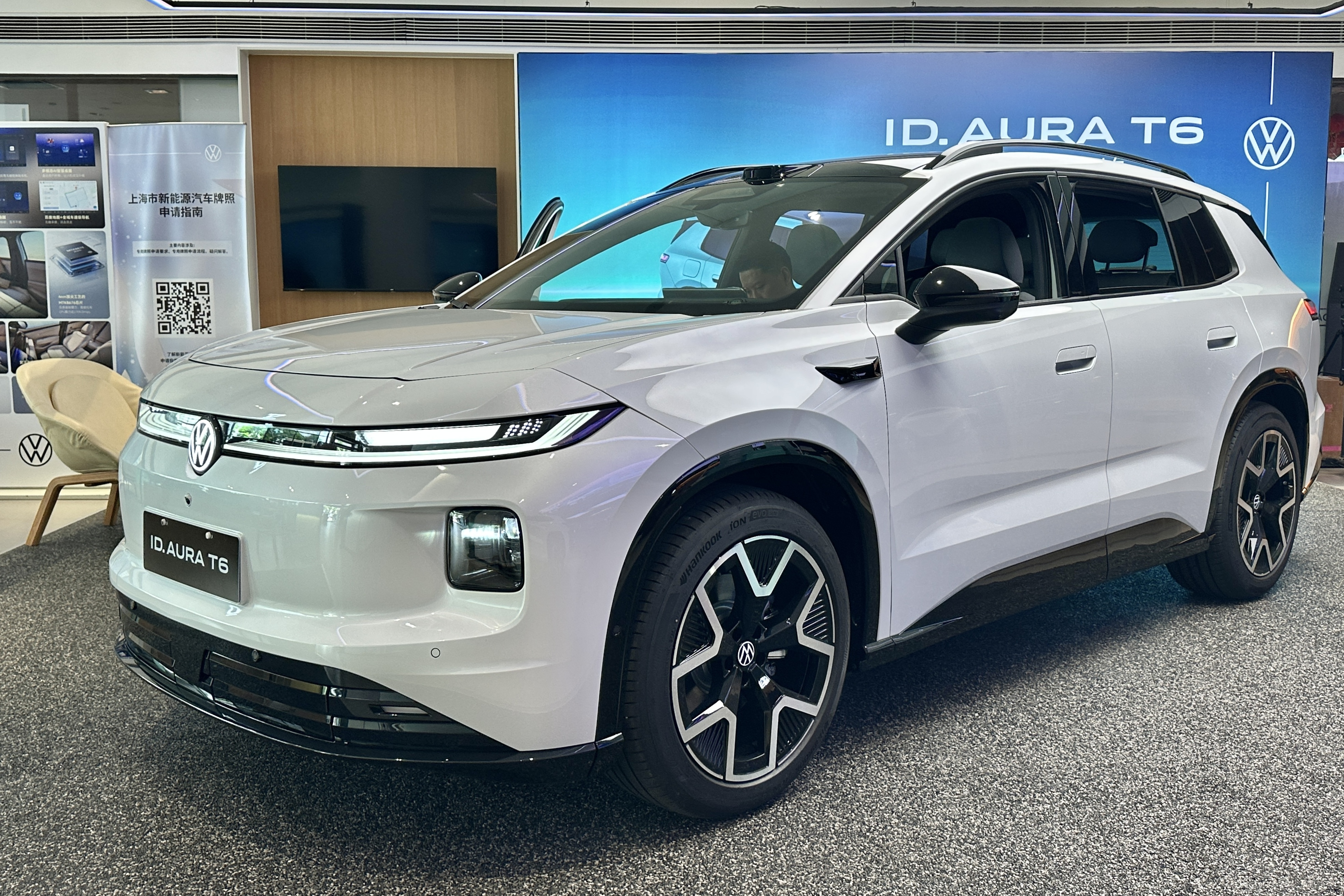
- Volkswagen ID. Aura T6

Overview
- Manufacturer: Volkswagen
- Production: 2026–present
- Assembly: China: Foshan (FAW-Volkswagen)

Body and chassis
- Class: Mid-size SUV
- Body style: 5-door crossover SUV
- Layout: Rear motor, rear-wheel drive
- Platform: Volkswagen Group MEB platform combined with China Electrical Architecture (CEA) 1.3
- Related: Volkswagen ID. Unyx 07; Volkswagen ID. Tiguan; Volkswagen ID.6

Powertrain
- Electric motor: 170 kW EGP PMSM
- Power output: 228 hp (170 kW; 231 PS)
- Battery: 59.9 kWh LFP Gotion; 77.5 kWh LFP CATL
- Electric range: 540–660 km (336–410 mi) (CLTC)

Dimensions
- Wheelbase: 2,836 mm (111.7 in)
- Length: 4,811 mm (189.4 in)
- Width: 1,879 mm (74.0 in)
- Height: 1,648 mm (64.9 in)
- Curb weight: 2,026–2,126 kg (4,467–4,687 lb)

The Volkswagen ID. Aura T6 (Chinese: 大众ID. AURA T6; pinyin: Dàzhòng ID. AURA T6) is a battery electric mid-size crossover SUV produced by Volkswagen under its FAW-Volkswagen joint venture. It is sold under Volkswagen's ID. Aura sub-brand.

== Overview ==
The ID. Aura T6 was first unveiled in the 2026 Beijing Auto Show on 21 April 2026 alongside the ID. Unyx 09 sedan. It was officially launched on 20 September.

It is built on the China Electronic Architecture (CEA) developed in close collaboration with XPeng, and features an intelligent driving assistance system developed by Carizon, a joint venture between Volkswagen's Cariad and Horizon Robotics, using a Robosense-supplied 192-line roof-mounted LiDAR and a Horizon Robotics' Journey 6H chip capable of 420 TOPS.

The exterior has a drag coefficient of 0.245 C_{d}. It uses a staggered wheel setup with 255 mm and 265 mm width front and rear tires, respectively. It has a turning radius of 4.75 m (15.6 ft).

The interior features a 10.25-inch instrument panel supplemented by a 25.8-inch AR-HUD along with a 15.6-inch 2.5K-resolution central infotainment touchscreen, all powered by a Mediatek MT8676 SoC. The front row seats have optional heating, cooling, and massaging functions, and the passenger seat has a 'queen seat' recline mode with footrest. It has an optional 7.1.4 surround sound 18-speaker sound system. The rear seats have access to magnetic mounting points on the front seatback along with an airline-style folding table. It has a 576 L (20.3 cu ft) rear cargo area which expands to 1,796 L (63.4 cu ft) with the rear seats folded down, and is supplemented with a 90-litre (3.2 cu ft) frunk.

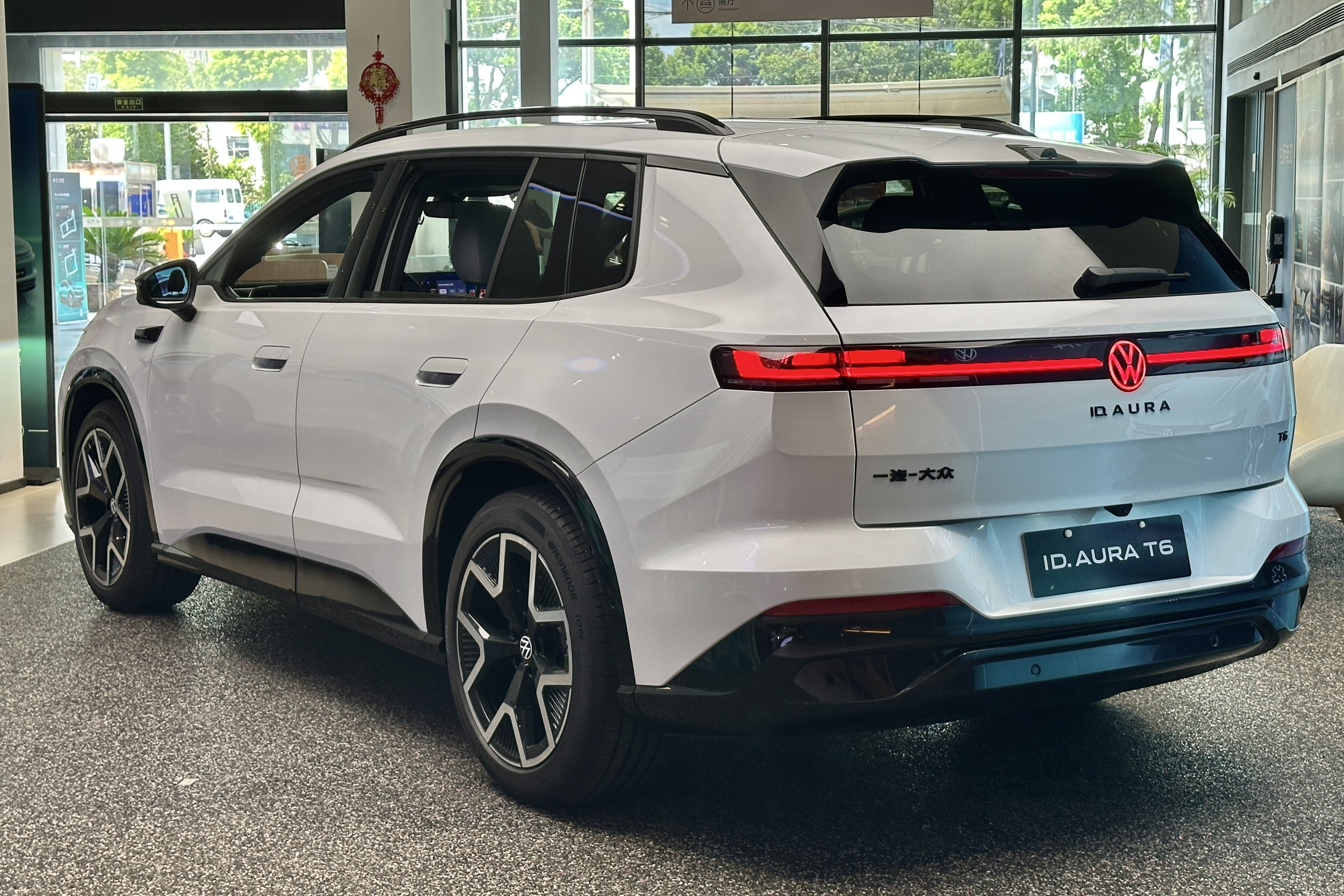
Rear view

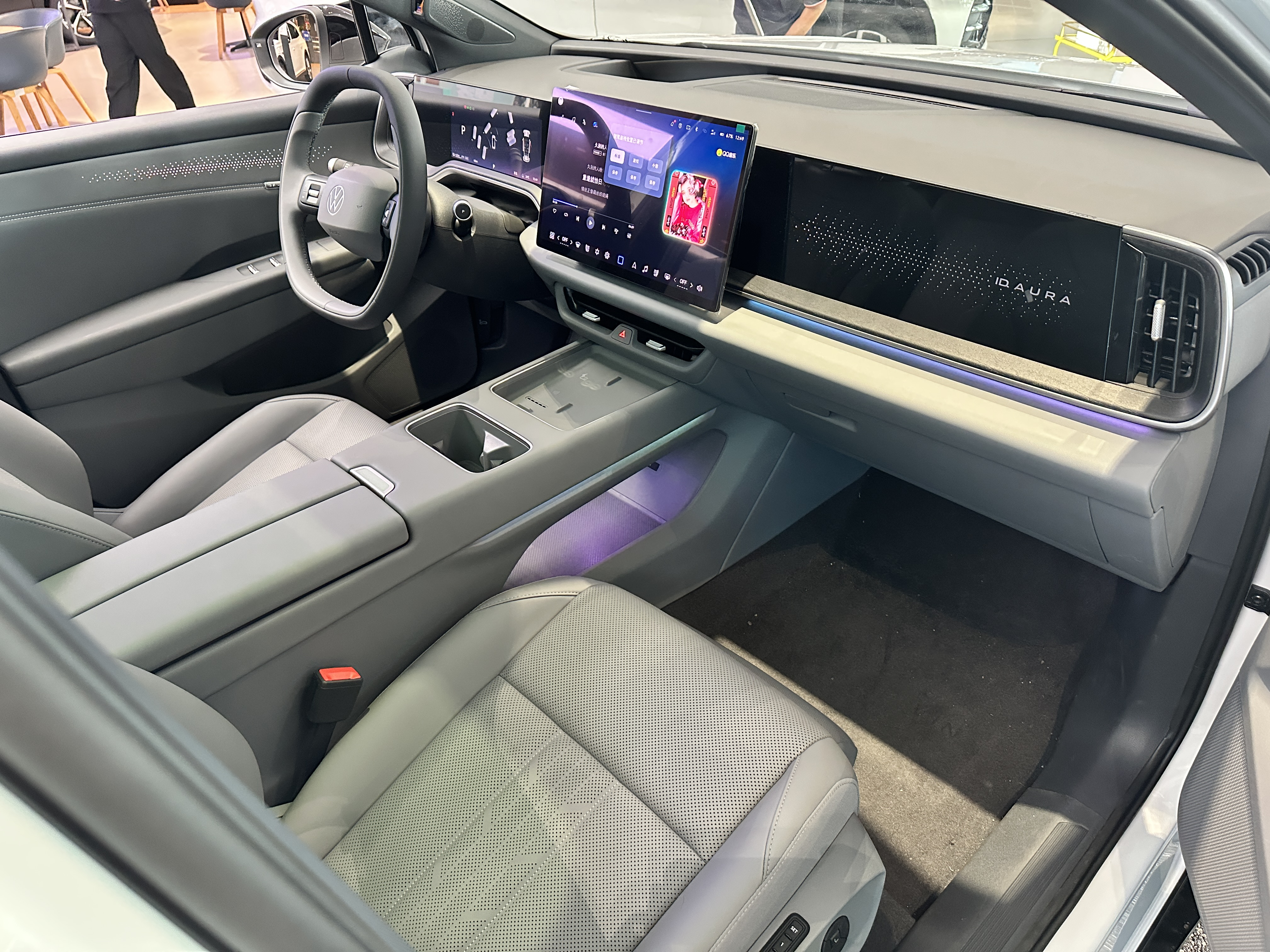
Interior

== Powertrain ==
All ID.Aura T6s come with a rear-mounted permanent magnet synchronous motor outputting 228 horsepower (170 kW; 231 PS) and 345 N⋅m (254 lb⋅ft) of torque. Base models are powered by a 59.9 kWh LFP battery pack using Gotion cells providing 540 kilometres (336 mi) of CLTC range and can be recharged from 30–80% in 24 minutes. Higher variants use a CATL-supplied 77.5 kWh LFP battery pack capable of 660 kilometres (410 mi) CLTC range and can charge 30–80% in 22 minutes with 400-volt class power electronics.

Specifications
Battery		Power	Torque	Range	30–80% charge time	0–100 km/h (62 mph) time	Top speed	Kerb weight
Type	Weight	Power	Torque	CLTC	30–80% charge time	0–100 km/h (62 mph) time	Top speed	Kerb weight
59.9 kWh LFP Gotion	441.5 kg (973 lb)	228 hp (170 kW; 231 PS)	345 N⋅m (254 lb⋅ft)	540 km (336 mi)	24 min	7.2 sec	180 km/h (112 mph)	2,026 kg (4,467 lb)
77.5 kWh LFP CATL	543 kg (1,197 lb)	228 hp (170 kW; 231 PS)	345 N⋅m (254 lb⋅ft)	660 km (410 mi)	22 min	7.4 sec	186 km/h (116 mph)	2,126 kg (4,687 lb)

== Sales ==
On 20 October 2026, FAW-Volkswagen announced that the ID.Aura T6 received 33,022 orders in its first month of sales, and said that over 90% were units equipped with LiDAR, and almost 80% of buyers were purchasing a Volkswagen for the first time.
