= XPeng =

Chinese car company

Guangzhou Xiaopeng Motors Technology Co., Ltd.
- Type: Public
- Traded as: NYSE: XPEV; SEHK: 9868
- Industry: Automotive; Aerospace; Humanoid robots
- Founded: 15 August 2014; 12 years ago
- Founder: He Xiaopeng; Xia Heng; He Tao; Yang Chunlei
- Headquarters: Guangzhou, Guangdong, China
- Key people: Wang Fengying (president); He Xiaopeng (chairman); Brian Gu Hongdi (vice chairman)
- Products: Battery electric vehicles (BEVs), smart electric cars
- Production output: ▲429,445 vehicles (2025)
- Revenue: ▲CN¥76.72 billion (2025)
- Operating income: ▲ −CN¥2.77 billion (2025)
- Net income: ▲ −CN¥1.14 billion (2025)
- Total assets: ▲CN¥103.16 billion (2025)
- Total equity: ▼CN¥30.37 billion (2025)
- Owner: He Xiaopeng (WVR beneficiary and controlling shareholder); Volkswagen Group (strategic shareholder); BlackRock (5.3% long position in Class A shares); (As of 31 December 2025)
- Number of employees: ▲19,884 (As of 31 December 2025)
- Subsidiaries: AeroHT

Chinese name
- Simplified Chinese: 广州小鹏汽车科技有限公司
- Traditional Chinese: 廣州小鵬汽車科技有限公司
Transcriptions
Standard Mandarin
- Hanyu Pinyin: Guǎngzhōu Xiǎopéng Qìchē Kējì Yǒuxiàn Gōngsī
Yue: Cantonese
- Jyutping: Gwong2 Zau1 Siu2 Paang4 Hei3 Ce1 Fo1 Gei6 Jau5 Haan6 Gung1 Si1
- Website: xpeng.com

Guangzhou Xiaopeng Motors Technology Co., Ltd., trading as XPeng Motors (Chinese: 小鹏汽车; pinyin: Xiǎopéng Qìchē), commonly known as XPeng, is a Chinese electric vehicle manufacturer. The company is headquartered in Guangzhou, Guangdong, with offices in Mountain View, California, United States and Munich, Germany. XPeng stock is publicly traded on the New York Stock Exchange and the Hong Kong Stock Exchange. The company describes itself as a global AI mobility technology company and develops in-house technologies including full-stack advanced driver-assistance systems, an in-car intelligent operating system, powertrain systems and vehicle electronic/electrical architecture.

== History ==
XPeng showrooms

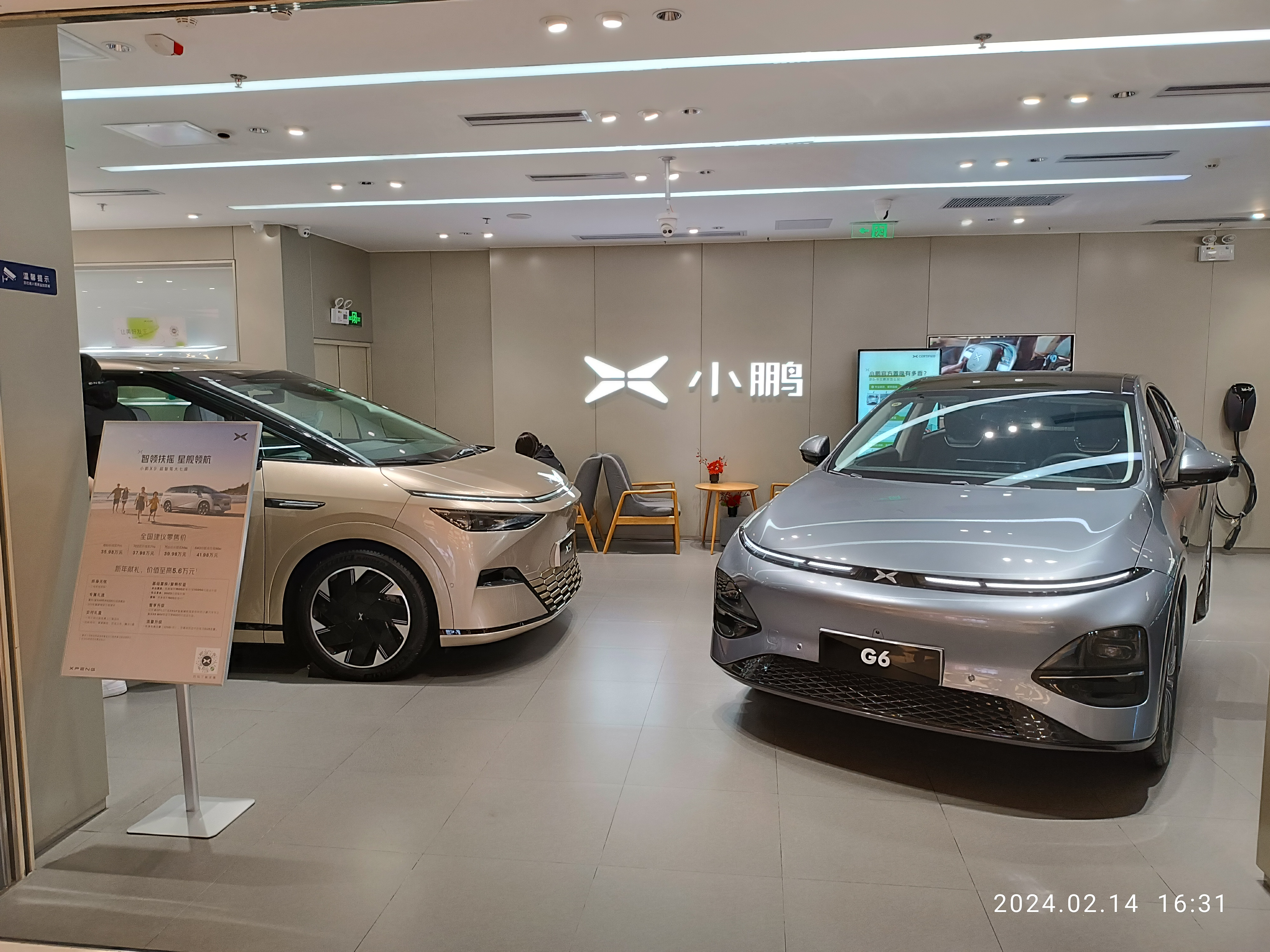
In Shenzhen, Guangdong

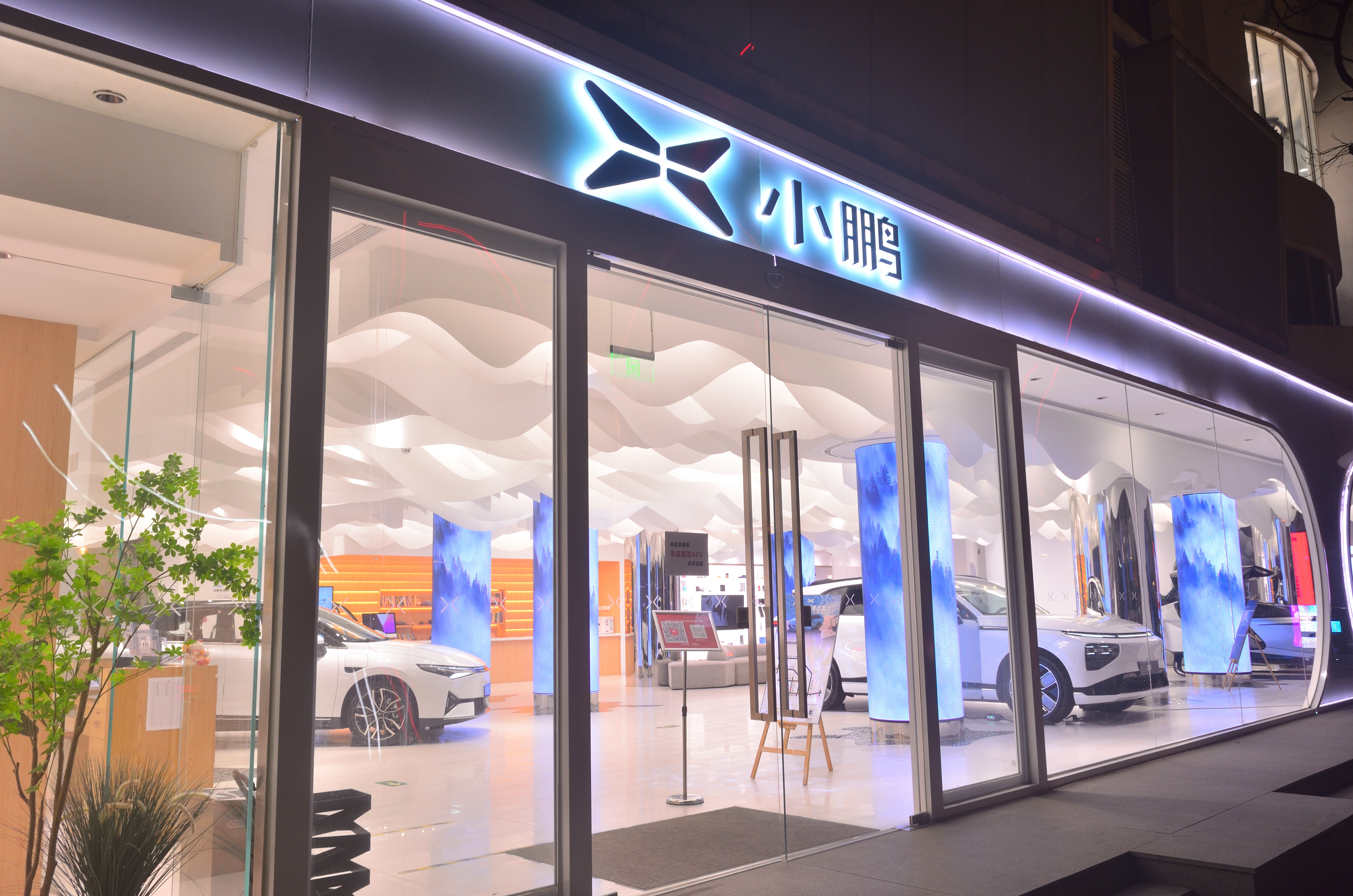
In Taikoo Li Sanlitun shopping center in Beijing, China

XPeng was co-founded in August 2014 by Xia Heng (Henry Xia) and He Tao, former senior executives at GAC Group with expertise in automotive technology and research and development. Initial backers included: the founder of UCWeb and former Alibaba executive He Xiaopeng, namesake and current Chairman of XPeng, and Lei Jun, the founder of Xiaomi. Prominent Chinese and international investors included Alibaba, Foxconn and IDG Capital. A further funding round in 2018 saw Alibaba's vice president Joseph Tsai join the corporate board of XPeng.

XPeng's subsidiary in the United States, XMotors.ai held a permit for testing self-driving cars from the California Department of Motor Vehicles starting in September 2018. The permit was revoked in February 2020 due to XPeng's failure to submit a disengagement report. XPeng Motors then received a renewed Autonomous Vehicles Testing Permit from the California Department of Motor Vehicles in March 2020.

XPeng started production of its first model, the XPeng G3 SUV, in November 2018. It launched the G3 in December 2018 at the 2018 Consumer Electronics Show in Las Vegas.

Its second model, the P7, a four-door electric sedan, premiered in April 2019 at the 2019 Auto Shanghai show and started deliveries to customers in June 2020.

In May 2019, XPeng launched a vehicle for hire company with its own vehicles to serve Guangzhou.

In November 2019, XPeng raised US$400 million in a third fundraising round, which saw Xiaomi join as a strategic investor of XPeng. In July 2020, XPeng raised US$500 million from a group of investors including Aspex, Coatue, Hillhouse Capital and Sequoia Capital China. In August 2020, XPeng raised an additional US$400 million from a group of investors including Alibaba, Qatar Investment Authority and Abu Dhabi's sovereign wealth fund Mubadala. On 27 August 2020, XPeng raised US$1.5 billion with an IPO on the New York Stock Exchange, where its shares climbed more than 40% on the first day of trading. In March 2021, the company received a US$76.9 million funding from Guangdong Yuecai Investment Holdings Co. As of May 2021, 23% of XPeng shares are owned by He Xiaopeng, and 12% by Alibaba Group.

In the third quarter of 2021, revenue for XPeng rose over 500% compared to the year before. It had also increased its R&D team by about a third since the year before.

In 2021, for the first time, XPeng started exporting its flagship P7 sedan. Its first international market was Norway, starting in August. In August 2021, the company's P5 subcompact sedan became able to read traffic lights. In September 2021, XPeng brought its P5 to market. It is the first production car to be equipped with lidar sensors for advanced driver-assistance systems (ADAS).

In October 2021, XPeng's subsidiary HT Aero announced $500 million in funding and the design for a flying car with a planned launch in 2024.

In April 2023, XPeng unveiled the XPeng G6 at the 2023 Shanghai Auto Show.

On 21 June 2023, XPeng announced a partnership with ACCESS Europe in the field of in-car infotainment systems.

In August 2023, it was announced XPeng had agreed to acquire the autonomous driving technology unit of the Beijing-headquartered vehicle for hire company, DiDi, in exchange for $744 million worth of shares.

In March 2025, He Xiaopeng, chairman of Xpeng Motors, announced that the first mass production of the split flying car land aircraft carrier is expected to be achieved in 2026.

=== 2025–2026 performance and global expansion ===
XPeng delivered 429,445 vehicles in 2025, an increase of 126% over the previous year, including 45,008 vehicles in overseas markets, a 96% year-over-year increase. By the end of 2025, the company said its global footprint had expanded to 60 countries and regions. In the fourth quarter of 2025, XPeng recorded a positive quarterly net profit for the first time, reporting RMB0.38 billion in net profit, while full-year revenue reached RMB76.72 billion and full-year gross margin reached 18.9%.

In the first quarter of 2026, XPeng delivered 62,682 vehicles and reported total revenue of RMB13.03 billion, gross margin of 20.6%, vehicle margin of 12.1% and a net loss of RMB1.78 billion. As of 31 March 2026, its physical sales network had 733 stores covering 256 cities and its self-operated charging network had 3,455 stations, including 2,398 ultra-fast charging stations. In April and May 2026, the company reported monthly deliveries of 31,011 and 32,158 vehicles, respectively.

XPeng also continued its European expansion. In September 2024, it announced a partnership with the Salvador Caetano Group to launch operations in Spain and Portugal with the G6, G9 and P7 as the initial model line-up. In February 2025, the company announced its official entry into the United Kingdom through International Motors Ltd, with the right-hand-drive G6 offered from £39,990 and deliveries planned from March 2025.

=== Partnership with Volkswagen ===
On 26 July 2023, the Volkswagen Group announced its investment of $700 million in XPeng for purchasing 4.99% stake of the company. The VW Group will collaborate with XPeng to develop two VW brand electric models for the mid-size segment in the Chinese market in 2026.

In February 2024, XPeng and Volkswagen Group signed a technology cooperation and joint development agreement on platform and software. Through joint procurement and the joint development of the vehicle design and engineering, the product development cycle will be shortened by more than 30%. Volkswagen (China) Technology Co., Ltd. (VCTC) in Hefei is responsible for this cooperation.

In April 2024, XPeng and Volkswagen Group signed an electronic and electrical architecture ("E/E Architecture") technology strategic cooperation framework agreement. XPeng and Volkswagen Group will jointly develop a new architecture based on XPeng's latest electronic and electrical architecture, which will be applied to the CMP platform developed by Volkswagen for the Chinese market, and mass production will begin in 2026.

In July 2024, XPeng and Volkswagen announced project houses in Guangzhou and Hefei to accelerate the development of the new E/E architecture; Reuters reported that the architecture was planned to equip Volkswagen-branded electric vehicles in China from 2026.

In January 2025, Xpeng reached strategic cooperation agreements with Volkswagen China and BP Pulse, and both parties will open their own charging networks in mainland China to each other; Xpeng also plans to build a joint-branded ultra-fast charging station with Volkswagen.

In August 2025, XPeng released its first-half financial report, revealing that the company generated 1.72 billion RMB profit in technology licensing fees from Volkswagen.

In August 2025, XPeng and Volkswagen Group signed an Agreement on Expanding E/E Architecture Technical Collaboration ("Expanded Technical Collaboration"). The signing of this agreement marks that the E/E Architecture will be not only integrated into Volkswagen's electric vehicle platforms, but also deployed across its ICE and PHEV platforms in China, thereby significantly expanding the strategic technical collaboration to broader markets.

In November 2025, Xpeng announced a new driver-assist system designed for navigating narrow roads, which they say will be rolled out by the first quarter of 2026. The system is claimed to be able to navigate cars smoothly through the narrow streets and will be opened to other car makers, with Volkswagen being its first client.

== Technology ==
=== Autonomous driving (XPILOT) ===
XPeng uses a combination of lidar, radar, and a camera for driver aid. The lidar system uses laser light to recreate a 3D space by measuring the distance between itself and objects by measuring the time it takes for the laser light to bounce back. Xinzhou Wu stated "Lidar will provide the 3D drivable space and precise depth estimation to small moving obstacles even like kids and pets, and obviously, other pedestrians and the motorbikes which are a nightmare for anybody who's working on driving", The radar will provide the vehicles with the ability to detect the speed and location of an object. The camera will provide the vehicle with basic semantic information as stated by Xinzhou Wu. XPeng introduced their first vehicle equipped with LiDAR in 2021 with the P5. In late 2024, XPeng released their first vehicle equipped with XPILOT that uses a new 'vision-only' sensor suite lacking a LiDAR sensor with the P7+, which instead relies on 4D mmWave radars which can measure altitude and LOFIC camera sensors which can better handle glare. In 2025, models previously equipped with LiDARs were refreshed with the new system and had their LiDAR systems removed.

=== VLA ===
At its 2025 AI Day, XPeng described a strategic shift toward becoming a "global embodied intelligence company" and introduced XPeng VLA 2.0, Robotaxi, the IRON humanoid robot and updates to XPeng AeroHT's Land Aircraft Carrier flying vehicle program.

In March 2026, XPeng launched its VLA 2.0 intelligent driving system. In April the company released its first VLA 2.0 Intelligent Driving Report. In May, XPeng began mass production of its first robotaxi, based on the GX platform, completing >2000 test rides by October. In August, the robotics unit raised over $900 million (>$6.3 billion post-money valuation led by IDG Capital, with Tencent and Alibaba).

In September XPeng announced version 6.3.0 with 300% latency improvement. Modules include:

- X-Foresight predicts outcomes 6 seconds ahead.
- Flow-Matching assigns probabilities to multiple paths and selects the best outcome.
- HybridViT streamlines processing.
- Master Agent uses an “Omni multimodal model” to support voice control of the vehicle.

The 4-chip system uses one 750TOPS chip for driving, one for expanding capabilities, one for voice control and communication and one for redundancy. One Turing chip offers more than the total computing power of Tesla HW4.

=== Battery ===
Initially, XPeng's batteries were developed by China's largest battery manufacturer, Contemporary Amperex Technology (CATL).

XPeng has moved to offering LFP batteries options in addition to the original NMC battery options, which do not use expensive cobalt. In early 2021, "Xpeng announces they were launching new versions of the P7 sedan and G3 SUV with LFP batteries. The new versions with lithium iron phosphate cells will be available for the rear-wheel-drive P7 sports sedan first."

In 2025, XPeng updated most of their vehicles to have battery options capable of 5C charge rates, which are capable of charging from 10–80% in approximately 12 minutes.

==== Charging network, fast charging stations ====
XPeng offers free lifetime charging similar to what Tesla has offered their customers around the world. XPeng's charging network has expanded to over 1,000 charging stations within China, and customers have access to another 200,000 third party stations positioned in major cities. XPeng intends to construct more than 50 S4 sites in large cities by the end of 2022, with an additional 20 sites each in Beijing, Shanghai, and Guangzhou, with Shenzhen following in 2023. By 2025, Xpeng hopes to have 2,000 super-fast charging stations.

=== IRON ===
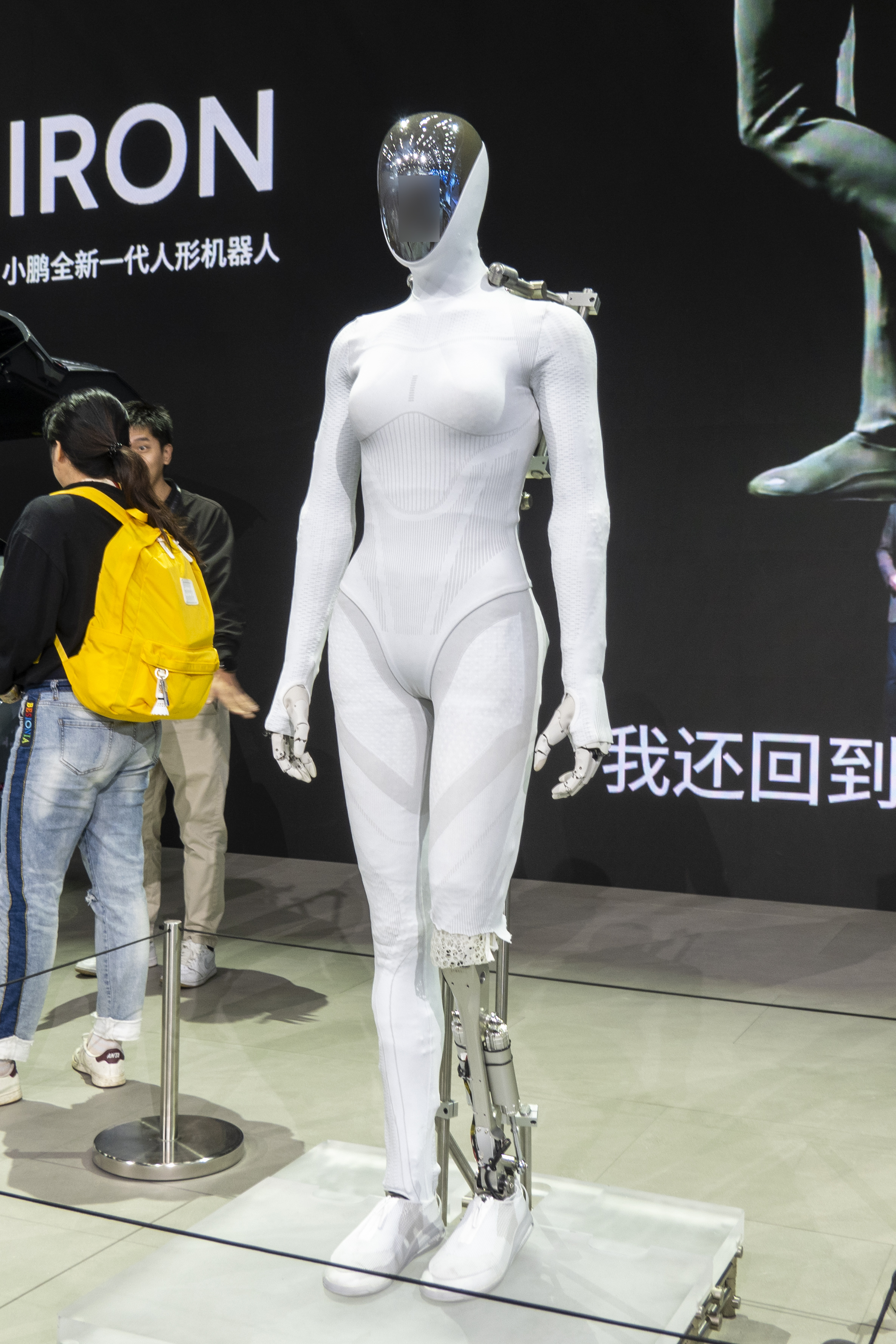
XPeng Iron Robot

On 8 November 2024, XPeng unveiled its first humanoid robot, IRON at its 2024 AI Day event. IRON expresses 76 degrees of freedom across the body (21 per hand), houses three Turing AI chips, and is 1.73–1.78 m tall, weighing 65–70 kg. Prototypes work on XPeng's production lines and in stores.

In June 2026, Reuters reported that He Xiaopeng would personally lead XPeng's robotics division. In September, XPeng commissioned an IRON production line. The company claimed that more than 80% of processes were automated. Deliveries are scheduled for 1H27.

=== Turing AI chip ===
XPeng began recruiting a chip design team in 2020. In 2022, XPeng contracted Socionext to handle SoC integration efforts. XPeng announced that the chip taped-out in August 2024.

In June 2025, XPeng launched its Turing chip for the G7. It powers AI models for ADAS functions and to power in-cabin AI assistants. Each chip has 40 Cortex-A78AE cores for its CPU, two NPUs, and 64 GB of LPDDR5x-8533 RAM on a 256-bit bus for 273 GB/s of bandwidth. It also has two ISPs, dedicated to AI perception and image synthesis respectively. This outputs 750 TOPS of sparse compute. XPeng says that it can run 30B-parameter models.

XPeng supplies Turing chips for some Chinese-market Volkswagen models launching in 2026.

== Production ==
XPeng's 2025 annual report states that its Smart EVs and NEVs are mainly manufactured at its plants in Zhaoqing and Guangzhou, Guangdong province. Xpeng manufactures most of its cars in a wholly owned factory in Zhaoqing. As of 2025, other production plants are under construction in Wuhan and Guangzhou. Cars for the European market are manufactured in Graz, Austria, in partnership with Magna Steyr.

== Overseas markets ==
=== Europe ===
In late December 2020, XPeng stated it would be delivering the G3 SUV to Norway. "Our launch in Europe comes just as consumers are shifting in increasingly large numbers to more sustainable personal transport, and at a tipping point where governments around the world are stepping up their zero-emission efforts", said He. XPeng has also decided that it would be selling its P7 EV sedan to the European market this year.

As of 2021, XPeng has sold 211 G3 SUVs in Norway. XPeng stated it will be tough to break into the European auto market but with policies in Europe further encouraging the purchase of EV cars, XPeng will seek to find those consumers. Without infrastructure to build XPeng vehicles, it will also add to the challenge of breaking into the European auto market.

At IAA Mobility 2023 in Munich, XPeng announced its expansion to the German and market starting 2024 and plans to enter further European markets later.

In 2025, at the Milan Design Week, sales of the G6 and G9 models in Italy were announced.

=== Hong Kong ===
On 7 July 2021, XPeng debuted on the Hong Kong Stock Exchange. The choice to bring the company to the exchange before a second listing could result in the company taking a better position in the city's share indexes. As a dual-primary listing, XPeng will be eligible for Stock Connect, an investment channel facilitating trade between Hong Kong and mainland China. With its listing in Hong Kong, XPeng became the first US-listed Chinese firm with dual primary listing. The move will as well provide some security for the company in the event of being kicked off the US market.

=== Singapore ===
XPeng launched the G6 in Singapore in July 2024, and opened its first showroom in November. According to XPeng, the G6 was one of the three best-selling fully-electric SUV models in the city-state, and had approximately the same monthly sales figures as rival manufacturer Tesla.

=== Malaysia ===
XPeng launched the G6 in Malaysia on 27 August 2024.

XPeng opened its first dealership in Malaysia at Glenmarie, Kuala Lumpur, Malaysia on 27 August 2024. New Xpeng dealerships will be opened in Penang, Johor, Melaka and Negeri Sembilan by October 2024.

=== Indonesia ===
XPeng had its brand launch in Indonesia in January 2025. The brand is distributed by local electronics distributor Erajaya Group. In July 2025, XPeng started its first knock-down assembly operations in Indonesia, at a facility owned by Handal Indonesia Motor in Purwakarta, West Java. The first model assembled in the country is the XPeng X9.

=== Australia ===
Xpeng vehicles were first sold in Australia in late 2024 through local third-party distributor, TrueEV. In 2026, Xpeng announced the launch of its own dealership network in the country after TrueEV entered receivership and launched litigation against Xpeng in March 2026.

== Products ==
=== Current vehicles ===
Image	Name	Introduced	Generation	Notes
Sedan
	Mona M03	2024	First	Compact sedan, BEV
	P7	2020	Second	Mid-size sedan, BEV
	P7+	2024	First	Full-size sedan, BEV/EREV
SUV
	Mona L03 / L03	2026	First	Compact coupe SUV, BEV/EREV
	G6	2023	First	Mid-size SUV, BEV/EREV
	G7	2025	First	Mid-size coupe SUV, BEV/EREV
	Mona L05	2026	First	Mid-size coupe SUV, BEV/EREV
	G9	2021	First	Mid-size SUV, BEV
	G9L	2026	First	Full-size SUV, BEV/EREV
	GX	2026	First	Full-size SUV, BEV/EREV
MPV
	X9	2023	First	Full-size MPV, BEV/EREV

=== Upcoming vehicles ===
- Mona codenamed D11T: Station wagon
- Mona codenamed D11: Subcompact SUV

=== Discontinued vehicles ===
Image	Name	Production period	Generation	Notes
Sedan
	P5	2021–2024	First	Compact sedan, BEV
SUV
	G3	2018–2023	First	Compact SUV, BEV

== Subsidiary ==
=== XPeng AeroHT ===
AeroHT was originally a startup founded in Dongguan, Guangdong, in 2013, dedicated to the research, development, and manufacture of flying cars. In 2020, XPeng invested in the company and renamed it to XPeng AeroHT. The company has released the XPeng Voyager X1 and XPeng Voyager X2 electric vertical take-off and landing (eVTOL) aircraft. In 2024, it released an eVTOL vehicle carrier named "Land Carrier", a range-extended electric 6x6 eVTOL carrier van.

==== Products ====
- XPeng Voyager X2, eVTOL multicopter
- XPeng Voyager X1, eVTOL multicopter
- "Land Carrier" (to commence), full-size 6x6 eVTOL carrier van, PHEV(EREV)
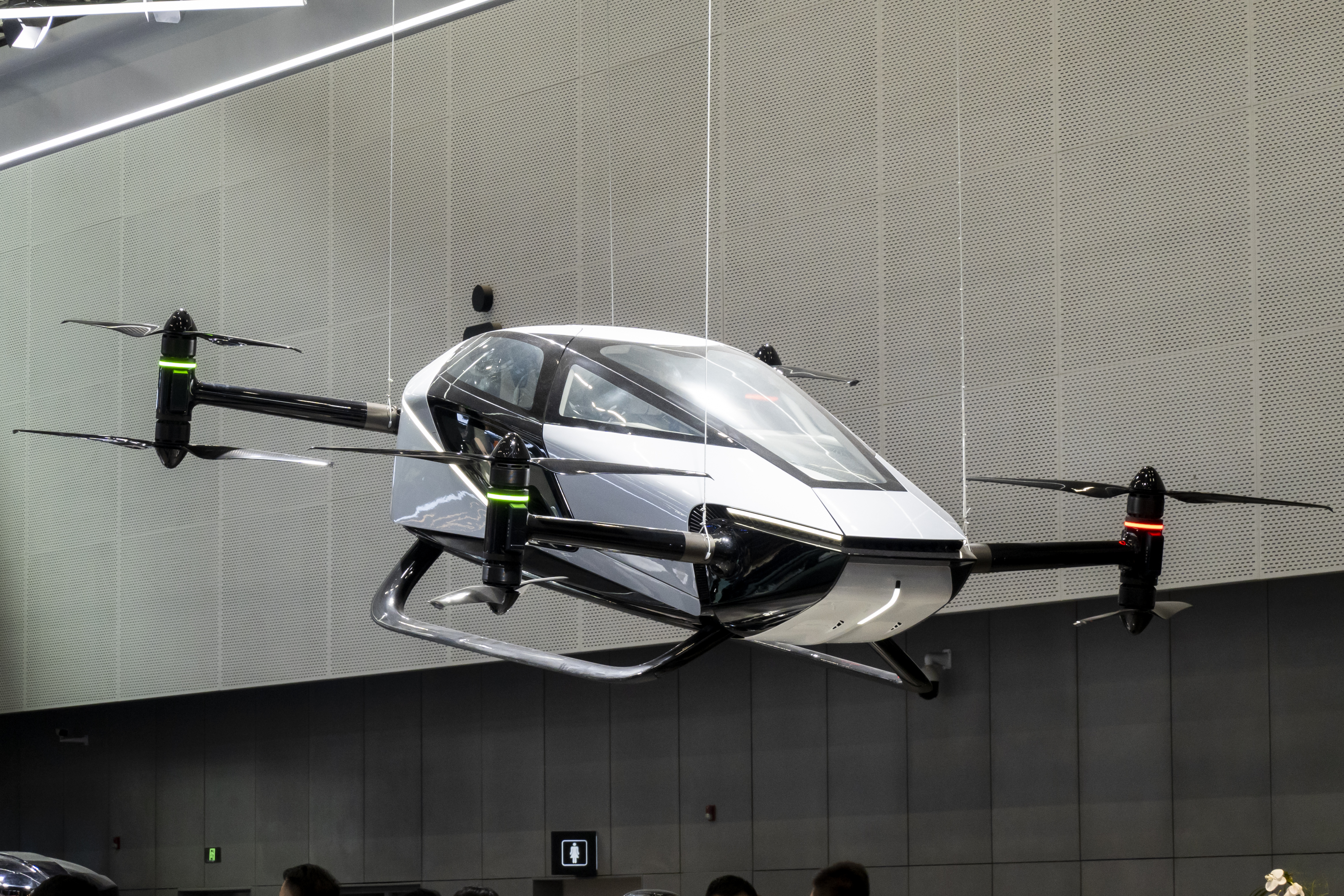
XPeng Voyager X2

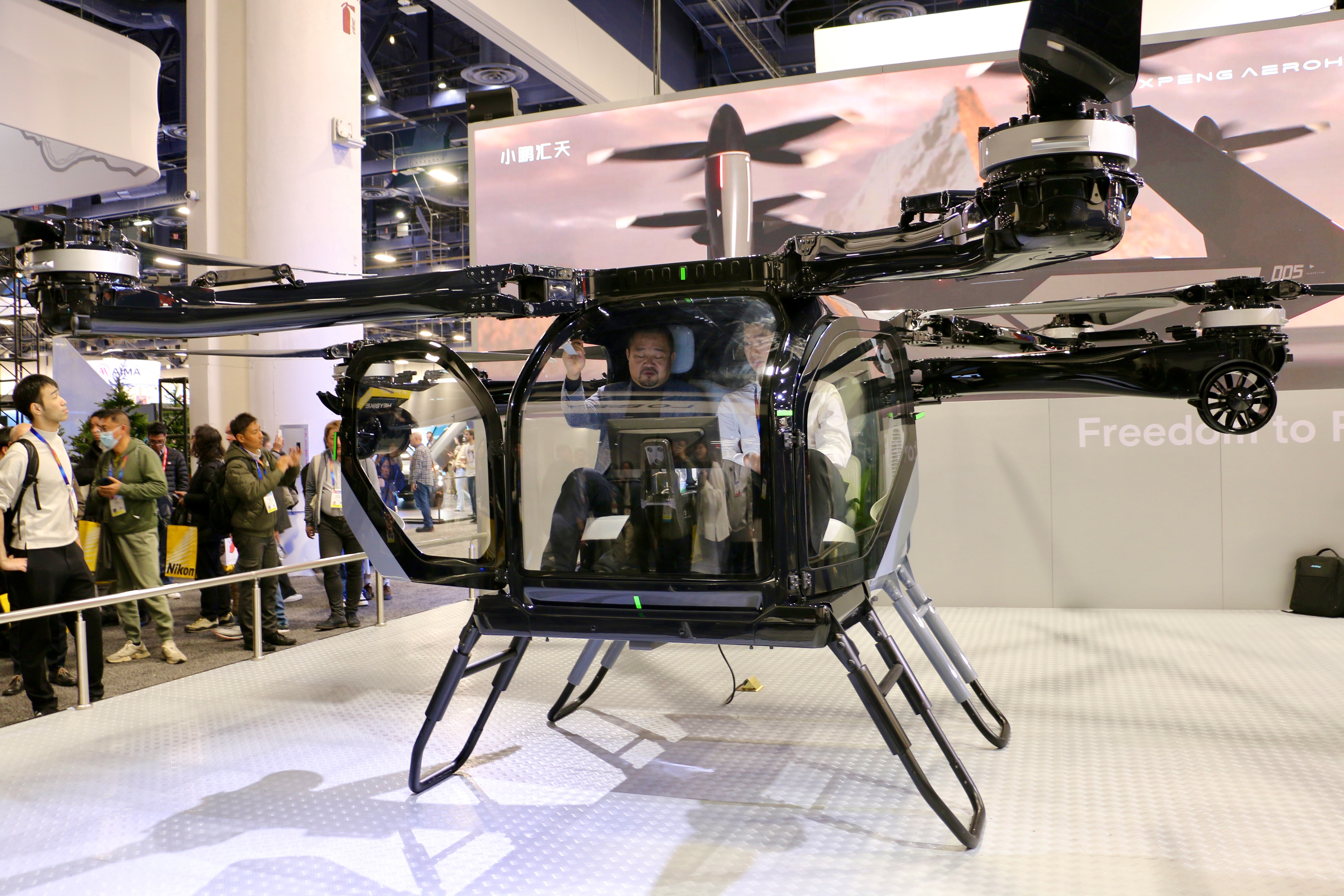
"Modular flying car" at CES 2025

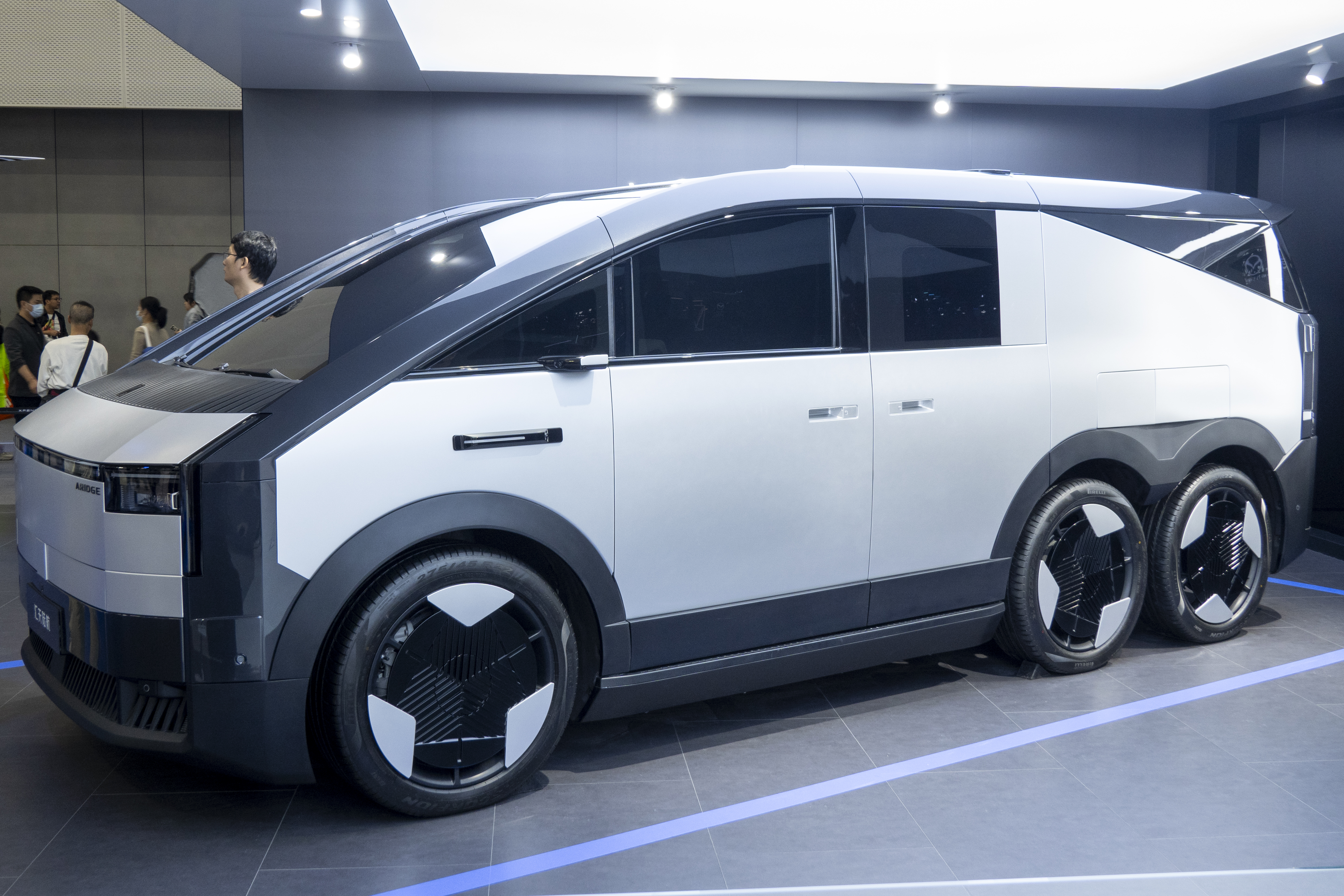
Land Carrier

== Sales ==
XPeng sales data
Year	Sales
2018	482
2019	16,608
2020	27,041
2021	98,155
2022	120,757
2023	141,601
2024	190,068
2025	429,445

XPeng reported that 45,008 of its 2025 deliveries were in overseas markets, representing about 10.5% of total annual deliveries and a 96% year-over-year increase. The company delivered 62,682 vehicles in the first quarter of 2026, followed by 31,011 in April and 32,158 in May.

== Sustainability ==
XPeng publishes environmental, social and governance reports through its investor relations and ESG pages. In April 2026, the company published its 2025 ESG report, stating that vehicles produced by XPeng in 2025 were expected to reduce greenhouse gas emissions by more than 6 million tons over their lifecycles compared with conventional cars. The report also stated that seven XPeng affiliates had obtained ISO 9001 quality system certification.

== Controversy ==
=== Allegations of intellectual property theft ===
In July 2018, the United States Department of Justice charged an ex-Apple employee for stealing the trade secrets of Apple's autonomous car project in an attempt to get a job at XPeng. In August 2022, the former Apple engineer, Xiaolang Zhang, pleaded guilty to trade secret theft in federal court. XPeng's 2025 annual report stated that the alleged theft occurred before Zhang was employed by the company, that XPeng had been subpoenaed to produce documents, and that the company considered itself unaffected by Zhang's final sentencing.

In March 2019, Tesla sued Cao Guangzhi, a former Tesla employee, accusing him of stealing its Autopilot source code and bringing them to XPeng. Cao rejected the accusation of IP theft, but later said he had uploaded Tesla's source code to his iCloud prior to leaving Tesla. In response to Tesla's accusations, XPeng launched an internal investigation. In November 2020, XPeng provided a copy of its source code to a neutral third party to compare to Tesla's to prove nothing was copied. Neither XPeng or any subsidiaries were parties to Tesla's original lawsuit. A court-appointed neutral third party concluded XPeng's code did not use Tesla's IP after comparing source code as provided by the companies. Tesla and Cao moved to settle soon after this was established.

=== Illegal data collection ===
In December 2021, XPeng was fined for the illegal collection of the facial data of 430,000 visitors of its stores. The fine was 100,000 yuan ($15,716).

== See also ==
- Automobile manufacturers and brands of China
- List of automobile manufacturers of China
- Automotive industry in China
- New energy vehicles in China
- Nio Inc.
- Li Auto
- Leapmotor
- Harmony Intelligent Mobility Alliance
- Xiaomi Auto
