= XPeng G9L =

Battery electric and range-extended full-size SUV

Overview
- Manufacturer: XPeng
- Model code: G02
- Production: 2026–present
- Assembly: China: Guangzhou; Austria: Graz (Magna Steyr); Indonesia: Purwakarta, West Java (HIM)

Body and chassis
- Class: Full-size SUV (E)
- Body style: 5-door SUV
- Layout: Battery electric: Rear-motor, rear-wheel-drive; Dual-motor, all-wheel-drive; Range-extended EV: Front-engine, rear-motor, rear-wheel-drive; Front-engine, dual-motor, all-wheel-drive
- Related: XPeng GX

Powertrain
- Engine: Gasoline range extender: 1.5 L DAM15NTE turbo I4
- Electric motor: XPeng YS230XY01G01X (AWD, front); Luxshare TZ230XY01G01X (rear)
- Power output: 270 kW (362 hp; 367 PS) (RWD EV); 430 kW (577 hp; 585 PS) (AWD EV); 375 kW (503 hp; 510 PS) (AWD EREV)
- Hybrid drivetrain: Series (range extender)
- Battery: 91.9 kWh LFP (EV); 110 kWh CALB NMC (EV); 63.3 kWh CALB LFP (EREV)
- Electric range: 702 km (436 mi) (CLTC, EV); 648 km (403 mi) (NEDC, EV); 553–591 km (344–367 mi) (WLTP, EV); 287 km (178 mi) (WLTP, EREV); Maximum 435 km (270 mi) (CLTC, EREV)

Dimensions
- Wheelbase: 3,100 mm (122.0 in)
- Length: 5,120 mm (201.6 in)
- Width: 1,999 mm (78.7 in)
- Height: 1,782–1,795 mm (70.2–70.7 in)
- Curb weight: 2,600–2,835 kg (5,732–6,250 lb)

The XPeng G9L (Chinese: 小鹏G9L; pinyin: Xiǎopéng G9L) is a battery electric and range-extended full-size SUV produced by XPeng.

== Overview ==
The G9L was revealed on 9 May 2026 via filings from the Ministry of Industry and Information Technology. It is positioned between the flagship GX and the mid-size G9. Despite sharing a similar name, the G9L is unrelated to the G9 and is instead heavily related to the GX.

Rear view

Interior

=== Design and features ===
The G9L uses two separate light bars for headlights and taillights, with the front end using a closed design with an active air intake. A similar design is used for the taillights, which are situated on a clamshell tailgate. The body design uses dynamic and smooth lines, extending towards a fastback-like roofline with cues adopted from the second-generation P7 sedan. This results in a relatively low drag coefficient of 0.238 Cd. Despite the imminent ban on retractable door handles in China from 2027 onwards, the G9L was released with such door handles.

The G9L interior is largely identical towards that of the GX. It features a 17.3-inch central touchscreen display, a thin 8.8-inch instrument cluster, an 88-inch augmented reality head-up display, a touchscreen in the rear, as well as a 21.4-inch rear ceiling-mounted display. All four seats are equipped with heating, ventilating, 16-point massaging and zero-gravity functions, and can also simultaneously recline to create a flat surface of over 1.8 m (71 in) that can be used as a resting space. The rear fold-down center console features an electronically deploying folding table and a 50W wireless phone charger. Additional features include a 12.5-liter refrigerator, a large panoramic sunroof and a 33-speaker sound system. With the second row seats up, the G9L's trunk has a capacity of 1,152 L (40.7 cu ft), while BEV versions also have a 109 L (3.8 cu ft) frunk.

Up to three in-house Turing AI chips are equipped, enabling a maximum computing power of 2,250 TOPS. Rear wheel steering is available, reducing its turning radius to 4.96 m (195 in).

== Powertrain ==
The BEV version of the G9L offers single-motor and dual-motor setups, where the former excludes the front motor. The front and rear motor produce a peak power output of 160 kW (215 hp; 218 PS) and 270 kW (362 hp; 367 PS) respectively.

The EREV version of the G9L is also offered in single-motor and dual-motor setups, where the former excludes the front motor. The front and rear motor produce a peak power output of 160 kW (215 hp; 218 PS) and 210 kW (282 hp; 286 PS), respectively. It is equipped with a 1.5-liter turbocharged inline-4 gasoline engine supplied by Harbin Dongan, a subsidiary of Changan, serving as a range extender which outputs 147 hp (110 kW; 149 PS). It has a 63.3 kWh LFP battery pack supplied by CALB which weighs 451 kg (994 lb) and provides a WLTP electric range of 350 km (217 mi) and 325 km (202 mi) for rear-wheel drive and all-wheel drive, respectively.

All versions are built on an 800-volt platform and can support up to 5C charging, completing a charge from 10%-80% in up to 11 minutes.

== Markets ==
=== Australia ===
Towards the end of 2025, XPeng announced that the G9L would be exported to Australia in late 2026, alongside the F30b G6 and the X9, which will be launched in the country in the first quarter of 2026 and mid-2026 respectively.

=== Europe ===
The G9L passed a trial production run at Magna Steyr's Graz, Austria, plant in October 2026. It launched in eight European countries on 12 October, with the first pre-production model travelling 1,324 km (823 mi) from Graz to Paris, France, for its debut at the 2026 Paris Motor Show

=== Indonesia ===
The G9L was launched in Indonesia on 11 November 2026. It is available in the sole Ultra AWD variant, powered by the 110 kWh battery pack.

=== Thailand ===
The G9L launched in Thailand on 11 November 2026, with a battery electric version. It is available in the sole variant: Ultra AWD, powered by the 110 kWh battery pack.
