= XPeng G3 =

Battery electric compact crossover SUV

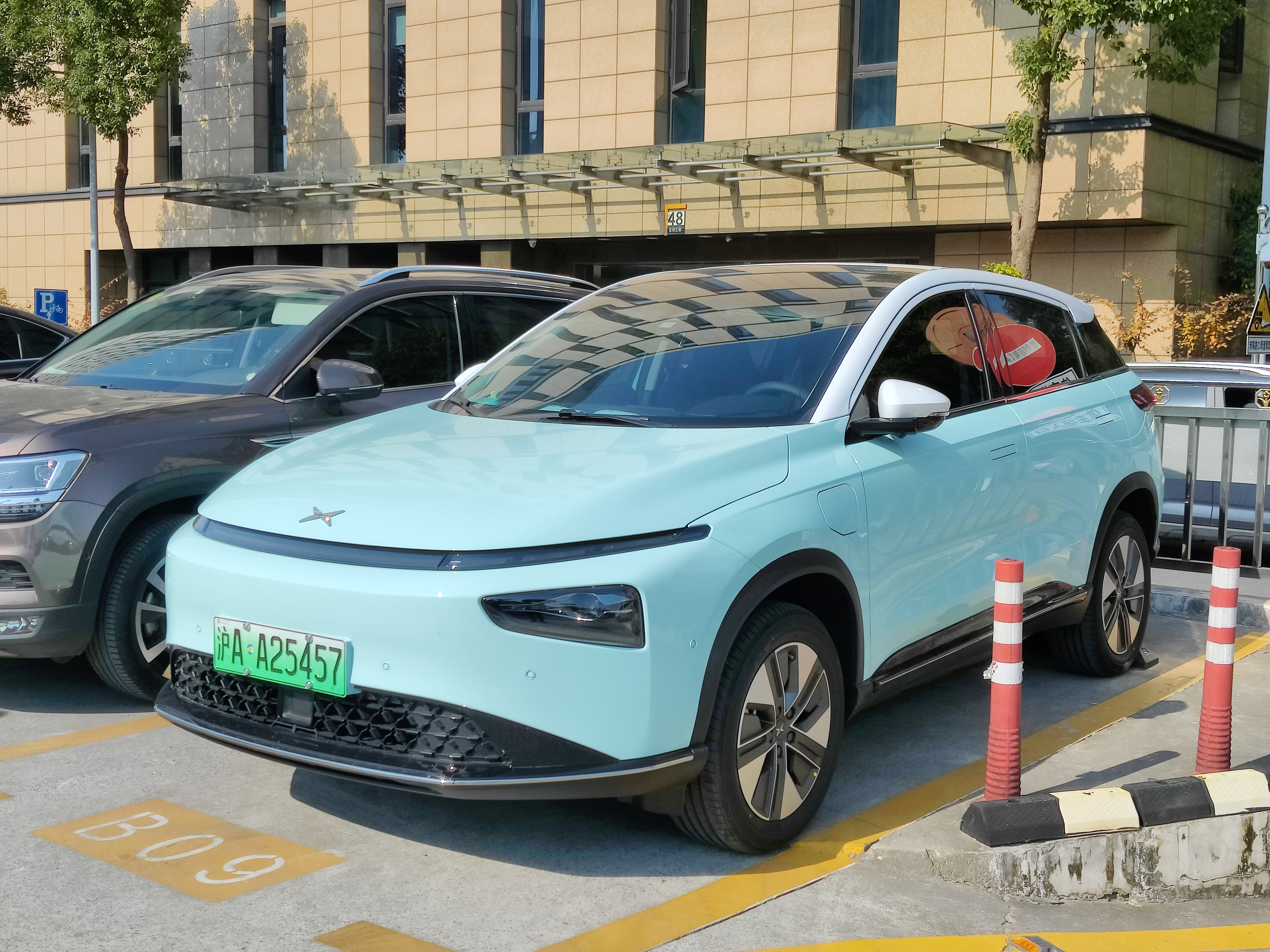

Overview
- Manufacturer: XPeng
- Production: 2018–2023
- Assembly: China: Zhengzhou, Henan

Body and chassis
- Class: Compact crossover SUV
- Body style: 5-door SUV
- Layout: Front-motor, front-wheel drive Dual-motors Four-wheel drive

Powertrain
- Electric motor: 2nd Generation Permanent Magnet Synchronous Motor, 145 kW (194 hp; 197 PS)
- Battery: 50.5 or 65.5 kWh lithium-ion
- Range: 401 km (249 mi) or 520 km (320 mi) NEDC

Dimensions
- Wheelbase: 2,625 mm (103.3 in)
- Length: 4,450 mm (175.2 in)
- Width: 1,820 mm (71.7 in)
- Height: 1,610 mm (63.4 in)
- Kerb weight: 1,578–1,637 kg (3,479–3,609 lb)

The XPeng G3 (Chinese: 小鹏G3; pinyin: Xiǎopéng G3) is a battery electric compact crossover SUV produced by the Chinese electric car company XPeng. It was the first mass-produced vehicle by XPeng as production commenced November 2018.

Originally revealed as the XPeng Beta during prototype phase in 2016, the name was changed for the limited run first batch edition to XPeng Identy X in 2017.

After almost three years for sale, on 9 July 2021, the manufacturer introduced the updated facelift version of the model with the name of XPeng G3i. It features a front light bar like its counterparts P5, P7, and G9. First units scheduled to be delivered throughout the month of September 2021.

In December 2023, Xpeng announced the production of G3 and G3i would cease before 2024.

== XPeng Identy X ==
The battery cell type of the XPeng Identy X is a Samsung 18650 with an energy density of 152 Wh/kg. Range of the car is 300 km (190 mi). 0–100 km/h (0–62 mph) acceleration will take 5.8 seconds, or 7.9 seconds in 2WD mode.

The motor of the XPeng Identy X is made by Jin-Jing Electric, a Beijing-based company. Top speed of the Identy X is 170 km/h (110 mph). The Identy X is front-wheel drive, with the battery pack located in the floor. The later revealed 4WD version which has a second smaller motor sitting over the rear axle.

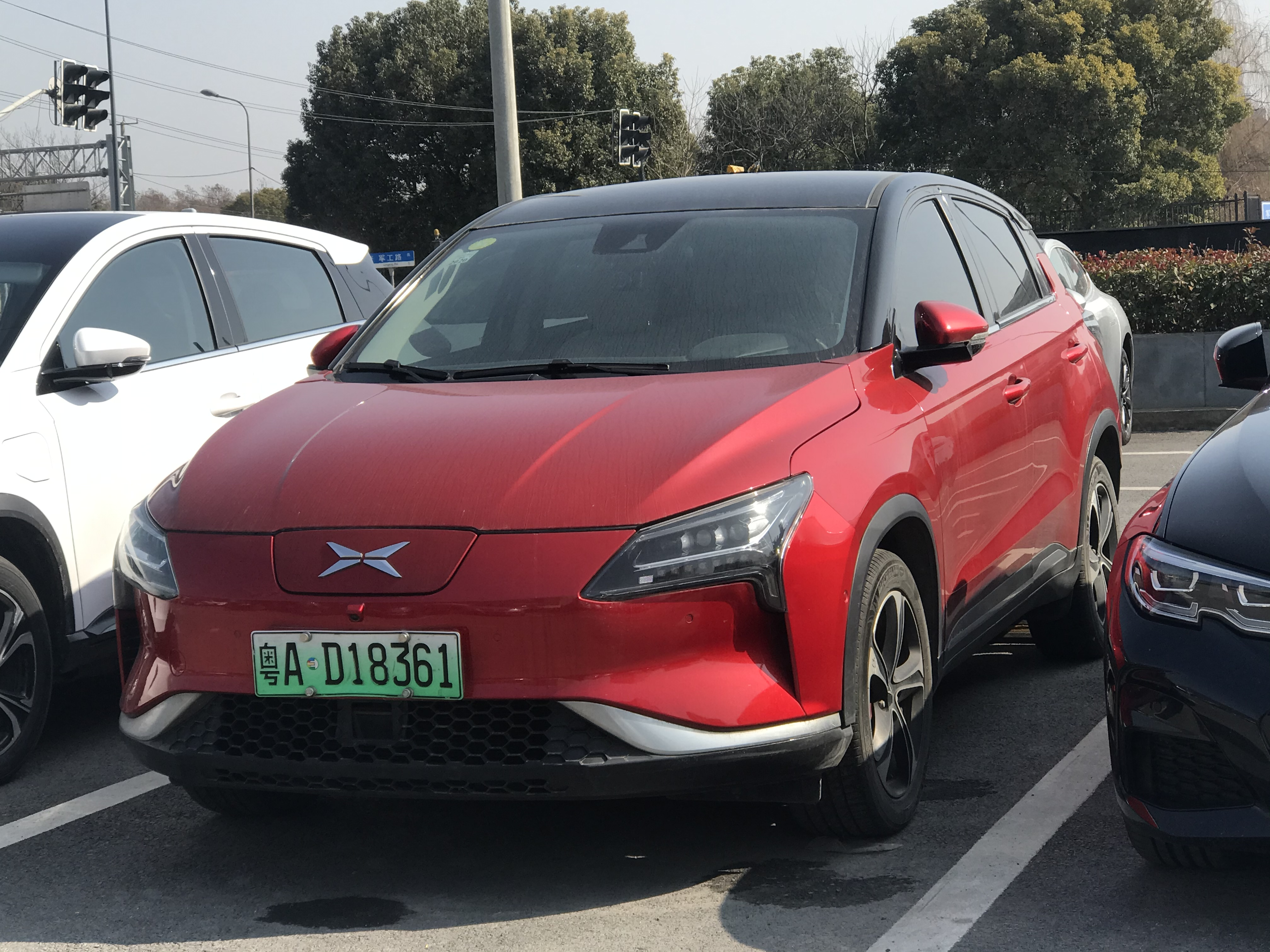
XPeng Identy X front

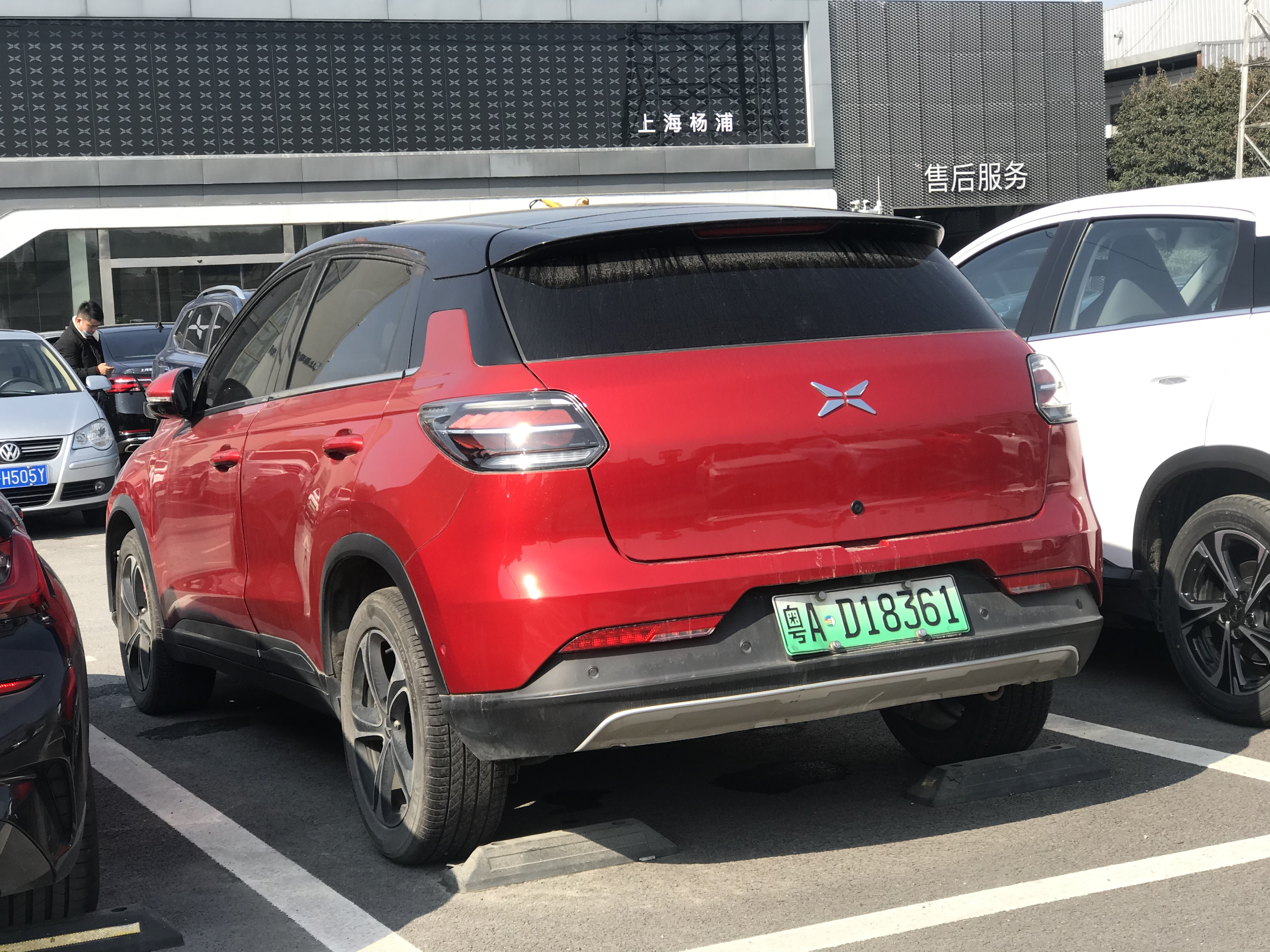
XPeng Identy X rear

== History ==
The XPeng G3 mass production version was unveiled during the January 2018 Consumer Electronics Show in Las Vegas. According to XPeng Motors, G3 stood for Geek3, and that the name was chosen after a crowd-sourced naming contest. The XPeng G3 is actually the second batch production car, also known as the XPeng 2.0. The XPeng 1.0 was the limited run first-edition pre-production run of 15 cars reserved for founders and investors called the XPeng Identy X revealed in 2017.

As of October 2017, the mass production XPeng G3 crossover output was planned to be 190 hp (190 PS; 140 kW), good for a top speed of 170 km/h (110 mph). The XPeng G3 was planned to be equipped with a 47.6 kWh battery with a claimed range of 300 kilometres (186 mi) and 0–100 km/h (0–62 mph) acceleration in 8.2 seconds for the front wheel drive version and 5.8 seconds for the 4WD version. The electric motor was planned to be 187 hp (139 kW; 190 PS) and is located over the front axle. As of September 2021, the XPeng G3's list price ranged from 149,800 to 199,800 yuan.

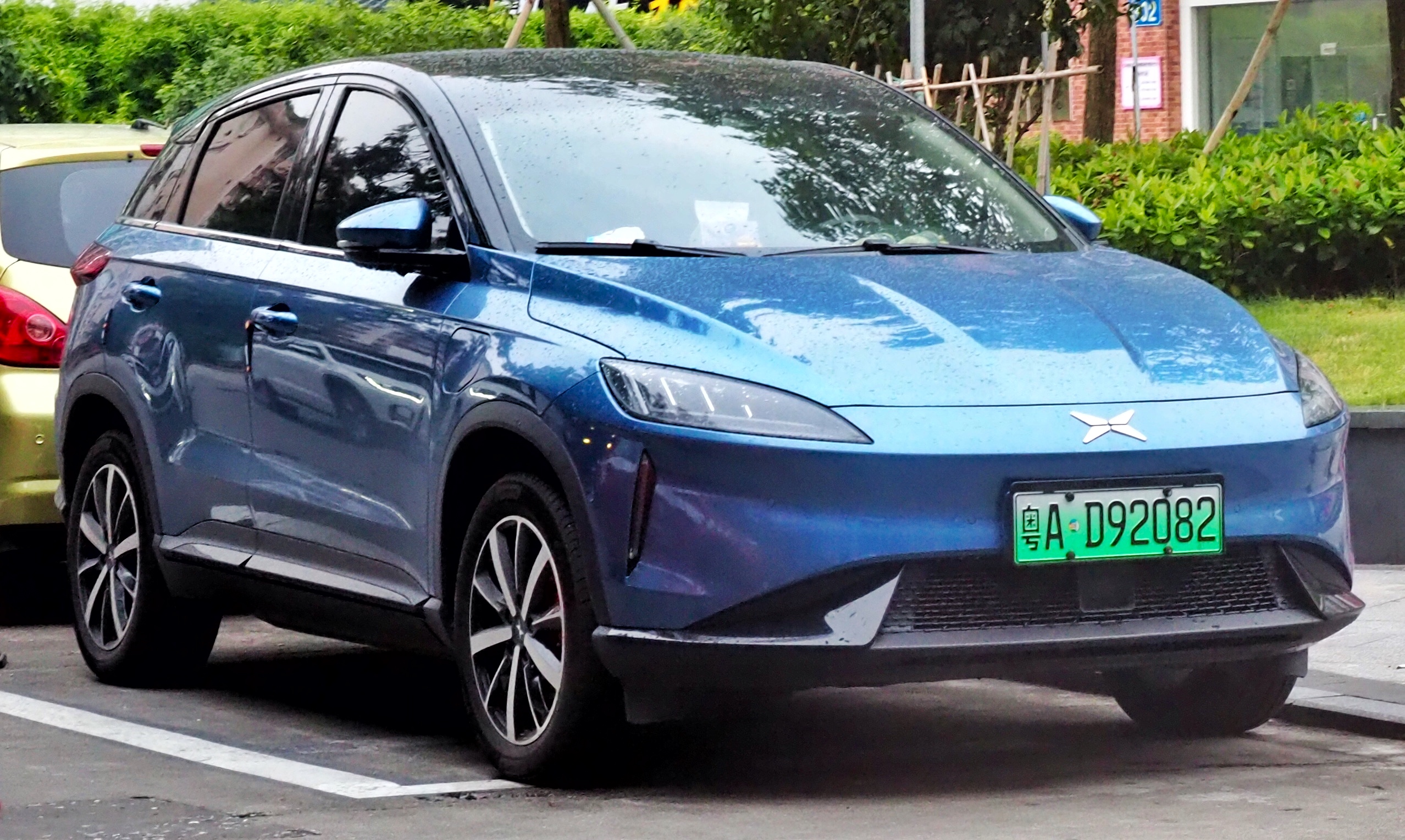
XPeng G3 front

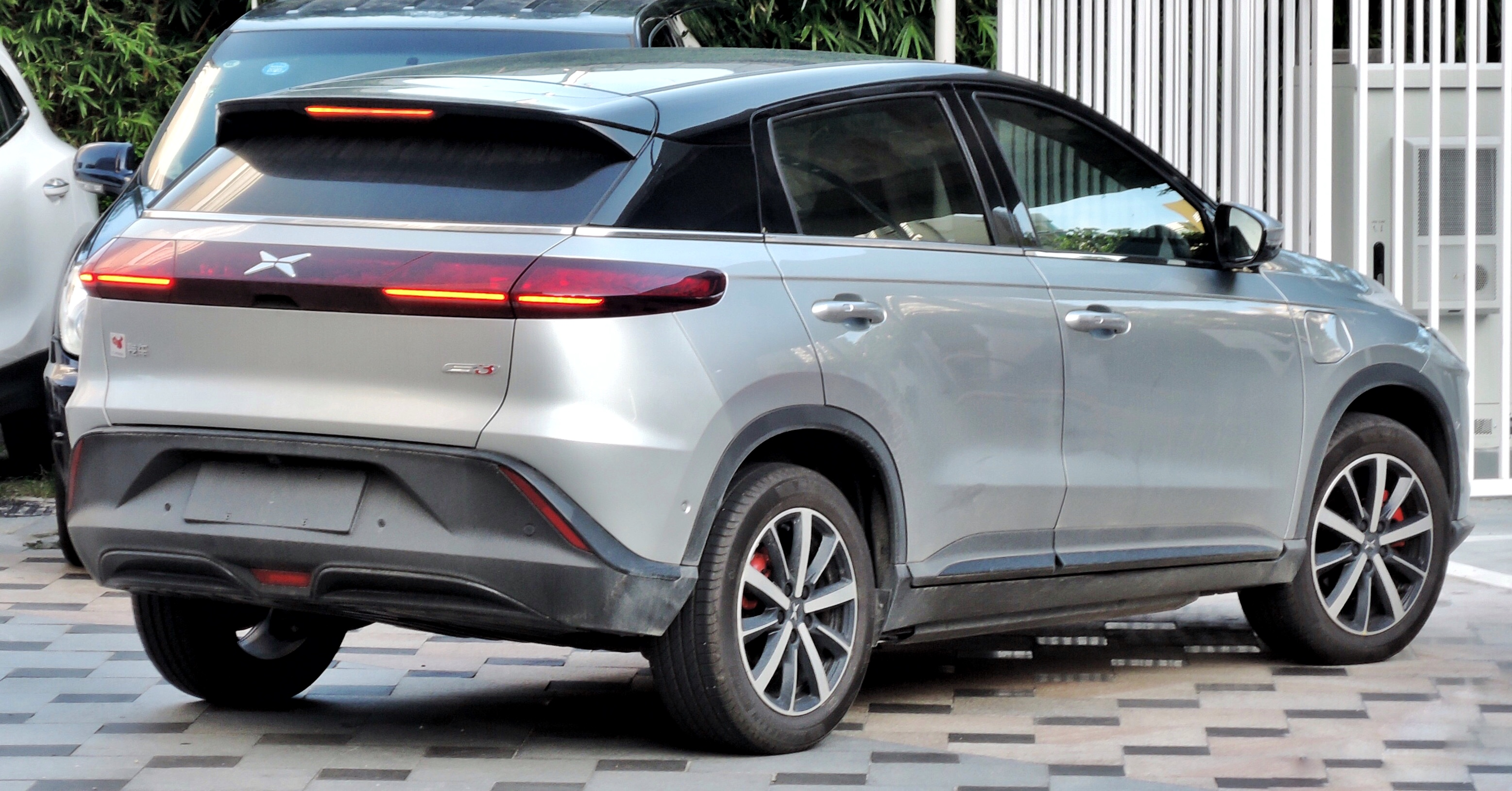
XPeng G3 rear

The G3 Long Range model was released in July 2019 with a larger 66.5 kWh battery and a claimed range of 520 km (320 mi). The original model was upgraded to a 50.5 kWh battery giving a range of 401 km (249 mi). Performance has decreased from the original version, with acceleration of 0–100 km/h (0–62 mph) in 8.5 seconds and 8.6 seconds for the long range model.

XPeng started exporting the G3 to Norway in 2020.

== XPeng G3i ==
The XPeng G3i is the mid-cycle facelift unveiled in 2021, featuring a new fascia for the exterior design in the same style as the P7 sedan. It is equipped with the updated intelligent in-car operating system (Xmart OS) and the autonomous driving assistance systems XPILOT 2.5. Since XPeng acquired the qualification of automotive manufacturing from the Chinese government, the production of XPeng G3i had been moved to XPeng's own factory located in Zhaoqing City instead of OEM by Haima Automobile. The G3i started to deliver to users in Mainland China since the September of 2021.

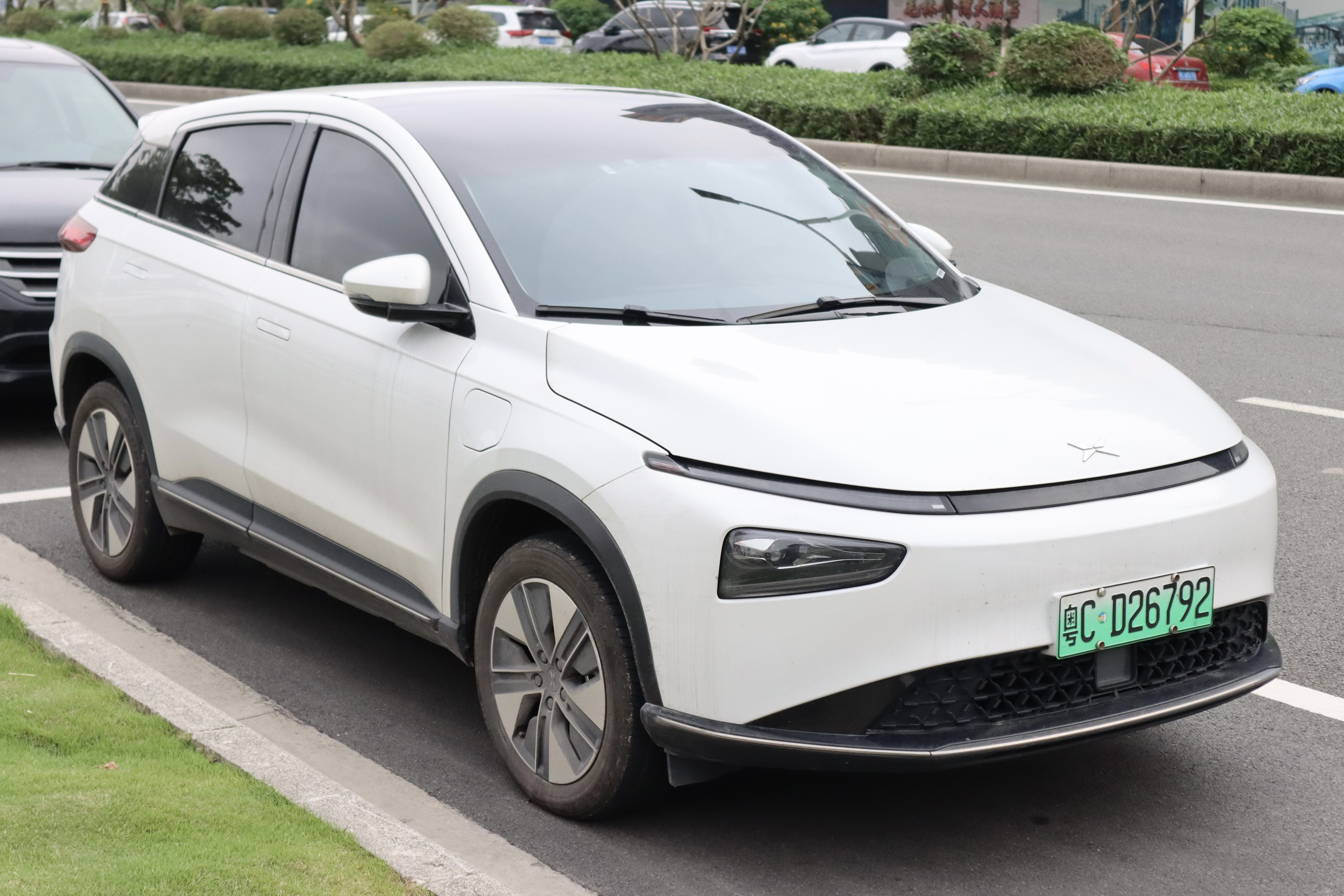
XPeng G3i front

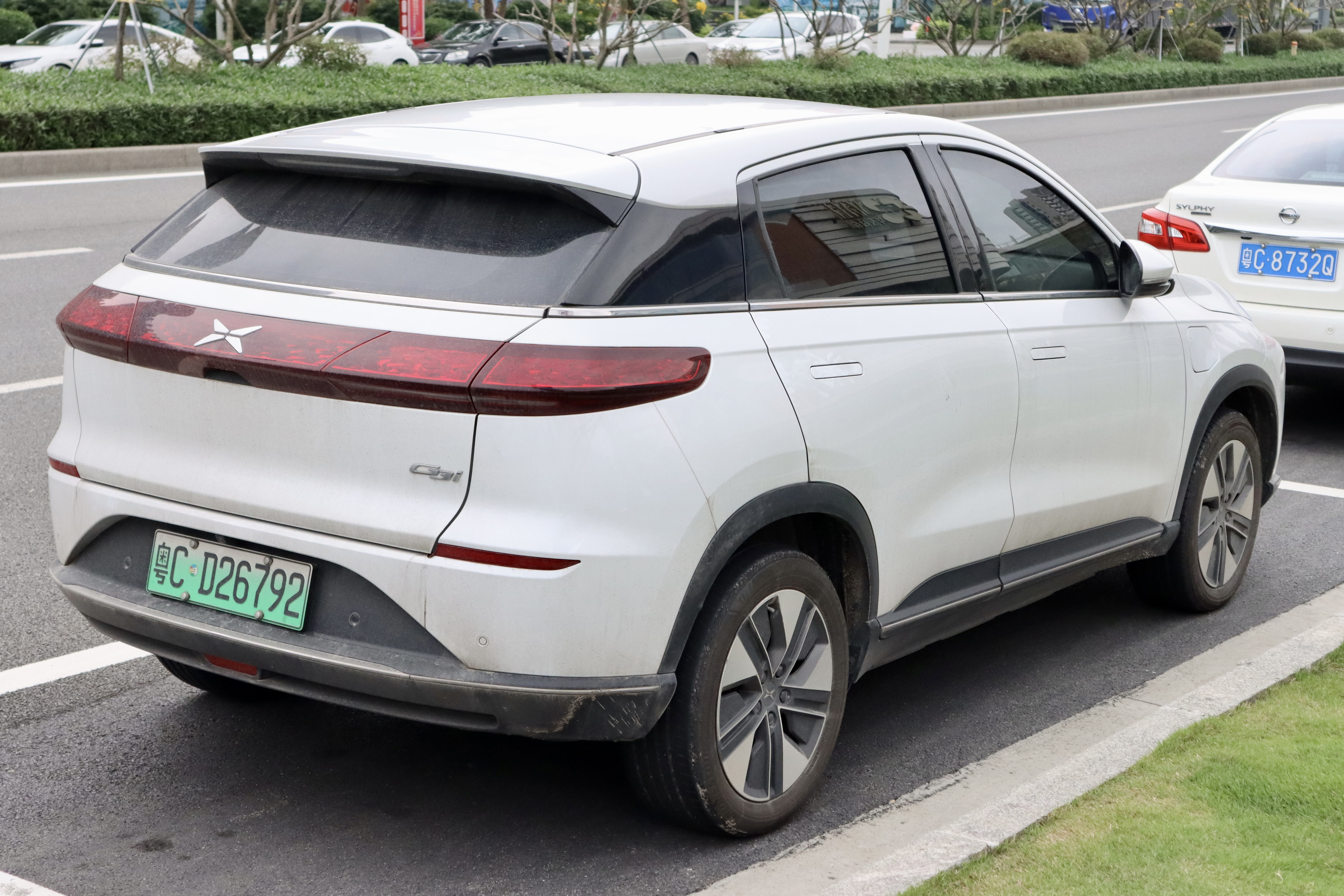
XPeng G3i rear

== Safety ==
C-NCAP (2018) test results 2019 XPeng G3 Intelligent
Category		%
Overall:	5 /5 stars	92.2%
Occupant protection:		96.50%
Vulnerable road users:		70.34%
Active safety:		94.09%

== Sales ==
Year	China
2020	11,691
2021	29,721
2022	17,336
2023	5,301
2024	813
2025	35
