= XPeng Mona M03 =

Battery electric compact car

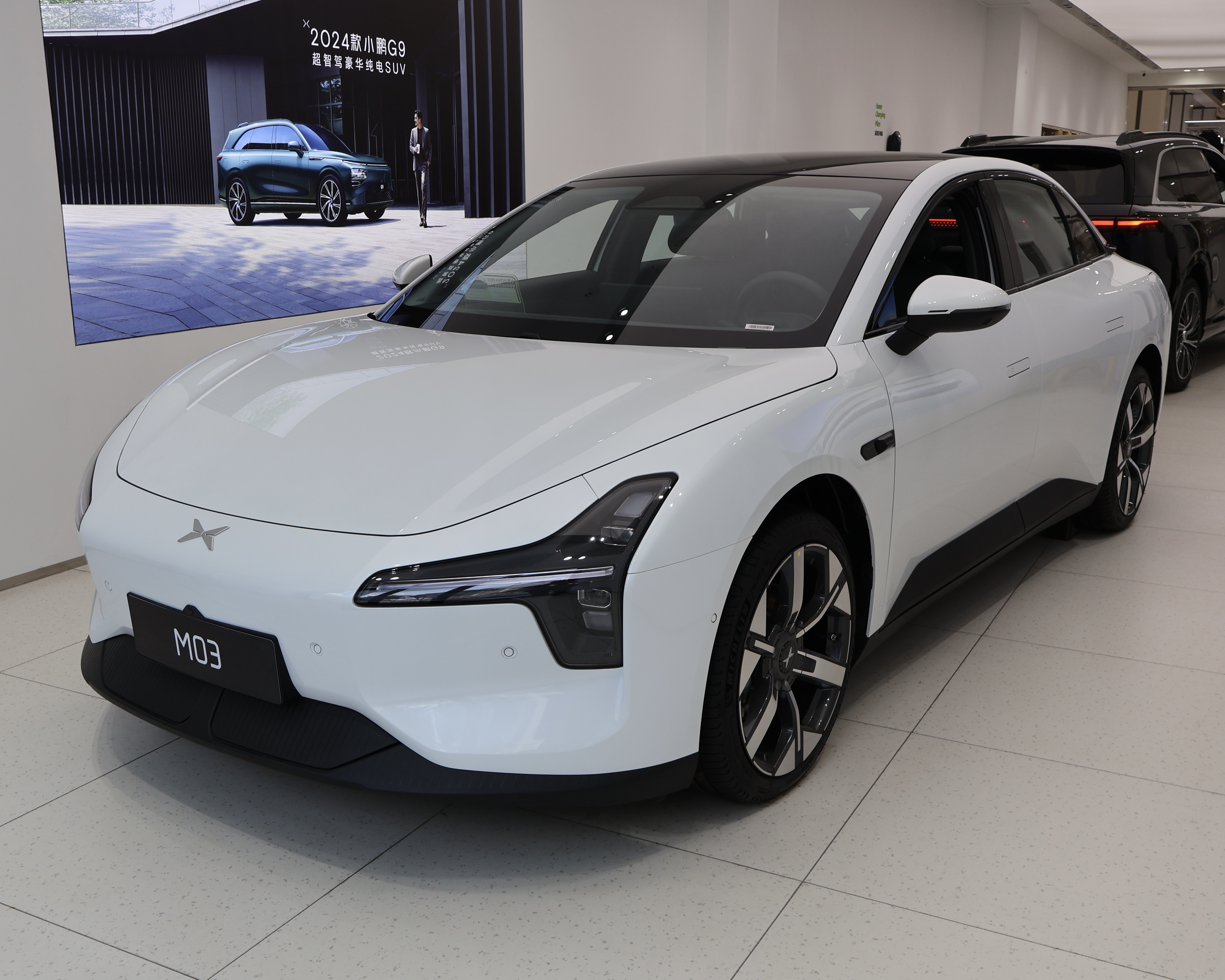

Overview
- Manufacturer: XPeng
- Model code: Mona (DiDi); D01 (XPeng)
- Production: August 2024 – present
- Assembly: China: Zhaoqing, Guangdong

Body and chassis
- Class: Compact car (C)
- Body style: 5-door liftback sedan
- Layout: Front-motor, front-wheel-drive

Powertrain
- Electric motor: Permanent magnet synchronous
- Power output: 140–160 kW (190–218 PS; 188–215 hp)
- Battery: 51.8 kWh LFP blade FinDreams; 62.2 kWh LFP FinDreams
- Electric range: 515–620 km (320–385 mi) (CLTC)
- Plug-in charging: 72-92 kW (DC)

Dimensions
- Wheelbase: 2,815 mm (110.8 in)
- Length: 4,780 mm (188.2 in)
- Width: 1,896 mm (74.6 in)
- Height: 1,445 mm (56.9 in)
- Curb weight: 1,661–1,739 kg (3,662–3,834 lb)

Chronology
- Predecessor: XPeng P5

The XPeng Mona M03 (Chinese: 小鹏MONA M03; pinyin: Xiǎopéng MONA M03) is a battery electric compact car manufactured by Chinese electric car company XPeng and originally developed by DiDi, a Chinese ride-hailing company. It is the first product under the Mona product line, which focuses on lower-priced vehicles in the mainstream segment as opposed to the premium positioning of previous XPeng vehicles. In China, it occupies the A-class segment, equivalent to the global C-segment.

According to XPeng, Mona stands for "Made Of New AI". The company's CEO, He Xiaopeng, mentioned that the alphanumeric name "M03" was chosen as a tribute to the Tesla Model 3.

== History ==
=== Development ===
Originally developed by DiDi's smart electric vehicle department called Da Vinci, the project was codenamed "Mona" during its development starting from 2021. Original plans were to launch DiDi's own budget entry level EV brand, and the Mona would be the first product to be launched. Plans started to change in late 2022 when the development of the Mona project was nearly complete, with camouflaged testing prototypes seen driving around in March 2023. At that time, most of the Da Vinci team was laid off, shortly before DiDi sold its EV development business along with the Mona project to XPeng in August 2023.

=== Release ===
The vehicle was previewed with a set of images in June 2024, then introduced in July 2024 and went on sale in August 2024 ahead of the Chengdu Auto Show. Deliveries began on August 30, 2024, and total deliveries reached 30,000 units in November 2024. The Max variant, equipped with urban supervised autonomous driving capabilities, was launched on May 20, 2025, with deliveries beginning on May 28.

== Specifications ==
During launch, the Mona M03 is available in three variants called 515, 620 and 580 Max, denoting its CLTC ranges. The 515 version is powered by a 51.8 kWh battery, while the 620 and 580 Max uses a 62.2 kWh pack. Both are LFP blade batteries produced by FinDreams, which can recharge from 30 to 80% in 26 minutes. It is powered by a front-mounted single motor with a 0–100 km/h (0–62 mph) acceleration figure of 7.8 seconds for the entry version and 7.4 seconds for the 620 and 580 Max.

The M03 uses a MacPherson strut front suspension and torsion beam rear suspension.

According to XPeng, the development of the vehicle was focused on reducing drag on the car. XPeng claims that the model has lowest drag coefficient among the world's mass-produced fully electric hatchbacks at Cd 0.194. The Mona M03 underwent 10 wind tunnel tests of more than 100 hours each, which shaved off Cd 0.085 from the wind resistance leading to a claimed 60 km (37 mi) range increase.

The exterior was originally available in Nebula White, Dark Night Black, and Star Ocean Beige, with Star Twilight Purple, Micro-moon Grey, and Star Rain Green becoming available later with the release of the Max models. The interior is available in Morning Fog Grey or Night Grey, with Dawn Purple available exclusively with the Star Twilight Purple paint color. It has the option of 18-inch low-drag or 19-inch sporty wheels. The Max variant has frameless side mirrors with teal autonomous driving indicator lights.

The Mona M03 only has a large floating central infotainment screen with a size of 15.6 inches. The system is powered by a Qualcomm Snapdragon 8155 chip with 16 GB RAM. The car has no physical buttons except for two scroll wheels on the steering wheel. An instrument panel screen behind the steering wheel is an optional plug-in accessory. The model also has option of a rear entertainment screen.

As standard, the Xpeng Mona M03 is equipped with 2 mmWave radars, 7 cameras and 12 ultrasonic sensors to support its XPILOT L2 intelligent driving system. Max variants have an XNGP system capable of supervised autonomous driving in urban conditions, and are equipped with an additional mmWave radar, 5 more cameras, and are powered by two Nvidia Orin X SoCs capable of a total of 508 TOPS, and notably does not use LiDAR sensors.

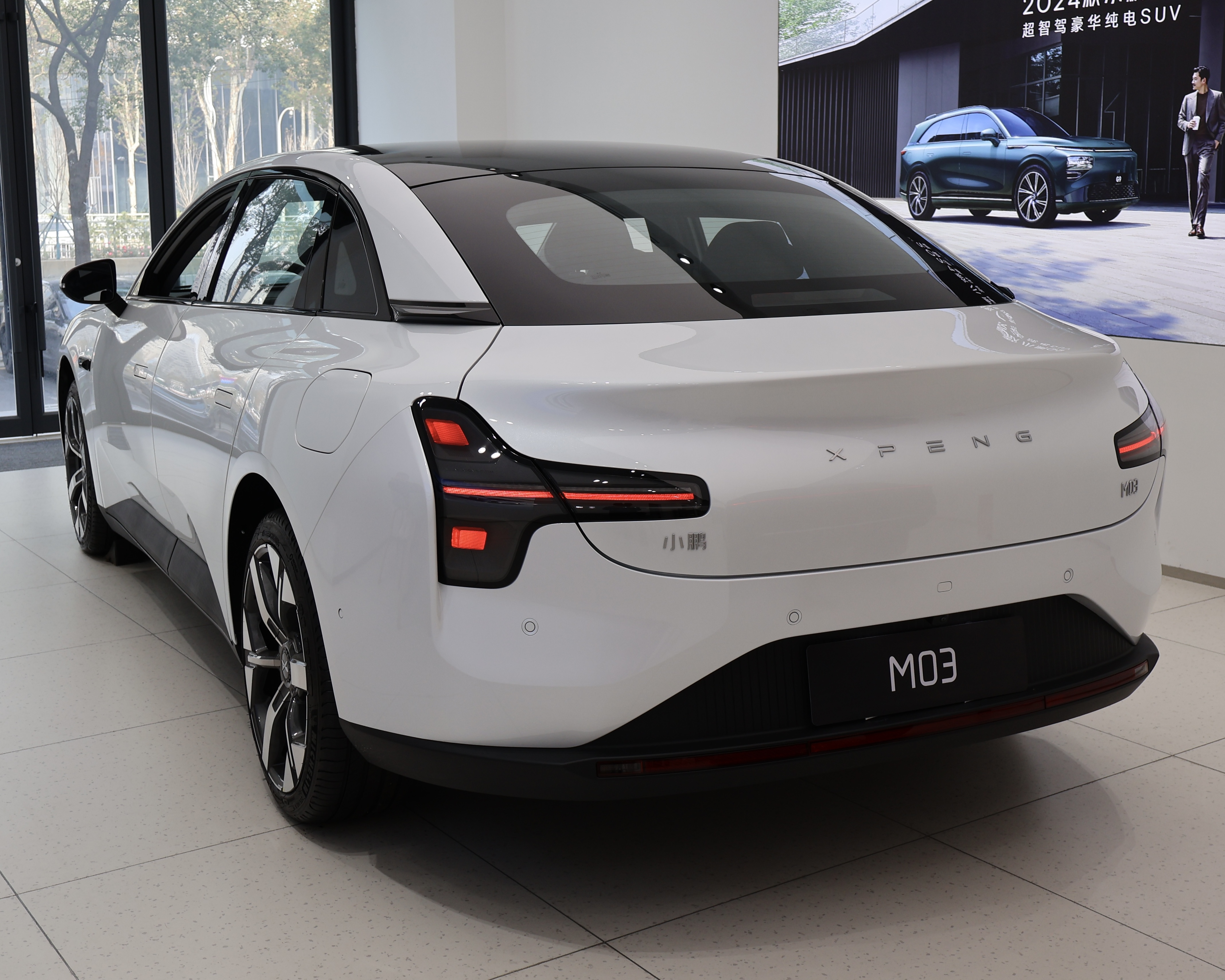
Rear view

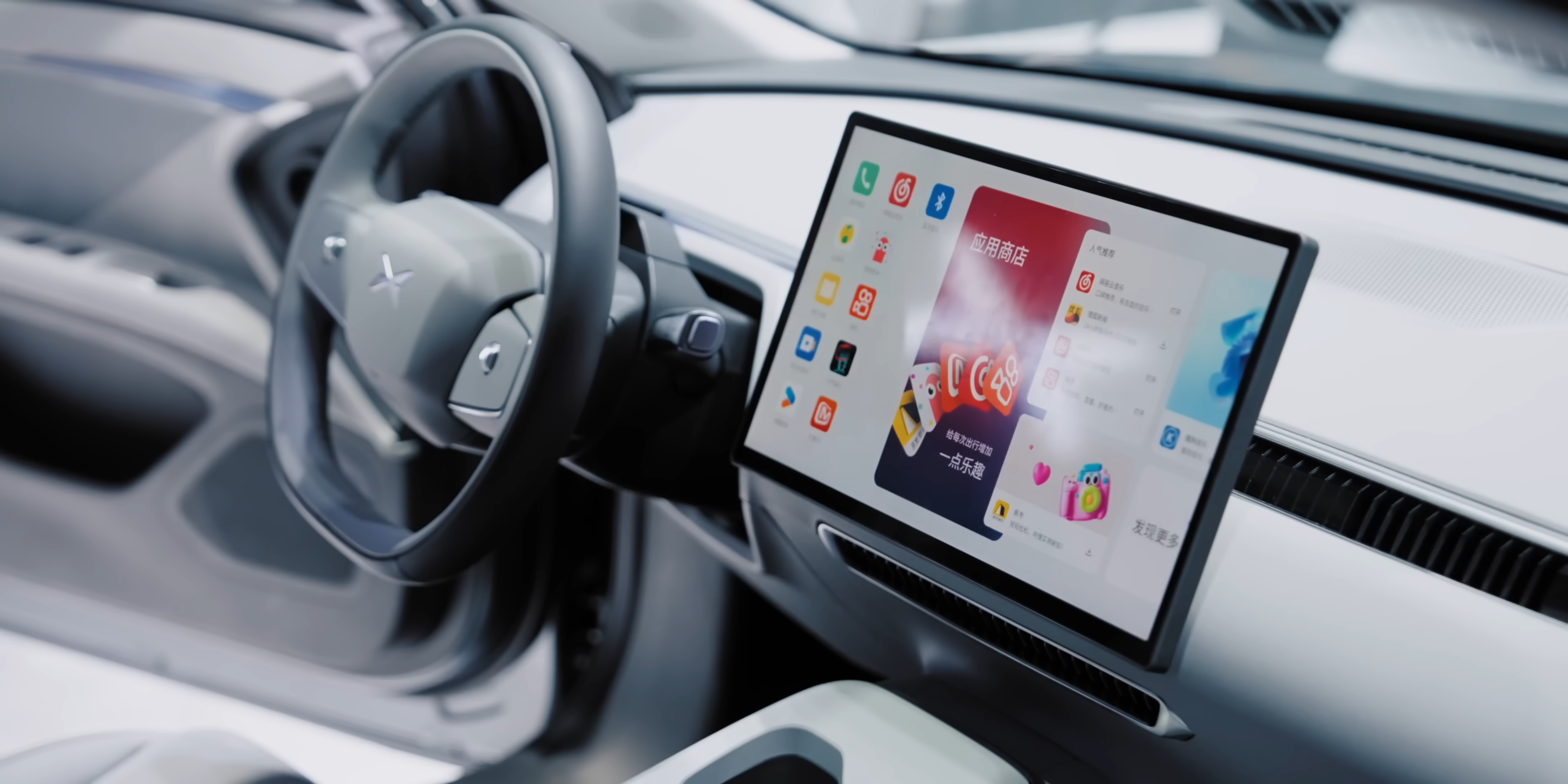
Interior

== Powertrain ==
Model	Range (CLTC)	Battery	Power	Torque	0–100 km/h (62 mph)	Top speed
Long Range Plus	515 km (320 mi)	51.8 kWh LFP Blade FinDreams	140 kW (188 hp; 190 PS)	225 N⋅m (166 lb⋅ft)	7.8sec	155 km/h (96 mph)
Long Range Max	502 km (312 mi)	51.8 kWh LFP Blade FinDreams	140 kW (188 hp; 190 PS)	225 N⋅m (166 lb⋅ft)	7.8sec	155 km/h (96 mph)
Ultra Long Range Plus	620 km (385 mi)	62.2 kWh LFP Blade FinDreams	160 kW (215 hp; 218 PS)	250 N⋅m (184 lb⋅ft)	7.4sec	155 km/h (96 mph)
Ultra Long Range Max	600 km (373 mi)	62.2 kWh LFP Blade FinDreams	160 kW (215 hp; 218 PS)	250 N⋅m (184 lb⋅ft)	7.4sec	155 km/h (96 mph)

== Sales ==
After deliveries began on August 30, 2024, total deliveries reached 30,000 units in mid-November 2024. At the launch of the Max variant on May 20, 2025, XPeng said that 90% of M03 customers are under the age of 35.

In November 2025, XPeng stated that over 200,000 units have been produced.

Year	China
2024	48,609
2025	175,183
