= XPeng P5 =

Battery electric compact executive sedan

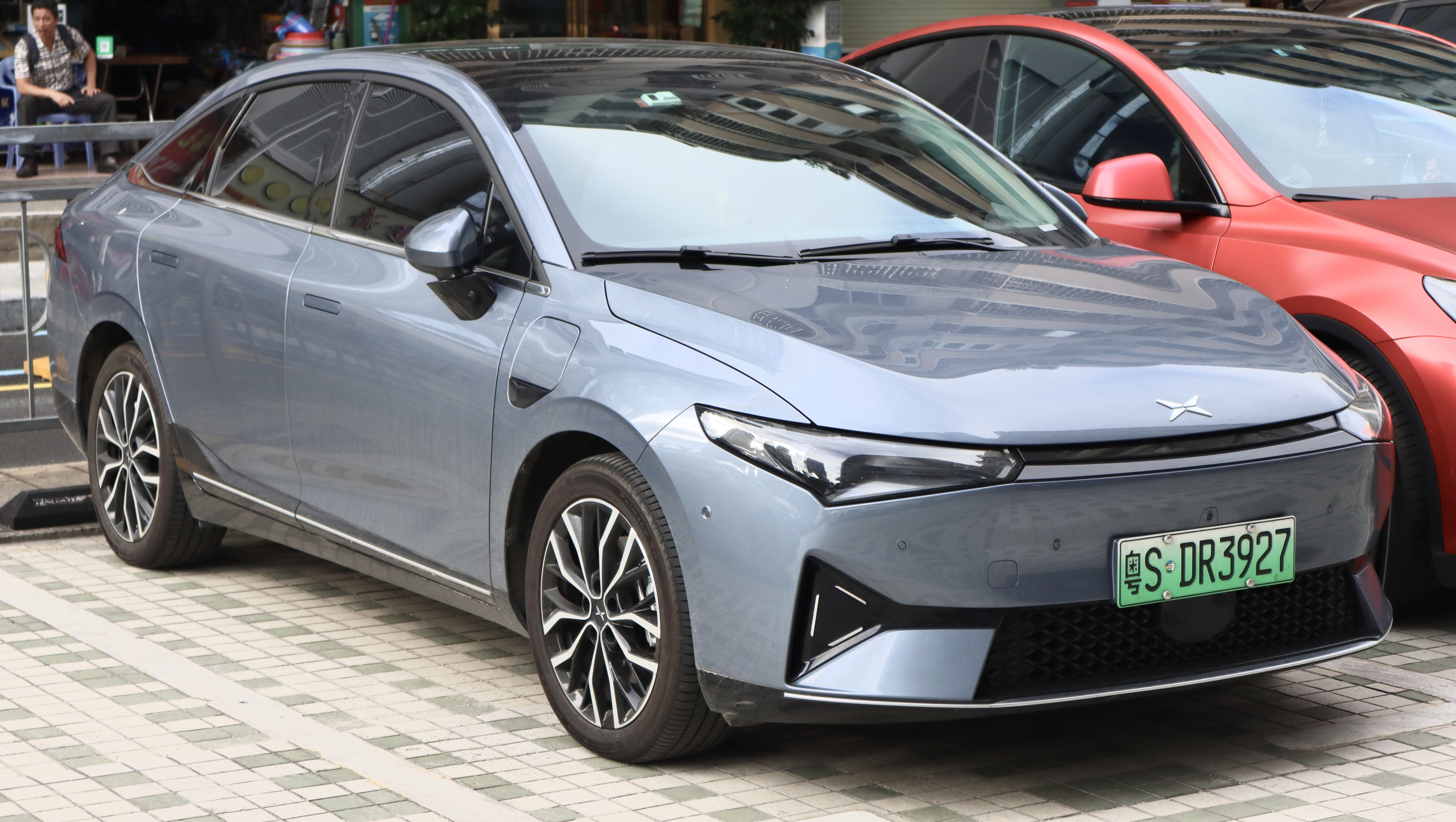

Overview
- Manufacturer: XPeng
- Production: 2021–2024
- Assembly: China: Zhaoqing
- Designer: Rafik Ferrag

Body and chassis
- Class: Compact executive car (D)
- Body style: 4-door sedan
- Layout: Front-motor, front-wheel drive

Powertrain
- Electric motor: 211 PS (155 kW; 208 hp)
- Transmission: 1-speed fixed gear
- Battery: 60.2-80.9 kWh Lithium ion
- Electric range: Maximum 600 kilometres (373 mi) (NEDC)

Dimensions
- Wheelbase: 2,768 mm (109.0 in)
- Length: 4,808 mm (189.3 in)
- Width: 1,840 mm (72 in)
- Height: 1,530 mm (60 in)
- Curb weight: 2,140 kg (4,718 lb)

Chronology
- Successor: XPeng Mona M03

The XPeng P5 (Chinese: 小鹏P5; pinyin: Xiǎopéng P5) is a battery electric compact executive sedan produced by the Chinese electric car company XPeng. It is the first mass-produced car to be equipped with LiDAR sensors for its advanced driver-assistance system (ADAS).

== History ==
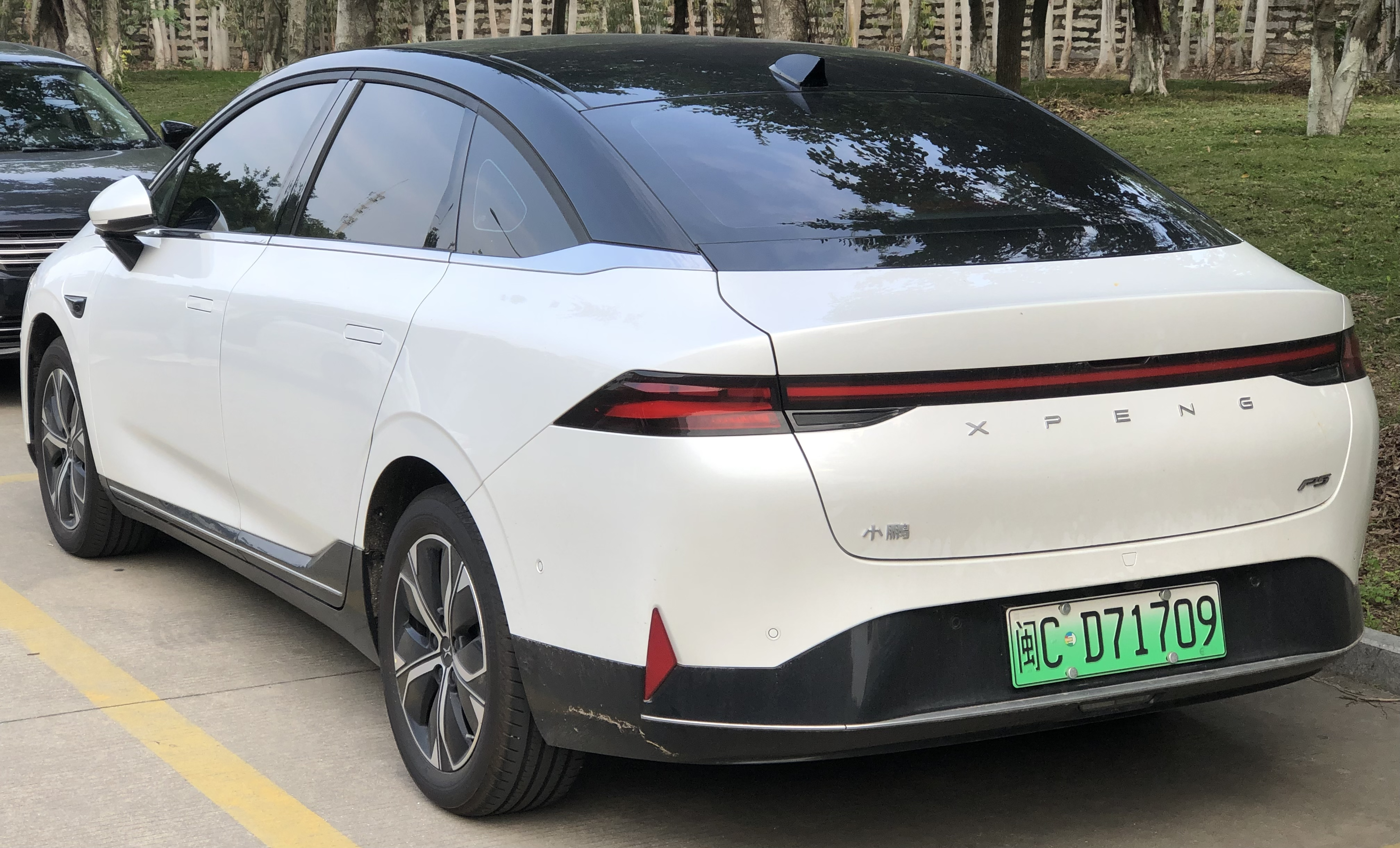
Rear view

At Auto Shanghai in April 2021, XPeng presented the third model of its brand, complementing the offer as a cheaper and smaller alternative to the flagship P7. It took the form of a compact 4-door sedan.

In terms of styling, the P5 developed on the styling concept of the larger P7, distinguishing itself by a gently sloping roof line towards the short, slender ending of the rear part of the body. Headlights made in LED technology were connected by a light strip between them, while the charging port was located in the right front fender.

The passenger compartment is kept in a minimalist design, dominated by a vast vertical multimedia system touch screen located at an angle between the edge of the dashboard and the central tunnel, characterised by a 15.6-inch diagonal. The vehicle is equipped with a third-generation Xmart OS 3.0 multimedia system with a voice control function. The P5 is known for its sleeping/cinema mode, front seats can lie flat to support an air bed along with the rear seat bottom cushions. Optional full-width projection screen, rear centre console mini-fridge, 220 V third party appliances.

The P5 is the first mass-produced car in history to be optionally equipped with the advanced LiDAR Technology autonomous driving system. It consists of sensors cooperating with a LiDAR that scans the surroundings of the car at a distance of 150 metres in the range of 150 degrees, including traffic lights, other moving vehicles, as well as pedestrians and cyclists moving nearby. The 32 sensors include two LiDARs, 12 ultrasonic and 5 mmWave sensors and 13 high-resolution cameras. With future OTA improvements, the P5 has the hardware capable of L4 Autonomous driving.

Sales of the P5 started in the fourth quarter of 2021, beginning in the Chinese market. In 2022, XPeng said they plan to start selling the vehicle in select Western European markets, starting with Norway.

== Drivetrain ==
The fully electric drive system of the P5 has a maximum range of approximately 600 km (370 mi) on a single charge. The car is only available in front-wheel drive.

== 2024 facelift ==
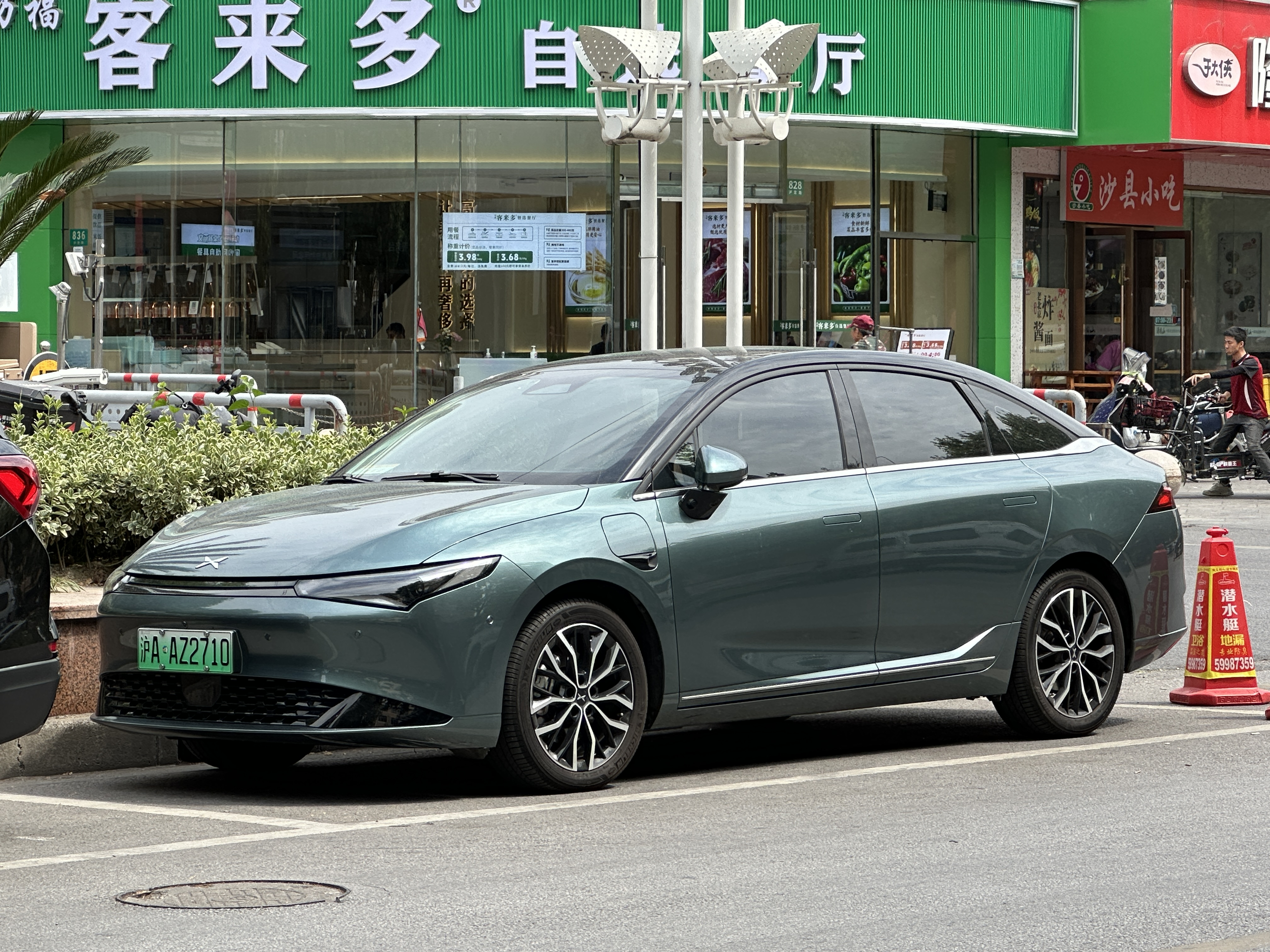
XPeng P5 2024 (facelift)

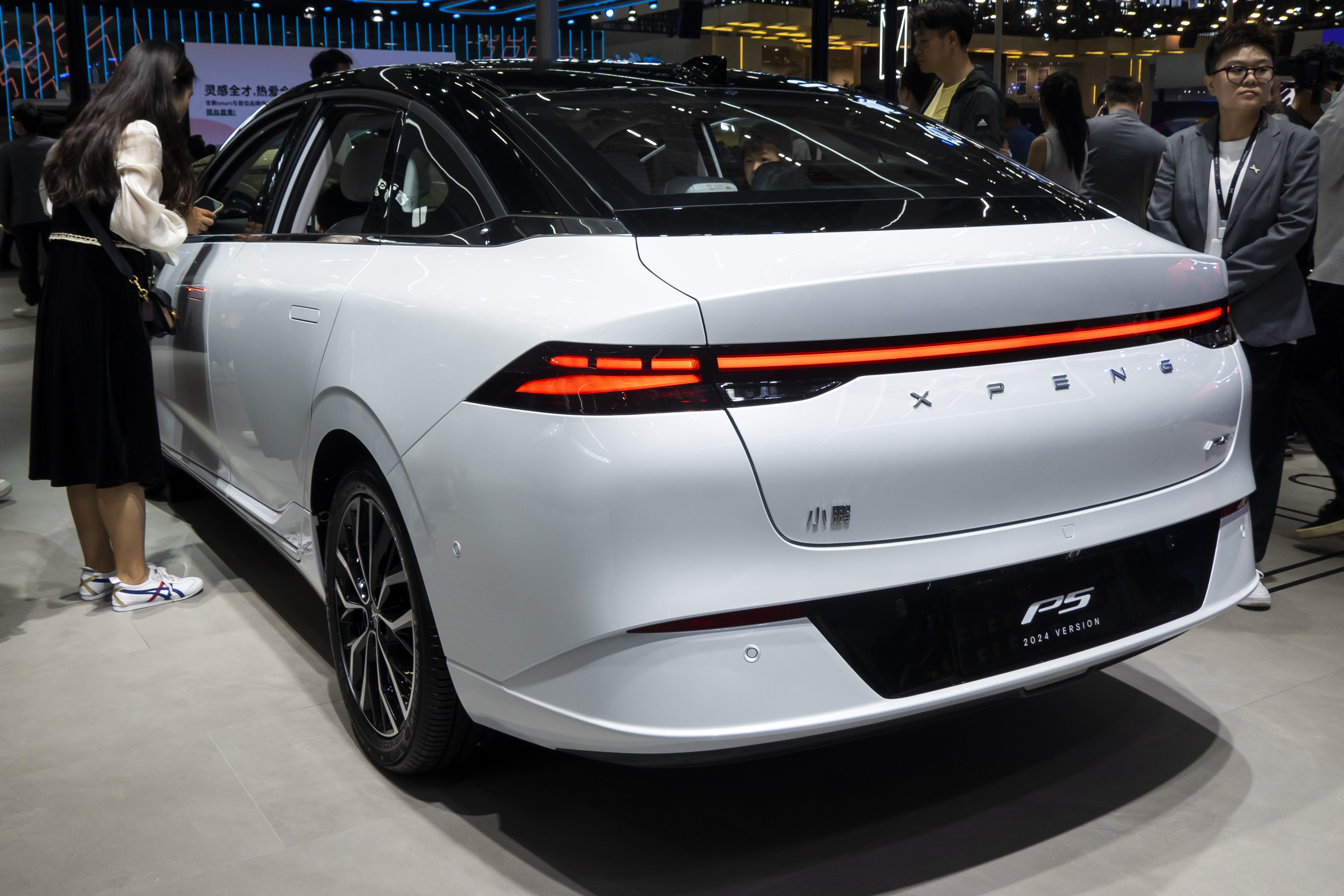
Rear view

== Sales ==
Within 53 hours of its debut at Auto Shanghai 2021, XPeng received 10,000 pre-orders for the P5.

Year	China
2021	7,865
2022	37,982
2023	20,120
2024	4,731
2025	616
