= Xia Heng =

Chinese entrepreneur

- 夏珩
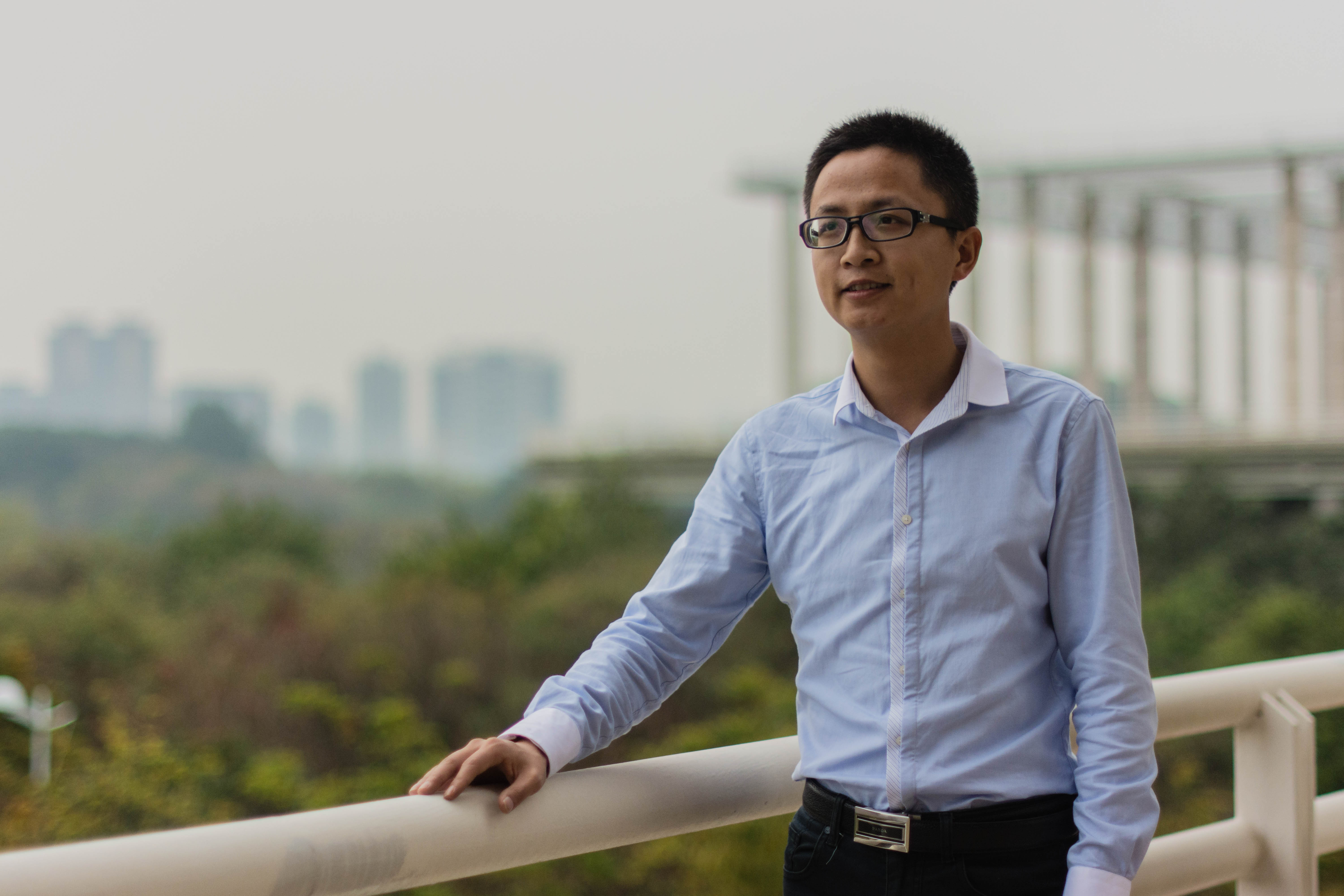
- Born: 7 November 1983 (age 42)
- Other name: Henry Xia
- Education: Tsinghua University
- Known for: Co-founding XPeng Motors

Xia Heng (Chinese: 夏珩; born 7 November 1983) or Henry Xia is a Chinese entrepreneur. He co-founded the Chinese battery-electric car company XPeng Motors.

== Early years ==
Heng studied automobile engineering at Tsinghua University and earned a master's degree in 2008 after 6 years there. Prior to co-founding XPeng Motors, Heng served as the supervisor for the New Energy Vehicle Control Section, a research and development team, at Guangzhou Automobile Group. He received multiple awards in research, innovation and management during his time at Guangzhou. Heng has worked as a resident engineer in multiple European countries, has published more than 10 research papers and patents about electric and smart vehicles, and has expertise in electric and smart vehicle controls, vehicle integration and project management.

== XPeng Motors ==
In 2014, Heng co-founded XPeng Motors with a small group of vehicle and IT experts. Heng is tasked with the company's strategic planning and product architecture design. The company initially focused on research and development for new core technologies for use in motors, batteries, electronic control systems and center-display touch screens. Heng recruited former employees from Guangzhou Automobile, BMW, Lamborghini, BYD, ALi, Tencent, Huawei, and Samsung. Since 2015, the company has built and tested four test cars. XPeng has projected that it will start production of its own vehicle before the end of 2017.
