= Wang Fengying =

Chinese business executive

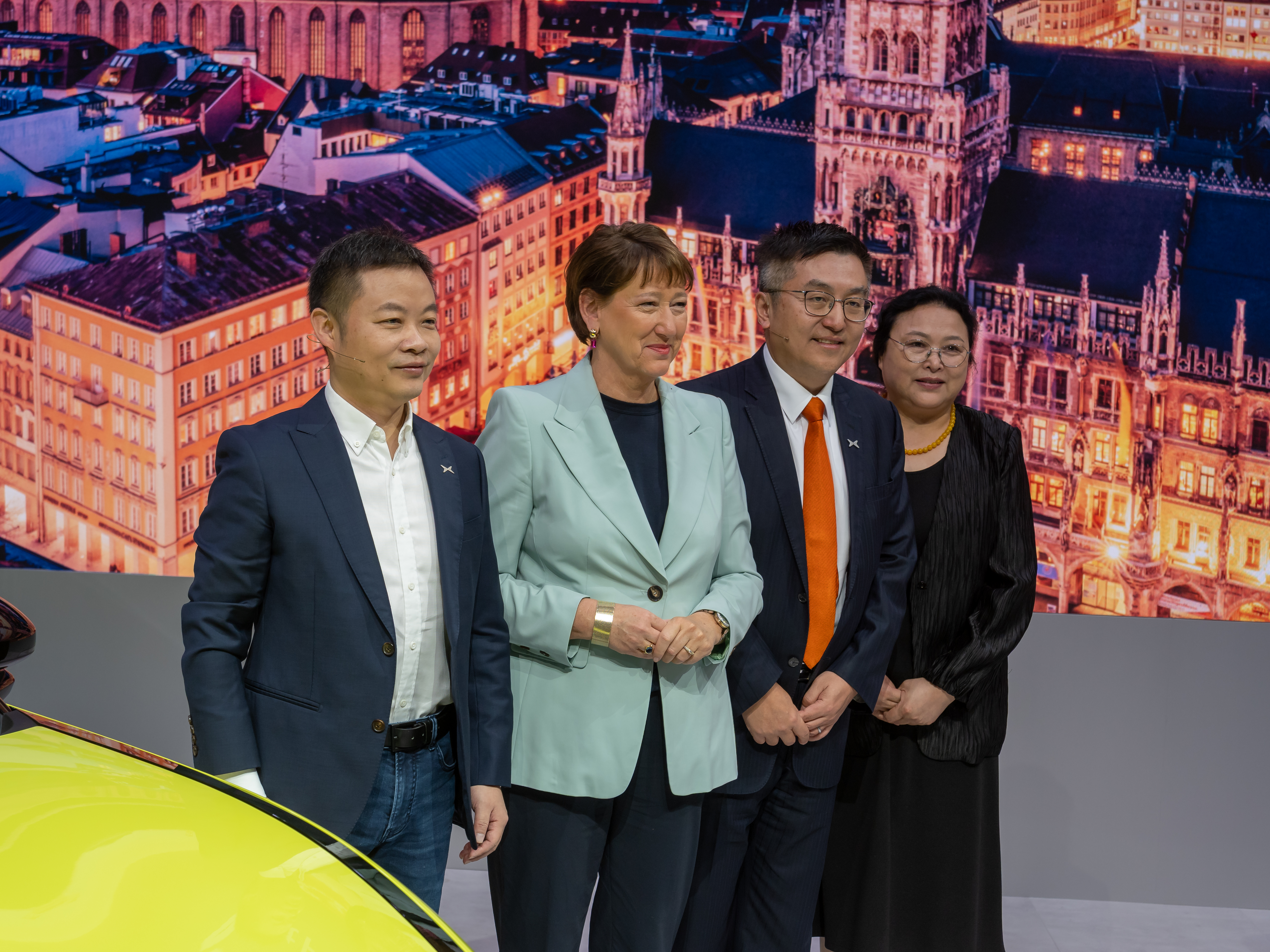
- Born: October 1970 (age 55); Baoding, Hebei, China
- Education: Tianjin Institute of Finance (BSc, MSc)
- Occupation: Business executive
- Title: President, XPeng
- Term: 2023–

Wang Fengying (born October 1970) is a Chinese businesswoman. She is the president of XPeng Motor, and former CEO of Great Wall Motor.

Wang Fengying was born in Baoding in Hebei province in northern China. In 1991, Wang earned a bachelor's degree from the Tianjin Institute of Finance, followed by a M.Sc. (majoring in Finance) in 1999. Wang joined Great Wall Motor in 1991 at the age of 21. In 2003, she became the chief executive (CEO) of Great Wall Motor.

In 2017, Wang was assessed as being the 62nd most powerful woman in the world by Forbes. In March 2018, speaking to the National People's Congress, she presented her views about the Great Wall Motor's aim to double their vehicle sales by 2025 to two million units annually, helped by the push from increased electric and hybrid plug-in car production.

In 2022, Wang resigned as vice chairman and general manager of Great Wall Motor. In 2023, she joined XPeng and was appointed as the company's president. In 2024, Wang was ranked the 29th most powerful woman in Asia by Fortune, which noted Xpeng's partnership with Volkswagen to co-develop EV systems and manage global supply chains.
