= Aspex =

Aspex Corporation
- Type: Publicly traded (Purchased by FEI Company 1/9/2012)
- Industry: Scientific and Technical Instruments
- Founded: 1992
- Headquarters: Delmont, Pennsylvania, United States
- Area served: global
- Key people: Harry Shimp, CEO; Greg Ott, President
- Products: Scanning electron microscope

'Aspex' Corporation, founded in 1992, is a supplier of electron microscopy tools to researchers, developers and manufacturers working on Process control through automated scanning electron microscope and energy-dispersive X-ray spectroscopy.

ASPEX specializes in the manufacturing integrated energy-dispersive X-ray spectroscopy and electron microscope. The company develops automated algorithms for routine production monitoring and control. Aspex's microanalysis solutions are seen in a wide range of production environments, including critical cleanliness, microcontamination analysis, product purity, contamination diagnostics, predictive maintenance, and other statistical process control initiatives. Aspex instruments are typically more industrialized than standard SEM equipment. They can be typically found installed in non-traditional locations, like steel mills and automotive assembly lines. The most common usage revolves around automated feature analysis for particle characterization.

== Market divisions ==
- Steel, which includes a broad range of steel producers and universities interested improving the production process through Non-metallic inclusions content control.
- Pharmaceuticals, which includes developers and manufacturers of pharmaceutical products, medical devices, and new drug delivery tools.
- Forensics, which includes institutes, universities, crime labs conducting various trace evidence applications and gunshot residue analysis.
- Military, which customized field deployable units to monitor jet engine wear debris and predictive maintenance on military aircraft.
- Automotive, which includes automotive suppliers and producers interested in characterizing the parts cleaning practices and the critical cleanliness of components and assemblies.

== Locations ==
Aspex Corporation maintains research and development and sales operations in Delmont, Pennsylvania.

== History ==
The origins of Aspex Corporation date back to 1992 (formally a division of RJ Lee Group, Inc.) where developers recognized the limitations and costs associated with traditional scanning electron microscopy (SEM). As a result, the company developed and introduced the world's first "personalized" SEM, or PSEM. The timing of the introduction coincided with a number of important trends, including increased emphasis on materials characterization, the outsourcing of R&D applications to service laboratories, and the "quality revolution" of the 1990s. Since then, Aspex has continued to develop various industrialized SEMs for quality and process control purposes.

As of January 9, 2012, FEI Company purchased Aspex from its privately held venture capitalists. After one year of operating under the name "ASPEX, an FEI Company", in 2013 the stand-alone entity of ASPEX was absorbed by FEI and the electron microscopes produced in the Delmont, Pennsylvania facility are now grouped with the FEI offerings.

Although Aspex is not operating as a stand-alone business entity, the three product lines (Express, Explorer and, Extreme) are still available for purchase with their automated software. This enables the user to engage the SEM (with EDX, if equipped) to automatically scan an area of interest about a sample and collect particulate information. Such information includes: morphology, thumbnail image, chemistry (if EDX is equipped)

== Competitors ==
- TESCAN
- Carl Zeiss NTS GmbH
- Phenom-World B.V.
- Hitachi
- JEOL, Inc.
- Semtech solutions, Inc.
