= XPeng GX =

Full-size luxury SUV

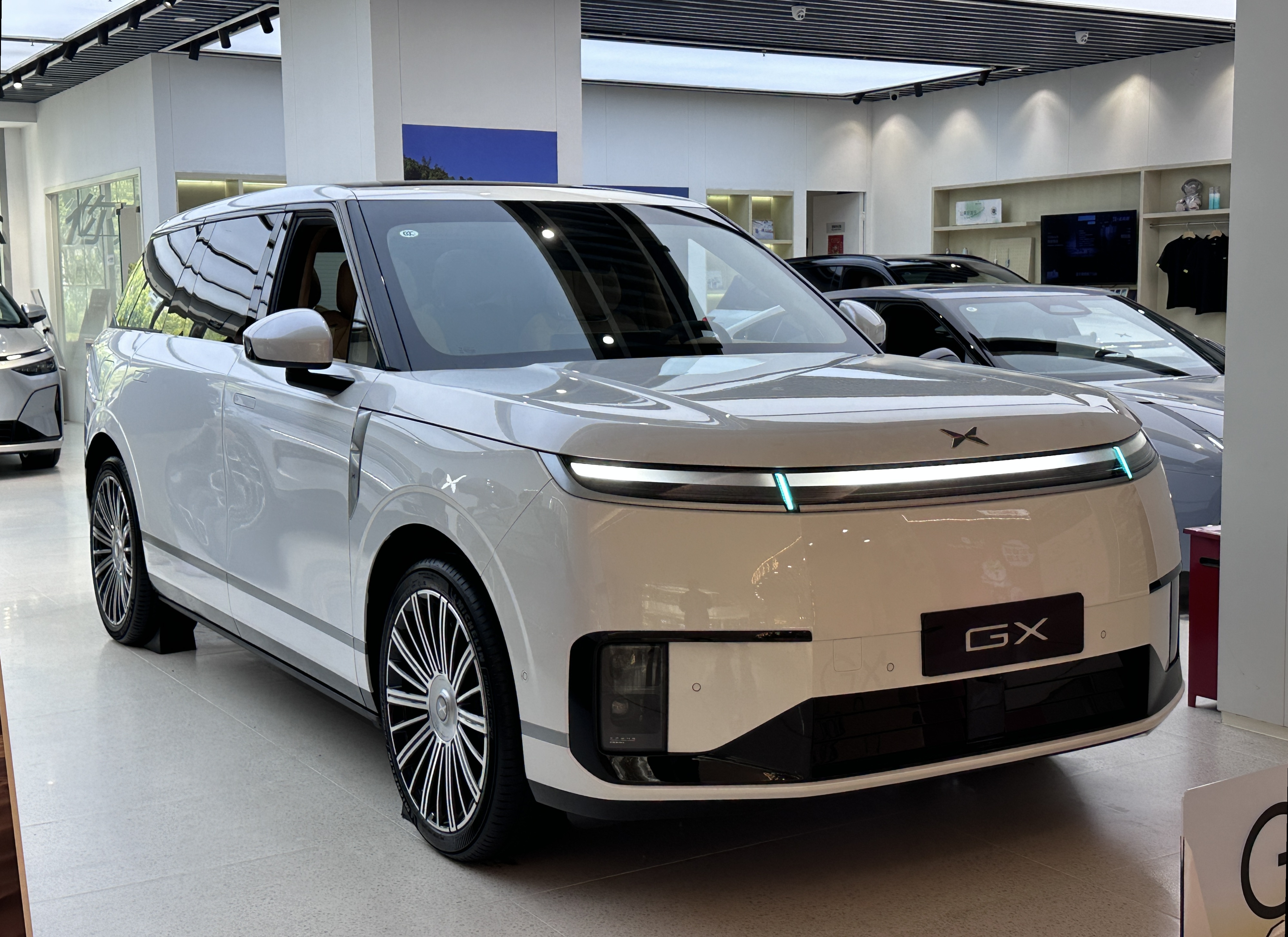

Overview
- Manufacturer: XPeng
- Model code: G01
- Production: March 2026 – present
- Assembly: China: Guangzhou

Body and chassis
- Class: Full-size luxury SUV (F)
- Body style: 5-door SUV
- Layout: Battery electric: Rear-motor, rear-wheel-drive; Dual-motor, all-wheel-drive; Range-extended EV: Front-engine, dual-motor, all-wheel-drive
- Platform: SEPA 3.0

Powertrain
- Engine: Petrol range extender: 1.5 L DAM15NTE turbocharged I4
- Electric motor: Luxshare TZ230XY01G01X (rear); XPeng YS230XY01G01X (AWD front)
- Power output: 362–577 hp (270–430 kW; 367–585 PS)
- Hybrid drivetrain: Series (range extender)
- Battery: 63.3 kWh CALB LFP; 91.9 kWh CALB LFP; 110 kWh NMC CALB
- Range: 1,585 km (985 mi) (EREV, CLTC)
- Electric range: 635–750 km (395–466 mi) (EV, CLTC); 320 km (199 mi) (EREV, WLTP); 430 km (267 mi) (EREV, CLTC)

Dimensions
- Wheelbase: 3,115 mm (122.6 in)
- Length: 5,265 mm (207.3 in)
- Width: 1,999 mm (78.7 in)
- Height: 1,800 mm (70.9 in)
- Curb weight: 2,690–2,820 kg (5,930–6,217 lb) (EV); 2,840–2,890 kg (6,261–6,371 lb) (EREV)

The XPeng GX (Chinese: 小鹏GX; pinyin: Xiǎopéng GX) is battery electric and range-extended full-size luxury SUV produced by XPeng since March 2026.

== Overview ==
In an interview from May 2025, XPeng CEO He Xiaopeng revealed that XPeng would present 3 models that year. The GX, then known by its model code, G01, was one of the models, alongside the second-generation P7 and the G7. The first spyshots of the GX surfaced 3 months prior on February 12, 2025, and the GX was initially expected to be revealed in the second half of 2025. It will have 6 seats with a 2+2+2 configuration.

The GX was officially unveiled via Weibo on February 5, 2026. The X in the model name stands for "eXploration" as said by Xpeng's CEO. The price of the GX is yet to be determined but it was previously expected to cost ¥400,000 (around $54,700).

The GX entered production on March 19, 2026. In May the company announced that the platform would form the basis for its robotaxi initiative.

=== Design ===
The A and B pillars of the GX are slanted. Split headlights are utilized at the front. A single light bar is used on the upper part of the tailgate. The GX rides on chrome-plated wheels of unknown size. Retractable door handles are used despite the upcoming ban on said type of car door handle beginning in 2027. XPeng also included sculpted air channels in the design of the GX. The GX has a drag coefficient of 0.255 C_{d}.

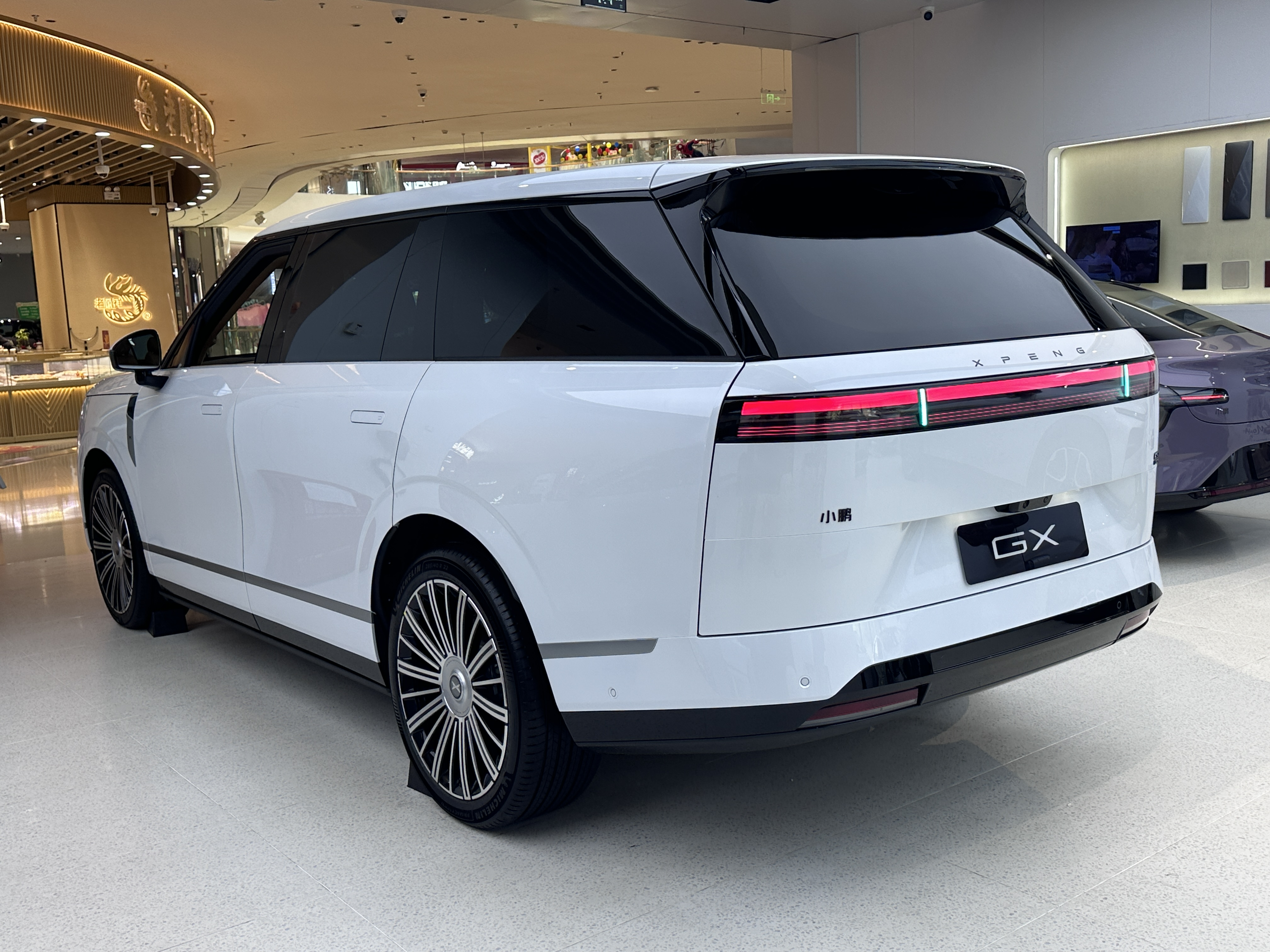
Rear view

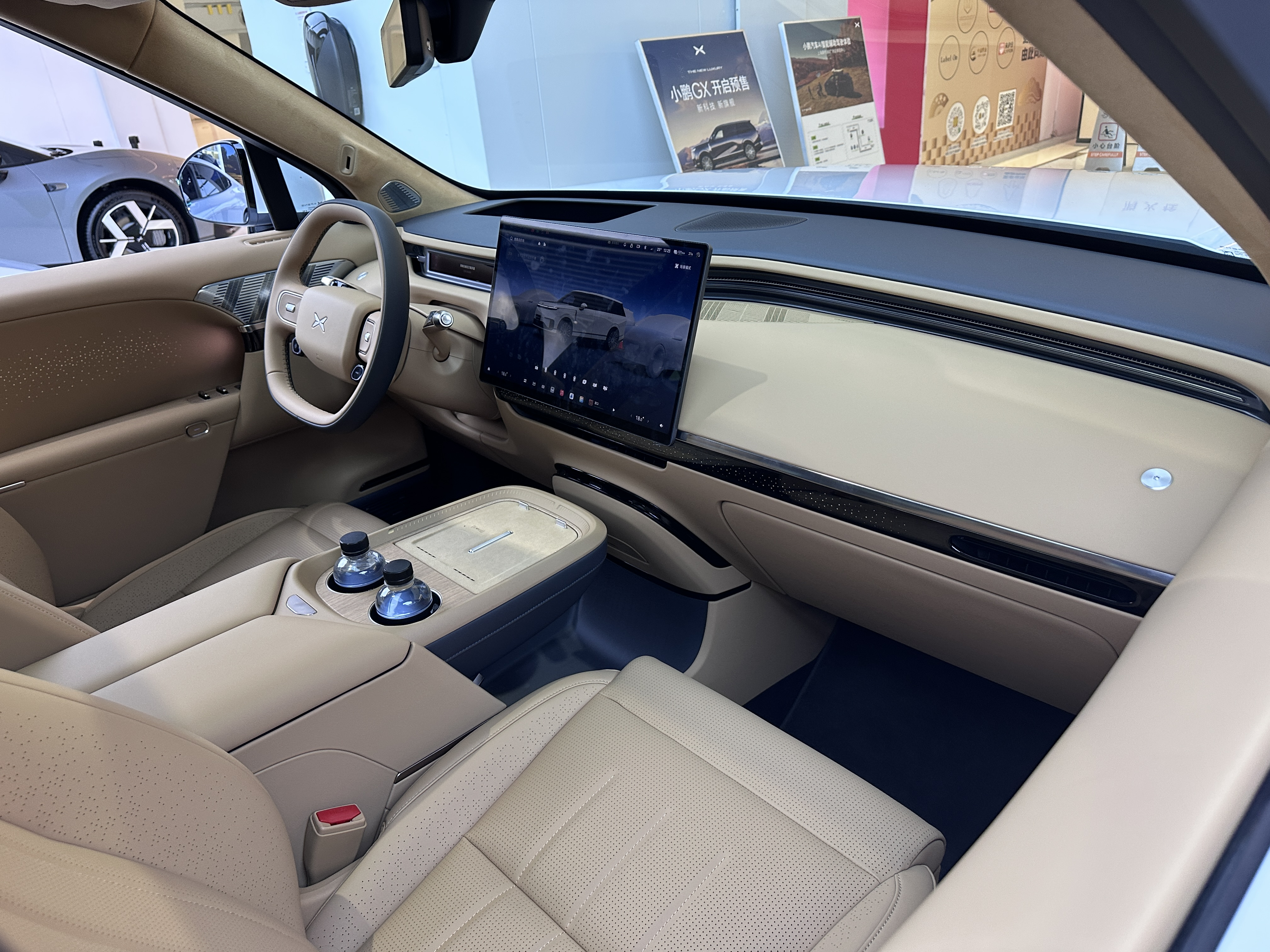
Interior

=== Features ===
The seats of the GX were co-developed with Nissan and are expected to be similar to that of the company's Zero Gravity seats. Entertainment screens and a built-in refrigerator are also expected to be utilized in the second row. The GX will utilize rear-wheel steering and a steer-by-wire system. It will also utilize the company's Turing chips as well as Xpeng's second generation VLA model and a built-in VLM. Dual-chamber air suspension is also expected be used.

== Powertrain ==
The GX uses Xpeng's Kunpeng Super Electric System that applies an 800-volt electrical architecture. It will be able to charge from 10% to 80% in around 12 minutes. Electric range was expected to be up to 430 kilometres (267 mi) with overall range expected to be up to 1,400 kilometres (870 mi). The aforementioned Kunpeng Super Electric System was co-developed with the Harbin Dongan Auto Engine Company, a subsidiary of Changan Automobile.

Battery electric models have a curb weight ranging from 2,690 kilograms (5,930 lb) to 2,820 kilograms (6,217 lb) with range-extended models having a curb weight between 2,840 kilograms (6,261 lb) and 2,890 kilograms (6,371 lb).

=== Battery electric ===
Battery electric models are available in both rear-wheel-drive and all-wheel-drive. Rear-wheel-drive EV models are powered by an electric motor codenamed TZ230XY01G01X producing 362 horsepower (270 kW; 367 PS) made by Luxshare. All-wheel-drive versions add a second motor to the front, this time codenamed YS230XY01G01E and made by XPeng itself, adding 215 hp (160 kW; 218 PS) for a total output of 577 horsepower (430 kW; 585 PS). It can be paired with two battery pack options both supplied by CALB: 91.9 kWh LFP offering 655 and 635 km (407 and 395 mi) of range, and a 110 kWh NMC pack offering 750 or 720 km (466 or 447 mi) of range for rear-wheel drive and all-wheel drive, respectively.

=== Range-extended ===
Range-extended models will only be available in all-wheel-drive. They use a 63.3 kWh CALB lithium iron phosphate battery and have an electric range of 320 kilometres (199 mi). A 1.5-liter turbocharged inline-four petrol engine codenamed DAM15NTE serves as a generator and produces 148 hp (110 kW; 150 PS). As with the battery electric all-wheel-drive version, the range-extended models will have a total power output of 577 hp (430 kW; 585 PS).

Specifications
Model	Battery		Power	Torque	Electric range		Top speed	Kerb weight
Model	Type	Weight	Power	Torque	WLTP	CLTC	Top speed	Kerb weight
EREV	63.3 kWh LFP CALB	451 kg (994 lb)	496 hp (370 kW; 503 PS)	695 N⋅m (513 lb⋅ft)	320 km (199 mi)	430 km (267 mi)	200 km/h (120 mph)	2,840–2,890 kg (6,261–6,371 lb)
EV	91.9 kWh LFP CALB	650 kg (1,433 lb)	362 hp (270 kW; 367 PS)	465 N⋅m (343 lb⋅ft)	—	635–665 km (395–413 mi)		2,690–2,750 kg (5,930–6,063 lb)
EV	110 kWh NMC CALB	620 kg (1,367 lb)	577 hp (430 kW; 585 PS)	695 N⋅m (513 lb⋅ft)	—	720–750 km (447–466 mi)	200 km/h (120 mph)	2,785–2,820 kg (6,140–6,217 lb)

== Sales ==
Within 12 hours of its launch on 20 May 2026, the GX received 24,863 firm orders. This caused delivery wait times to reach up to 35 weeks in June 2026, causing XPeng to expand the production lines in reaction. On 17 September 2026, XPeng reported that over 25,000 GXs had been delivered in the previous 4 months since launch, and that orders from the Middle East region exceeded 3,000 units.
