= Phenom (electron microscope) =

Electron microscope

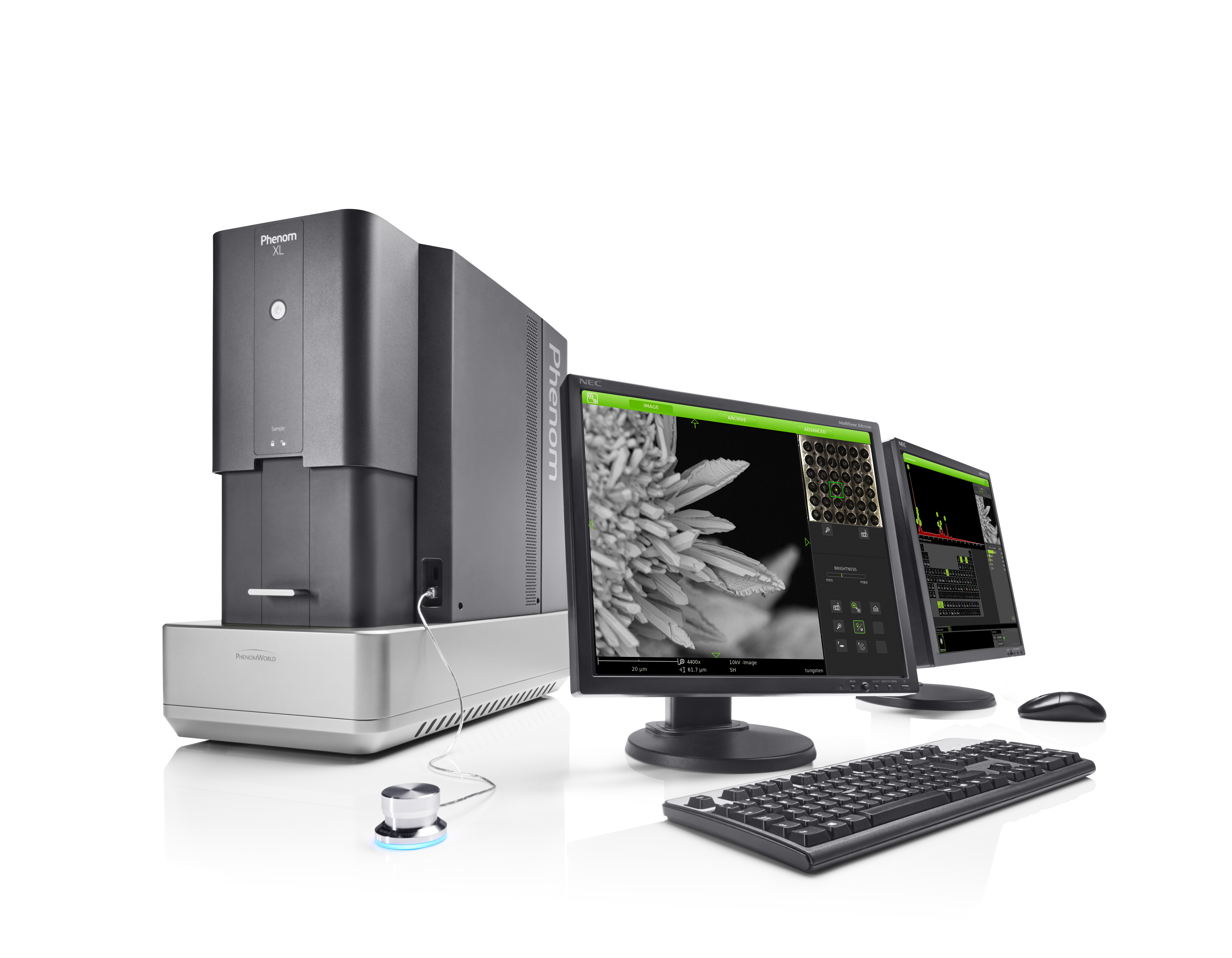
Phenom electron microscope

Phenom is a small, table-top sized scanning electron microscope (SEM) originally developed by Philips and FEI and further developed by Phenom-World.

== Features ==
The microscope features a combination of optical and electron-optical images; the optical image enables a "Neverlost" function so operators may navigate to any point on the sample. Sample loading takes place in four seconds (to obtain the CMOS overview image) and 30 seconds into the vacuum space via rapid transfer technology (no conventional load lock).

The Phenom system user interface is controlled with a touch screen. It achieves magnifications of up to 100,000 times with a resolution of down to 15 nm. An optional fully integrated X-ray analysis (EDS) system shows the composition of the sample in a few seconds.

== Gallery ==
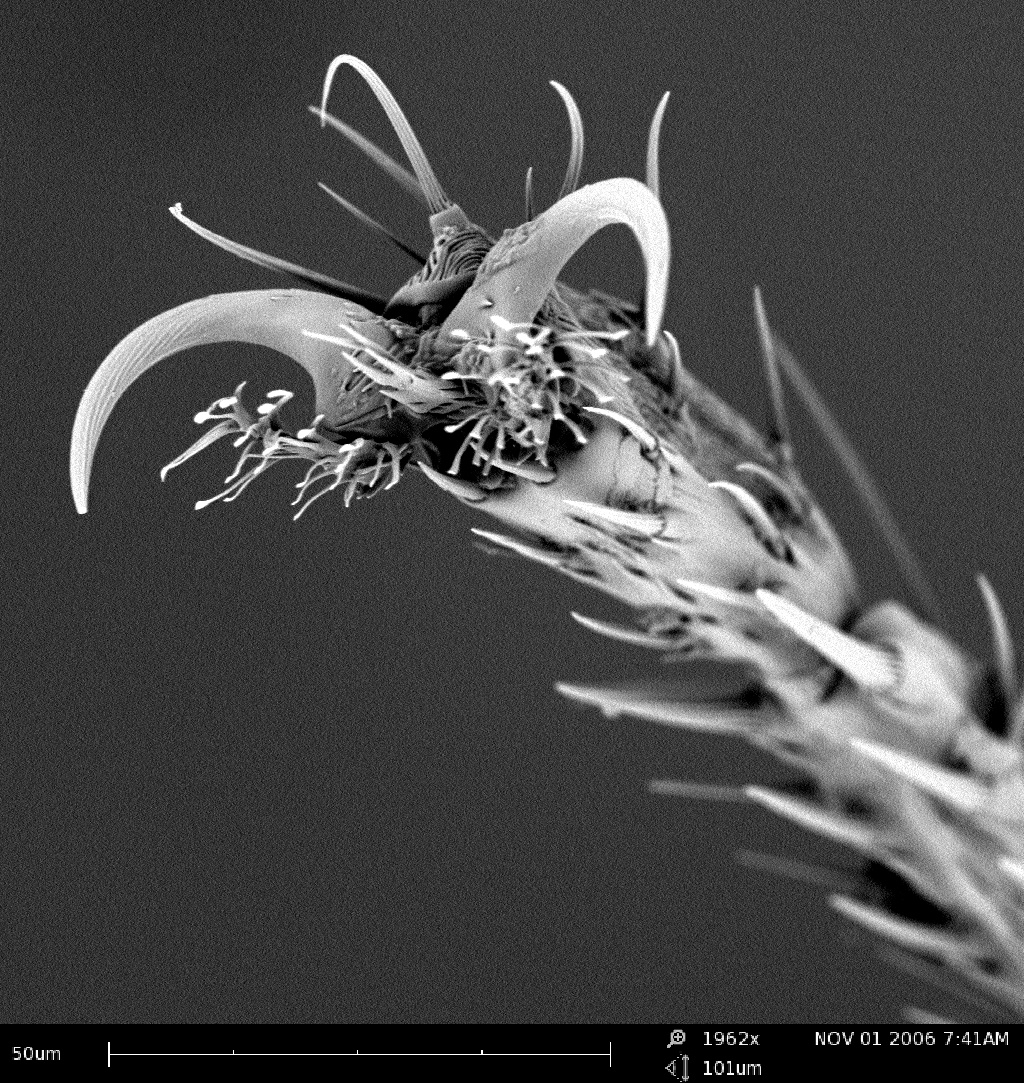
The leg of a fruit fly imaged with the Phenom. Field of view is 101 um.

Diatoms imaged with the Phenom. Field of view is 50 um.
