= List of foreign brand vehicles made by automobile manufacturers of China =

Chinese automotive companies have manufactured vehicles that carry foreign brands. These include vehicles originally developed and manufactured by Chinese manufacturers but sold under foreign brand, or vehicles developed and manufactured by the joint venture partners of Chinese side, or vehicles that use key technologies developed by Chinese manufacturers, even if they are marketed under a foreign badge.

== BMW ==
=== Mini ===
- Mini Cooper E/SE (J01) (2023–present), subcompact hatchback, developed and manufactured by Spotlight Automotive (50-50 JV with GWM)
- Mini Aceman (2024–present), subcompact SUV, developed and manufactured by Spotlight Automotive (50-50 JV with GWM)

== Ford Motor Company ==
=== Ford ===
- Ford Territory (China) (2018–2023), compact SUV, rebadged JMC Yusheng S330, manufactured by JMC-Ford, exported as second generation of Territory
- Ford Equator Sport (2021–present), compact SUV, developed and manufactured by JMC-Ford, exported as third generation of Territory
- Ford Equator (2021–present), mid-size SUV, developed and manufactured by JMC-Ford
- Ford Bronco New Energy (2025–present), mid-size SUV, developed and manufactured by JMC-Ford
- Ford Transit City (2026–present), van, developed based on JMC E-Fushun, manufactured by JMC-Ford
- Unnamed compact SUV, developed based on Geely's GEA platform in 2028

=== Lincoln ===
- Lincoln Aviator EX8 (to commence), mid-size SUV, developed and manufactured by Changan-Ford

== General Motors ==
=== Chevrolet ===
- Chevrolet Aveo / Chevrolet Sail / Chevrolet Optra (2023–present), subcompact car, developed and manufactured by SGMW
- Chevrolet Captiva (second generation) (2019–present), compact SUV, rebadged Baojun 530, manufactured by SGMW
- Chevrolet Captiva PHEV/EV (2025–present), compact SUV, rebadged Wuling Starlight S, manufactured by SGMW
- Chevrolet Optra (2011–2024), compact car, rebadged Baojun 630, manufactured by SGMW
- Chevrolet Groove (first generation) (2020–2025), subcompact SUV, rebadged Baojun 510, manufactured by SGMW
- Chevrolet Groove (second generation) (2025–present), subcompact SUV, rebadged Wuling Xingchi, manufactured by SGMW
- Chevrolet N200 (2008–2022), microvan, rebadged Wuling Hongtu, manufactured by SGMW
- Chevrolet N300/Move (2010–present), microvan, rebadged Wuling Rongguang, manufactured by SGMW
- Chevrolet Enjoy (2013–2017), microvan, rebadged Wuling Hongguang, manufactured by SGMW
- Chevrolet N400/Tornado Van/Damas (2019–present), microvan, rebadged Wuling Hongguang V, manufactured by SGMW
- Chevrolet S10 Max/D-Max (2021–present), pickup truck, rebadged Maxus T60, manufactured by SAIC Maxus
- Chevrolet Express Max (2025–present), van, rebadged Maxus V70, manufactured by SAIC Maxus
- Chevrolet Spark EUV (2025–present), mini SUV, rebadged Baojun Yep Plus, manufactured by SGMW
- Chevrolet Spark EV (2022), city car, rebadged Wuling Air EV, manufactured by SGMW

== Honda ==
=== Everus ===
- Everus EA6 (2019), compact sedan, rebadged Aion S, manufactured by GAC Aion

=== Lingxi ===
- Lingxi L (2024–present), compact sedan, developed and manufactured by Dongfeng Honda

== KG Mobility ==
- Unnamed mid-size SUV, developed and supplied by Chery in 2026

== Mazda ==
- Mazda EZ-6/6e (2024–present), mid-size sedan, developed based on Deepal L07, manufactured by Changan Mazda
- Mazda EZ-60/CX-6e (2025–present), compact SUV, developed based on Deepal S07, manufactured by Changan Mazda

== Mitsubishi Motors ==
- Mitsubishi Airtrek (2021–2023), compact SUV, rebadged first generation Aion V, manufactured by GAC Aion
- Mitsubishi Eupheme EV (2017–2020), subcompact SUV, rebadged Trumpchi GE3, manufactured by GAC Group
- Mitsubishi Eupheme PHEV (2018), compact SUV, BEV, rebadged first generation Trumpchi GS4 PHEV, manufactured by GAC Group

== Nissan ==
=== Nissan ===
- Nissan NX8 (2026–present), mid-size SUV, developed and manufactured by Dongfeng Nissan
- Nissan NX7 (upcoming), mid-size SUV, developed and manufactured by Dongfeng Nissan
- Nissan N7/Primera (2025–present), mid-size sedan, developed and manufactured by Dongfeng Nissan
- Nissan N6 (2025–present), mid-size sedan, developed and manufactured by Dongfeng Nissan
- Nissan Frontier Pro/Navara Pro (2025–present), mid-size pickup truck, redesigned Dongfeng Z9, developed and manufactured by Zhengzhou Nissan
- Nissan Terrano PHEV (to commence), full-size SUV, redesigned M-Hero X700, developed and manufactured by M-Hero(Xiangyang)

=== Venucia ===
- Venucia E30 (2020–2022), city car, rebadged Dongfeng Nano EX1, manufactured by Dongfeng Nammi
- Venucia Xing (2020–present), compact SUV, developed and manufactured by Dongfeng Nissan
- Venucia V-Online (2021–present), compact SUV, developed and manufactured by Dongfeng Nissan
- Venucia VX6 (2023–present), compact SUV, developed and manufactured by Dongfeng Nissan

== Renault ==
=== Renault ===
- Renault City K-ZE/Kwid E-Tech (2019–2020, 2022–present), city car, rebadged Dongfeng Nano EX1, manufactured by Dongfeng Nammi
- Renault Grand Koleos/Koleos (2024–present), mid-size SUV, redesigned Geely Xingyue L
- Renault Filante (2026–present), mid-size coupe SUV, developed based on Geely Xingyue L

=== Dacia ===
- Dacia Spring (2021–present), city car, rebadged Dongfeng Nano EX1, manufactured by Dongfeng Nammi

=== Mobilize ===
- Mobilize Limo (2022–2023), compact sedan, rebadged JMEV Yi, manufactured by JMEV

== Stellantis ==
=== Citroën ===
- Citroën 2CV (upcoming), developed by Leapmotor

=== Dodge ===
- Dodge Journey (2021–2026), compact SUV, rebadged Trumpchi GS5
- Dodge Attitude (fourth generation) (2025–present), compact sedan, rebadged Trumpchi Empow

=== Fiat ===
- Fiat Titano (2024–present), redesigned Changan F70
- Fiat Koala (upcoming), developed by Leapmotor

=== Jeep ===
- Two unnamed models, developed and produced by Dongfeng in 2027

=== Opel ===
- Unnamed compact SUV, developed and supplied by Leapmotor in 2028

=== Peugeot ===
- Peugeot Landtrek (2021–present), redesigned Changan F70
- Two unnamed models, developed and produced by Dongfeng in 2027

=== Ram ===
- Ram 1200/Dakota (2024–present), redesigned Changan F70

=== Vauxhall ===
- Unnamed compact SUV, developed and supplied by Leapmotor in 2028

== Tata Group ==
=== Avinya ===
- Avinya X (upcoming), coupe SUV, developed based on Chery's E0X platform

=== Iveco ===
- Iveco Fidato (2023–present), van, redesigned Maxus V70, manufactured by SAIC Maxus

== Toyota ==
=== Toyota ===
- Toyota bZ3 (2023–present), compact sedan, developed and supplied by BYD, manufactured by FAW Toyota
- Toyota bZ3X (2025–present), compact SUV, developed based on second generation of Aion V, manufactured by GAC Toyota
- Toyota bZ5 (2025–present), compact SUV, developed and supplied by BYD, manufactured by FAW Toyota
- Toyota bZ7 (2026–present), full-size sedan, developed based on Hyptec A800, manufactured by GAC Toyota

=== Leahead ===
- Leahead iA5 (2018–2024), compact sedan, rebadged Aion S, manufactured by GAC Aion
- Leahead iX4 (2018–2019), compact SUV, BEV, rebadged first generation Trumpchi GS4 EV, manufactured by GAC Group

== Volkswagen Group ==
=== AUDI ===
- AUDI E5 (2025–present), mid-size station wagon, developed based on IM L6, manufactured by SAIC-VW
- AUDI E7X (2026–present), mid-size SUV, developed based on IM LS7, manufactured by SAIC-VW

=== Volkswagen ===
- Volkswagen ID. Era 9X (2026–present), full-size SUV, EREV, developed based on SAIC Motor's platform, manufactured by SAIC-VW
- Volkswagen ID. Era 8X (2026–present), mid-size SUV, EREV, manufactured by SAIC-VW
- Volkswagen ID. Era 5X (upcoming), compact SUV, BEV, developed based on XPeng's CEA electrical architecture on top of Volkswagen's CMP platform, manufactured by SAIC-VW
- Volkswagen ID. Era 5S (2026–present), mid-size sedan, PHEV, manufactured by SAIC-VW
- Volkswagen ID. Unyx 07 (2026–present), mid-size sedan, BEV, developed based on XPeng's CEA electrical architecture on top of Volkswagen's existing MEB platform, manufactured by Volkswagen Anhui
- Volkswagen ID. Unyx 08 (2026–present), full-size SUV, BEV, developed based on XPeng G9, manufactured by Volkswagen Anhui
- Volkswagen ID. Unyx 09 (2026–present), full-size sedan, BEV, developed based on XPeng P7, manufactured by Volkswagen Anhui
- Volkswagen ID. Aura L5 (upcoming), compact sedan, BEV, developed based on XPeng's CEA electrical architecture, manufactured by FAW-VW
- Volkswagen ID. Aura T6 (2026–present), mid-size SUV, BEV, developed based on XPeng's CEA electrical architecture on top of Volkswagen's existing MEB platform, manufactured by FAW-VW
- Volkswagen Amarok (South America, upcoming), full-size pick-up, redesigned Maxus Terron 9
- Volkswagen Tempest (2026–present), full-size van, redesigned Maxus V90, manufactured by SAIC Maxus
