= Volkswagen ID. Unyx 09 =

Battery electric full-size sedan

Overview
- Manufacturer: Volkswagen Anhui
- Production: 2026–present
- Assembly: China: Hefei (Volkswagen Anhui)

Body and chassis
- Class: Executive car (E)
- Body style: 4-door sedan
- Layout: Rear motor, rear-wheel drive; Dual-motor, all-wheel drive
- Related: XPeng P7

Powertrain
- Electric motor: 140 kW EFM induction (front); 230 kW EDF PMSM (rear)
- Power output: 309–496 hp (230–370 kW; 313–503 PS)
- Battery: 91.963 kWh LFP CATL
- Electric range: 705–755 km (438–469 mi) (CLTC)
- Plug-in charging: DC: 520 kW; V2L: 6 kW

Dimensions
- Wheelbase: 3,030 mm (119.3 in)
- Length: 5,081 mm (200.0 in)
- Width: 1,980 mm (78.0 in)
- Height: 1,509–1,526 mm (59.4–60.1 in)
- Curb weight: 2,207–2,307 kg (4,866–5,086 lb)

The Volkswagen ID. Unyx 09 (Chinese: 大众与众09; pinyin: Dàzhòng Yǔzhòng 09) is a battery electric executive sedan produced by Volkswagen under its ID. Unyx sub-brand. It is the second Volkswagen model co-developed with XPeng after the ID. Unyx 08.

== Overview ==
The ID. Unyx 09 was unveiled along side the ID. Aura T6 on 21 April 2026 at the Beijing Auto Show. It was launched on 24 October 2026. It is the fourth model under the Volkswagen ID. Unyx sub-brand, following the 06, 07 and 08.

The front features narrow inset DRL strips with a grid pattern flanking an illuminated VW logo, while the headlights form a black stripe that extends backwards 'through' the wheel well into the fender and ends in the front door, which is used to house ADAS sensors on the fender. The front also features a lower air intake flanked by three air scoops. It is equipped with DLP matrix headlights with optional pixel projector lighting which can project symbols and markings on the road surface such as lane markings, navigation instructions, the vehicle's width, and collision warnings.

It is equipped with double wishbone front and five-link independent rear suspension geometries, with ZF adaptive dampers capable of using the sensors to scan the road ahead and prepare for bumps, and optional Vibracoustic dual-chamber air suspension. It has Brembo four-piston double-sided fixed brake calipers and is equipped with 255 mm section Pirelli P Zero F1 tires.

The interior features an 8.88-inch digital instrument cluster supplemented by an 1080p-resolution 85-inch AR-HUD and 12,000 nits of brightness and a 15.6-inch central infotainment touchscreen, all powered by a Qualcomm Snapdragon 8295P SoC. It has a 1.74 m^{2} (18.7 sq ft) panoramic sunroof, a 20-speaker 7.1.4 surround sound system featuring driver's headrest speakers, and microfiber headliner, and optional UWB remote key. The seats have Nappa leather upholstery, with front and back rows coming with heating and power adjustment as standard, while the front seats also featuring ventilation and 10-point massaging. It has 481 litres (17.0 cu ft) of rear cargo space, which expands to 1,488 litres (52.5 cu ft) with the rear seats folded down.

It is equipped with an XPeng-supplied VLA ADAS system capable of supervised Level 2 autonomous driving in highway and urban conditions. It uses a sensor suite consisting of three 4D mmWave radars, 11 cameras, and 12 ultrasonic sensors, and is powered by XPeng's Turing chip capable of 750 TOPS.

Rear view

Interior

=== Powertrain ===
The Unyx 09 is available exclusively as a battery electric vehicle with either rear-wheel drive or dual-motor all-wheel drive.

All variants are equipped with a rear permanent magnet synchronous motor outputting 309 hp (230 kW; 313 PS) and 465 N⋅m (343 lb⋅ft) of torque. All-wheel drive variants add a front induction motor outputting 188 hp (140 kW; 191 PS) and 230 N⋅m (170 lb⋅ft) of torque, for a total of 496 hp (370 kW; 503 PS) and 695 N⋅m (513 lb⋅ft) of torque.

The Unyx 09 is available exclusively with a 91.963 kWh LFP battery pack supplied by CATL and is equipped with 800-volt class power electronics, and provides CLTC range ratings of 755 and 705 kilometres (469 and 438 mi) for rear- and all-wheel drive variants, respectively. It is capable of a peak charging rate of 520 kW, allowing for a 30–80% recharge time of 10 minutes or 250 kilometres (155 mi) in 5 minutes.

Specifications
Model	Battery		Motor		Power	Torque	Range	0–100 km/h (62 mph)	Top speed	Kerb weight
Model	Type	Weight	Front	Rear	Power	Torque	CLTC	0–100 km/h (62 mph)	Top speed	Kerb weight
RWD	91.963 kWh Shenxing LFP CATL	664 kg (1,464 lb)	—	230 kW EDF PMSM	309 hp (230 kW; 313 PS)	465 N⋅m (343 lb⋅ft)	755 km (469 mi)	6.8 s	200 km/h (124 mph)	2,207 kg (4,866 lb)
AWD	91.963 kWh Shenxing LFP CATL	664 kg (1,464 lb)	140 kW EFM induction	230 kW EDF PMSM	496 hp (370 kW; 503 PS)	695 N⋅m (513 lb⋅ft)	705 km (438 mi)	4.6 s	200 km/h (124 mph)	2,307 kg (5,086 lb)
