= Volkswagen ID. Unyx =

The Volkswagen ID. Unyx (Chinese: 大众ID. 与众; pinyin: Dàzhòng ID. Yǔzhòng) is a series of battery electric vehicles sold under the eponymous sub-brand and produced by Volkswagen under its Volkswagen Anhui joint venture co-owned with JAC Group.

ID. Unyx models are distinguished from other Volkswagen models by a gold Volkswagen logo and are exclusively available in China.

== Models ==
- Volkswagen ID. Unyx 06, originally without a number, rebadged Cupra Tavascan (since 2024)
- Volkswagen ID. Unyx 07, mid-size 4-door sedan (since January 2026)
- Volkswagen ID. Unyx 08, full-size 5-door crossover SUV (since March 2026, previewed by the ID. Evo concept in April 2025)
- Volkswagen ID. Unyx 09, full-size 4-door sedan (since September 2026, previewed by a concept of the same name in April 2026)
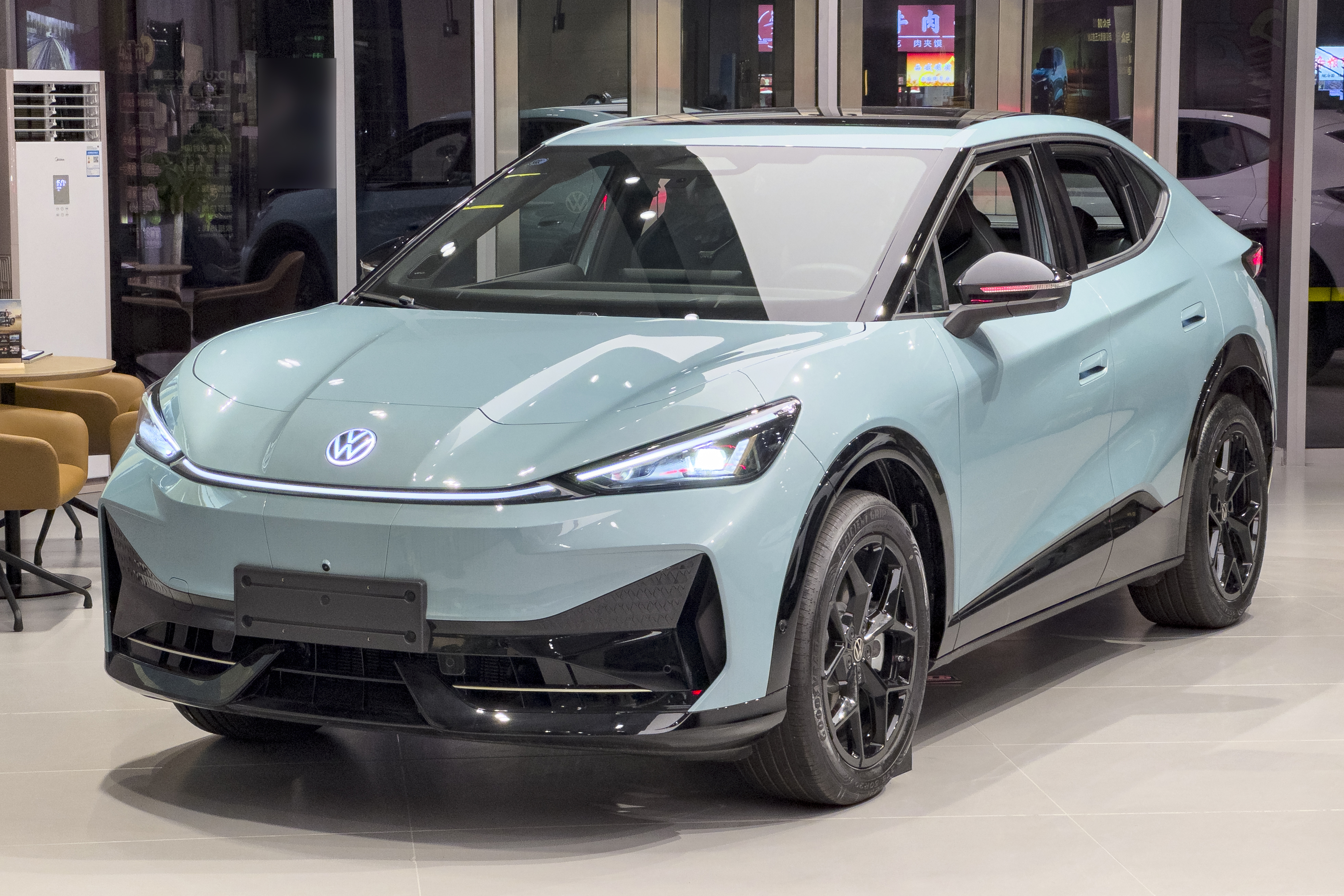
ID. Unyx 06

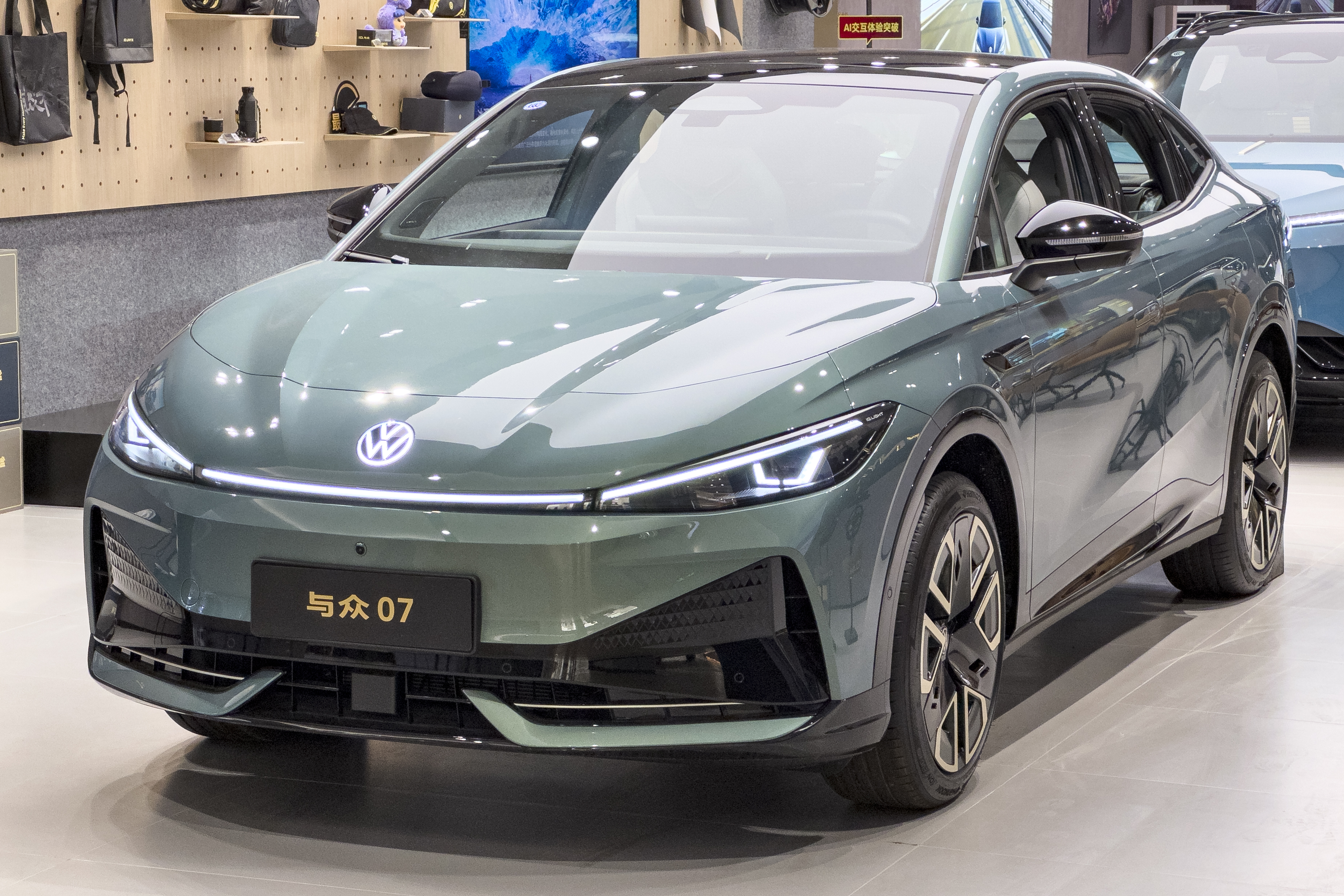
ID. Unyx 07

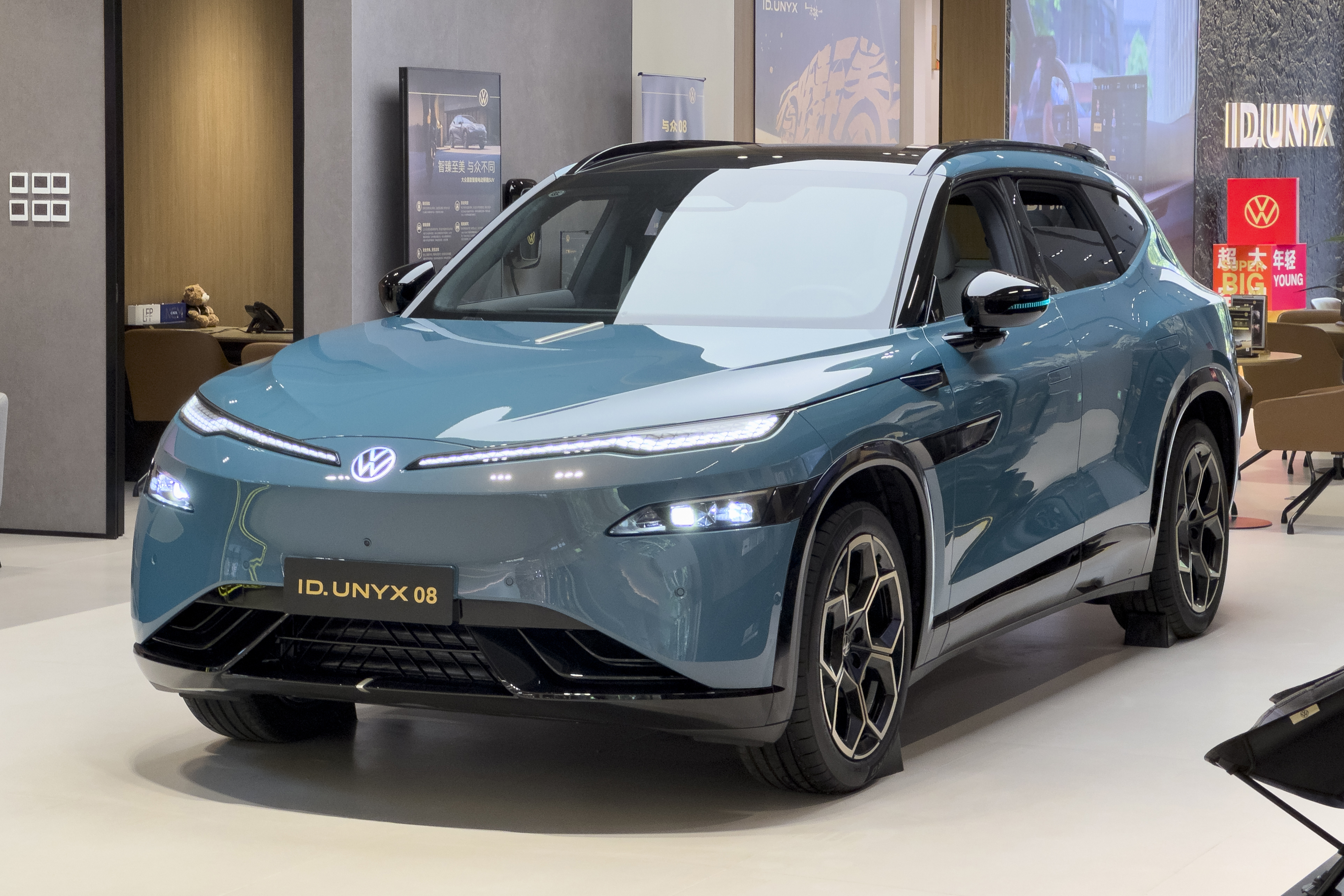
ID. Unyx 08

ID. Unyx 09

== See also ==
- Volkswagen ID. series
- Volkswagen ID. Aura of FAW-Volkswagen
- Volkswagen ID. Era of SAIC Volkswagen
