= XPeng G9 =

Battery electric mid-size crossover SUV

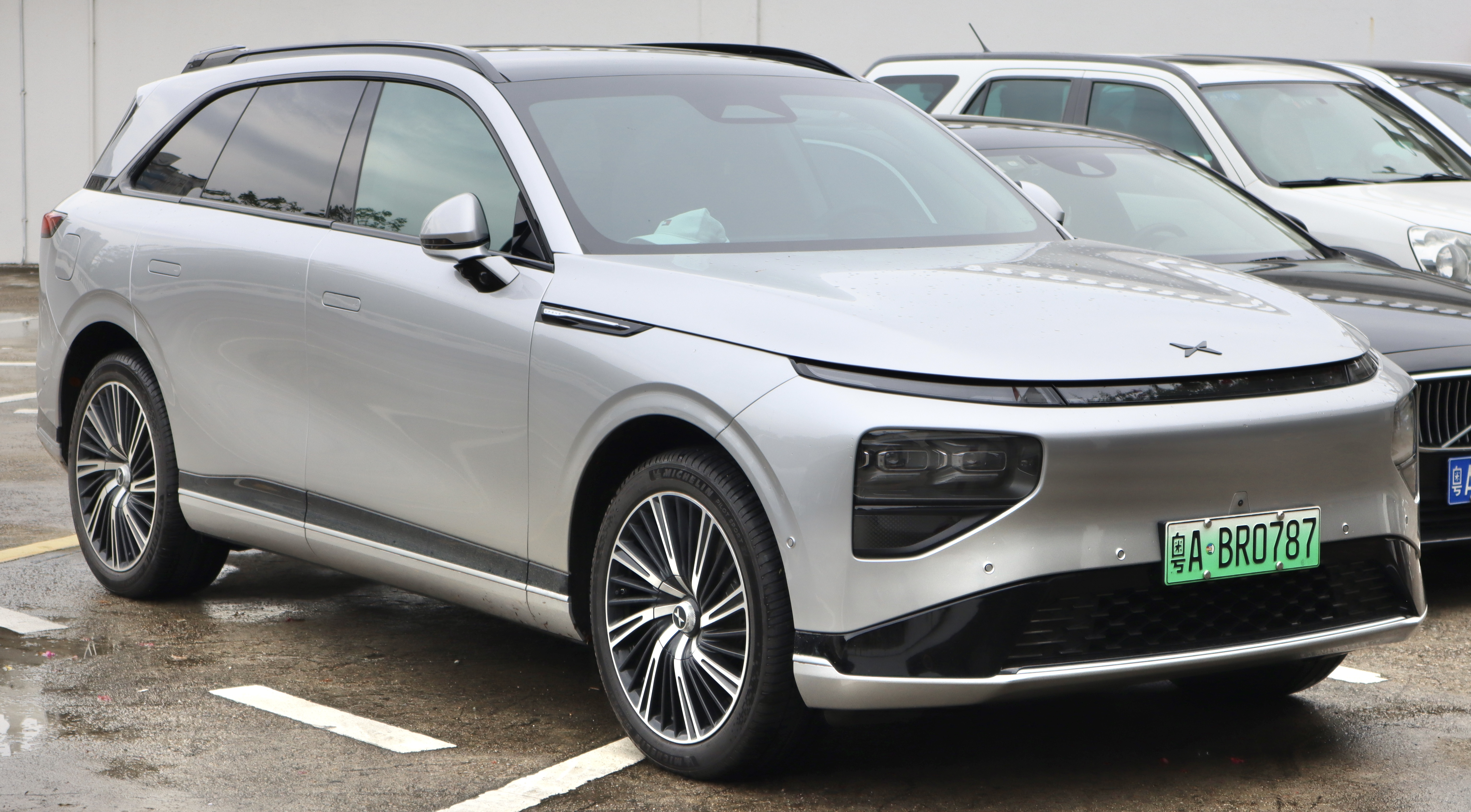

Overview
- Manufacturer: XPeng
- Production: 2022–present
- Assembly: China: Guangzhou, Guangdong; Austria: Graz (Magna Steyr)
- Designer: Yi Dong; Vojtěch Stránský

Body and chassis
- Class: Mid-size crossover SUV
- Body style: 5-door SUV
- Layout: Rear-motor, rear-wheel drive; Dual-motor, all-wheel-drive
- Platform: Edward
- Related: Volkswagen ID. Unyx 08

Powertrain
- Electric motor: AC induction, permanent magnet synchronous
- Power output: 308–567 hp (230–423 kW; 312–575 PS)
- Transmission: 1-speed direct-drive reduction
- Battery: 78.2 kWh LFP EVE Energy; 79 kWh LFP CALB; 93.1 kWh LFP CALB; 98 kWh NMC CALB
- Electric range: 580–725 km (360–450 mi) (CLTC)
- Plug-in charging: 319-530 kW DC

Dimensions
- Wheelbase: 2,998 mm (118.0 in)
- Length: 4,891 mm (192.6 in)
- Width: 1,937 mm (76.3 in)
- Height: 1,670–1,680 mm (65.7–66.1 in)
- Curb weight: 2,190–2,435 kg (4,828–5,368 lb)

The XPeng G9 (Chinese: 小鹏G9; pinyin: Xiǎopéng G9; stylized as G9) is a battery electric mid-size crossover SUV manufactured by Chinese electric car company XPeng. The G9 was unveiled in November 2021 during the Guangzhou Auto Show and was officially launched in China in the third quarter of 2022. The G9 is the first XPeng product to be conceived and designed from the outset for both domestic Chinese and international markets.

== Overview ==
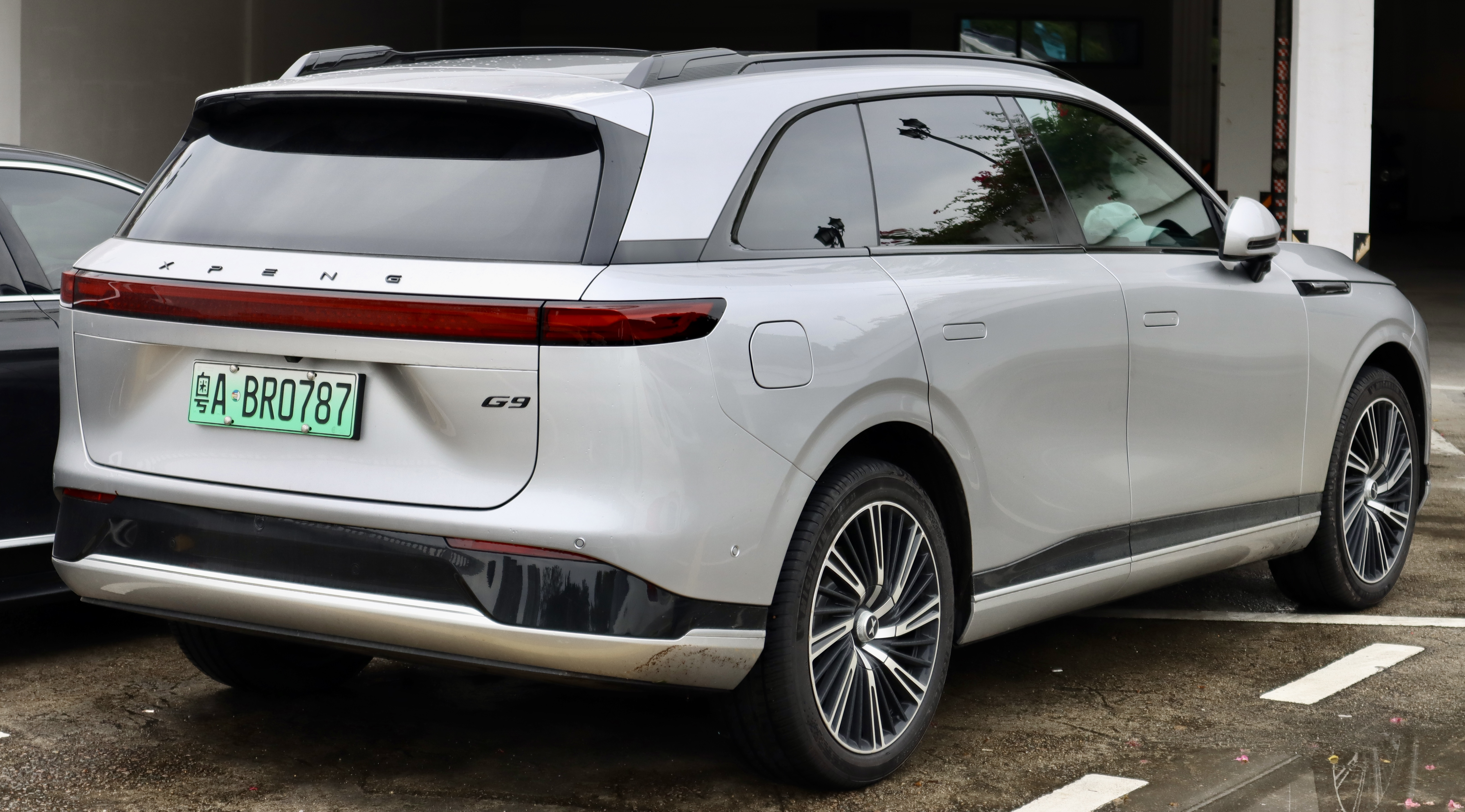
Rear view

The XPeng G9 is a 4th product, following the G3 compact crossover, P7 mid-size sedan, and P5 compact sedan. The G9 complies with 5-star safety design standards under new car assessment programs in China and the European Union, as well as the EU's vehicle certification standards known as European Whole Vehicle Type Approval, making the vehicle the first XPeng model to be designed with foreign markets in mind. The G9 also meets the EU's environmental protection requirements, with a reusability rate of more than 85 percent and a recyclable rate exceeding 95 percent, according to XPeng.

The XPeng G9 has been developed using the same platform as the P7, for this reason, the wheelbase of both cars will be very similar, between 3 and 3.10 metres (3,000.0 and 3,100.0 mm; 118.1 and 122.0 in). Specifically, the XPeng G9 aims to compete directly against models such as the Tesla Model Y, the Nio ES7 and the Li One from Li Auto (based on the wheelbase, 3,000–3,100 mm will be directly competitive for Nio ES8 3,010 mm and Li One 3,010 mm).

The XPeng G9 is equipped with the centralized electronic and electrical architecture of XPeng and XPilot 4.0 advanced driver-assistance system in terms of advanced driver-assistance system (ADAS). The G9 is based on XPeng's own SiC dedicated EV platform making it compatible with the next-generation X-Power superchargers by XPeng for charging up to 200 kilometres (124 mi) in 5 minutes via the 800 volt architecture. The G9 is built on two Nvidia Drive Orin systems-on-a-chip capable of 508 TOPS and delivers AI capabilities that Xmart OS could be continuously upgraded with each over-the-air update. It has the hardware capable of L4 autonomous driving. The G9 uses an 8 million pixel front-view camera and 2.9 megapixel cameras to cover the left and right sides of the vehicle as well as the front and rear views, with lidar sensors embedded in the headlights.

The G9 shares its platform with Volkswagen's ID. Unyx 08.

=== 2025 refresh ===
The G9 received significant updates, including to its powertrain and ADAS system, on 6 March 2025. The exterior remains largely the same, but is now available with a Midnight Knight aesthetic package, new wheel rim options, and soft-close doors. The interior has a new Moon Shadow-Coffee color option, and the infotainment system now uses a Qualcomm Snapdragon 8295P SoC. The ADAS system has been upgraded to XPeng's latest Turing Ai system, first seen in the P7+ and notably does not use LiDAR sensors, instead relying on three 4D mmWave radars and 11 cameras using LOFIC technology. The G9's powertrain gets a major update, with the use of new battery packs capable 5C charging for 10–80% in 12 minutes on all variants. Additionally, the motors have been revised and output more power, and range ratings see a slight boost.

=== 2026 update ===
On 8 January 2026, XPeng updated the G9, giving it access to the company's latest ADAS system and infotainment software. The exterior is now available in a matte New Moon Silver paint option. It is now available with up to three of XPeng's self-developed Turing AI chips for up to 2250 TOPS of computing performance, allowing for use of the latest VLA model resulting in AEB and AES functionality at up to 130 km/h (81 mph). The infotainment system has been updated to the latest AIOS 6.0 infotainment software which integrates the company's latest AI assistants and features a new ADAS user interface, available to previous models via OTA update.

== Specifications ==
The G9 is available with rear-wheel drive or dual-motor all-wheel drive powertrains. The base variant is driven by a 308 hp (230 kW; 312 PS) rear motor, and powered is supplied by a 78.2 kWh LFP battery pack supplied by EVE Energy providing a CLTC range of 570 km (354 mi). The battery has a peak charge rate of 260 kW, giving it 3C charging for 10–80% in 20 minutes. It can be upgraded with a larger 98 kWh NMC pack supplied by CALB providing 702 km (436 mi) of CLTC range, with a peak charge rate of 315 kW also giving it 3C charging for 10–80% in 20 minutes. The all-wheel drive version adds a 235 hp (175 kW; 238 PS) front induction motor for a total of 536 hp (400 kW; 543 PS), allowing for a claimed 0–100 km/h (62 mph) time of 3.9 seconds.

The G9's powertrain was upgraded in 2025, with increased power, range, and charging speeds. The batteries are now both LFP packs supplied CALB, and both are capable of 5C charging for 10–80% in 12 minutes. Power output of rear-wheel and all-wheel drive models increase to 346 and 567 hp (258 and 423 kW; 351 and 575 PS), respectively. Range of each variant increased, with the base variant seeing the biggest increase of 55 km (34 mi) to 625 km (388 mi) CLTC.

Specifications
Variant	Battery	Year	Motor		Power	Torque	Range		DCFC		0–100 km/h (62 mph) time	Top speed	Kerb weight
Variant	Battery	Year	Front	Rear	Power	Torque	CLTC	WLTP	Peak	10–80% time	0–100 km/h (62 mph) time	Top speed	Kerb weight
570 Pro/Max	78.2 kWh LFP EVE Energy	2022–24	—	230 kW TZ220XSEDM220 permanent magnet synchronous	308 hp (230 kW; 312 PS)	430 N⋅m (317 lb⋅ft)	570 km (354 mi)	460 km (286 mi)	260 kW	20 min	6.4 s	200 km/h (124 mph)	2,230 kg (4,916 lb)
702 Pro/Max	98 kWh NMC CALB	2022–24	—	230 kW TZ220XSEDM220 permanent magnet synchronous	308 hp (230 kW; 312 PS)	430 N⋅m (317 lb⋅ft)	702 km (436 mi)	570 km (354 mi)	315 kW	20 min	6.4 s	200 km/h (124 mph)	2,205 kg (4,861 lb)
650 Pro/Max	98 kWh NMC CALB	2022–24	175 kW YS220XSEP30 AC induction	230 kW TZ220XSEDM220 permanent magnet synchronous	536 hp (400 kW; 543 PS)	717 N⋅m (529 lb⋅ft)	650 km (404 mi)	520 km (323 mi)	315 kW	20 min	3.9 s	200 km/h (124 mph)	2,355 kg (5,192 lb)
625 Max	79 kWh LFP CALB	2025–present	—	258 kW TZ230XY01E38B permanent magnet synchronous	346 hp (258 kW; 351 PS)	465 N⋅m (343 lb⋅ft)	625 km (388 mi)	502 km (312 mi)	445 kW	12 min	6.6 s	200 km/h (124 mph)	2,196 kg (4,841 lb)
725 Max	93.1 kWh LFP CALB	2025–present	—	258 kW TZ230XY01E38B permanent magnet synchronous	346 hp (258 kW; 351 PS)	465 N⋅m (343 lb⋅ft)	725 km (450 mi)	585 km (364 mi)	530 kW	12 min	6.4 s	200 km/h (124 mph)	2,285 kg (5,038 lb)
680 AWD Max	93.1 kWh LFP CALB	2025–present	165 kW YS230XY01E38B AC induction	258 kW TZ230XY01E38B permanent magnet synchronous	567 hp (423 kW; 575 PS)	695 N⋅m (513 lb⋅ft)	680 km (423 mi)	540 km (336 mi)	530 kW	12 min	4.2 s	200 km/h (124 mph)	2,378 kg (5,243 lb)

== Safety ==
Euro NCAP test results XPeng G9 (LHD) (2023)
Test	Points	%
Overall:	5 /5 stars	
Adult occupant:	34.3	85%
Child occupant:	42	85%
Pedestrian:	49.5	78%
Safety assist:	14.1	78%

C-NCAP (2021) test results 2023 XPeng G9 702 Pro
Category		%
Overall:	5 /5 stars	89.6%
Occupant protection:		92.62%
Vulnerable road users:		67.05%
Active safety:		95.75%

== Sales ==
Year	China
2022	6,373
2023	27,820
2024	21,688
2025	19,634
