= Volkswagen ID. Unyx 07 =

Battery electric mid-size sedan

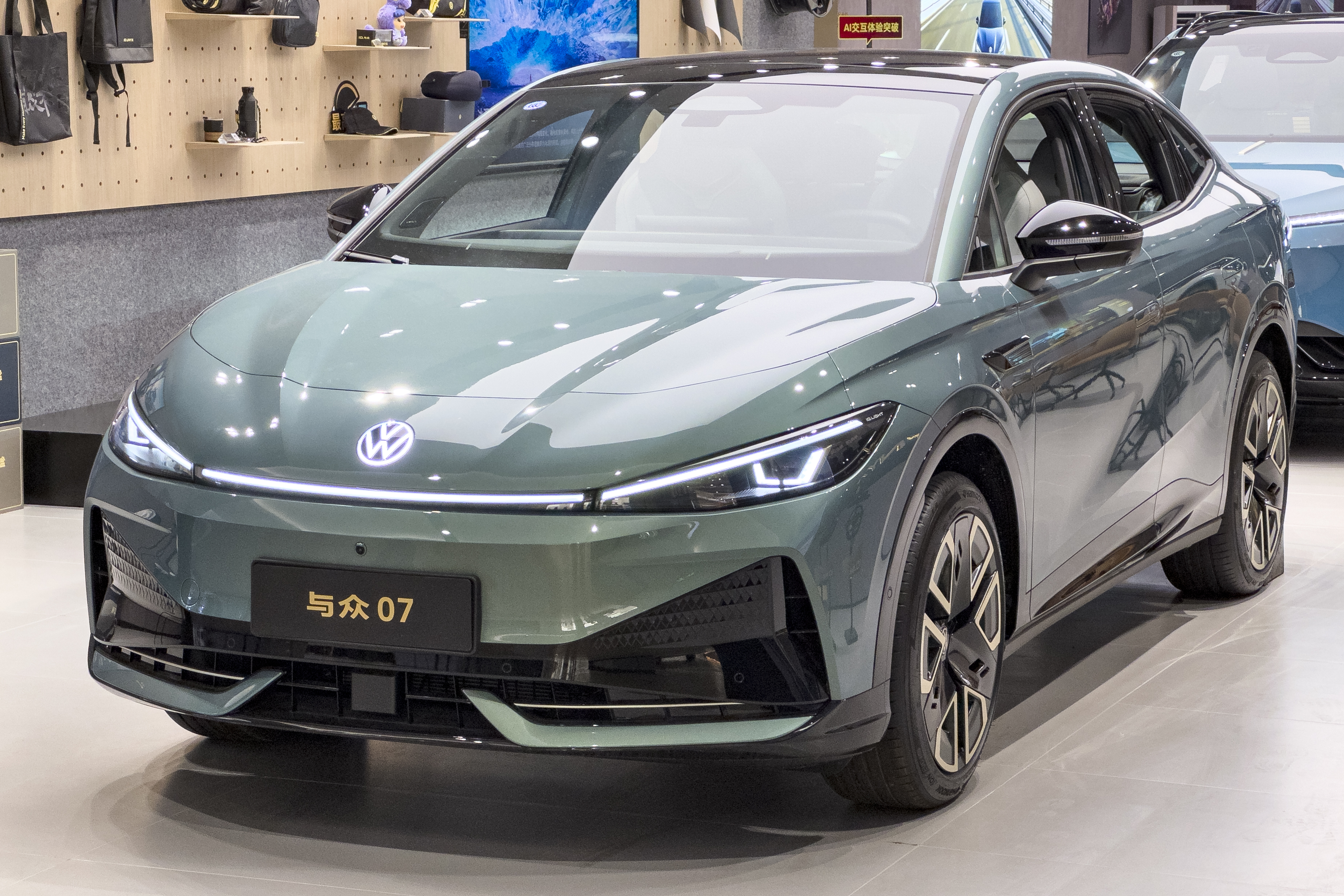

Overview
- Manufacturer: Volkswagen Anhui
- Production: January 2026 – present
- Assembly: China: Hefei (Volkswagen Anhui)

Body and chassis
- Class: Mid-size car (D)
- Body style: 4-door liftback sedan
- Layout: Rear-motor, rear-wheel-drive
- Platform: Volkswagen Group MEB platform combined with China Electrical Architecture (CEA)
- Related: Volkswagen ID.7

Powertrain
- Electric motor: 170 kW EEK PMSM; 170 kW EGP PMSM
- Power output: 228 hp (170 kW; 231 PS)
- Battery: 59.9 kWh LFP Gotion; 77.5 kWh LFP CATL
- Electric range: 538–670 km (334–416 mi) (CLTC)

Dimensions
- Wheelbase: 2,826 mm (111.3 in)
- Length: 4,853 mm (191.1 in)
- Width: 1,852 mm (72.9 in)
- Height: 1,566–1,570 mm (61.7–61.8 in)
- Curb weight: 2,036–2,170 kg (4,489–4,784 lb)

Chronology
- Predecessor: Volkswagen ID.7

The Volkswagen ID. Unyx 07 (Chinese: 大众与众07; pinyin: Dàzhòng Yǔzhòng 07) is a battery electric mid-size sedan produced by Volkswagen under its Volkswagen Anhui joint venture and sold under Volkswagen's ID. Unyx sub-brand.

== Overview ==
The ID. Unyx 07 is the second model in Volkswagen's Unyx sub-brand, after the ID. Unyx 06, which is the Chinese-market version of the Cupra Tavascan. It shares the similar body structure as the Volkswagen ID.7, while the electrical and mechanical systems are entirely replaced using the China Electrical Architecture (CEA), a China-exclusive electronics/electrical platform which was co-developed with XPeng. The platform was first announced in April of 2024 and uses a central computer as well as a zonal structure to control all electronics in the vehicle. It took 18 months for development of the Unyx 07 to go from start to finish.

It uses a MacPherson strut front and five-link independent rear suspension geometry, and is available with optional adaptive dampers. It has a turning radius of 4.7 metres (15.4 ft). Volkswagen says the chassis has a torsional rigidity of 48,700 N•m/°.

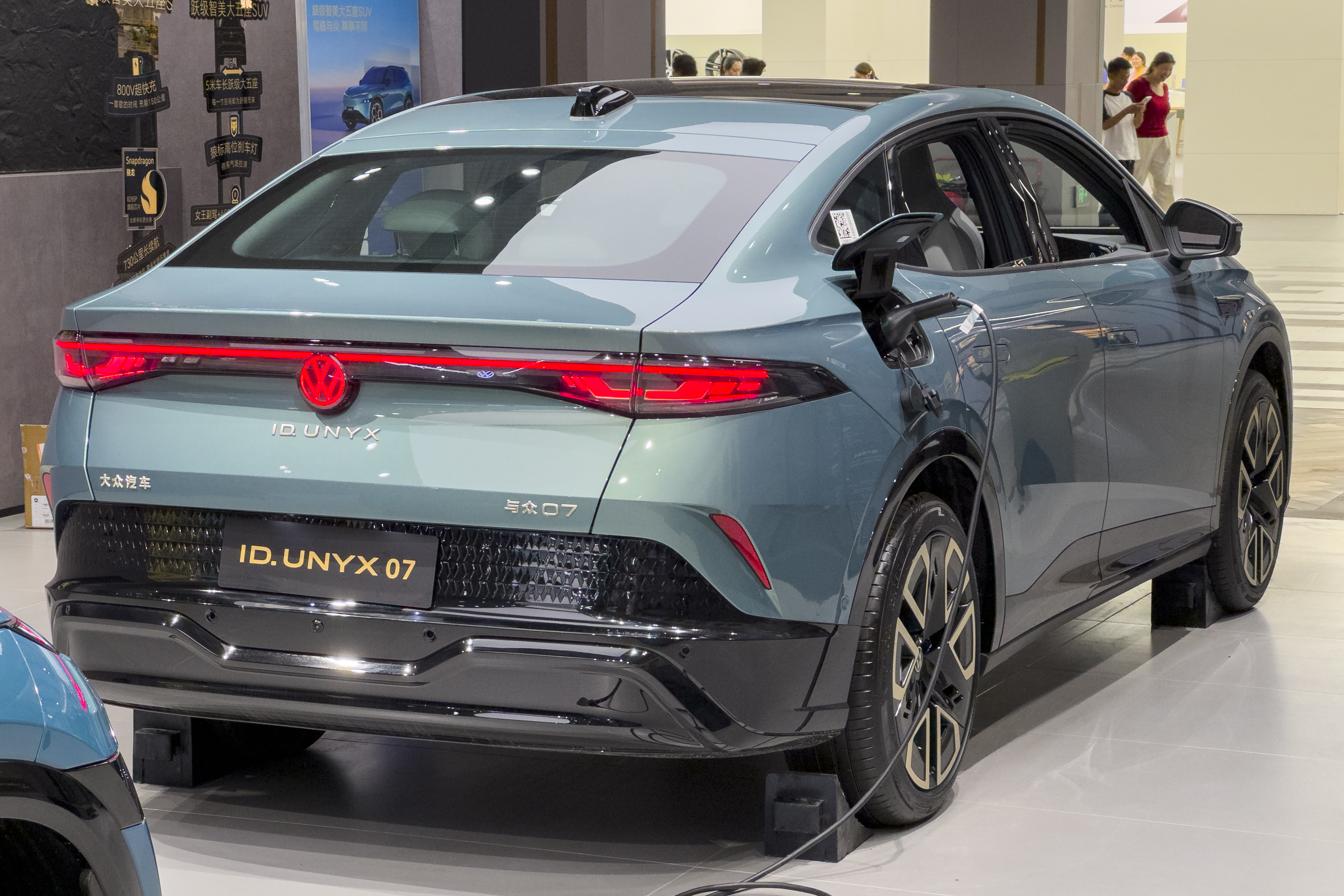
Rear view

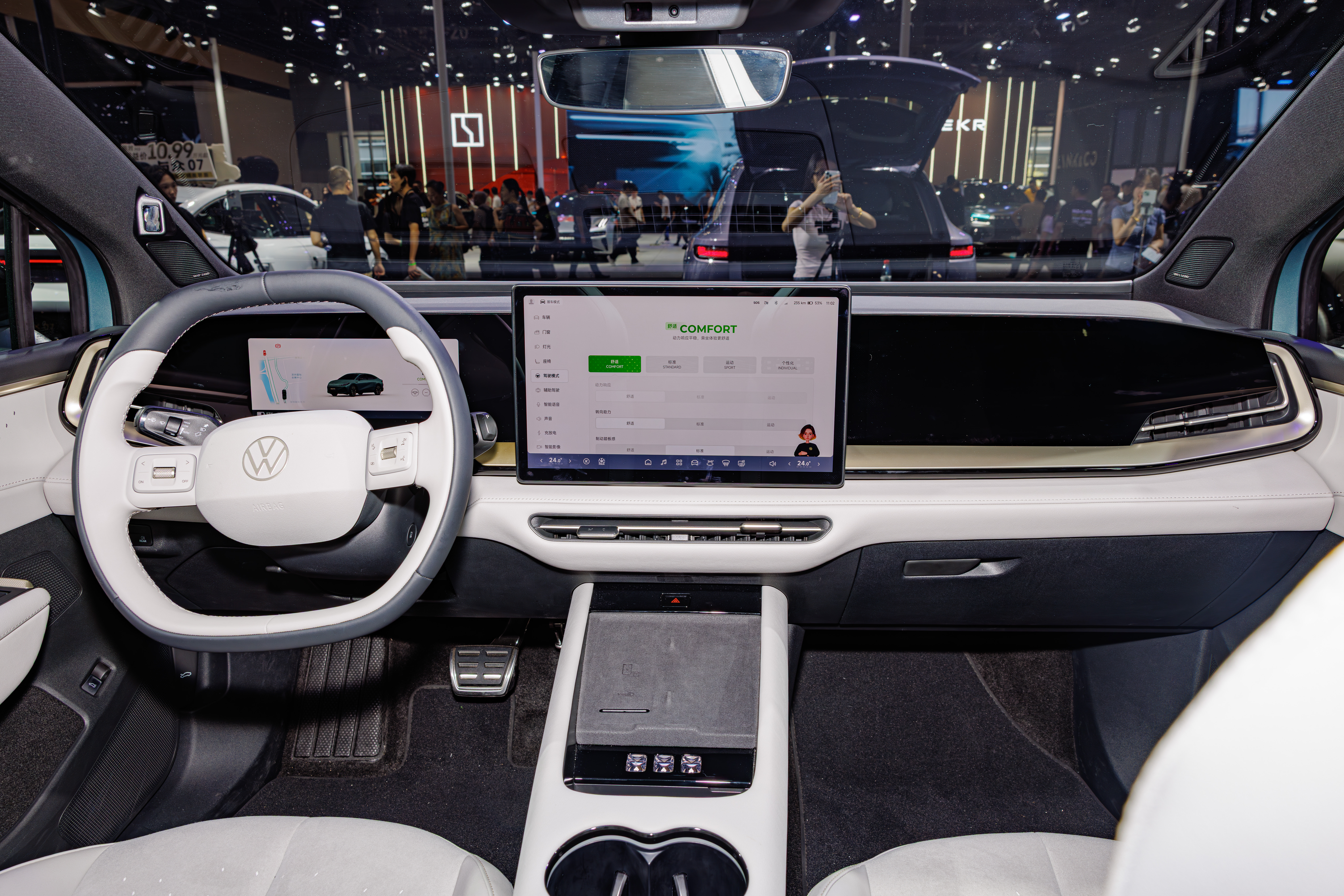
Interior

=== Design and features ===
The ID. Unyx 07 uses the same design language as the ID. Unyx 06, featuring sharp headlights and an exaggerated lower bumper. A flat-top steering wheel is also expected to be utilized, making the interior design different from the ID. Unyx 06. It also uses the gold badges and the full-width light bars of the Unyx 06. A panoramic sunroof is available.

The interior features a 10.25-inch digital instrument cluster supplemented by a 27-inch AR-HUD along with a 15.6-inch 2K-resolution LCD central infotainment touchscreen, and an optional 12-inch 2K-resolution LCD passenger entertainment display, all of which are powered by a Mediatek MT8676 SoC. The seats are equipped with standard microsuede upholstery.

It is equipped with an ADAS system with a sensor suite consisting of one mmWave radar, 6 cameras, and 12 ultrasonic sensors, and is powered by Horizon Robotics J6M chip capable of 128TOPS, and is capable of supervised Level 2 autonomous driving in highway conditions.

=== 2027 update ===
The ID. Unyx 07 was updated on 17 October 2026 for the 2027 model year.

The exterior receives two new paint options, Morning Gold and Venus Green. A new more advanced ADAS system is available, the Hypersense HS8 system developed by the Carizon joint-venture between Volkswagen's Cariad and Horizon Robotics. It has a sensor suite now using one roof-mounted LiDAR sensor, one mmWave radar, and 11 cameras, and is powered by a Horizon Robotics J6H chip capable of 420TOPS. It is capable of supervised Level 2 autonomous driving in highway and urban conditions.

The powertrain has been updated with an updated motor with similar output and a new larger battery option for CLTC range rating of 670 kilometres (416 mi).

== Powertrain ==
The ID. Unyx 07 uses a 228 horsepower electric motor paired with a 59.9 kWh lithium iron phosphate battery made by Gotion that gives it a claimed range of 558 kilometres (347 mi). It is exclusively rear-wheel-drive.

Specifications
Model year	Battery		Motor	Power	Torque	Range	30–80% charge	0–100 km/h (62 mph)	Top speed	Kerb weight
Model year	Type	Weight	Rear	Power	Torque	CLTC	30–80% charge	0–100 km/h (62 mph)	Top speed	Kerb weight
2026	59.9 kWh LFP Gotion	442.7 kg (976 lb)	170 kW EEK PMSM	228 hp (170 kW; 231 PS)	350 N⋅m (258 lb⋅ft)	558 km (347 mi)	25 min	8.1 sec	160 km/h (99 mph)	2,057 kg (4,535 lb)
2027	59.9 kWh LFP Gotion	441.2 kg (973 lb)	170 kW EGP PMSM	228 hp (170 kW; 231 PS)	345 N⋅m (254 lb⋅ft)	538 km (334 mi)	25 min	7.4 sec	160 km/h (99 mph)	2,036 kg (4,489 lb)
2027	77.5 kWh LFP CATL	543 kg (1,197 lb)	170 kW EGP PMSM	228 hp (170 kW; 231 PS)	345 N⋅m (254 lb⋅ft)	670 km (416 mi)	22 min	8.0 sec	160 km/h (99 mph)	2,170 kg (4,784 lb)

== See also ==
- Volkswagen ID. series
- Volkswagen ID. Unyx
