= Volkswagen Anhui =

Joint venture

Volkswagen (Anhui) Automotive Co., Ltd
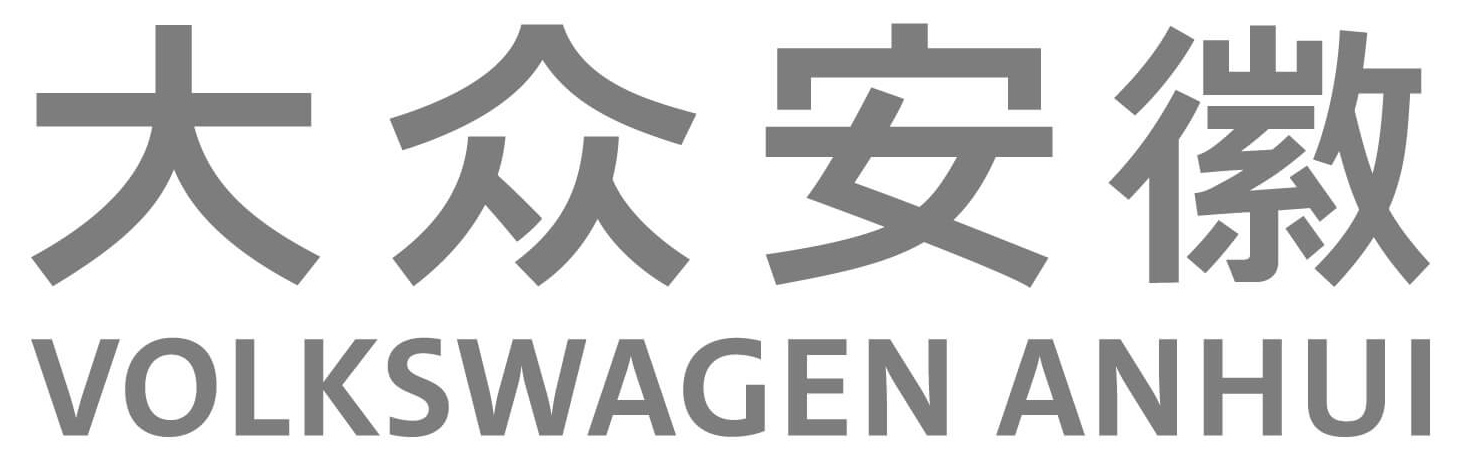
- Native name: 大众汽车（安徽）有限公司
- Type: Limited Liability Company (Foreign Investment, Non-Sole Proprietorship)
- Industry: Automotive
- Founded: December 22, 2017; 9 years ago
- Headquarters: Hefei, Anhui, China
- Key people: Harry Schneider (CPO); Shao Jian (CHRO); Sven-Marc Philipp (CTO)
- Products: Cars
- Parent: Volkswagen (China) Investment Co., Ltd. (75%); Anhui JAC Motors Group Co., Ltd. (25%)
- Website: www.volkswagen-anhui.com

Volkswagen Anhui (VWA) is a joint venture formed in 2017 between JAC Group and Volkswagen headquartered in Hefei, Anhui, initially to produce electric vehicles under the SEAT brand, and later the Sehol and Cupra brands.

== History ==
The company was originally named JAC Volkswagen Co., Ltd.. In 2020, Volkswagen increased its stake in JAC Volkswagen to 75% and acquired management rights in the company, becoming Volkswagen's first subsidiary with full control in mainland China. The company was subsequently renamed Volkswagen (Anhui) Co., Ltd.

In May 2023, Volkswagen announced an additional investment of RMB 23.1 billion (US$3.3 billion) in Volkswagen Anhui, of which RMB 14.1 billion was invested in the construction of a research and development center and nearly RMB 9.1 billion was invested in the construction of the first phase of the Hefei production base.

== Products ==
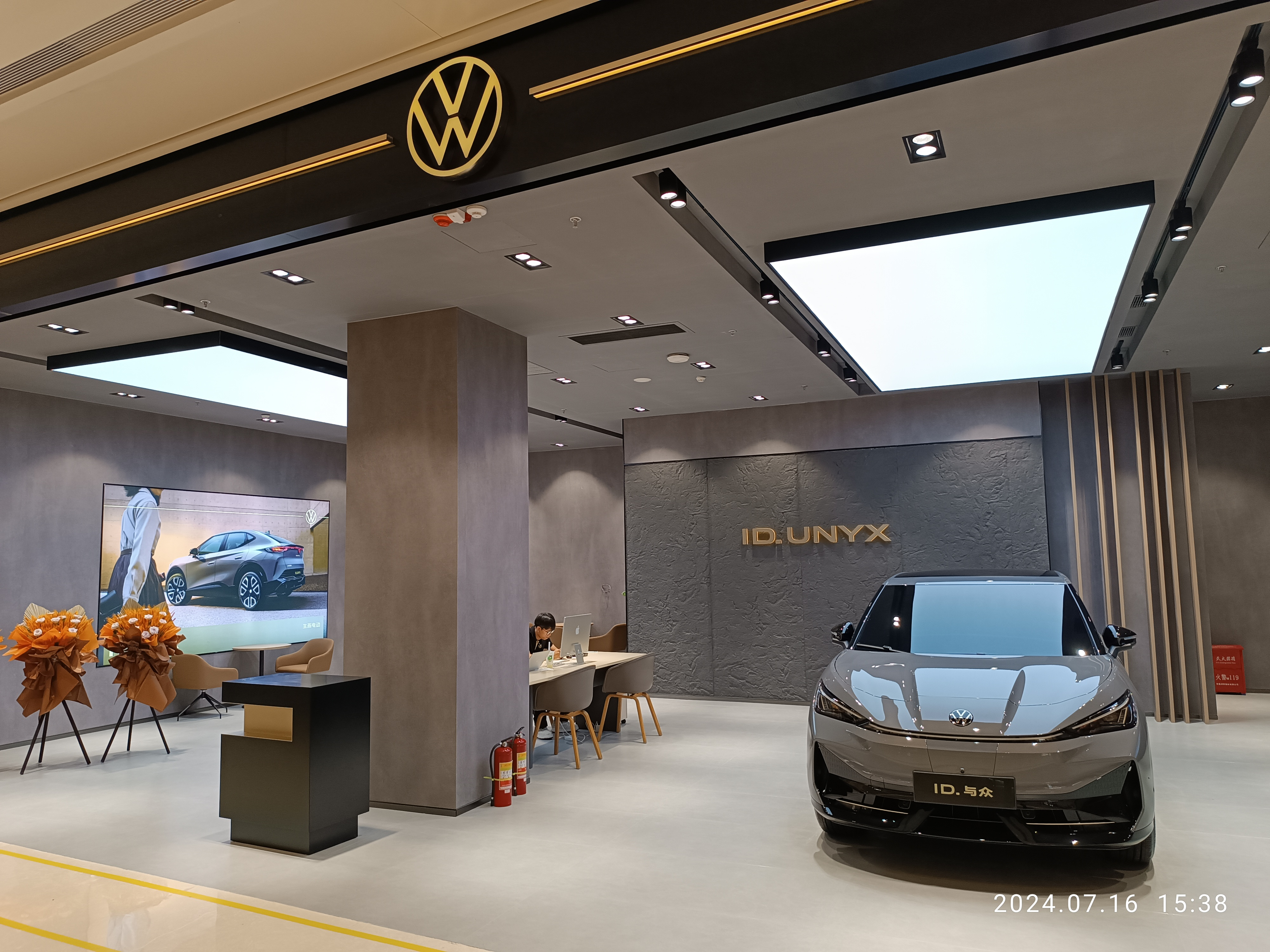
An ID. UNYX store in Shenzhen

The Volkswagen Anhui MEB plant started construction in 2021. It is based on the expansion of the original JAC Motors plant and is the third Volkswagen Group plant in China. Its first mass-produced model will be the Cupra Tavascan, with production beginning in 2023, though the model will be export only.

In 2024, ID.UNYX (Chinese: ID.与众), developed based on Cupra Tavascan, was launched in mainland China. ID. and subsequent new models for the mainland China market will use the gold VW logo to distinguish them from the products of the other two Volkswagen joint ventures. Volkswagen Anhui plans to launch more models based on the MEB platform and the CMP platform developed for entry-level electric vehicles in China.

Volkswagen Anhui produced its 100,000th vehicle on 18 August 2026, which was an ID. Unyx 08.

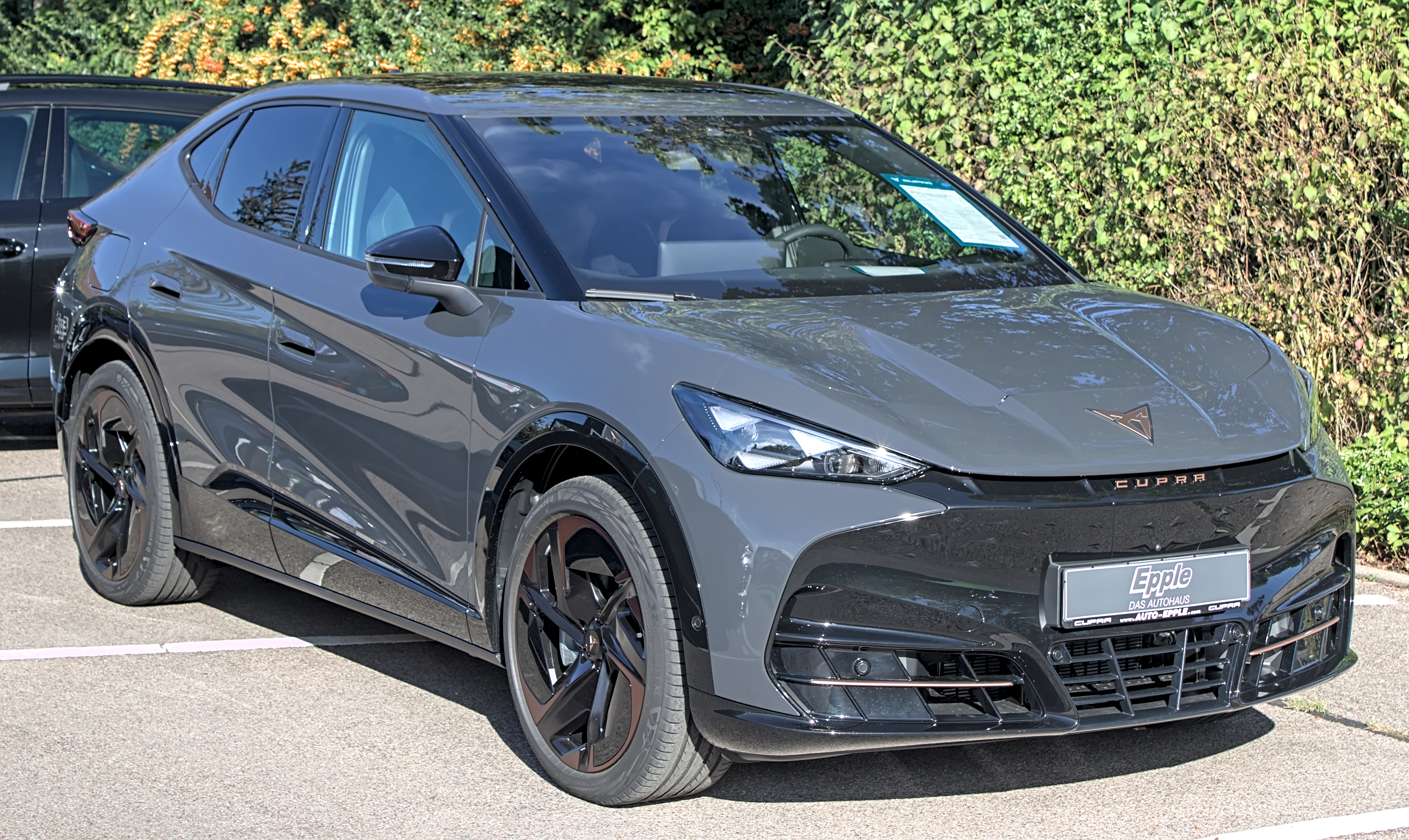
Cupra Tavascan

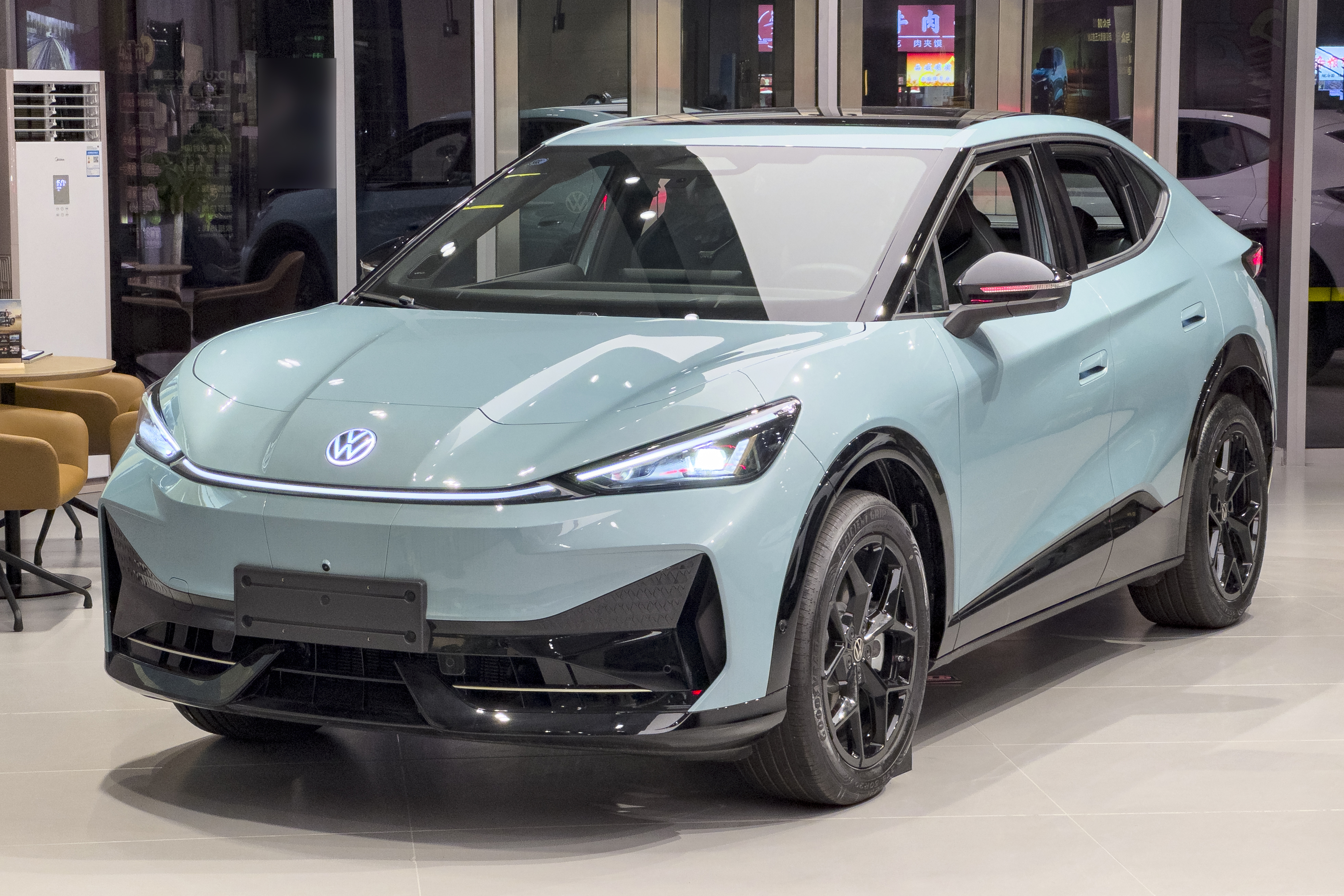
Volkswagen ID. Unyx 06

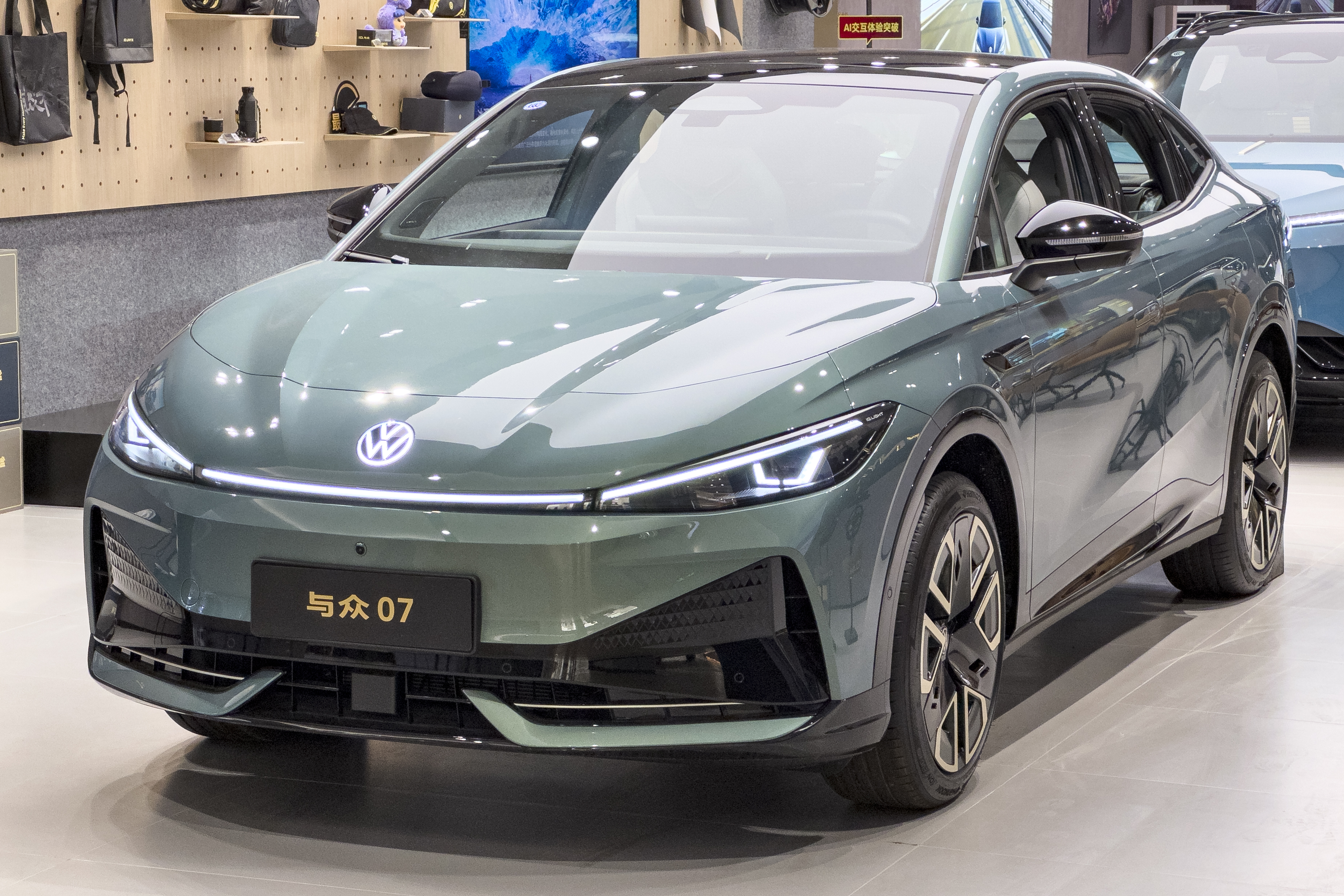
Volkswagen ID. Unyx 07

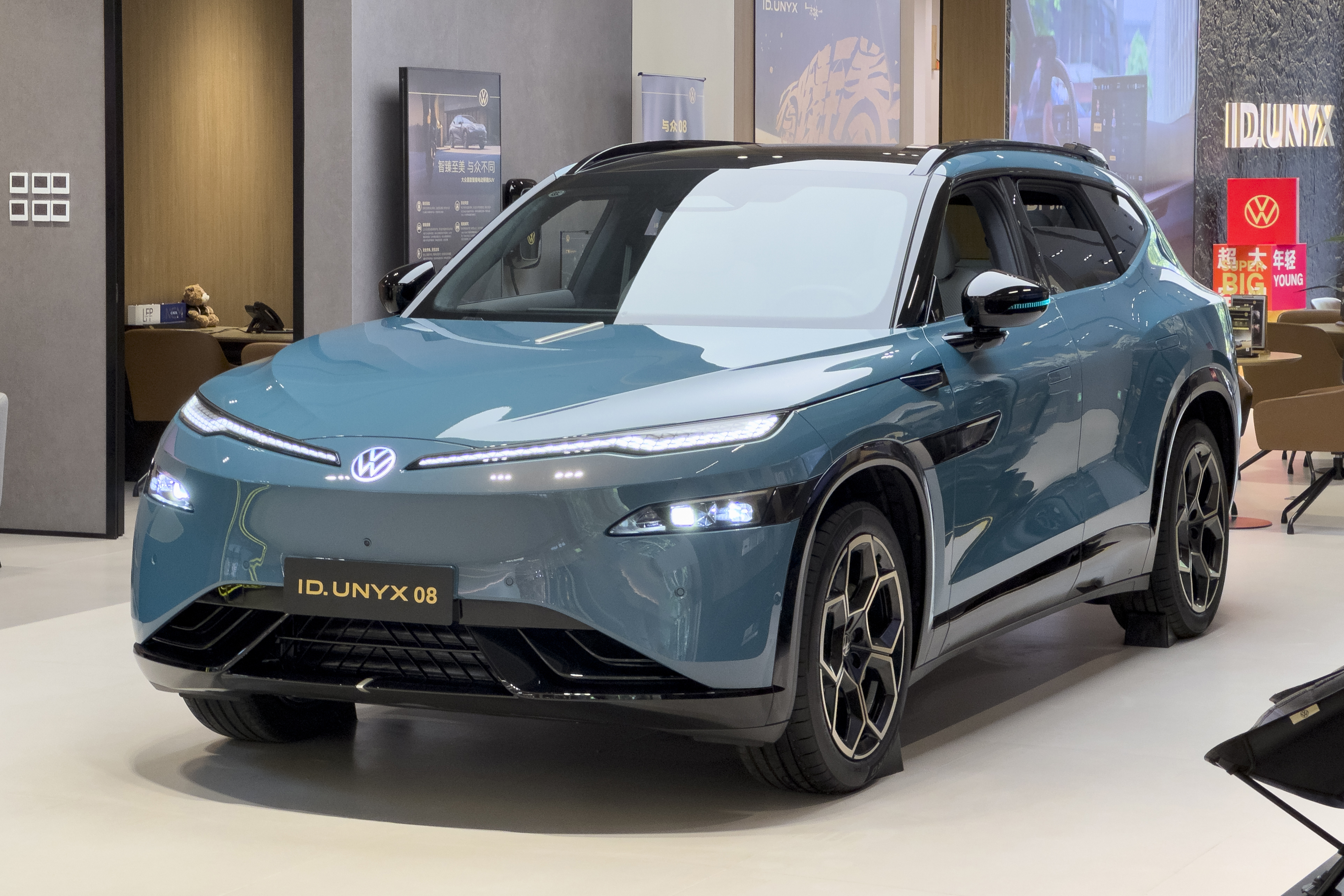
Volkswagen ID. Unyx 08

Volkswagen ID. Unyx 09

== See also ==
- Volkswagen ID. Unyx
- Volkswagen Group China
- SAIC Volkswagen
- FAW-Volkswagen
