= Volkswagen ID. Unyx 08 =

Battery electric full-size crossover SUV

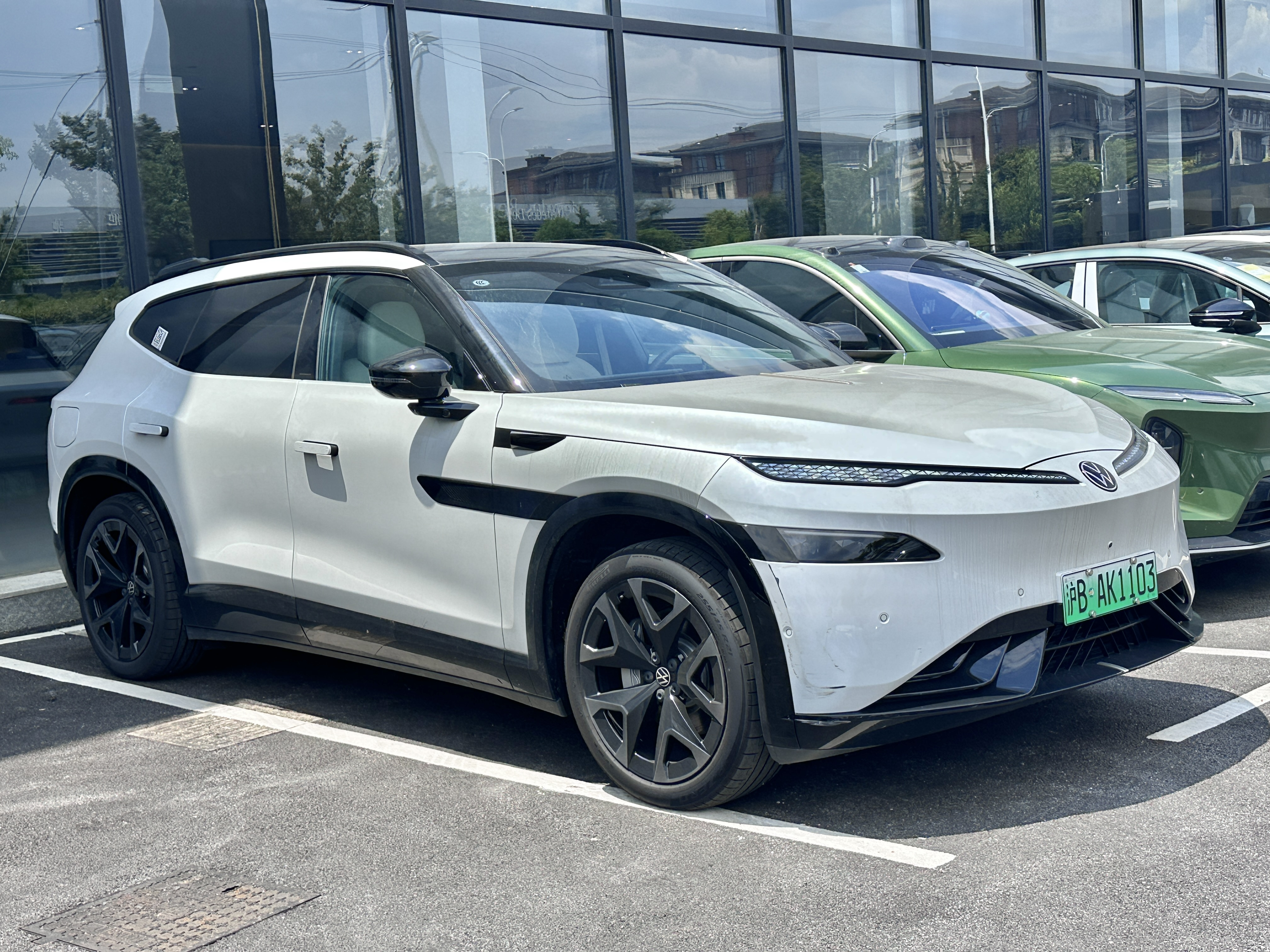

Overview
- Manufacturer: Volkswagen Anhui
- Model code: MM01 (Volkswagen); V01 (XPeng)
- Production: March 2026 – present
- Assembly: China: Hefei, Anhui

Body and chassis
- Class: Full-size SUV (E-segment)
- Body style: 5-door crossover SUV
- Layout: Rear-motor, rear-wheel-drive; Dual-motor, all-wheel-drive
- Platform: XPeng Edward Platform
- Related: XPeng G9

Powertrain
- Electric motor: 140 kW EFM induction (front); 230 kW EDF PMSM (rear)
- Power output: 310–497 hp (231–371 kW; 314–504 PS)
- Battery: 82.4 kWh LFP CATL; 95.0 kWh LFP CATL
- Electric range: 630–730 km (391–454 mi) (CLTC)
- Plug-in charging: DC: 270–315 kW

Dimensions
- Wheelbase: 3,030 mm (119.3 in)
- Length: 5,000 mm (196.9 in)
- Width: 1,954 mm (76.9 in)
- Height: 1,672–1,688 mm (65.8–66.5 in)
- Curb weight: 2,191–2,360 kg (4,830–5,203 lb)

The Volkswagen ID. Unyx 08 (Chinese: 大众与众08; pinyin: Dàzhòng Yǔzhòng 08) is a battery electric full-size SUV produced by Volkswagen under its Volkswagen Anhui joint venture and sold under Volkswagen's ID. Unyx sub-brand. It is the first Volkswagen model co-developed with XPeng.

== Overview ==
The ID. Unyx 08 was first previewed by the ID. Evo concept showed at the 2025 Shanghai Auto Show. It uses a 5-seater layout. Exterior images were released by the MIIT on 10 November 2025. In addition to the exterior images being released by the MIIT, images of the exterior were also posted on the ID. Unyx brand's official WeChat account.

A pre-production version, using the ID. Evo name, was unveiled on 26 May 2025.

Production of the ID. Unyx 08 was commenced on 13 March 2026. Display vehicles also began appearing in dealers at the same time. Sales of the ID. Unyx 08 began on 16 April 2026.

After poor monthly sales figures after launch, the ID. Unyx 08 was refreshed in China after only 5 months with more standard features and a significant price reduction on 12 September 2026. Additionally, a Shadow Hunter version was launched with a black and orange accent color scheme on the exterior and interior.

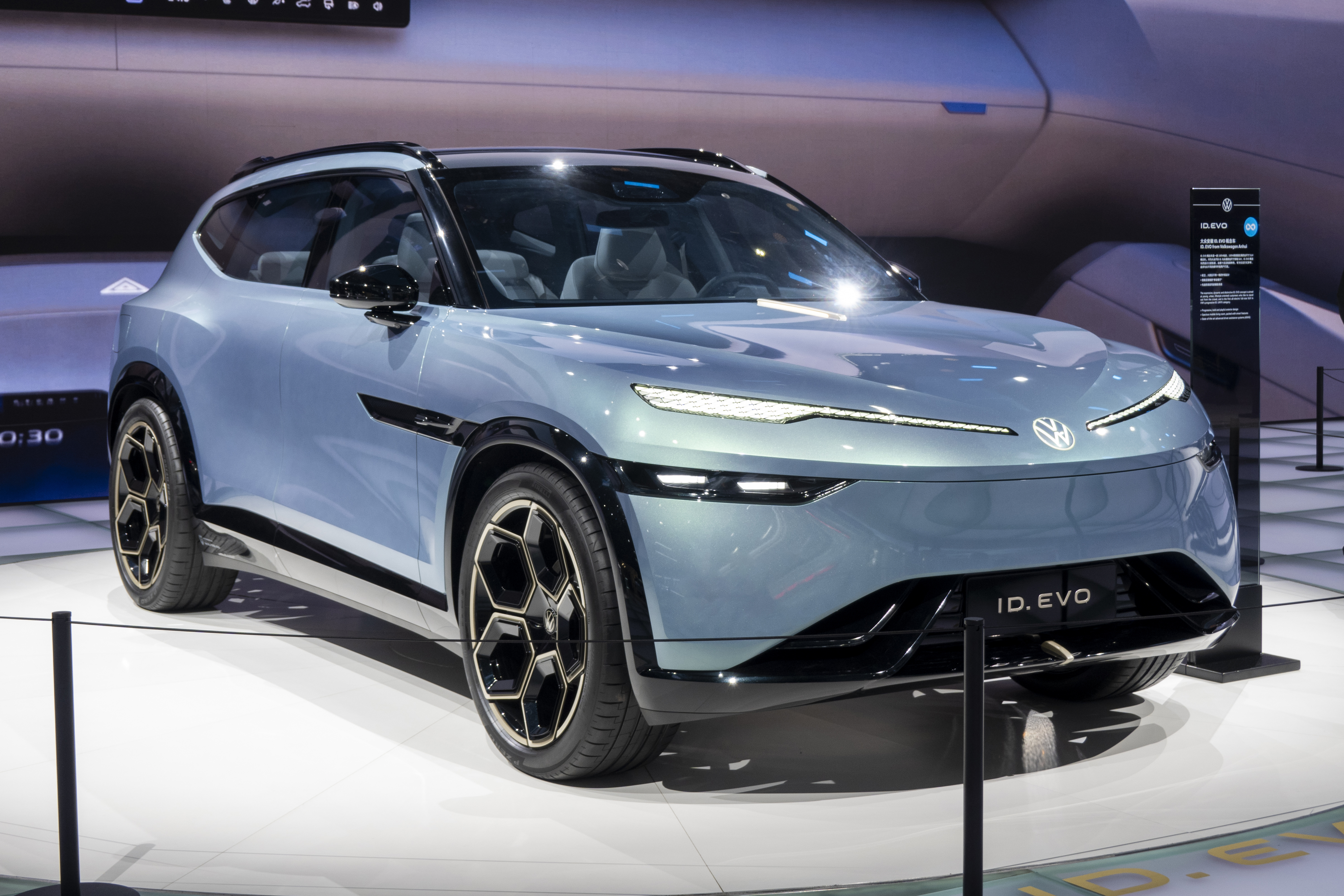
The Volkswagen ID. Evo concept introduced at Auto Shanghai 2025 directly previewed the Unyx 08.

Rear view of ID. Evo concept

=== Design ===
The design of the ID. Unyx 08 was influenced by the ID. Code design study. It is slightly larger than the XPeng G9. It is also the 3rd model of the ID. Unyx sub-brand. The ID. Unyx 08's Connectivity and ADAS system is also developed by XPeng, as is the Edward Platform it is based on.

The ID. Unyx 08's front fascia features slim, upward-sweeping headlights and a centrally-positioned Volkswagen logo. The blackened A-pillars create a floating roof effect. The rear uses slender taillights and a red Volkswagen logo is also present. Gold ID. Unyx and "与众08" badges are present. A panoramic sunroof is optional.

Volkswagen ID. Unyx 08 Shadow Hunter Edition

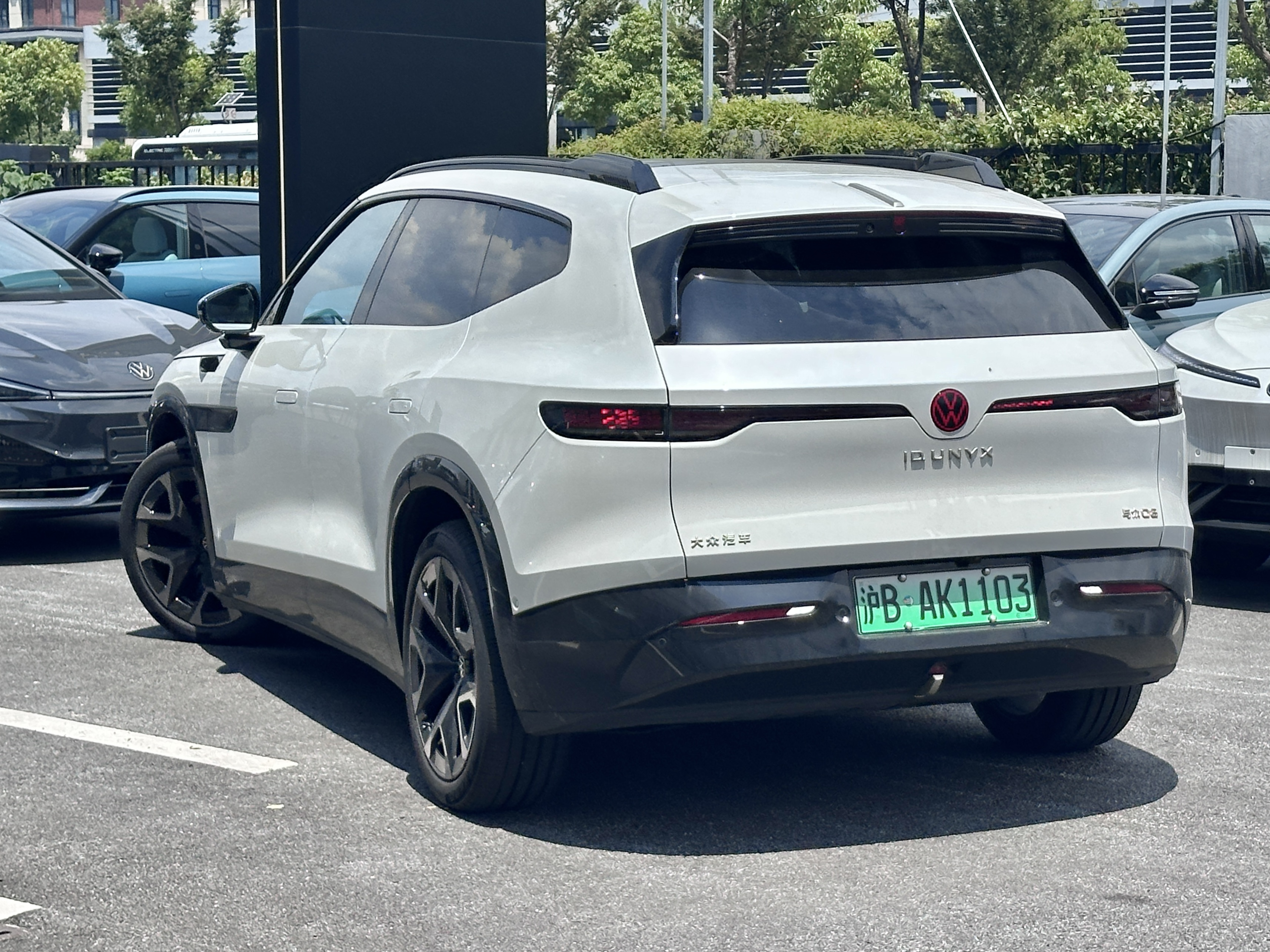
Rear view

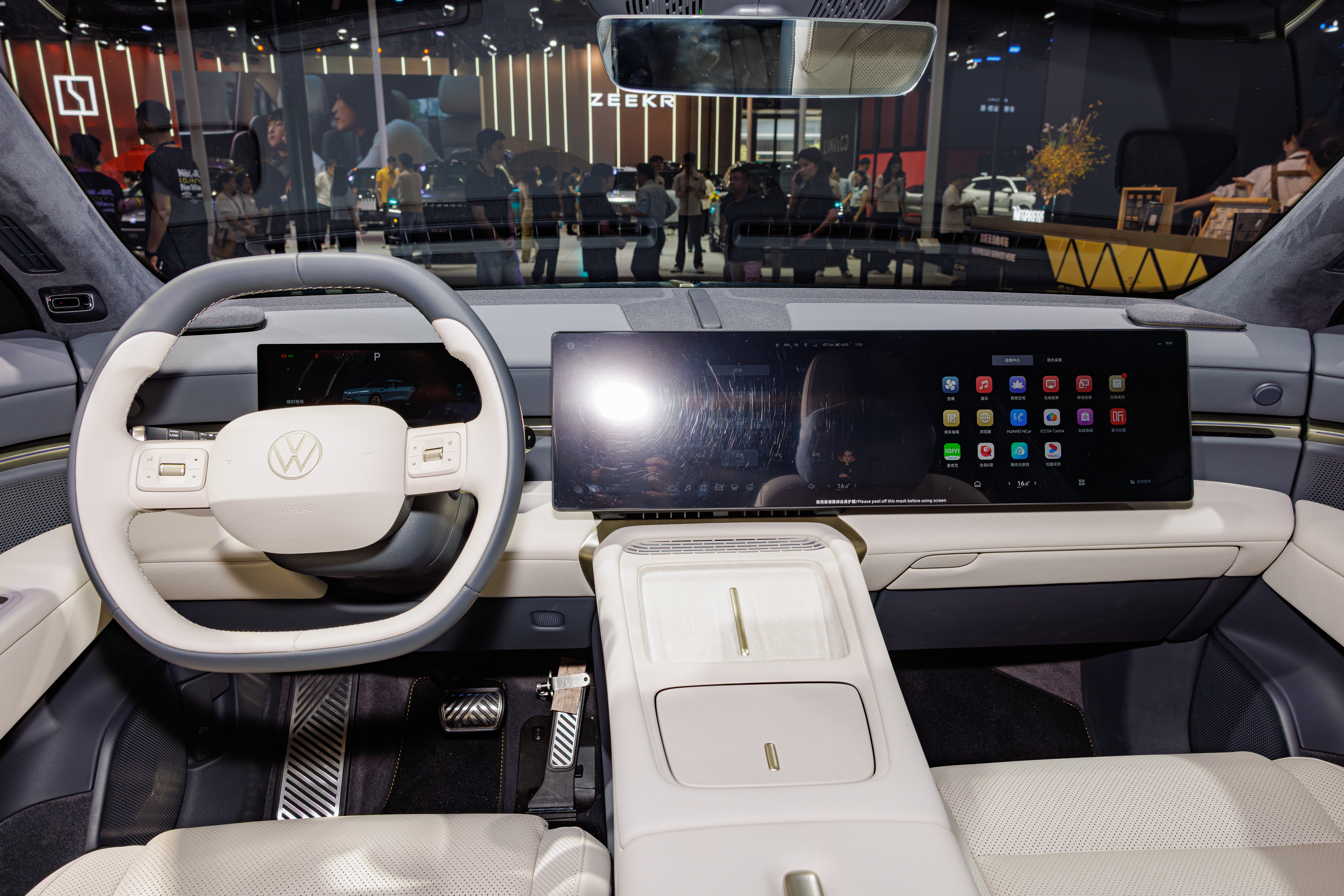
Interior

=== Equipment ===
The interior of the ID. Unyx 08 integrates a wraparound cockpit design with eco-friendly and skin-friendly materials. The ID. Unyx 08 uses a Level 2 ADAS system with support for over-the-air updates and large language model-powered AI assistant. The ADAS system uses a sensor suite consisting of 3 mmWave radars, 11 cameras, and 12 ultrasonic sensors, and is powered by two of XPeng's Turing chips for a total of 1500 TOPS. An illuminated wolf badge is also present on the third brake light below the spoiler.

Two 15-inch 2.5K touchscreens are utilized, similar to that of the ID. Era 9X, along with a 10.25-inch instrument cluster, all powered by a Qualcomm Snapdragon 8295P SoC. Volkswagen chose to use physical controls on the steering wheel and doors. Dual wireless phone chargers are on top of the lower storage area, rear occupants get folding tray tables that fold down from the front seats, a 20-speaker system comes standard, and the seats are exclusively available with leather upholstery; the front seats get 10-way power adjustment. A 1.74 m^{2} (18.7 ft^{2}) power-dimming panoramic sunroof is also present and has 10 levels of opacity that can be changed by voice control or through the touchscreen.

== Powertrain ==
The ID. Unyx 08 is offered in both rear-wheel-drive and all-wheel-drive versions. Rear-wheel-drive models use a 308 horsepower (230 kW; 312 PS) rear permanent magnet synchronous motor. All-wheel-drive versions use the same rear motor and add a 188 horsepower (140 kW; 191 PS) AC induction motor at the front axle, for a total of 496 horsepower (370 kW; 503 PS). Both versions use lithium iron phosphate batteries supplied by CATL, and comes with 82.4 or 95 kWh battery capacities. The ID. Unyx 08 has a range of up to 730 kilometres (450 mi) on the CLTC cycle. It is built on an 800-volt architecture, allowing for a 10–80% charging time of 20 minutes for both packs.

Specifications
Battery		Motor		Power	Torque	Range	DC fast charging		0–100 km/h (62 mph)	Top speed	Kerb weight
Type	Weight	Front	Rear	Power	Torque	CLTC	Peak kW	10–80%	0–100 km/h (62 mph)	Top speed	Kerb weight
82.368 kWh LFP CATL	604.5 kg (1,333 lb)	—	230 kW EDF PMSM	309 hp (230 kW; 313 PS)	465 N⋅m (343 lb⋅ft)	630 km (391 mi)	270 kW	20 min	7.4 sec	200 km/h (124 mph)	2,191 kg (4,830 lb)
95.04 kWh LFP CATL	670.5 kg (1,478 lb)	—	230 kW EDF PMSM	309 hp (230 kW; 313 PS)	465 N⋅m (343 lb⋅ft)	730 km (454 mi)	315 kW	20 min	7.3 sec	200 km/h (124 mph)	2,257 kg (4,976 lb)
95.04 kWh LFP CATL	670.5 kg (1,478 lb)	140 kW EFM induction	230 kW EDF PMSM	496 hp (370 kW; 503 PS)	695 N⋅m (513 lb⋅ft)	700 km (435 mi)	315 kW	20 min	4.9 sec	200 km/h (124 mph)	2,360 kg (5,203 lb)

== See also ==
- Volkswagen ID. series
- Volkswagen ID. Unyx
