= Cupra Tavascan =

Battery electric compact crossover SUV

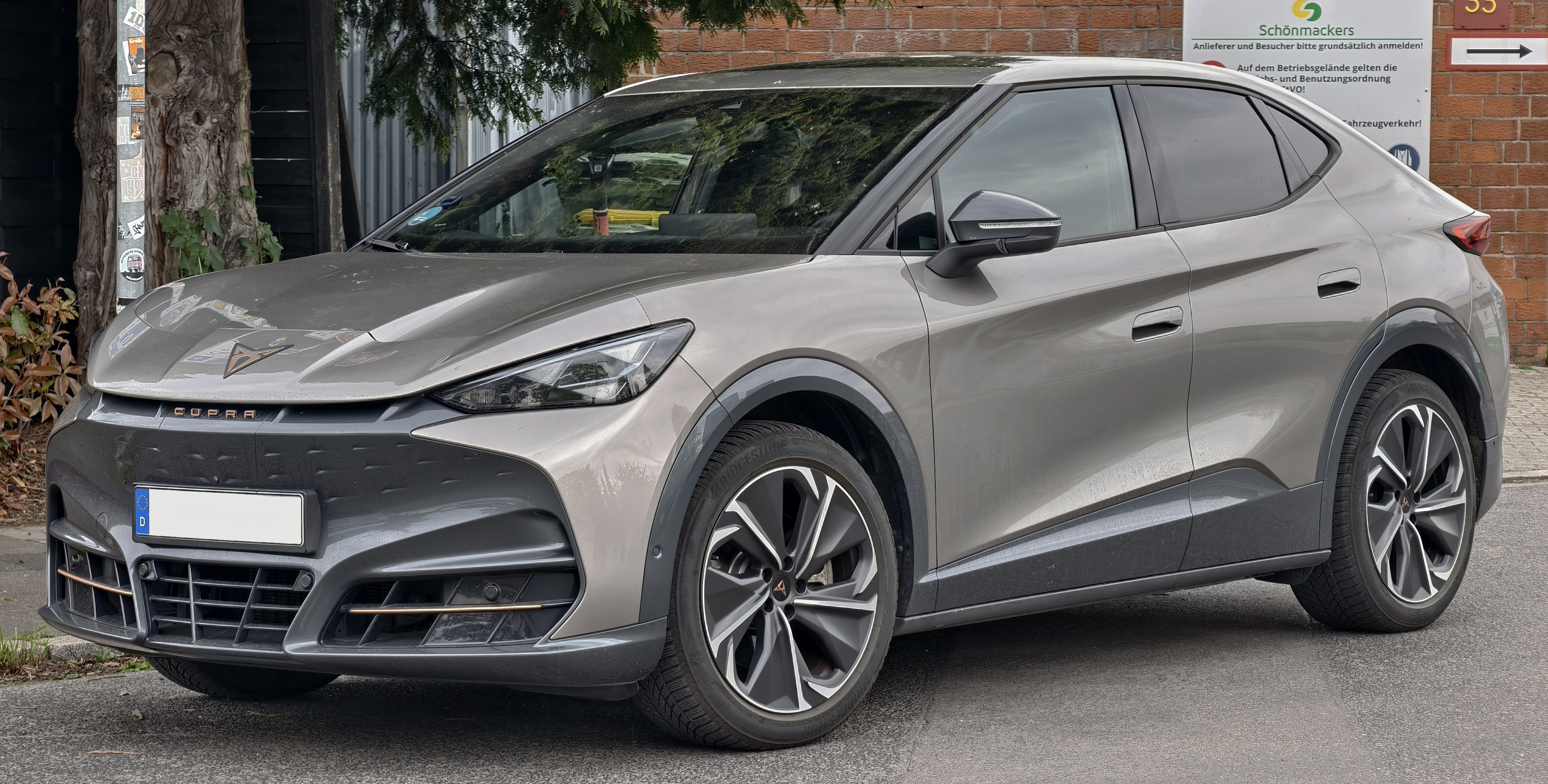

Overview
- Manufacturer: Cupra (SEAT)
- Also called: Volkswagen ID. Unyx (China, 2024–2025); Volkswagen ID. Unyx 06 (China, 2025–present)
- Production: December 2023 – present
- Assembly: China: Hefei, Anhui (Volkswagen Anhui)
- Designer: Alberto Torrecillas

Body and chassis
- Class: Compact crossover SUV (C)
- Body style: 5-door coupe SUV
- Layout: Rear-motor, rear-wheel drive Dual-motor, all-wheel-drive
- Platform: Volkswagen Group MEB
- Related: Volkswagen ID.4/ID.5; Ford Capri EV

Powertrain
- Electric motor: APP 550 permanent magnet brushless motor
- Transmission: Single-speed
- Battery: 82 kWh lithium-ion
- Range: 520 km (320 mi) (Tavascan VZ); 550 km (340 mi) (Tavascan Endurance)

Dimensions
- Wheelbase: 2,766 mm (108.9 in)
- Length: 4,644 mm (182.8 in); 4,663 mm (183.6 in) (Volkswagen ID. UNYX 06)
- Width: 1,861 mm (73.3 in); 1,860 mm (73.2 in) (Volkswagen ID. Unyx 06)
- Height: 1,597 mm (62.9 in); 1,610 mm (63.4 in) (Volkswagen ID. Unyx 06)

The Cupra Tavascan is a battery electric compact crossover SUV (C-segment) produced by Volkswagen Anhui, a joint venture between Volkswagen (75%) and Chinese company JAC Group (25%), and sold by Cupra, a subsidiary of SEAT.

The concept version was first shown at the 2019 Frankfurt Motor Show. In March 2021, it was confirmed that the vehicle would begin production, with the official launch taking place in April 2023.

== Overview ==
=== Concept car ===
The Tavascan is based on the MEB platform designed for electric vehicles of the Volkswagen Group, first used in a production car by the Volkswagen ID.3. The SUV has one electric motor on each axle, providing all-wheel drive and a cumulative power of 225 kW (302 hp).

The Tavascan's battery has a capacity of 77 kWh (280 MJ), providing a range of 450 km (280 mi).

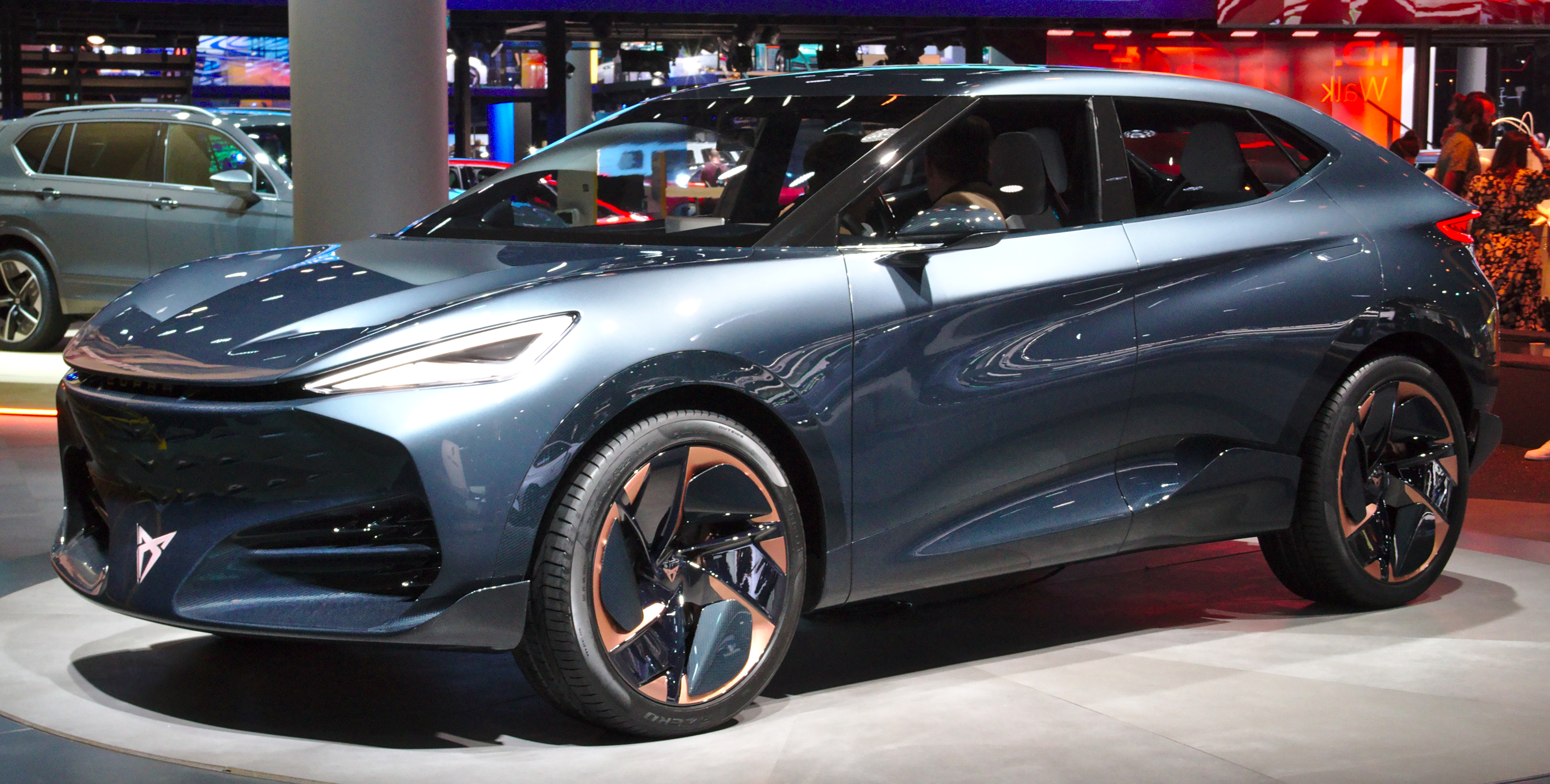
Tavascan concept

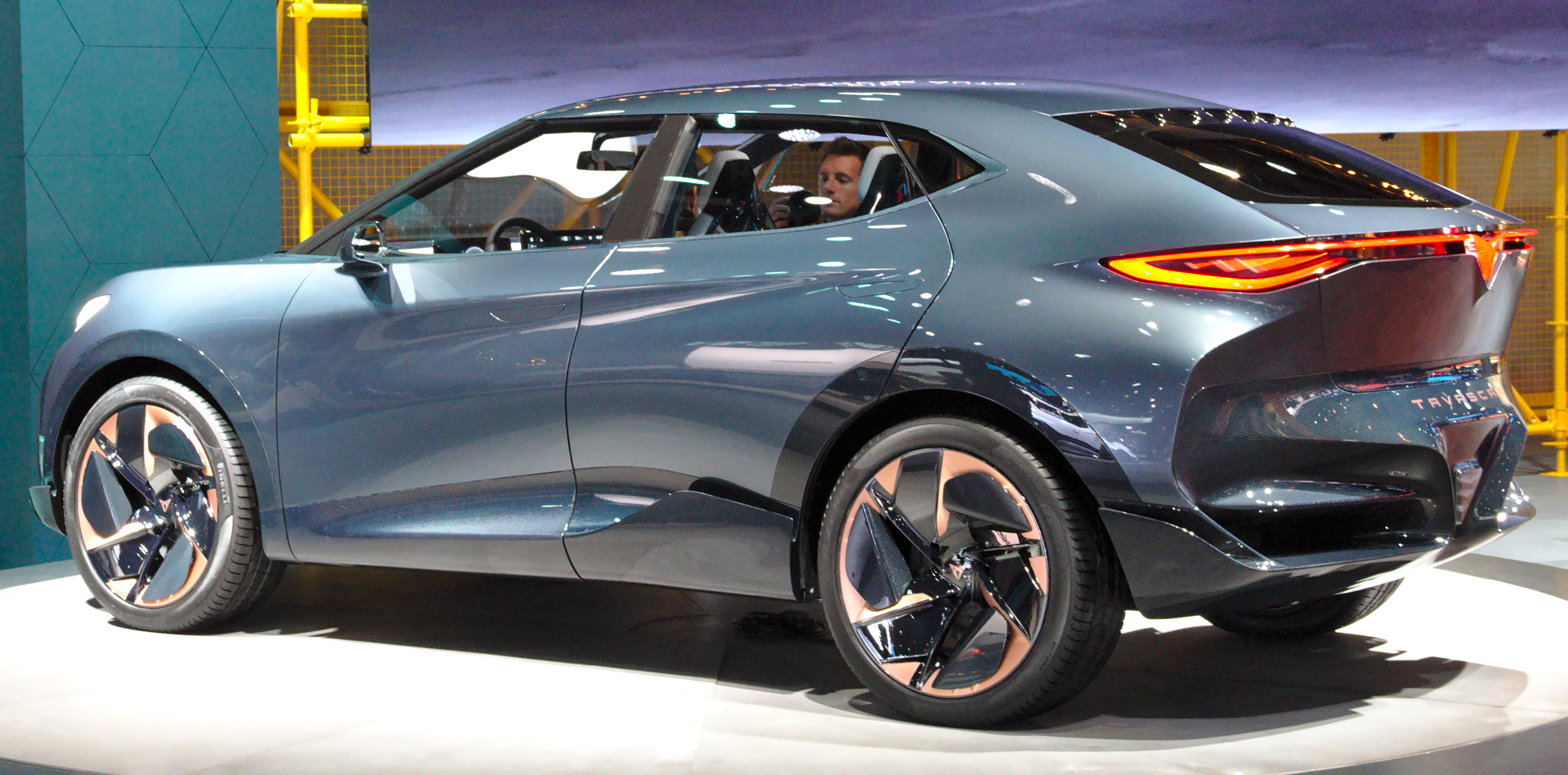
Rear view

=== Tavascan Extreme E ===
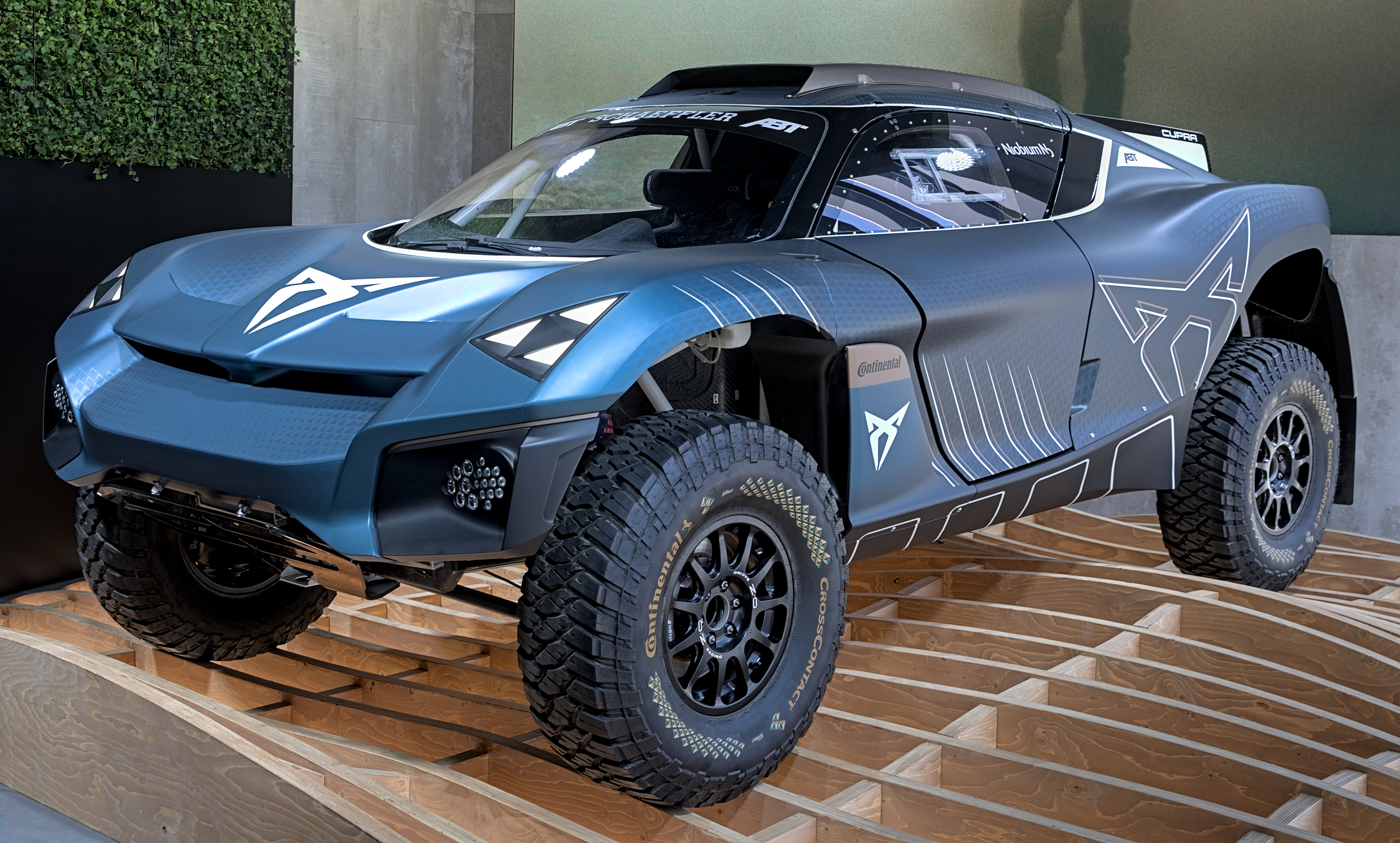
Tavascan Extreme E (IAA 2021)

The Cupra Tavascan Extreme E was unveiled at the IAA Mobility Motor Show in Munich in September 2021. It was developed in collaboration with Abt Sportsline and will debut in the experimental Extreme E off-road racing series.

=== Production version ===
Teaser images of the Tavascan were shown in March 2023 in a video made in collaboration with Spanish singer-songwriter Rosalía. The production version was officially unveiled on 21 April 2023. It uses the same 82 kWh battery as the Volkswagen ID.5, with the top spec having 335 hp (250 kW) and a range of 550 km (342 mi).

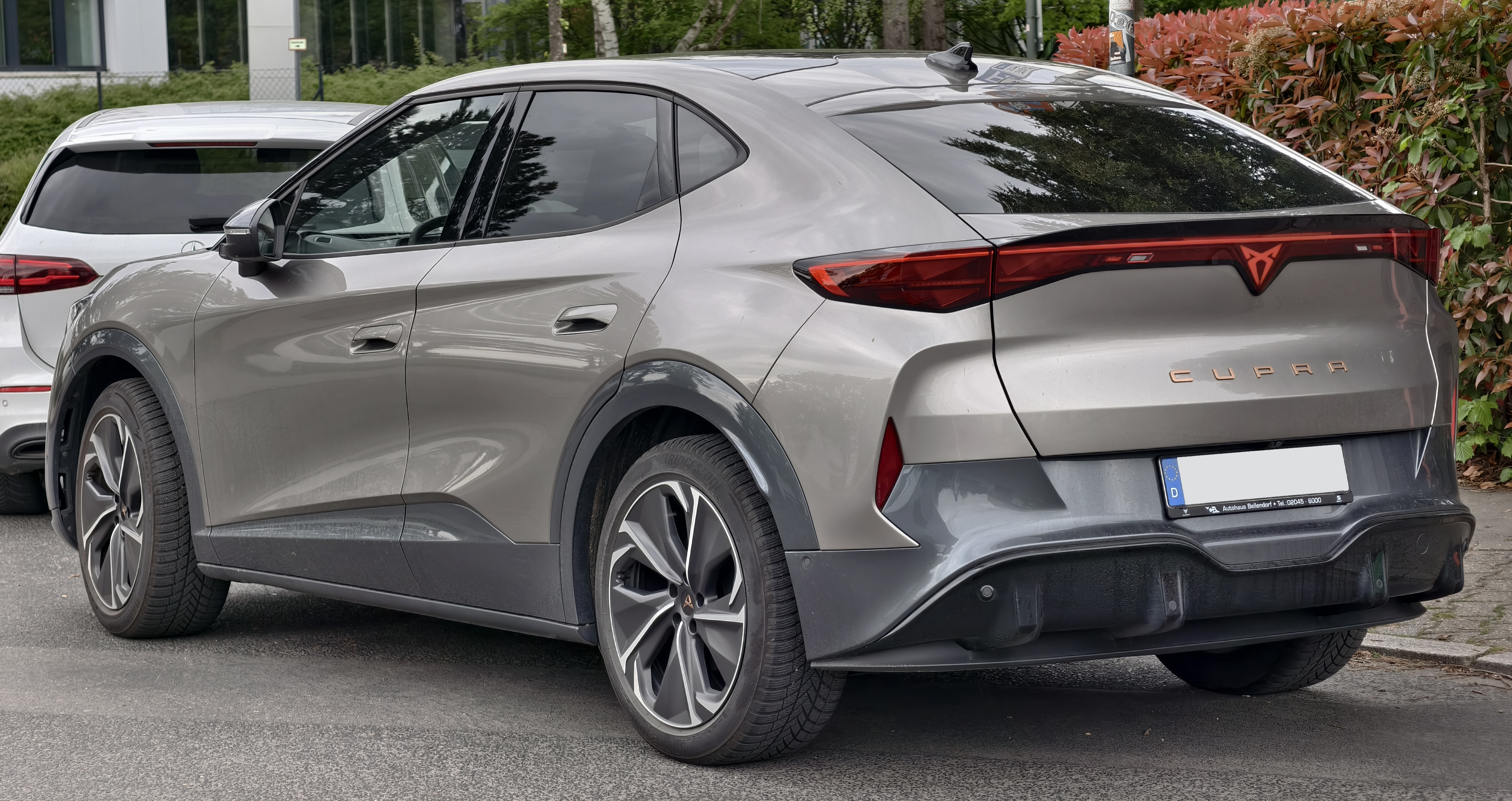
Rear view

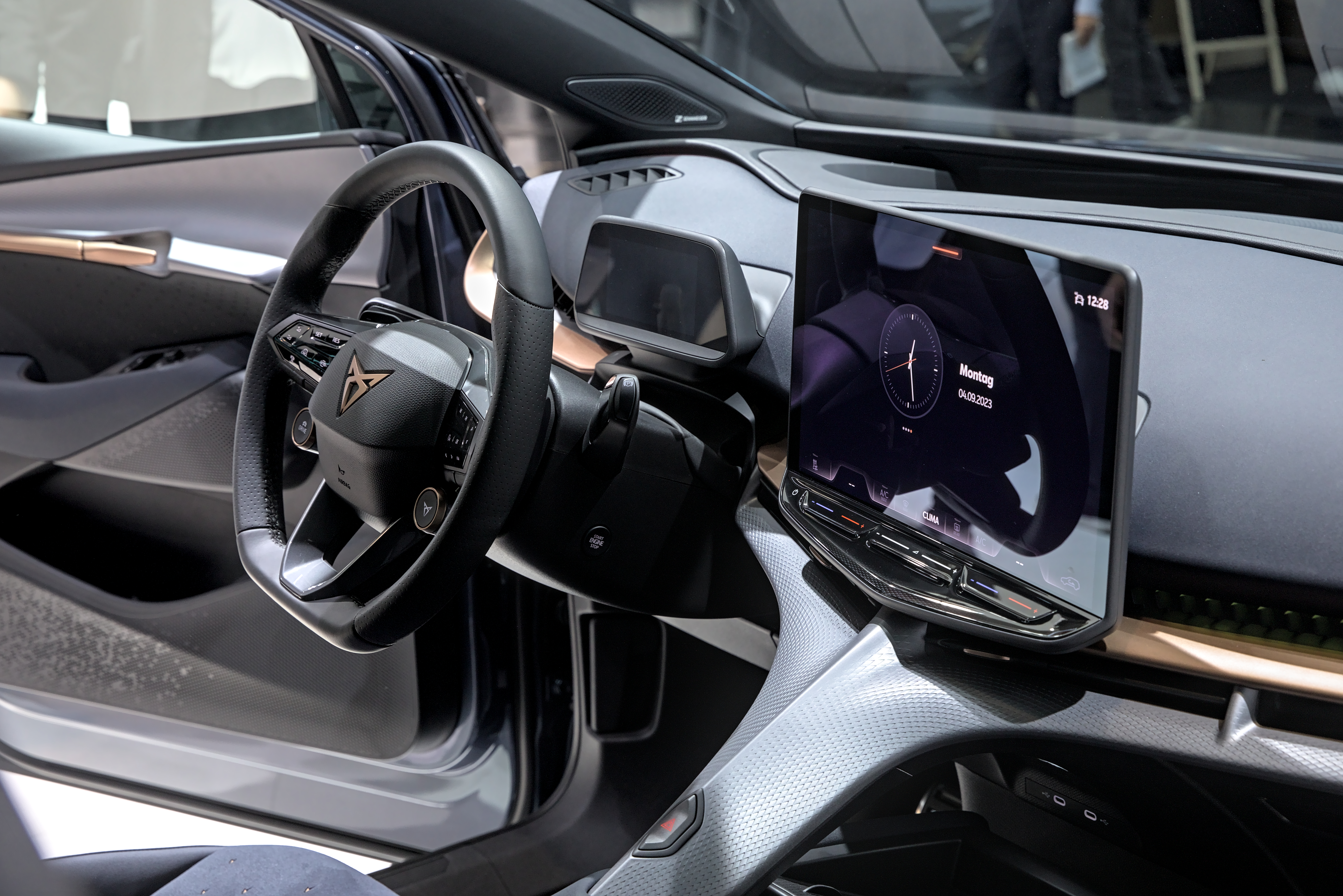
Interior

==== Volkswagen ID. Unyx 06 (China) ====
A modified version of the Tavascan is marketed as the Volkswagen ID. Unyx (Chinese: 大众与众; pinyin: Dàzhòng Yǔzhòng) in China. In April 2025, the Volkswagen ID. Unyx was renamed to Volkswagen ID. Unyx 06 (Chinese: 大众与众06; pinyin: Dàzhòng Yǔzhòng 06).

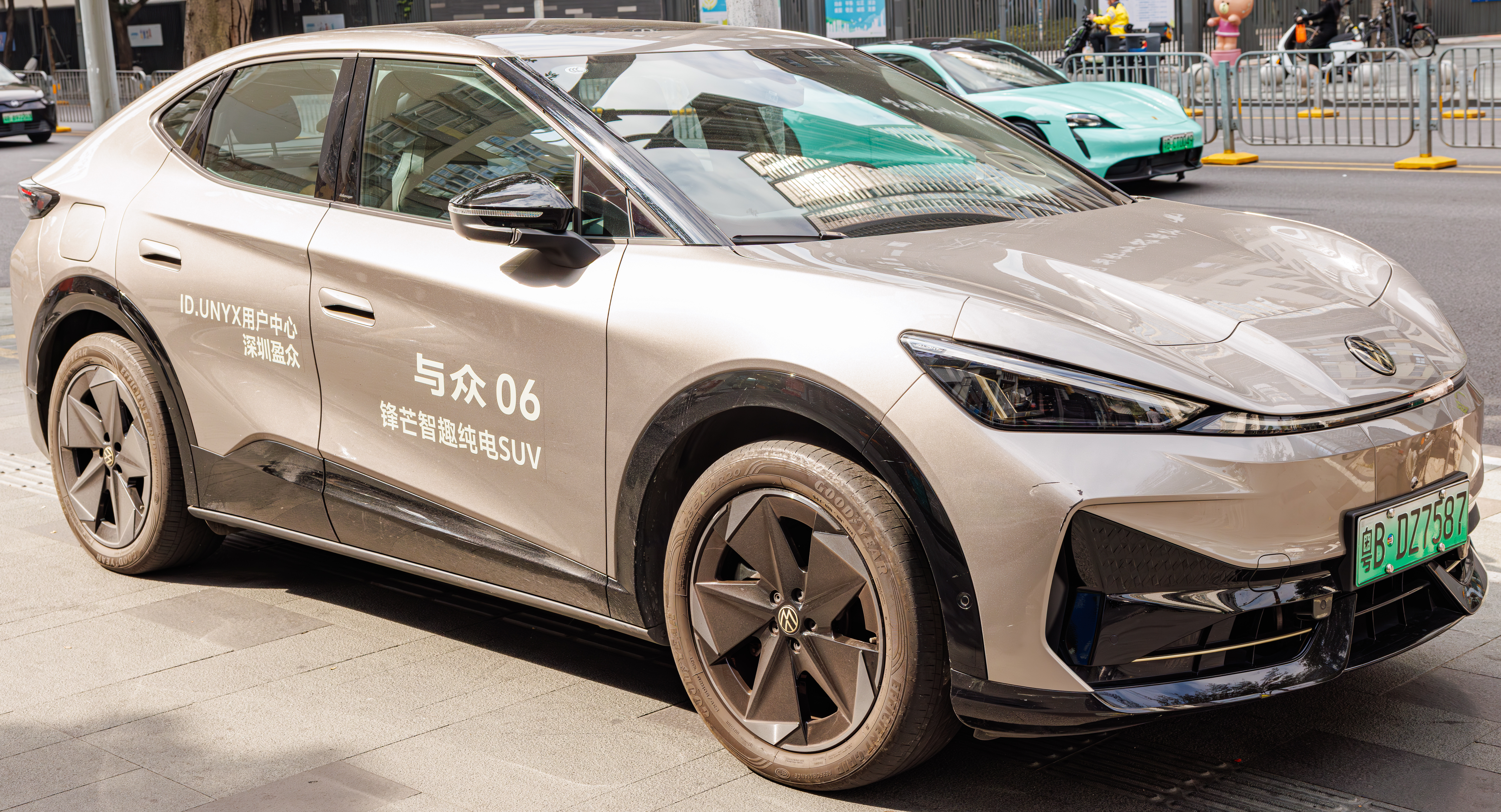
Volkswagen ID. Unyx (Front)

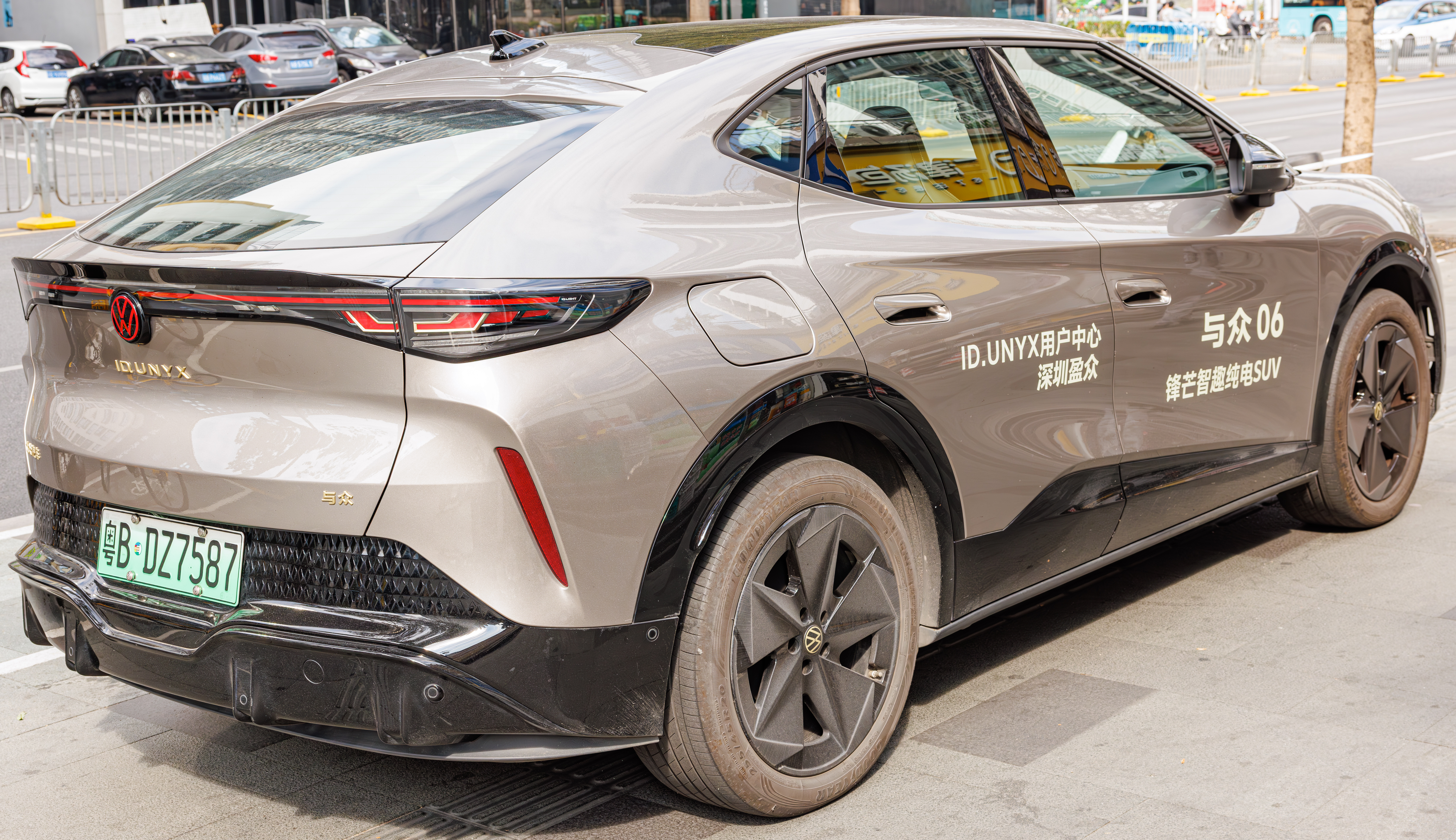
Volkswagen ID. Unyx (Rear)

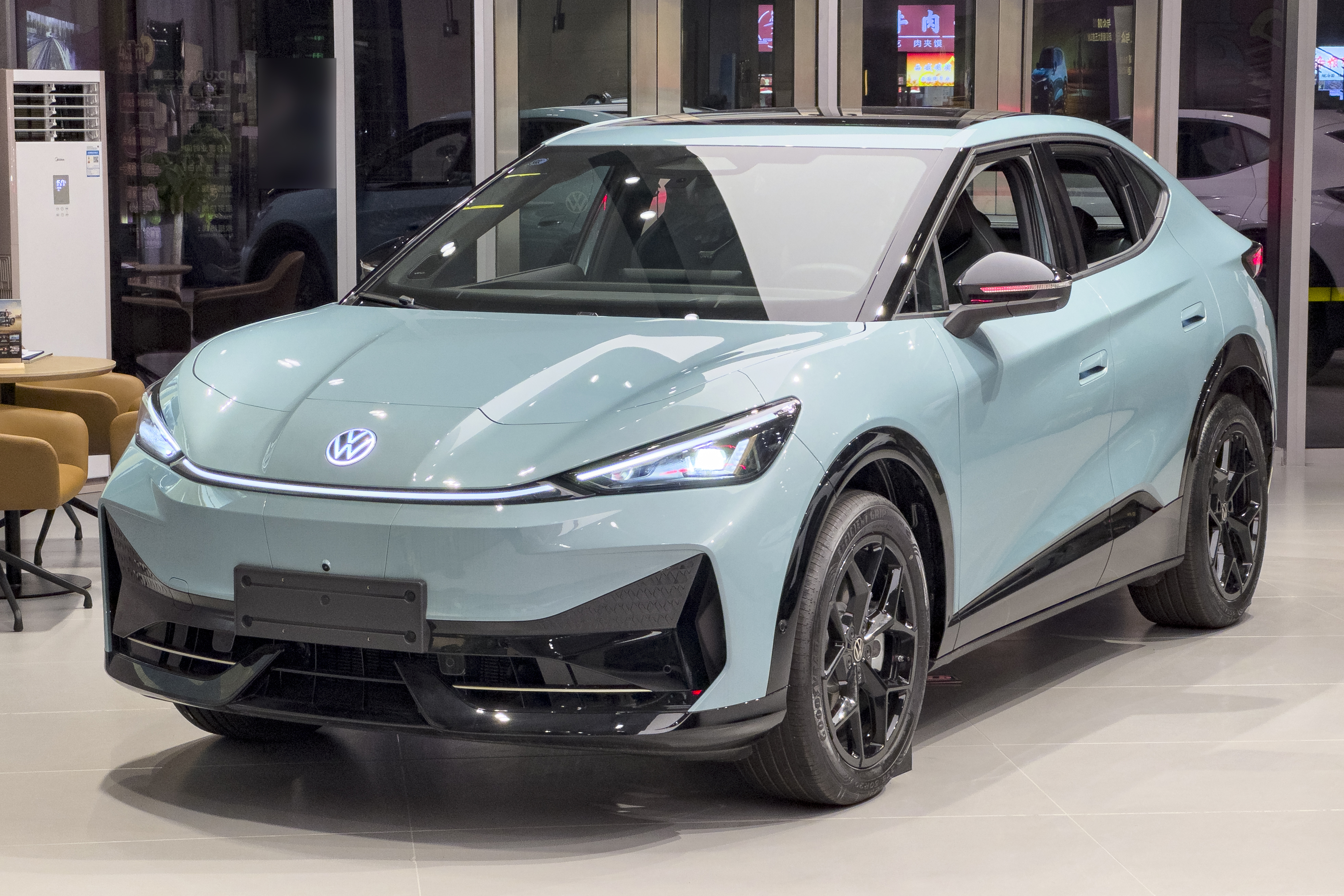
Volkswagen ID. Unyx 06 (Front)

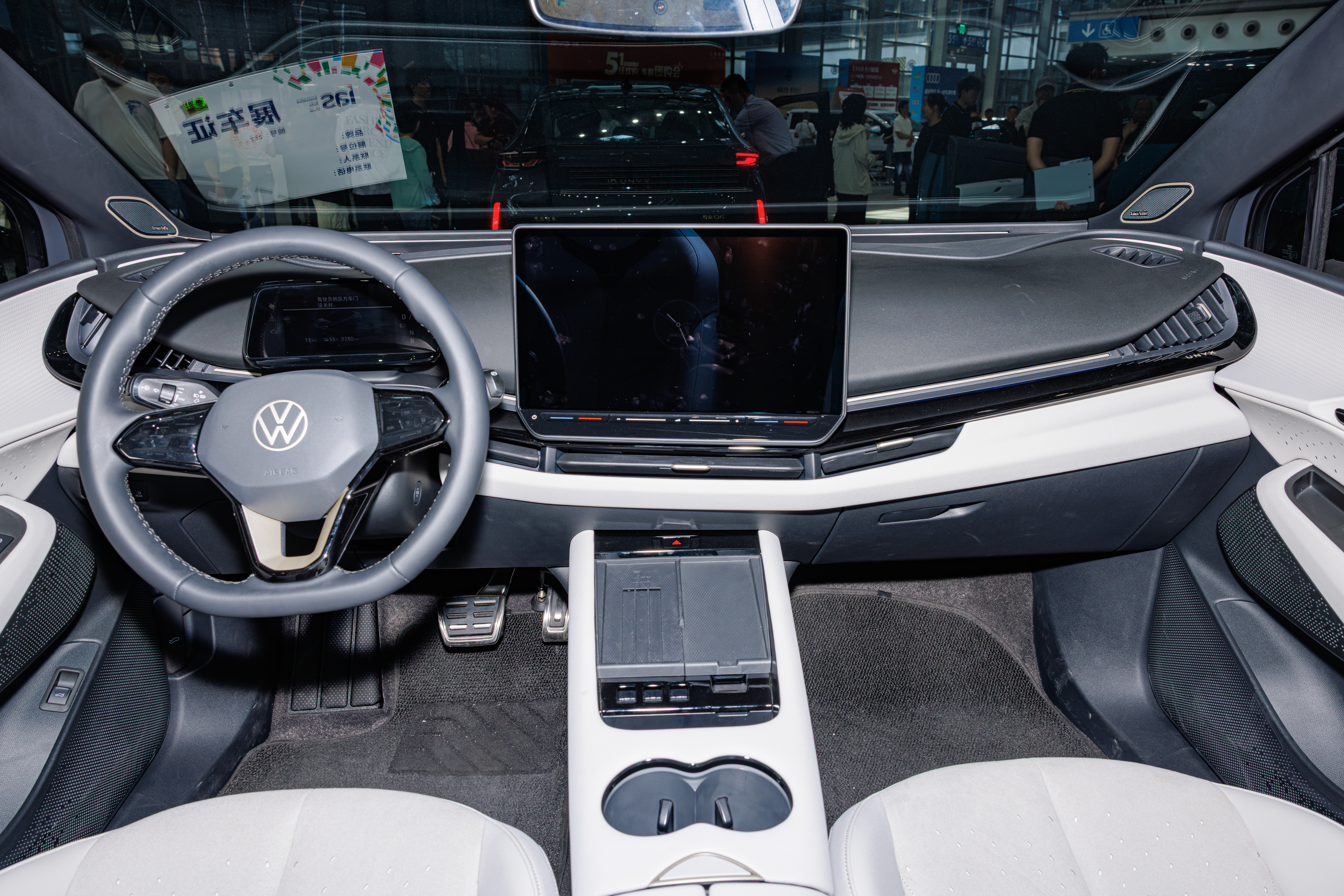
Volkswagen ID. Unyx 06 (Interior)

==== 2026 update ====
An updated version will be launched in the summer of 2026, which will also launch a new entry-level variant with a 58 kWh (210 MJ) battery pack providing providing a 435 km (270 mi) of range. It will also include a larger digital instrument cluster and a new Android-based infotainment system.

=== Safety ===
The Tavascan does not qualify for a five-star ANCAP rating, with an automatic low score in the "safety assist", category, as it lacked safety assist features found various other cars, despite high scores in other categories.

ANCAP test results Cupra Tavascan (2024, aligned with Euro NCAP)
Test	Points	%
Overall:	4 /5 stars	
Adult occupant:	35.78	89%
Child occupant:	42.87	87%
Pedestrian:	50.82	80%
Safety assist:	12.14	67%

ANCAP test results Cupra Tavascan MY26 (2024, aligned with Euro NCAP)
Test	Points	%
Overall:	4 /5 stars	
Adult occupant:	35.78	89%
Child occupant:	42.87	87%
Pedestrian:	50.82	80%
Safety assist:	14.16	78%

Euro NCAP test results Cupra Tavascan 250 kW (LHD) (2024)
Test	Points	%
Overall:	5 /5 stars	
Adult occupant:	35.8	89%
Child occupant:	42.2	86%
Pedestrian:	50.8	80%
Safety assist:	14.3	79%

C-NCAP test results 2025 VW ID. Unyx 06 Ultra Long Range
Category		%
Overall:	5 /5 stars	90.2%
Occupant protection:		93.91%
Vulnerable road users:		83.53%
Active safety:		88.41%

== Sales and production figures ==
Year	Sales		Production	
Year	ID. Unyx 06	Tavascan	ID. Unyx 06	Tavascan
2024	2,341	6,198		27,172
2025	9,434	35,929		31,254
