= XPeng L03 =

Electric compact crossover SUV

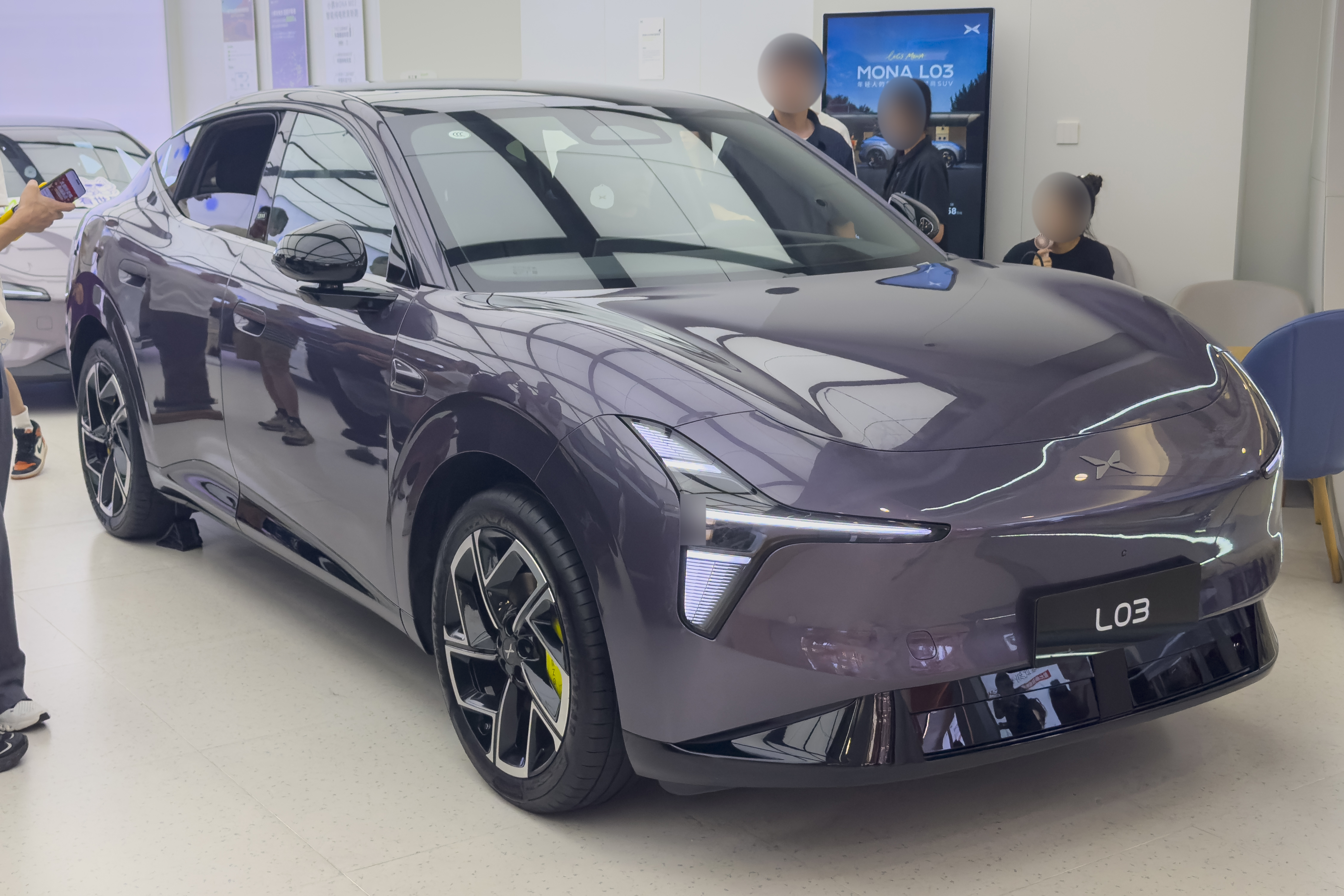

Overview
- Manufacturer: XPeng
- Model code: D03
- Also called: XPeng Mona L03 (China)
- Production: 2026–present
- Assembly: China: Zhaoqing; Indonesia: Purwakarta, West Java (HIM)
- Designer: JuanMa Lopez

Body and chassis
- Class: Mid-size SUV (D)
- Body style: 5-door coupe SUV
- Layout: Battery electric: Rear-motor, rear-wheel-drive; Dual-motors, four-wheel-drive; Range-extended EV: Front-engine Rear-motor, rear-wheel-drive
- Related: XPeng Mona M03; XPeng Mona L05

Powertrain
- Engine: Gasoline range extender: 1.5 L H15R I4
- Electric motor: 183 kW Luxshare TZ200XY01D03X PMSM
- Power output: 241–382 hp (180–285 kW; 244–387 PS)
- Hybrid drivetrain: Series plug-in hybrid (EREV)
- Battery: 37.2 kWh Eve Energy LFP (EREV); 56 kWh CALB LFP; 58.3 kWh CALB LFP (export); 69 kWh CALB LFP; 71 kWh CALB LFP (export)
- Electric range: 215–249 km (134–155 mi) (EREV, WLTP); 315–325 km (196–202 mi) (EREV, CLTC); 440–520 km (273–323 mi) (EV, WLTP); 530–600 km (329–373 mi) (EV, NEDC); 525–650 km (326–404 mi) (EV, CLTC)

Dimensions
- Wheelbase: 2,850 mm (112.2 in)
- Length: 4,650–4,672 mm (183.1–183.9 in)
- Width: 1,920 mm (75.6 in)
- Height: 1,600 mm (63.0 in)
- Curb weight: 1,855 kg (4,090 lb)

The XPeng L03, or the XPeng Mona L03 (Chinese: 小鹏MONA L03; pinyin: Xiǎopéng MONA L03) in China, is a battery electric and range-extended coupe SUV produced by XPeng.

== Overview ==
XPeng filed the Mona L03 with the Ministry of Industry and Information Technology on 9 April 2026. It is the second model in XPeng's Mona series, after the M03. The Mona L03 sits below the G6. It is expected to launch later into 2026 and is speculated to start at 150,000 yuan. The L03 does not have a specific body length. The L03 debuted on 25 June 2026. It is slightly smaller than the G6, which is 81–103 mm (3–4 in) longer, is the same width, and 50 mm (2 in) taller. Pre-sales commenced on 2 July 2026, for a market launch on 16 July.

=== Design ===
The L03 carries over the design language used by the M03, including the M03's T-shaped headlights. It adopts a coupé SUV design. The front bumper features a mesh-like structure inside and also has an active air intake. It features a continuous, rounded waistline design. The wheel arches and side skirts were also given raised lines. The electric version of the L03 has a drag coefficient of 0.228 C_{d}, which XPeng says was reduced through 22 aerodynamic optimizations including active grille shutters, which results in up to 59 km (37 mi) more range.

The L03 is available with a ROAM aesthetics package, which according to XPeng was designed by a Gen Z product manager to appeal to younger customers. It is available with Aurora Purple, Star Dusk Purple, or Smoked Plum Jam paint options, and features the addition of a body kit with body color painted splitter and diffuser elements, a black ducktail spoiler, black badging with unique logos on the fenders, 20-inch wheels, and body-color painted calipers. The interior is available in two exclusive two-tone color options: Viola Purple or Cherry Blossom Mist upholstery, which feature unique perforations and ROAM embroidery and orange stitching. Additionally, it adds a faux suede headliner and cat pawprint doorsill inserts.

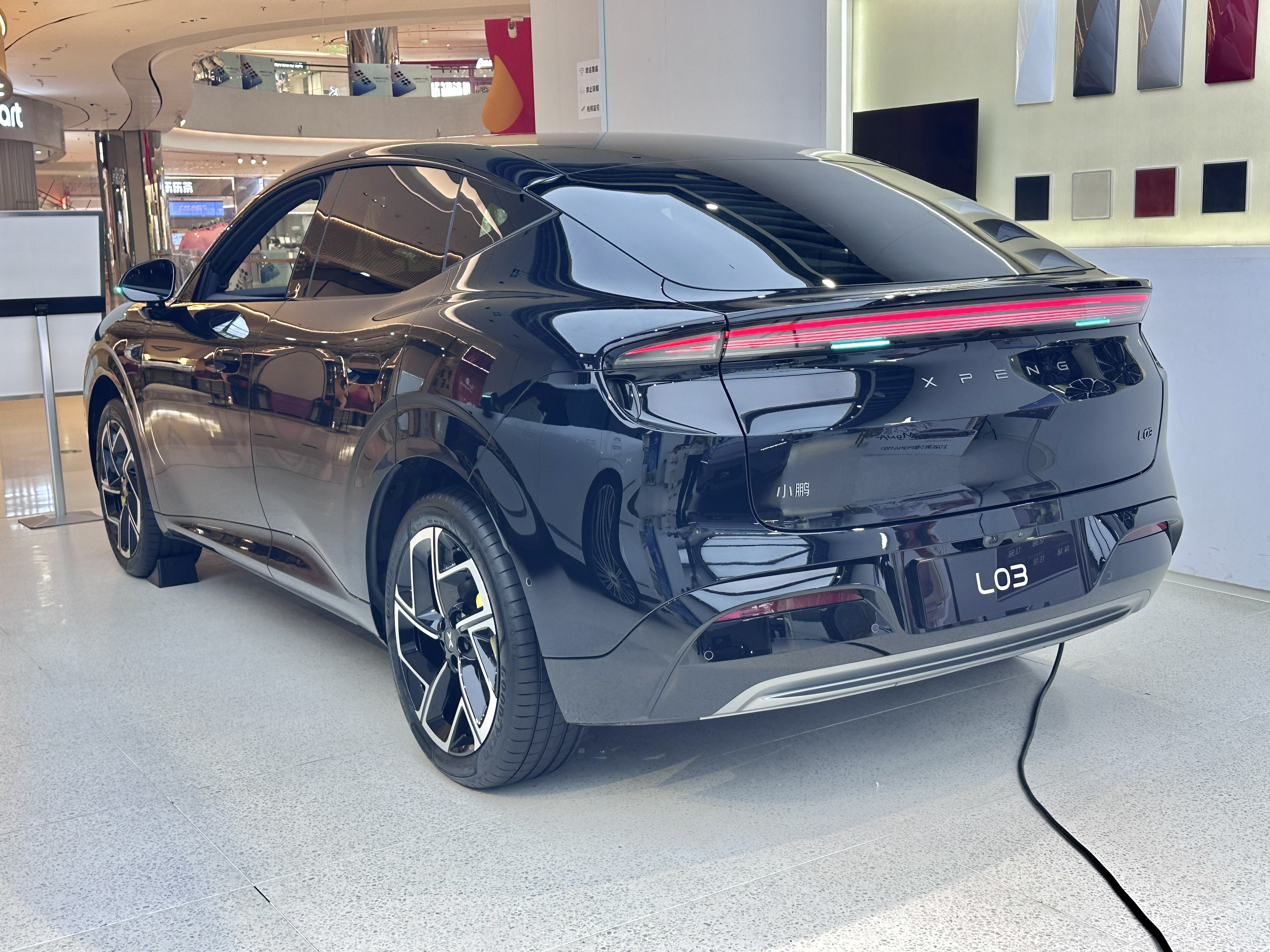
Rear view

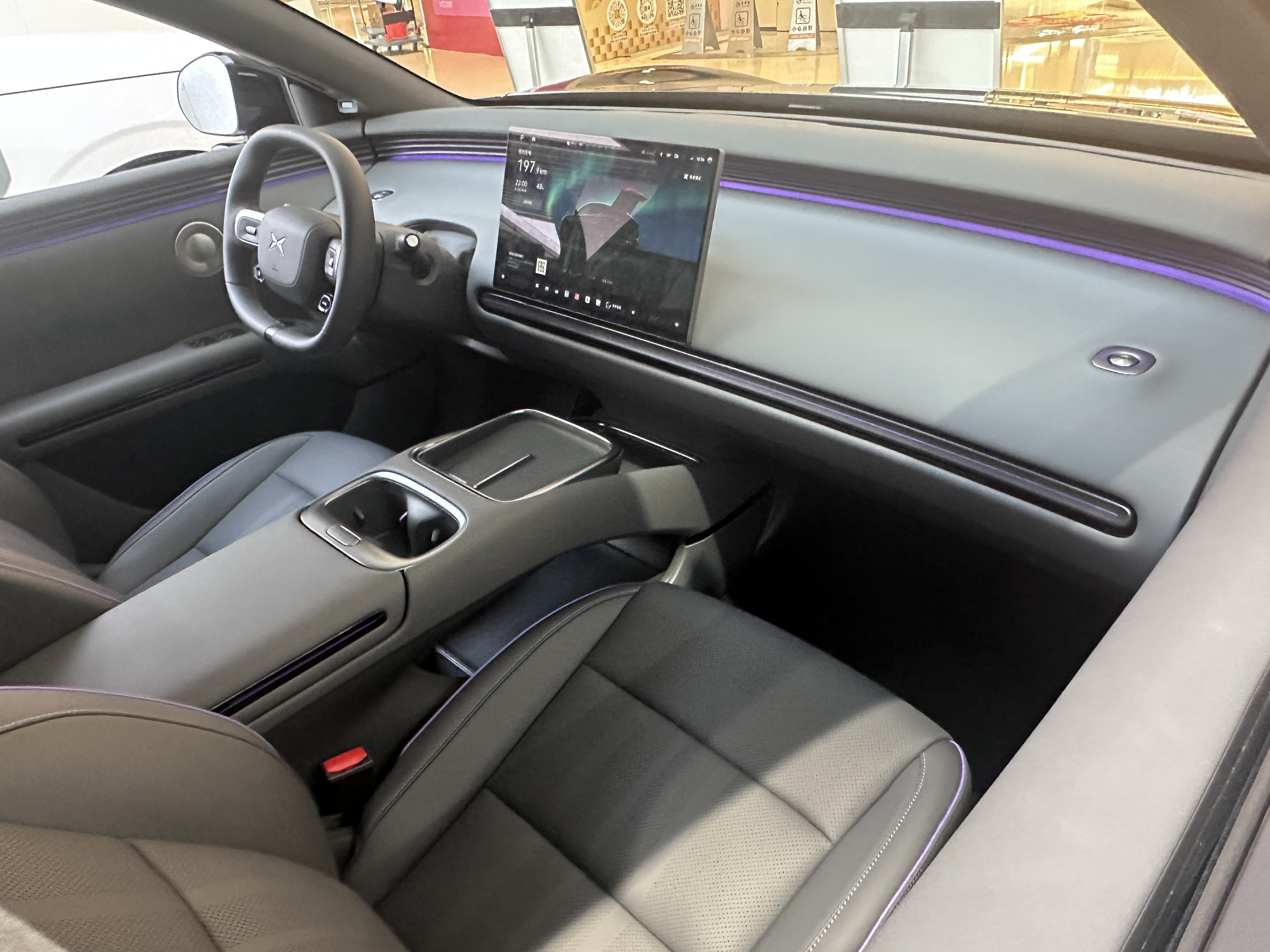
Interior

=== Features ===
The L03 uses cameras placed in multiple locations, being placed in the front bumper and fenders, the rear, and on the side mirrors. The mirrors use a frameless design, with the door handles using a semi-hidden design. The L03 uses 18 or optional 20-inch wheels with fluorescent yellow painted brake calipers paired with 225/60 and 245/45 tires, respectively. It uses XPeng's VLA 2.0 vision-based advanced driver assistance system. All models come equipped standard with one of XPeng's self-developed Turing ADAS chips for 750 TOPS of performance, which can be upgraded to 2 Turing chips in Ultra SE models for a total of 1500 TOPS. It uses a sensor-suite consisting of 3 mmWave radars, 11 cameras including 2 high-resolution front-facing binocular cameras, and 12 ultrasonic sensors.

The interior of the L03 features a 15.6-inch 2.5K-resolution central infotainment touchscreen and a 26.8-inch windshield heads-up display equipped as standard, both powered by a Mediatek MT8676 SoC. The center console has twin-50W active-cooled wireless charging pads and 60W USB-C charging ports. Both front-row seats have heating, ventilation, and memory functions as standard; additionally, the front passenger seat has a 'zero-gravity' recline mode, featuring a 4-way adjustable legrest and 14-point massaging. It has a 1.31 m^{2} (14.1 sq ft) panoramic sunroof, frameless doors, a 1000W+ 20-speaker sound system featuring dual driver's headrest speakers, and the standard dual-zone climate control system uses a heat pump for heating. The interior also features several accessory attachment points, including five ¼-inch thread holes, 8 magnetic points, seatback tablet holder slot with charging ports, and 3 fragrance holders. It has 539 L (19.0 cu ft) of rear cargo space, which expands to 1,640 L (57.9 cu ft) with the rear seats folded down, and electric versions have a 102-litre (3.6 cu ft) frunk. Export models are rated at 367 L (13.0 cu ft) of rear cargo capacity and 89-litre (3.1 cu ft) frunk.

== Powertrain and chassis ==
The L03 is available with both battery electric and range-extender powertrains. All versions of the L03 use a rear-mounted electric motor produced by Luxshare codenamed TZ200XY01D03X that has a rated power output of 94 horsepower (70 kW; 95 PS) and a peak power output of 245 horsepower (183 kW; 248 PS) and 280 N⋅m (207 lb⋅ft) of torque. It has a top speed of 180 km/h (110 mph). In Europe, rear-wheel-drive models produce 241 horsepower (180 kW; 244 PS). An all-wheel-drive version is also offered exclusively in Europe, adding a second motor for an additional 141 horsepower (105 kW; 143 PS), giving the all-wheel-drive version a total output of 382 horsepower (285 kW; 387 PS).

The range-extender model is equipped with a 1.5-liter naturally aspirated port-injected inline-4 gasoline engine outputting 91 hp (68 kW; 92 PS) at 5,200 rpm and 135 N⋅m (100 lb⋅ft) of torque at 3,400–4,000 rpm which does not directly power the wheels, instead turning a generator with a rated sustained output of 55 kW. It has a 37.2 kWh LFP battery capable of 315 km (196 mi) electric-only range on the CLTC cycle and a total range of 1,330 km (826 mi). It can recharge from 10–80% in 15 minutes. In Europe, it is capable of driving 215 km (134 mi) with electric power only on the WLTP cycle, and when paired with its 42-liter fuel tank, is capable of driving 1,017 km (632 mi) on the WLTP cycle when using both the engine and motor.

In China, the battery electric version is available with a choice of two CALB-supplied LFP battery packs. They come in capacities of 56 kWh or 69 kWh, corresponding to CLTC range ratings of 525 or 625 km (326 or 388 mi), respectively. Both packs are capable of charging from 10–80% in 19 minutes. XPeng claims the electric version has a drivetrain efficiency of 92.3%.

European models also use CALB-supplied LFP packs, but use a 58.3 kWh battery in place of the 56 kWh battery and a 71.2 kWh battery in place of the 69 kWh battery. The 58.3kWh battery is only available with rear-wheel-drive models, and is capable of 445 km (277 mi) on the WLTP cycle. The 71.2 kWh battery is available for both rear-wheel-drive and all-wheel-drive models, being capable of 520 km (323 mi) and 440 km (273 mi) on the WLTP cycle for rear-wheel-drive and all-wheel-drive models respectively.

The L03 uses MacPherson struts in the front axle and a five-link independent rear suspension with adjustable dampers. It has a turning radius of 5.25 m (17.2 ft).

Specifications
Model	Battery		Power	Torque	Electric range		DCFC			0–100 km/h (62 mph)	Top speed	Kerb weight
Model	Type	Weight	Power	Torque	WLTP	CLTC	Peak	30–80%	10–80%	0–100 km/h (62 mph)	Top speed	Kerb weight
EREV
China	37.2 kWh LFP Eve Energy	289 kg (637 lb)	Rear: TZ200XY01D03X PMSM 246 hp (183 kW; 249 PS)	280 N⋅m (207 lb⋅ft)	249–257 km (155–160 mi)	315–325 km (196–202 mi)	123 kW	10 min	15 min	6.8 s	180 km/h (112 mph)	1,935 kg (4,266 lb)
Export	37.2 kWh LFP Eve Energy	289 kg (637 lb)	239 hp (178 kW; 242 PS)	280 N⋅m (207 lb⋅ft)	215 km (134 mi)	—	—	—	20 min	6.8 s	180 km/h (112 mph)	1,935 kg (4,266 lb)
BEV
China	56 kWh (58.3 kWh gross) LFP CALB	418 kg (922 lb)	Rear: TZ200XY01D03X PMSM 246 hp (183 kW; 249 PS)	280 N⋅m (207 lb⋅ft)	—	525–550 km (326–342 mi)	—	15.5 min	19 min	7.5 s	180 km/h (112 mph)	1,855 kg (4,090 lb)
Export	56 kWh (58.3 kWh gross) LFP CALB	418 kg (922 lb)	218 hp (163 kW; 221 PS)	280 N⋅m (207 lb⋅ft)	445 km (277 mi)		193 kW	—	20 min	7.5 s	180 km/h (112 mph)	1,870 kg (4,120 lb)
China Long range	69 kWh (71.2 kWh gross) LFP CALB	485 kg (1,069 lb)	Rear: TZ200XY01D03X PMSM 246 hp (183 kW; 249 PS)	280 N⋅m (207 lb⋅ft)	—	625–650 km (388–404 mi)		15.5 min	19 min	6.6 s	180 km/h (112 mph)	1,920 kg (4,230 lb)
Export Long range	69 kWh (71.2 kWh gross) LFP CALB	485 kg (1,069 lb)	Rear: TZ200XY01D03X PMSM 246 hp (183 kW; 249 PS)	280 N⋅m (207 lb⋅ft)	520 km (323 mi)	—	236 kW	—	20 min	6.6 s	180 km/h (112 mph)	1,940 kg (4,280 lb)
Export AWD	69 kWh (71.2 kWh gross) LFP CALB	485 kg (1,069 lb)	Front: 180 hp (134 kW; 182 PS) Rear: 246 hp (183 kW; 249 PS)	431 N⋅m (318 lb⋅ft)	440 km (273 mi)	—	236 kW	—	20 min	4.5 s	180 km/h (112 mph)	2,040 kg (4,500 lb)

== Markets ==
=== Australia ===
The L03 was launched in Australia on 23 September 2026, with four variants: BEV RWD Standard Range, PowerX RWD Long Range, BEV RWD Long Range and BEV AWD Performance Ultra.

=== Brunei ===
The L03 was launched in Brunei on 6 November 2026 alongside with the G6 and X9, as part of the brand's entry to the Bruneian market. It is offered in a single variant: BEV RWD Standard Range.

=== Europe ===
XPeng launched the L03 in select European markets in July 2026, alongside its release in China. It is scheduled to launch in the United Kingdom in 2027. The first L03 delivery in Europe was on 20 October 2026 in Paris, France.

=== Philippines ===
The L03 was launched in the Philippines on 25 September 2026 alongside the X9, as part of the brand's entry to the Philippine market. The battery electric version is sold in three trims: Standard Range, Long Range, and Long Range Ultra. The range-extender model is sold as the sole PowerX Long Range trim.

=== Singapore ===
The L03 was launched in Singapore on 11 November 2026 in the sole RWD Plus Long Range variant using the 71.2kWh LFP battery pack. The Singapore-market version is the same as the Export Long Range, but downtuned to 99kW to fit in with Singapore's Category A COE categorisation.

=== Thailand ===
The L03 launched in Thailand on 18 August 2026, available in three trims: Standard Plus, Long Range Plus, and Long Range Ultra.
