= XPeng X9 =

Battery electric minivan

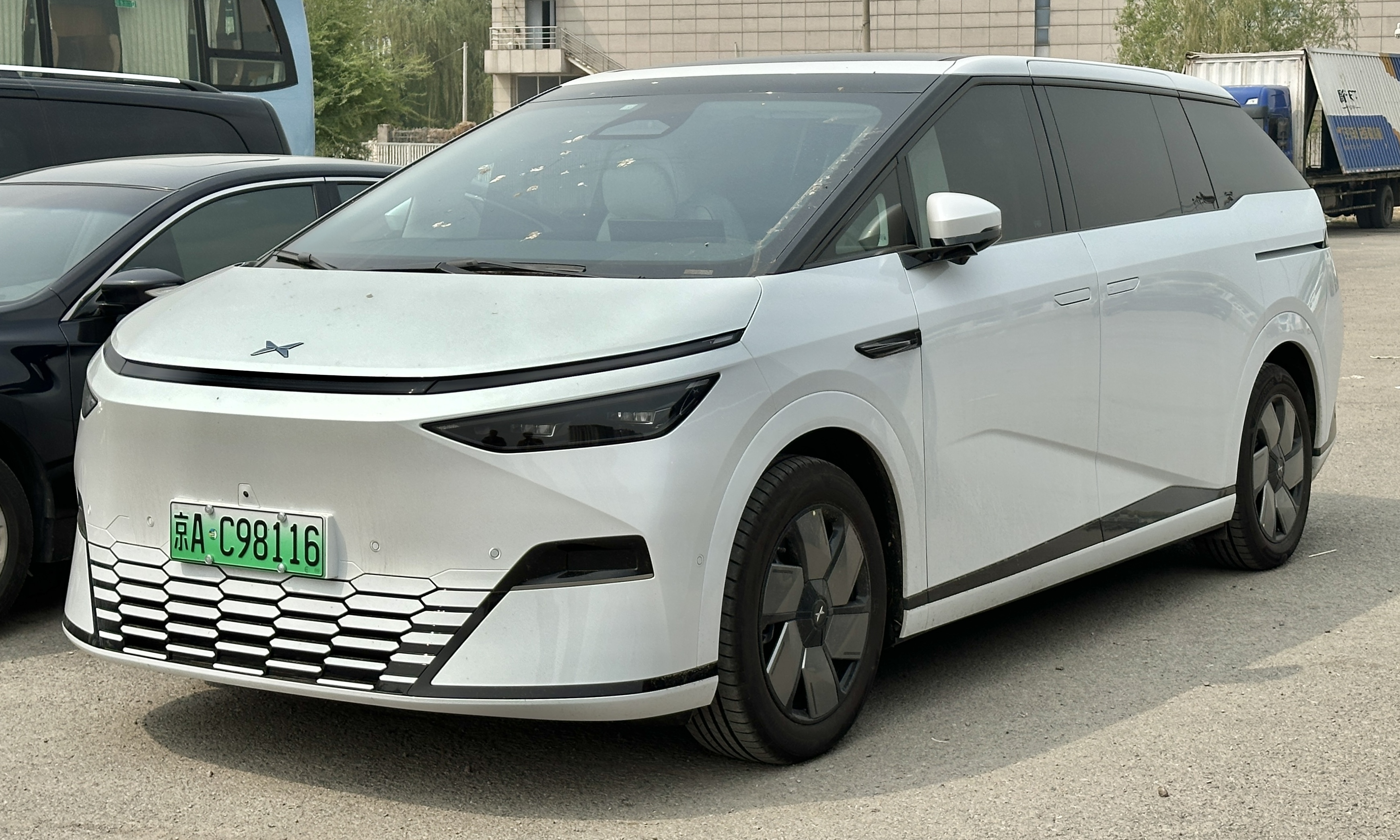

Overview
- Manufacturer: XPeng
- Model code: H93
- Production: 2023–present
- Assembly: China: Guangzhou, Guangdong; Indonesia: Purwakarta, West Java (HIM); Malaysia: Malacca (EPMB)
- Designer: Under the leadership of Emanoel Derta

Body and chassis
- Class: Large minivan
- Body style: 5-door minivan
- Layout: EV; Front-motor, front-wheel drive; Dual-motor all-wheel drive; PHEV (EREV); Front-engine, front-motor, front-wheel-drive
- Platform: SEPA 2.0

Powertrain
- Engine: 1.5 L HDA 4G15T turbocharged I4 (Generator only)
- Electric motor: Permanent magnet synchronous (front), AC induction (rear)
- Power output: 235–370 kW (315–496 hp; 320–503 PS) (Pre-Minorchange); 255–395 kW (342–530 hp; 347–537 PS) (Minorchange); 213 kW (286 hp; 290 PS) (EREV)
- Hybrid drivetrain: Kunpeng Super Electric System (Series hybrid/range extender/plug-in hybrid)
- Battery: Pre-Minorchange: 84.5 kWh LFP Eve Energy; 101.5 kWh NMC CALB; Minorchange: 94.8 kWh LFP CALB; 105 kWh NMC CALB; 110 kWh NMC CALB (Thailand); 63.3 kWh LFP CALB (PHEV)
- Range: 610–702 km (379–436 mi) (CLTC); 580–680 km (360–423 mi) (NEDC); 480–575 km (298–357 mi) (WLTP)
- Plug-in charging: 235-330 kW (DC)

Dimensions
- Wheelbase: 3,160 mm (124.4 in)
- Length: 5,293 mm (208.4 in) (2023-2025); 5,316 mm (209.3 in) (2026 onwards)
- Width: 1,988 mm (78.3 in)
- Height: 1,785 mm (70.3 in)
- Kerb weight: 2,555–2,750 kg (5,633–6,063 lb)

The XPeng X9 (Chinese: 小鹏X9; pinyin: Xiǎopéng X9) is a battery electric and range-extended minivan manufactured by Chinese electric vehicle company XPeng.

== Overview ==
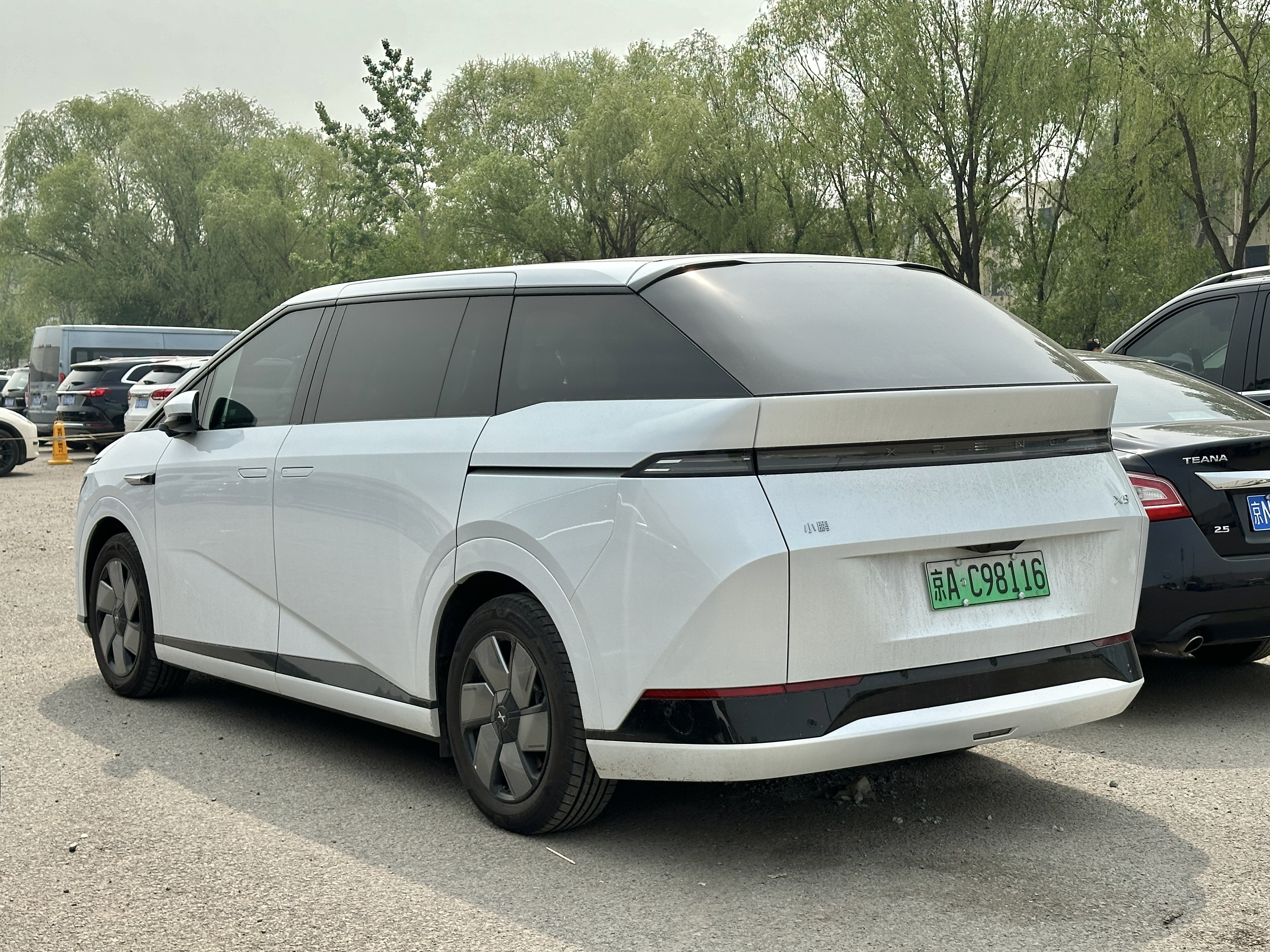
Rear view

The XPeng X9 was initially revealed on 24 October 2023 at its 1024 Tech Day event before its launch at the 2023 Guangzhou Auto Show where pre-orders opened on 17 November. Deliveries began on 1 January 2024 after receiving over 30,000 pre-orders. It sits on the Smart Electric Platform Architecture 2.0 (SEPA 2.0) platform with three rows and 7 seats in a 2-2-3 setup. XPeng is expected to launch a range-extender version of the X9 in the fourth quarter of 2025 equipped with the debuting Kunpeng Super Range Extender system announced in November 2024.

XPeng says the X9's design was inspired by starships. The front of the X9 is closed off, with a lower air intake covered by a body color hexagonal tessellation. It uses a split headlight design, with a light bar stretching across the top of the bumper, and LiDAR units placed in the lower corners of the bumper in the traditional location of fog lights. The windshield is highly sloped with a 21-degree A-pillar angle, and it has a floating roof design with black-painted pillars, and the power sliding doors have a sharply creased character line placed low on the door, and the wheels have optional aerodynamic flat covers. The windows sit flush with the pillars creating a smooth aerodynamic surface, which XPeng claims is the first for an MPV. The rear has an unconventional 23-degree sloped rear window to decrease aerodynamic drag, which combine with other optimizations to allow for a drag coefficient of 0.227 C_{d}. It was originally available with four exterior paint colors: Nebula White, New Moon Silver, Starship Grey, and Midnight Black.

The X9's chassis is made of 2,000 MPa steel and six large aluminium castings manufactured using a 12,000 ton die casting machine, making the chassis' total composition 83% high-strength steel and aluminium. It uses double wishbone front suspension and multilink independent rear suspension, both using dual-chamber air springs capable of 90 mm (3.5 in) of ride height adjustment as standard, allowing for a 37 mm (1.5 in) floor entry height. It has 5 degrees of rear-wheel steering as standard, allowing for a turning radius of 5.4 metres (18 ft).

At launch, the X9 came standard with an ADAS system capable of supervised autonomous driving on highways called XPILOT, which consists of a single Nvidia Orin X chip with 254 TOPS and a sensor suite consisting of three mmWave radars, 11 cameras, and 12 ultrasonic sensors. Higher trims came with the XNGP system capable of supervised autonomous driving in both urban and highway scenarios, which uses two 126-line Robosense LiDAR sensors in the front bumper and a second Nvidia Orin X chip for a total of 508 TOPS. It was initially limited to use in select cities, but later OTA updates allowed for the XNGP system to be used anywhere throughout China by the end of 2024.

=== Interior ===
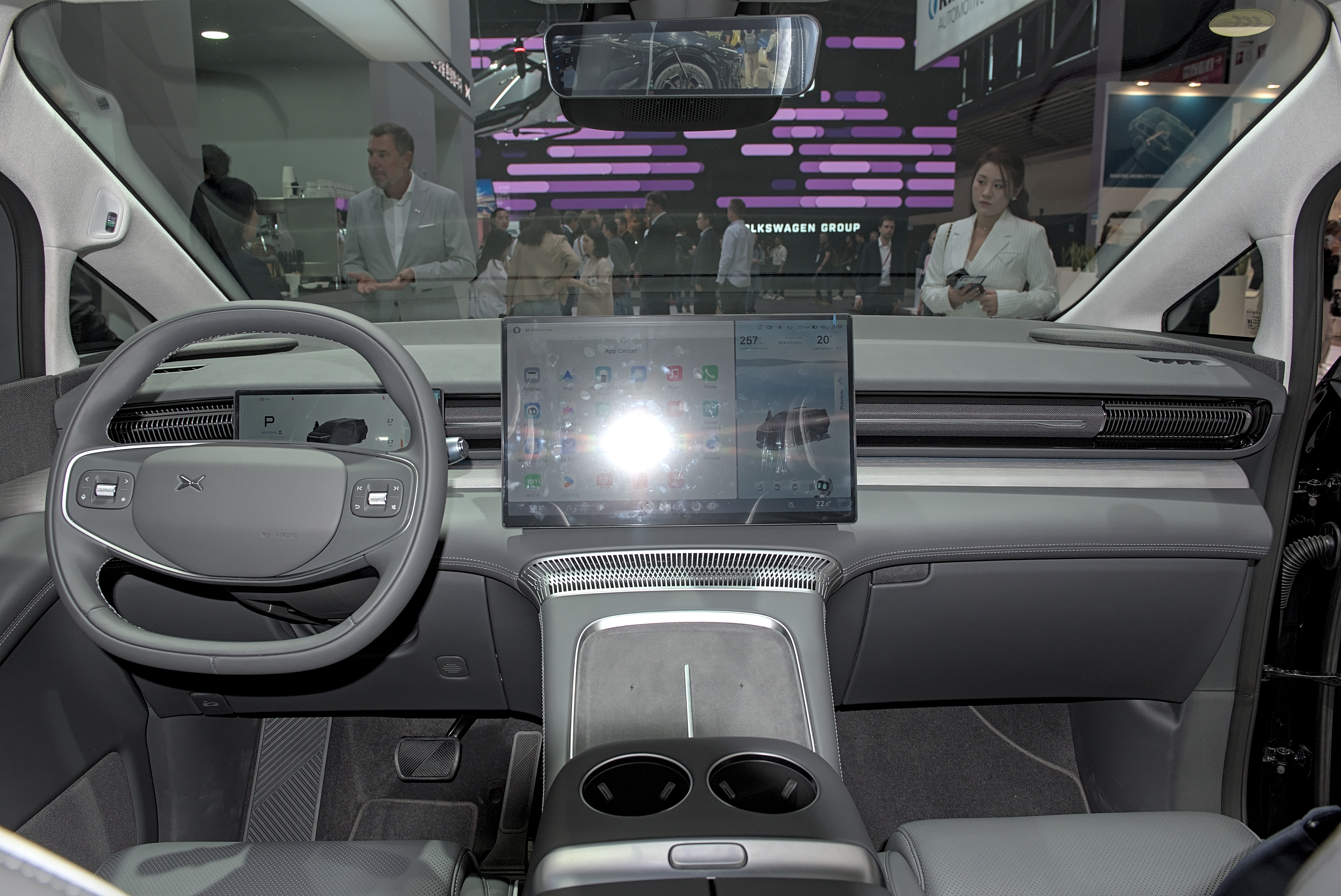
Interior

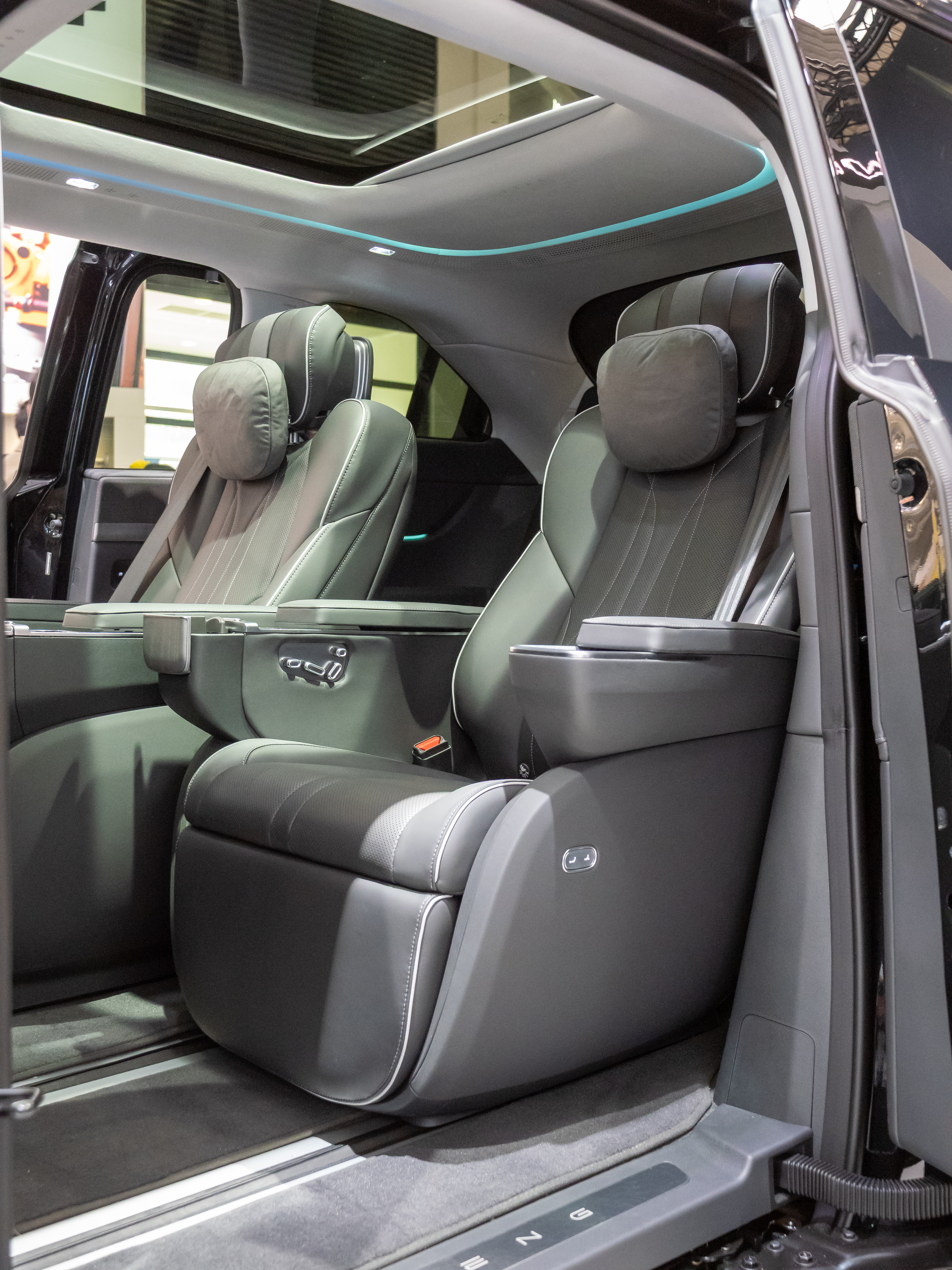
Rear seat

The dashboard contains an integrated 10.25-inch digital instrument cluster behind a two-spoke steering wheel, and a floating 17.3-inch infotainment display which is the first to feature XPeng's XOS Tianji software, powered by a Qualcomm Snapdragon 8295 SoC. The center console connects to the dashboard below the infotainment display with a slotted metallic air vent, and it contains two 50W wireless charging pads with active cooling and two circular cupholders. It has a digital rearview mirror and an individual sunroof for the front row. It is equipped with a 23-speaker 2180 W 7.1.6 surround sound X-opera sound system and five-zone climate control as standard.

The second row seats are captains chairs with either the standard heated power adjustable seats with a 180 mm (7.1 in) aisle, or an optional 'zero-gravity' recline mode with 18-way power adjustment including leg support and massaging functions, which lack an aisle between the seats and instead move forward to allow for third row access. The rear passengers have access to 21.4-inch ceiling mounted fold-down 3K resolution 100% DCI-P3 color gamut display. They also have access to folding tables mounted on the front seatbacks, individual USB-C charging ports, a panoramic sunroof, and a control panel mounted on the back of the center console. It has 10.8 L (0.38 cu ft) refrigerator compartment located in the center console capable of heating and cooling between 0–50 °C (32–122 °F), and is able to cool the compartment from 45 to 18 °C (113 to 64 °F) within five minutes.

The third row has access to two cupholders and a separate climate control zone, and has power headrest and reclining adjustment of up to 176 degrees. The ceiling features a ring surrounding the second and third rows which contains ambient lighting and individual air vents. The third row is power folding including power retracting headrests and collapses backwards into the rear cargo area, creating a flat loading floor and expanding the rear cargo volume from 755 litres (26.7 cu ft) to 2,554 litres (90.2 cu ft) of space.

== 2025 update ==
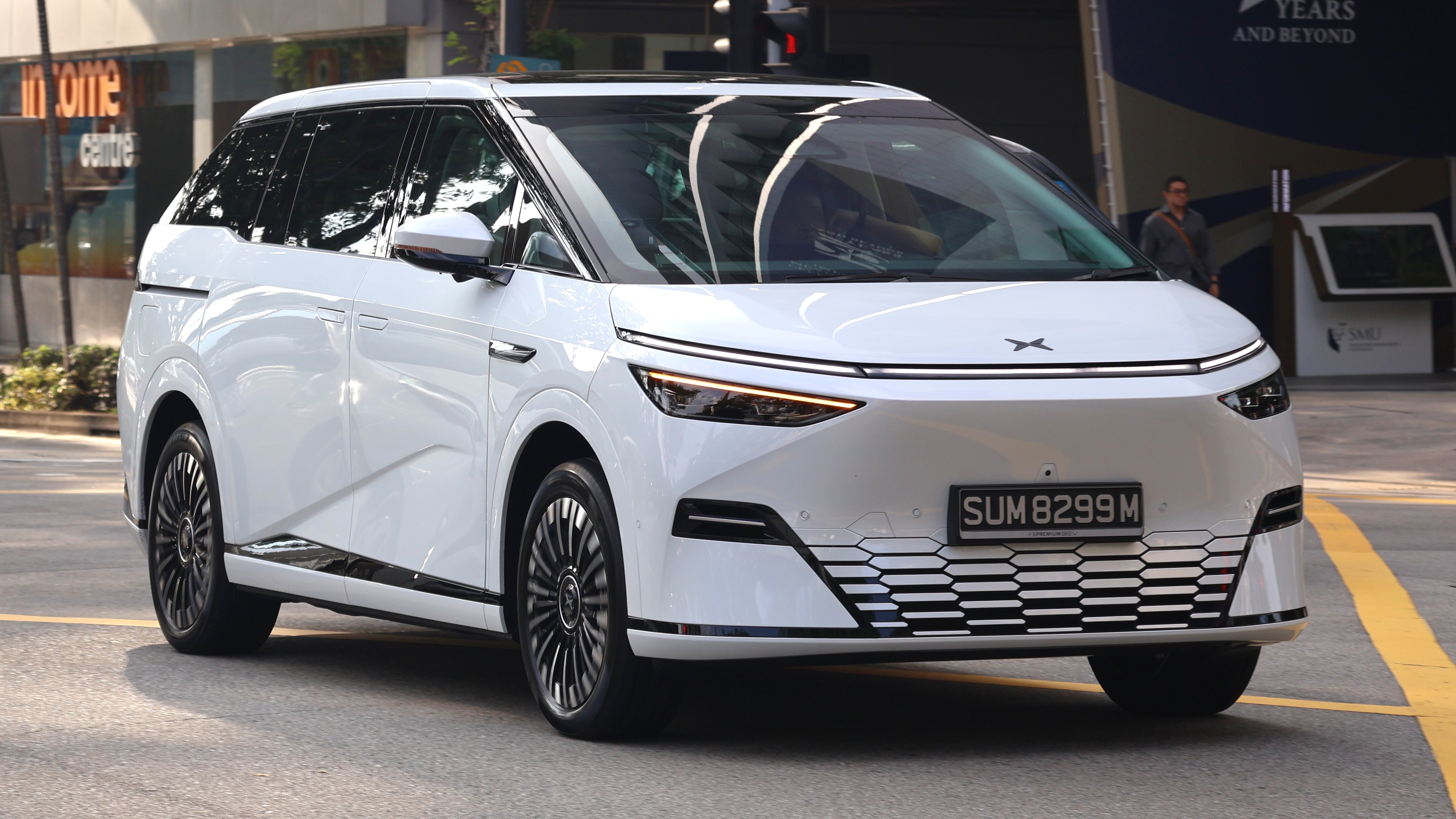
2025 update

The 2025 version of the X9 was revealed on 8 April 2025, with pre-orders opening the same day, and was launched on 15 April. XPeng claims the model has 496 component changes, 35% of the components and design have been changed. The exterior features only minor changes, with two new 19 and 20-inch wheel options with 'anti-spinner' stationary hub logos, soft-close front doors, and three new paint colors: Matte Starship Grey, Nebula Purple, and Galaxy Blue.

It has been upgraded to come standard with the LiDAR-less Hawk Eye ADAS system first seen in the P7+, so the two bumper mounted LiDARs have been replaced with decorative blanking panels, and teal-colored autonomous driving indicator lights have been added in locations including the side mirrors. The active suspension system became equipped with a '6D AI anti-motion sickness' algorithm that aims to minimize pitching moments and body roll.

The second row seats became equipped have a permanent 165 mm (6.5 in) aisle space in between the two captains chair seats, which were previously directly side-by-side. The front two rows became equipped with 14-way power adjustment, heating, ventilation, and 10-point massage functions or optional 16-point massaging, along with the 'zero-gravity' recline mode all as standard. With the new seat design, the 'zero-gravity' mode can operate even when all seats are occupied, as the seats will dynamically adjust to accommodate for each passenger's positioning. The third row seats became standard with a heating function.

XPeng says that various button and trim surfaces have been improved, with some using a physical vapor deposition manufacturing process, and an additional 3.2 m^{2} (34 sq ft) of soft-touch surfaces for a total of 26.6 m^{2} (286 sq ft). The 21.4-inch rear passenger screen became certified by TÜV Rheinland to have 50% reduced blue light levels and has an adjustable tilt angle of up to 75 degrees. The second row became equipped with a childproofed 220V outlet capable of 2.2 kW of output, 50W chargers, and the V2L system's output has been increased to 6 kW. XPeng claims it made 56 changes to improve NVH characteristics, some of which can be applied to older models through an OTA update.

The powertrain has been updated to use new larger battery packs with faster charging capabilities, while the motor configurations carry over from before. The smaller battery was increased to 94.8 kWh and capable of 5C charging, while the larger battery is 105 kWh with 3C charging. It has a maximum configurable range of 740 kilometres (460 mi).

XPeng is offering 'Hardware OTA' upgrade packages for owners of older models to install some new features, including a paid upgrade for the new 'zero gravity' seat design, the addition of teal autonomous indicator lights, and a free upgrade to the sound insulation.

== 2026 facelift and EREV ==
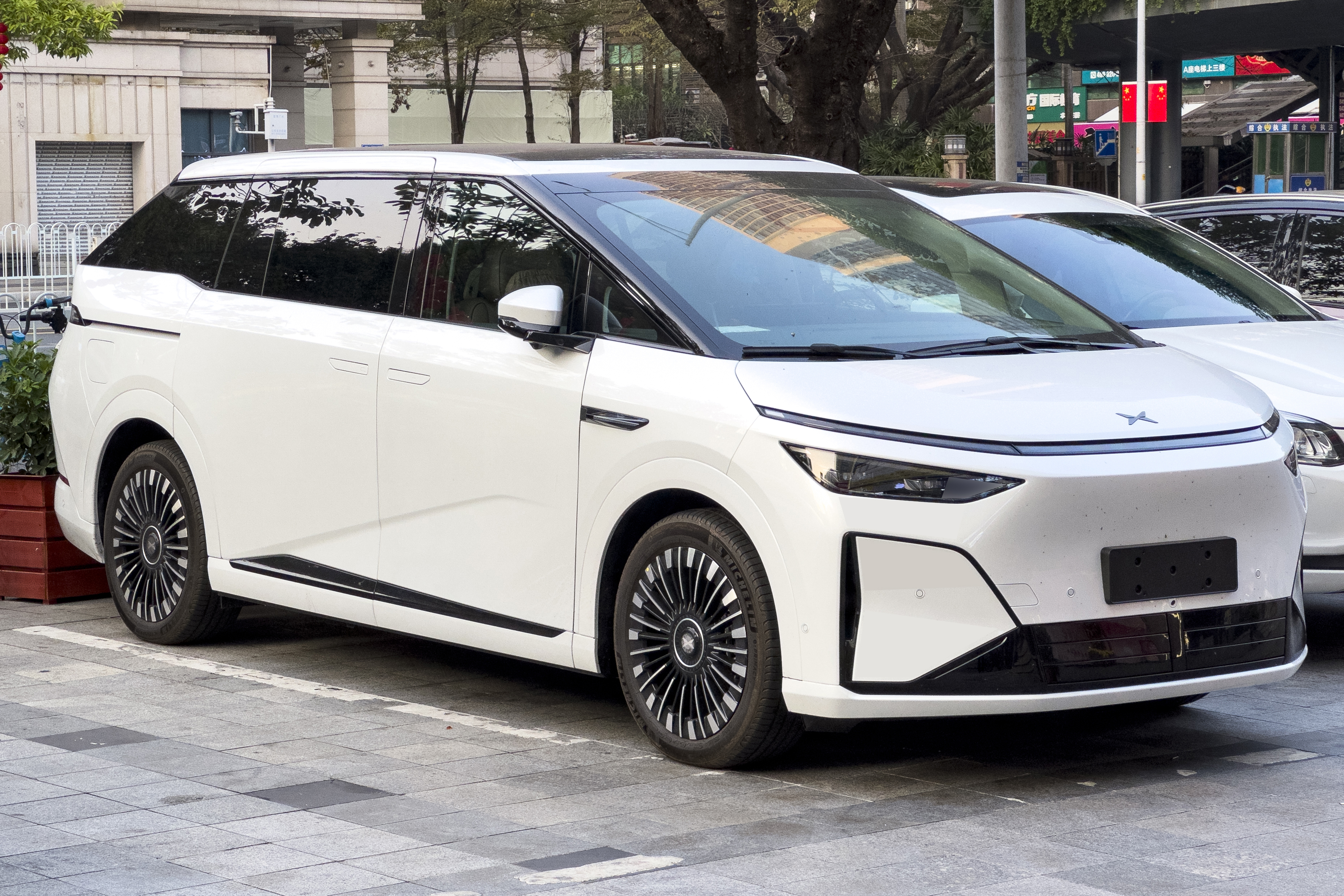
2026 facelift

Featuring restyled front and rear bumpers, the X9 2026 model year was first introduced with the range extended (EREV) variant powered by a Huawei co-developed 1.5 liter turbocharged intercooled engine as a range extender working with a high-voltage oil-cooled generator and an 800V silicon-carbide coaxial electric motor, the powertrain produces a combined torque output of 465 N·m with an acceleration from 0 to 100 km/h in 8 seconds.

The pure electric version of the 2026 model year Xpeng X9 shares the same appearance as the EREV variant and was launched later in March 2026. The 2026 model year X9 EV is equipped with a 800V high-voltage system, and a dual-chamber air suspension. The entry-level model has a single electric motor powering the front axle producing 235 kW (315 hp). The 4WD variants features a dual motor setup developing a combined output of 370 kW (496 hp). Two battery variants are available depending on the trim level, a 94.8 kWh LFP battery and a 110 kWh ternary NMC battery. The CLTC range of the 2026 model year X9 EV is 650 to 750 km.

== Powertrain ==
The X9 originally came exclusively with fully electric powertrain options at its launch in 2024, with a range-extender variant is expected to launch in late 2025.

The X9 comes standard with a 315 horsepower (235 kW; 319 PS) front permanent magnet synchronous motor, which can supplemented by a 181 hp (135 kW; 184 PS) induction motor at the rear for an all-wheel drive system with a total of 496 horsepower (370 kW; 503 PS).

Battery options at launch in 2024 include a 84.5 kWh lithium iron phosphate (LFP) battery pack supplied by Eve Energy and a 101.5 kWh NMC battery pack from CALB. The XPeng X9's SEPA 2.0 platform supports an 800V silicon carbide electrical architecture, which enables 3C DC fast charging for 300 km (186 mi) of range within 10 minutes of charging time. Depending on different battery and electric motor combinations, X9 has 610 km (379 mi), 640 km (398 mi), or 702 km (436 mi) of CLTC range.

In 2025, the battery packs were updated with larger capacities and faster charging, while the motor configuration remained the same as before. The smaller battery was increased to a 94.8 kWh LFP pack providing 650 km (404 mi) of range, and is capable of 5C charging for up to 405 km (252 mi) of range in 10 minutes. The larger battery is a 105 kWh NMC pack providing 740 km (460 mi) or 702 km (436 mi) of range for front-wheel and all-wheel drive variants, respectively, and is capable of 3C charging for up to 400 km (249 mi) of range in 13 minutes.

The range-extender variant uses XPeng's Kunpeng Super Range Extender system first announced in November 2024, and the X9 is the first vehicle to use the system. It uses a 1.5-liter turbocharged petrol engine outputting 110 kW (148 hp; 150 PS) and supplied by Harbin Dongan Auto Engine paired with an LFP battery pack weighing 445 kg (981 lb) supplied by CALB powering a 282 horsepower (210 kW; 286 PS) front motor, for a top speed of 180 km/h (112 mph). XPeng says that they used over 1,000 vehicles tested for over 800 days to cover 20 million km (12 million mi) in test mileage in 20 countries.

Specifications
Battery	Year	Drive	Power	Torque	Range			10–80% DCFC time	0–100 km/h (62 mph) time	Top speed
Battery	Year	Drive	Power	Torque	CLTC	NEDC	WLTP	10–80% DCFC time	0–100 km/h (62 mph) time	Top speed
84.5 kWh LFP Eve Energy	2024	FWD	235 kW (315 hp; 320 PS)	450 N⋅m (332 lb⋅ft)	610 km (379 mi)	580 km (360 mi)	480 km (298 mi)	20 min	7.7 sec	200 km/h (124 mph)
101.5 kWh NMC CALB	2024	FWD	235 kW (315 hp; 320 PS)	450 N⋅m (332 lb⋅ft)	702 km (436 mi)	680 km (420 mi)	575 km (357 mi)	20 min	7.7 sec	200 km/h (124 mph)
94.8 kWh LFP CALB	2025	FWD	235 kW (315 hp; 320 PS)	450 N⋅m (332 lb⋅ft)	650 km (404 mi)	—	—	11.7 min	7.7 sec	200 km/h (124 mph)
105 kWh NMC CALB	2025	FWD	235 kW (315 hp; 320 PS)	450 N⋅m (332 lb⋅ft)	740 km (460 mi)	—	—	20 min	7.7 sec	200 km/h (124 mph)
94.8 kWh LFP CALB	2026 (Export)	FWD	255 kW (342 hp; 347 PS)	450 N⋅m (332 lb⋅ft)	—	620 km (385 mi)	535 km (332 mi)	12 min	8.2 sec	200 km/h (124 mph)
110 kWh NMC CALB	2026 (Export)	FWD	255 kW (342 hp; 347 PS)	450 N⋅m (332 lb⋅ft)	—	715 km (444 mi)	615 km (382 mi)	12 min	7.75 sec	200 km/h (124 mph)
101.5 kWh NMC CALB	2024	AWD	Front: 235 kW (315 hp; 320 PS) Rear: 135 kW (181 hp; 184 PS) 370 kW (496 hp; 503 PS)	Front: 450 N⋅m (332 lb⋅ft) Rear: 190 N⋅m (140 lb⋅ft) 640 N⋅m (472 lb⋅ft)	640 km (398 mi)	—	—	20 min	5.7 sec	200 km/h (124 mph)
105 kWh NMC	2025	AWD	Front: 235 kW (315 hp; 320 PS) Rear: 135 kW (181 hp; 184 PS) 370 kW (496 hp; 503 PS)	Front: 450 N⋅m (332 lb⋅ft) Rear: 190 N⋅m (140 lb⋅ft) 640 N⋅m (472 lb⋅ft)	702 km (436 mi)	—	—	20 min	5.7 sec	200 km/h (124 mph)
110 kWh NMC	2026 (Export)	AWD	Front: 135 kW (181 hp; 184 PS) Rear: 255 kW (342 hp; 347 PS) 395 kW (530 hp; 537 PS)	Front: 190 N⋅m (140 lb⋅ft) Rear: 450 N⋅m (332 lb⋅ft) 640 N⋅m (472 lb⋅ft)	—	670 km (420 mi)	580 km (360 mi)	12 min	5.9 sec	200 km/h (124 mph)

== Markets ==
=== Australia ===
The X9 was launched in Australia on 22 July 2026, with two variants: FWD Standard Range and AWD Performance.

=== Brunei ===
The X9 was launched in Brunei on 6 November 2026 alongside with the G6 and L03, as part of the brand's entry to the Bruneian market. It is offered in a single variant: FWD Standard Range.

=== Hong Kong ===
On 17 May 2024, the X9 made its official debut in Hong Kong alongside the Xpeng G6. It has support for Cantonese voice recognition, and deliveries commenced in mid-2024.

The global launch event for the 2025 X9 update was held on 15 April 2025, and the RHD Hong Kong version gains the updated models improvements but differs with the lack of soft-close front doors, carryover second row control panel design, and the omission of the second third-row ISOFIX mounting point.

=== Indonesia ===
The X9 was launched in Indonesia on 23 July 2025 at the 32nd Gaikindo Indonesia International Auto Show, alongside the Xpeng G6. Locally assembled in Indonesia, it is available with three variants: Standard Range Pro, Long Range Pro and Long Range Pro+.

The facelifted X9 was launched in Indonesia on 28 June 2026. Locally assembled, it introduced several exterior and cabin refinements, including an Active Grille Shutter and an upgraded 110 kWh battery option. It is available in three variants: Standard Range Pro, Long Range Pro and Long Range Pro+.

=== Malaysia ===
The X9 was launched in Malaysia on 5 March 2025, with three variants: the Standard Range 2WD Pro, the Long Range 2WD Pro, and the Long Range 2WD Pro Plus. Local CKD assembly commenced on 5 June 2026 at contract manufacturer EPMB's assembly plant in Malacca.

The facelifted X9 was launched in Malaysia on 9 June 2026. Initially imported from China, it is available with three variants: 2WD Standard Range, 2WD Long Range and AWD Performance.

=== Philippines ===
The X9 was launched in the Philippines on 25 September 2026 alongside the L03, as part of the brand's entry to the Philippine market. It is available with two variants: Long Range and Long Range with Second Row Premium Seat Package, both powered using the 110 kWh battery pack.

=== Singapore ===
The X9 debuted for the Singapore market at the 2025 Singapore Motor Show on 9 January 2025, with orders opening later the same month. It is available exclusively with the front-wheel drive powertrain, with the same two battery options achieving 480 and 575 kilometres (298 and 357 mi) on the WLTP cycle. The X9 Pro was launched in Singapore on 14 May 2026, with two variants: Standard Range (94.8 kWh) and Long Range (110 kWh).

=== Thailand ===
The X9 was launched in Thailand on 28 November 2024, in the unnamed sole variant using the 101.5 kWh battery pack. On 22 February 2025, XPeng held a ceremony commemorating the shipment of 300 right-hand drive X9 units to Thailand, the first shipment to international markets for the X9. In March 2025, the unnamed sole variant became the Luxury variant, and the entry-level Premium variant using the 84 kWh battery pack was added. In August 2025, the Premium variant was replaced by the Executive using the larger 101.5 kWh battery pack. In January 2026, the Executive Special Color Edition variant became available.

The facelifted X9 was launched in Thailand on 18 March 2026, as the first right-hand drive market to debut the facelifted model. Fully imported from China, it is available with three variants: Premium FWD, Executive FWD and Luxury Dual Motors AWD.

== Safety ==
=== C-NCAP ===
The X9 achieved a five-star rating in China's C-NCAP safety testing, scoring 86.6% overall. The tested model was the top trim with the larger battery and front-wheel drive powertrain, and was equipped with the optional XNGP urban NOA system featuring two LiDARs and two Nvidia Orin X SoCs. In the subcategories, it scored 86.18% on occupant protection, 69.92% on pedestrian protection, and 97.68% in active safety, which is the second highest score in the category behind the Aito M9.

C-NCAP (2021) test results 2024 XPeng X9 702 Long-range Max
Category		%
Overall:	5 /5 stars	86.6%
Occupant protection:		86.16%
Vulnerable road users:		69.92%
Active safety:		97.68%

=== ANCAP ===
ANCAP test results Xpeng X9 (2026, aligned with Euro NCAP)
Test	Score
Overall:	5 /5 stars
Safe driving	56%
Crash avoidance	82%
Crash protection	91%
Post crash	91%

=== Euro NCAP ===
Euro NCAP test results Xpeng X9 (2026)
Test	Score
Overall:	5 /5 stars
Safe driving	82%
Crash avoidance	57%
Crash protection	91%
Post crash	91%

== Sales ==
On 10 June 2025, XPeng announced that the X9 exceeded 30,000 worldwide deliveries.

Year	China			Thailand	Indonesia	Malaysia (Note: Figures based on registration (Malaysia))
Year	EV	EREV	Total	Thailand	Indonesia	Malaysia
2024	21,608		21,608			
2025	13,730	6,026	19,756	1,251	771	644
