= L60 =

L60 can refer to:

- IFA L60, a 1980s truck built in East Germany
- Stridsvagn L-60, a 1930s light tank built in Sweden
- Suzuki L60, a 1970s two-stroke vehicle engine
- Suzuki L60V, a 1970s model of Suzuki Carry vehicle powered by the L60 engine
- Leyland L60, a 1960s tank engine
- Bofors 40 mm gun (L/60), a Swedish anti-aircraft gun.
- Onvo L60, a battery electric mid-size crossover SUV
