= Onvo L90 =

Battery electric full-size crossover SUVs

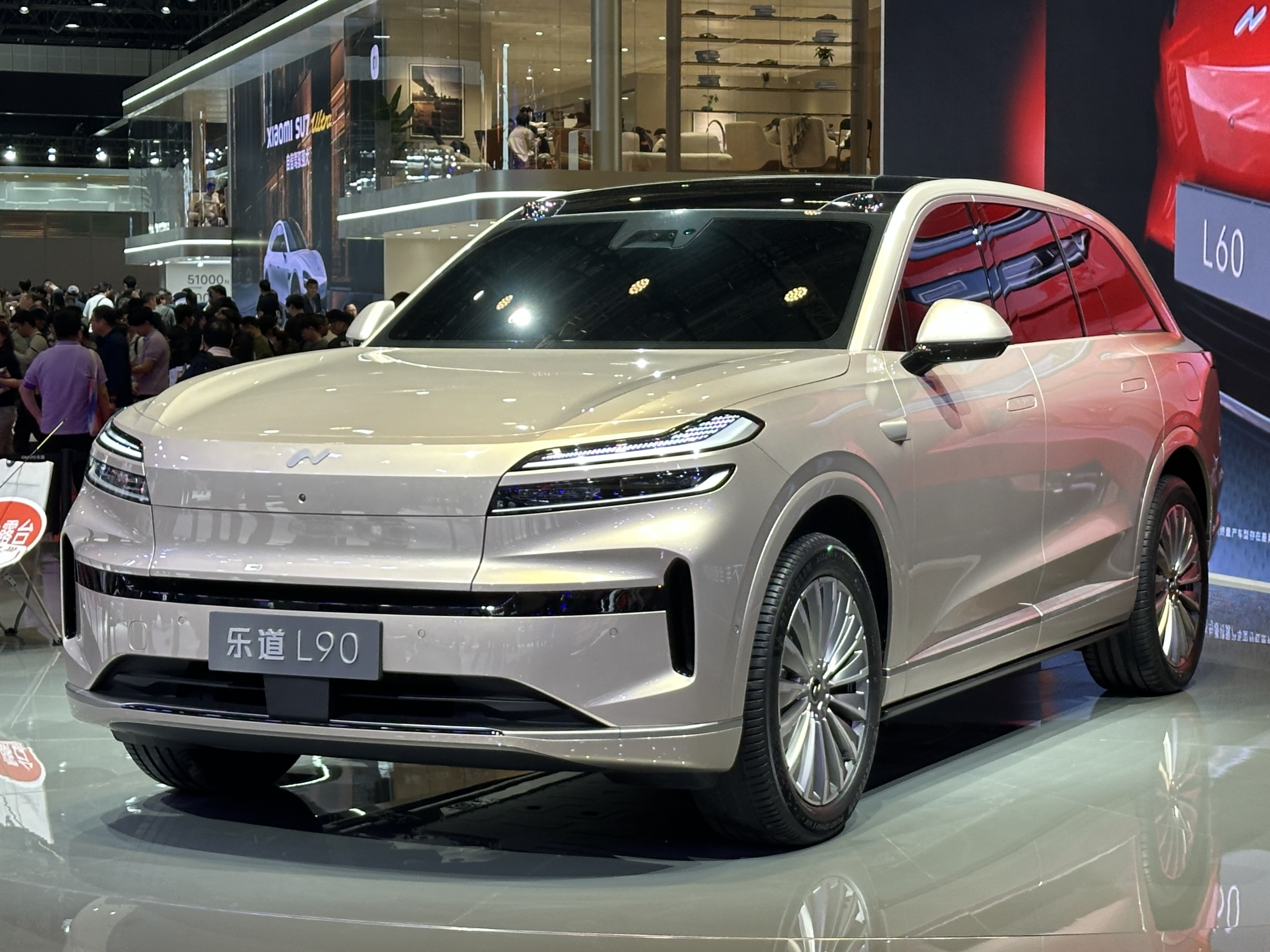

Overview
- Manufacturer: Nio Inc.
- Also called: Onvo L80 (2-row version)
- Production: July 2025 – present
- Assembly: China: Hefei, Anhui
- Designer: Under the lead of Raul Pires

Body and chassis
- Class: Full-size crossover SUV
- Body style: 5-door SUV
- Layout: Rear-motor, rear-wheel-drive; Dual-motor, all-wheel-drive
- Platform: NT 3.0 platform
- Related: Onvo L60; Nio ES8 (third generation)

Powertrain
- Electric motor: Permanent magnet synchronous
- Power output: 456–590 hp (340–440 kW; 462–598 PS)
- Battery: 85.1 kWh NMC CALB
- Electric range: 550–605 km (342–376 mi) (CLTC)

Dimensions
- Wheelbase: 3,110 mm (122 in)
- Length: 5,145 mm (203 in)
- Width: 1,998 mm (79 in)
- Height: 1,676 mm (66 in)
- Curb weight: 2,250–2,385 kg (4,960–5,258 lb)

The Onvo L90 (Chinese: 乐道L90; pinyin: Lèdào L90) and the Onvo L80 (Chinese: 乐道L80; pinyin: Lèdào L80) are battery electric full-size crossover SUVs manufactured by Nio since 2025. They are the second and third vehicles respectively under Nio's Onvo brand, which targets the mass-market instead of Nio's premium segment. Both models are essentially the same, the only difference being the L80 is a 2-row vehicle 5 seats and the L90 is a 3-row which can be had with 6 or 7 seats.

== Overview ==
The Onvo L90 is a large crossover SUV sharing the NT 3.0 platform with the Onvo L60. It was revealed at the 2025 Shanghai Auto Show. Pre-orders for the L90 opened on Jul 10th, 2025. The L90 was launched on July 31st, 2025, with deliveries starting the next day. The 20,000th L90 was delivered on September 29, 2025, only 2 months after the L90's launch.

Onvo announced during the Chengdu Auto Show that deliveries of the L80, the 5-seat version of the L90, were delayed to 2026.

Deliveries of the L80 will begin in May 2026.

The L90 shares its design language with the L60 but adopts a traditional look instead of the fastback look with the L60. The Onvo L90 comes with a 240-litre (8.5 cu ft) frunk that is large enough to hold large luggage, and can be opened by knocking on the lid. It has soft close doors and power retracting running boards.

The L90 is available in 6- or 7-seater 3-row variants. The dashboard features a 17.2-inch 3K central infotainment display, and features a 35-inch AR-HUD instead of an instrument cluster. It has 3-zone climate control and the rear passengers have access to an 8-inch control screen, a 17.3-inch 3K ceiling-mounted entertainment display and a 8.86-litre (0.313 cu ft) 0–50 °C (32–122 °F) temperature controlled compartment. In the 6-seat configuration, every seat has heating, ventilation, and massaging functions. It is available with a 2048-watt 23-speaker 7.1.4 surround sound system and a 1.1 m^{2} (12 sq ft) sunroof. The ceiling and pillars are upholstered in microfiber, and it has two wood accent options. Other features present include a gear shifter behind the steering wheel, two wireless charging pads, and dual cup holders. It has a 430-litre (15.2 cu ft) trunk with a 106-litre (3.7 cu ft) underfloor storage area in addition to a 240-litre (8.5 cu ft) frunk.

The L90 has a continuous damping control and 100 mm (3.9 in) adaptive air suspension system which can prepare for upcoming bumps in the road based on data collected from vehicles that have travelled before. Additionally, it is equipped with four hydraulic bushings at the front and rear suspension.

Both L90 and L80 are equipped with nine airbags. For the 2025 model, It has an ADAS system which utilizes a 4D mmWave radar with 48 channels and a 370 m (1,210 ft) detection range along with seven 4K cameras. In April 2026, revamped L90 was launched with LiDAR option, so does L80.

Onvo claims that the L90 is the lightest full-size 3-row battery-electric SUV, with a kerb weight of 2,250 kilograms (4,960 lb) in its lightest configuration. This is achieved through weight savings such as a 72-in-1 integrated large die-cast aluminium-alloy rear floor which saves 11.7 kg (26 lb) according to Onvo, 900-volt powertrain electrical architecture which reduces wiring harness weight by 50%, a 79 kg (174 lb) rear drive motor, and a 440 kg (970 lb) battery pack with an energy density of 193.2 Wh/kg.

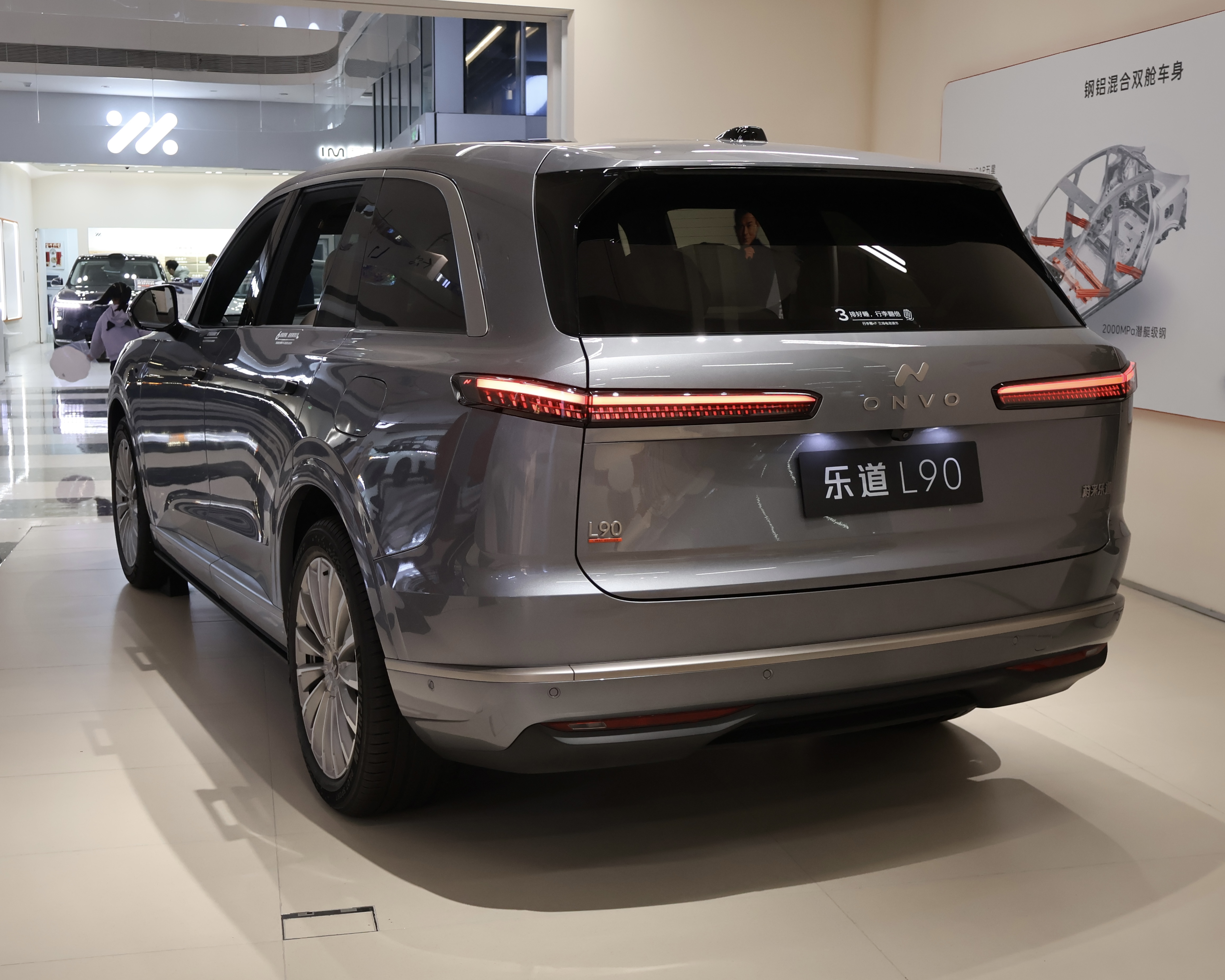
Rear view

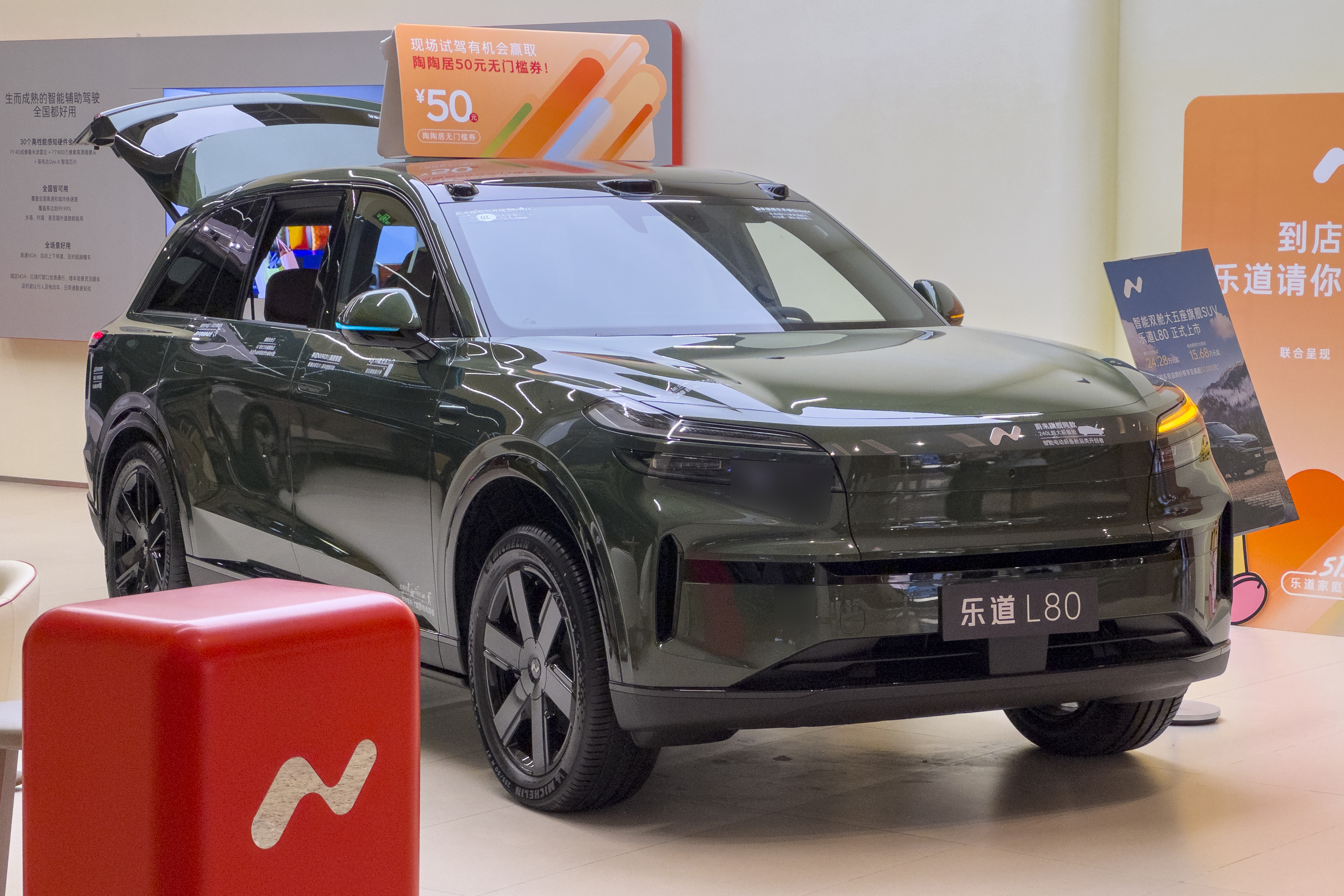
Onvo L80

== Powertrain ==
The L90 is a battery-electric powertrain capable of battery swapping at Nio swap stations and has 900-volt power electronics. Rear-wheel-drive models come equipped with the same 340 kW (456 hp; 462 PS) W-pin rear motor found in the Nio ET9, while all-wheel-drive models add a 100 kW (134 hp; 136 PS) motor to the front for a total of 440 kW (590 hp; 598 PS). The L90 comes with a 116 mm (4.6 in) thick 85.1 kWh NMC battery with CLTC range ratings of up to 605 km (376 mi) with rear-wheel drive and up to 570 km (354 mi) with all-wheel drive. When using the compatible 60.6 kWh LFP pack obtained from a swap station, the all-wheel drive variant has a range between 410–425 km (255–264 mi).

Variant	Battery	Power	Range (CLTC)	0-100
Rear-wheel drive	85.1kWh NMC CALB	340 kW (456 hp; 462 PS)	605 km (376 mi)	5.9s
All-wheel drive	85.1kWh NMC CALB	440 kW (590 hp; 598 PS)	570 km (354 mi)	4.7s
All-wheel drive	60.6kWh LFP	440 kW (590 hp; 598 PS)	425 km (264 mi)	4.7s

== Safety ==
The Onvo L90 achieved the fourth highest score out of all tested under the 2024 revision of the C-NCAP. The L90 scored 6.29% and 4.38% higher than the average in the Vulnerable Road Users and Active Safety categories, respectively.

C-NCAP (2024) test results 2025 Onvo L90 Pro six-seater
Category		%
Overall:	5 /5 stars	91.0%
Occupant protection:		95.98%
Vulnerable road users:		78.64%
Active safety:		92.68%

== Sales ==
Year	China
2025	44,004
