= XPeng Mona L05 =

Electric mid-size crossover SUV

- XPeng Mona L05 MY2027

Overview
- Manufacturer: XPeng
- Model code: D02
- Production: 2026–present
- Assembly: China: Zhaoqing

Body and chassis
- Class: Mid-size crossover SUV
- Body style: 5-door fastback SUV
- Related: XPeng Mona M03; XPeng Mona L03 / L03

Powertrain
- Engine: Petrol range extender: 1.5 L H15R I4
- Electric motor: 183 kW Luxshare TZ200XY01D03X PMSM
- Power output: 246 hp (183 kW; 249 PS)
- Hybrid drivetrain: Series range extender
- Battery: 37.2 kWh LFP Eve Energy; 58.2 kWh LFP CALB; 71.1 kWh LFP CALB
- Electric range: 253 km (157 mi) (EREV, WLTP); 310 km (193 mi) (EREV, CLTC); 535–635 km (332–395 mi) (BEV, CLTC)

Dimensions
- Wheelbase: 2,940 mm (115.7 in)
- Length: 4,870 mm (191.7 in)
- Width: 1,930 mm (76.0 in)
- Height: 1,636 mm (64.4 in)
- Curb weight: 1,988–1,995 kg (4,383–4,398 lb)

The XPeng Mona L05 (Chinese: 小鹏Mona L05; pinyin: Xiǎopéng Mona L05) is a battery electric and range-extended mid-size crossover SUV produced by XPeng.

== Overview ==
The L05 was filed by XPeng in China's MIIT on 9 May 2026, revealing its exterior design and technical specifications. Pre-orders opened on 15 October 2026, and the L05 officially went on sale in China on 29 October 2026, with the first deliveries occurring on 4 November 2026.

The L05 uses a MacPherson strut front and five-link independent rear suspension geometry, and is equipped with continuous damping control as standard. It is equipped with 225/60 R18 tires on 18-inch wheels as standard, which can be upgraded to 245/45 R20 tires on 20-inch wheels.

The interior features a 17.3-inch central infotainment touchscreen with 3K-resolution, 600 nit brightness and 95% DCI-P3 color gamut coverage, and the standard 26.8-inch AR-HUD serves as the instrument panel, all powered by a Mediatek MT8676 SoC. European market models will be equipped with a digital instrument cluster. The center console is a two-tier design featuring a 50-watt active-cooled wireless charging pad, two cupholders and a 9.3-litre (0.33 cu ft) refrigerator-heater compartment in the armrest storage bin. The cabin has 22 accessory mounting points throughout. The rear passengers have access to an optional ceiling-mounted 17.3-inch entertainment display with 98% DCI-P3 color gamut coverage and can tilt 0–105°, airline-style seatback tables, and 10-litre (0.35 cu ft) drawer storage bins located underneath the seat cushion. It is equipped with a standard 9-speaker sound system or an optional 1000-watt 20-speaker 7.1.4 surround sound system with driver's headrest speakers, standard heating, ventilation, massaging, and power lumbar and leg support adjustment functions as standard for the front row seats, 'zero-gravity' recline mode for the front passenger seat, and a panoramic sunroof.

The L05 has 702 litres (24.8 cu ft) of rear cargo space which measures 1,015 mm (40.0 in) wide and deep with a 1,094 mm (43.1 in) wide opening, which expands to 1,913 litres (67.6 cu ft) with the rear seats folded down, and is supplemented by a 102-litre (3.6 cu ft) frunk on electric models.

The L05 is available with three tiers of ADAS systems. The standard Plus system is equipped with 5 cameras and is capable of basic Level 2 ADAS functions such as adaptive cruise control. The Max system uses XPeng's second-generation VLA Lite model and has a sensor suite consisting of 11 cameras and 12 ultrasonic sensors, and is powered by XPeng's self-developed Turing chip providing 750 TOPS, while the upper-tier Ultra SE variant runs the full-fledged VLA model and adds a second Turing chip for a total of 1500 TOPS; both are capable of Level 2 supervised autonomous driving in highway and urban conditions.

== Powertrain ==
The L05 shares its powertrains with the smaller L03, offering both battery electric and extended range electric powertrain options. All variants use a Luxshare-supplied permanent magnet synchronous motor outputting 246 hp (183 kW; 249 PS) and 280 N⋅m (207 lb⋅ft) of torque driving the rear wheels.

Range extender variants are equipped with a 1.5-liter engine supplied by Seres subsidiary Chongqing Xiaokang Power with a net power output of 91 hp (68 kW; 92 PS) at 5,200 rpm and 135 N⋅m (100 lb⋅ft) of torque at 3,400–4,000 rpm. It is equipped with a 37.2 kWh LFP battery pack supplied by Eve Energy which provides 310 kilometres (193 mi) of CLTC electric range and is capable of recharging from 10–80% in 15 minutes.

The battery electric variants are available with a choice of two LFP battery packs both supplied by CALB. The 58.2 kWh pack provides a CLTC range rating of 535 kilometres (332 mi), while the 71.1 kWh pack provides 635 kilometres (395 mi), and both are capable of recharging from 10–80% in 19 minutes.

Specifications
| Battery | | Power | Torque | Electric range | | 10–80% charge | 0–100 km/h (62 mph) | Top speed | Kerb weight |
| Type | Weight | Power | Torque | WLTP | CLTC | 10–80% charge | 0–100 km/h (62 mph) | Top speed | Kerb weight |
|---|---|---|---|---|---|---|---|---|---|
| 37.2 kWh LFP Eve Energy | 289 kg (637 lb) | TZ200XY01D03X PMSM 246 hp (183 kW; 249 PS) | 280 N⋅m (207 lb⋅ft) | 253 km (157 mi) | 310 km (193 mi) | 15 min | 6.8 s | 180 km/h (112 mph) | 1,988 kg (4,383 lb) |
| 58.2 kWh LFP CALB | 428 kg (944 lb) | TZ200XY01D03X PMSM 246 hp (183 kW; 249 PS) | 280 N⋅m (207 lb⋅ft) | — | 535 km (332 mi) | 19 min | 7.3 s | 180 km/h (112 mph) | 1,930 kg (4,250 lb) |
| 71.1 kWh LFP CALB | 494 kg (1,089 lb) | TZ200XY01D03X PMSM 246 hp (183 kW; 249 PS) | 280 N⋅m (207 lb⋅ft) | — | 635 km (395 mi) | 19 min | 6.8 s | 180 km/h (112 mph) | 1,995 kg (4,398 lb) |

== Sales ==
Soon after the L05 went on sale on 29 October 2026 5,000 units of pre-manufactured inventory sold out.
