= XPeng G6 =

Battery electric mid-size crossover SUV

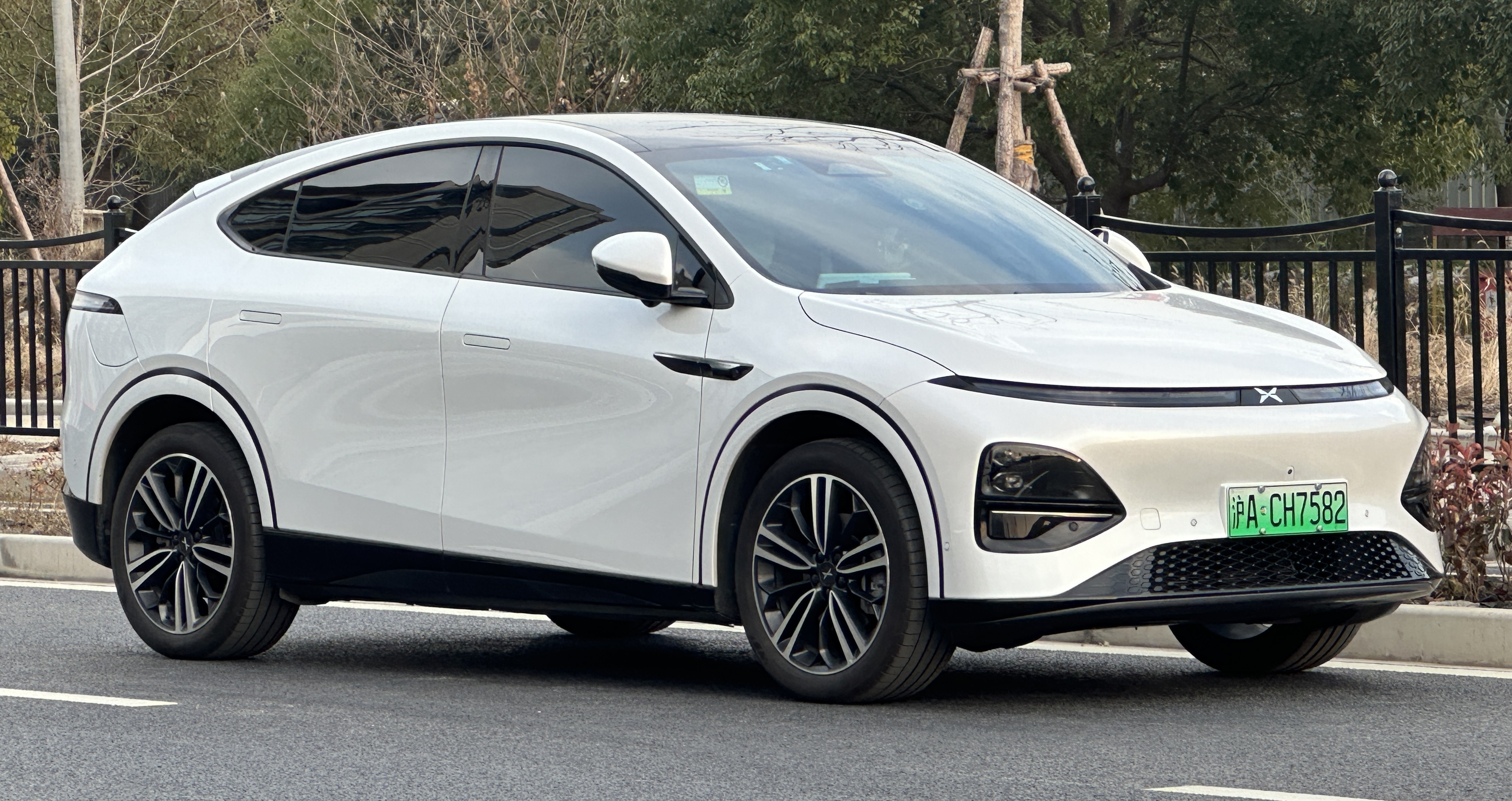

Overview
- Manufacturer: XPeng
- Model code: F30
- Production: June 2023 – present
- Assembly: China: Guangzhou, Guangdong; Indonesia: Purwakarta, West Java (HIM); Malaysia: Malacca (EPMB); Austria: Graz (Magna Steyr)
- Designer: Emanuel Derta

Body and chassis
- Class: Mid-size crossover SUV
- Body style: 5-door coupe SUV
- Layout: Rear-motor, rear-wheel drive; Dual-motor, all-wheel-drive
- Platform: Smart Electric Platform Architecture (SEPA) 2.0

Powertrain
- Electric motor: Permanent magnet synchronous
- Power output: 190–358 kW (255–480 hp; 258–487 PS)
- Battery: 66 kWh CALB LFP; 68.5 kWh CALB LFP; 80.8 kWh CALB LFP; 80.8 kWh CALB NMC; 87.5 kWh CALB NMC
- Electric range: 435–570 km (270–354 mi) (WLTP) 580–755 km (360–469 mi) (CLTC)
- Plug-in charging: AC: 11 kW; DC: 215–451 kW

Dimensions
- Wheelbase: 2,890 mm (113.8 in)
- Length: 4,753 mm (187.1 in)
- Width: 1,920 mm (75.6 in)
- Height: 1,650 mm (65.0 in)
- Kerb weight: 1,995–2,116 kg (4,398–4,665 lb)

The XPeng G6 (Chinese: 小鹏G6; pinyin: Xiǎopéng G6) is a battery electric mid-size crossover SUV manufactured by Chinese electric car company XPeng. The G6 was unveiled in April 2023 during Auto Shanghai and it was launched in China in June.

== History ==
On 18 April 2023, at Auto Shanghai, the world premiere of the fifth model in the portfolio of XPeng took place. The G6 is positioned between the compact G3i and the flagship G9 as a mid-size crossover.

The G6 features a minimalist design characteristic of the company's other products, highlighted by a sleek silhouette and coupe SUV proportions. Its front end is distinguished by double-row headlights, formed by two closely spaced LED strips. The Performance edition includes an opening spoiler at the lower edge of the body, which, combined with the vehicle's aerodynamic shape, is designed to optimize airflow, allowing for a drag coefficient as low as 0.248 C_{d}. The G6's design was developed in collaboration with renowned Chinese science fiction writer Liu Cixin.

The interior features a 10.2-inch digital instrument cluster integrated into the dashboard and a 14.96-inch standing infotainment touchscreen both powered by a Qualcomm Snapdragon 8155P and has integrated HVAC controls, allowing for a nearly buttonless dashboard. The centre console features dual 50-watt cooled wireless charging pads and two circular cupholders ahead of an armrest. The trunk has a capacity of 571 litres (20.2 cu ft), expanding to 1,374 litres (48.5 cu ft) with the rear seats folded down.

During the premiere, XPeng claimed that the G6 features fast-charging capabilities allowing users to add up to 300 kilometres (190 mi) of range in 10 minutes, made possible by the new generation modular Smart Electric Platform Architecture (SEPA) 2.0 platform. It uses a 800-volt electrical architecture and utilizes silicon carbide (SiC) semiconductors in its power electronics.

The G6 is available with XPeng's XNGP ADAS system, which has a 31-sensor suite including 2 LiDARs, 5 mmWave radars, 11 cameras, and 12 ultrasonic sensors, powered by dual Nvidia Orin X SoCs.

The G6 was developed for sale in global markets. Deliveries of the first units began on 29 June 2023 in China, with selected Western European markets to follow in 2024.

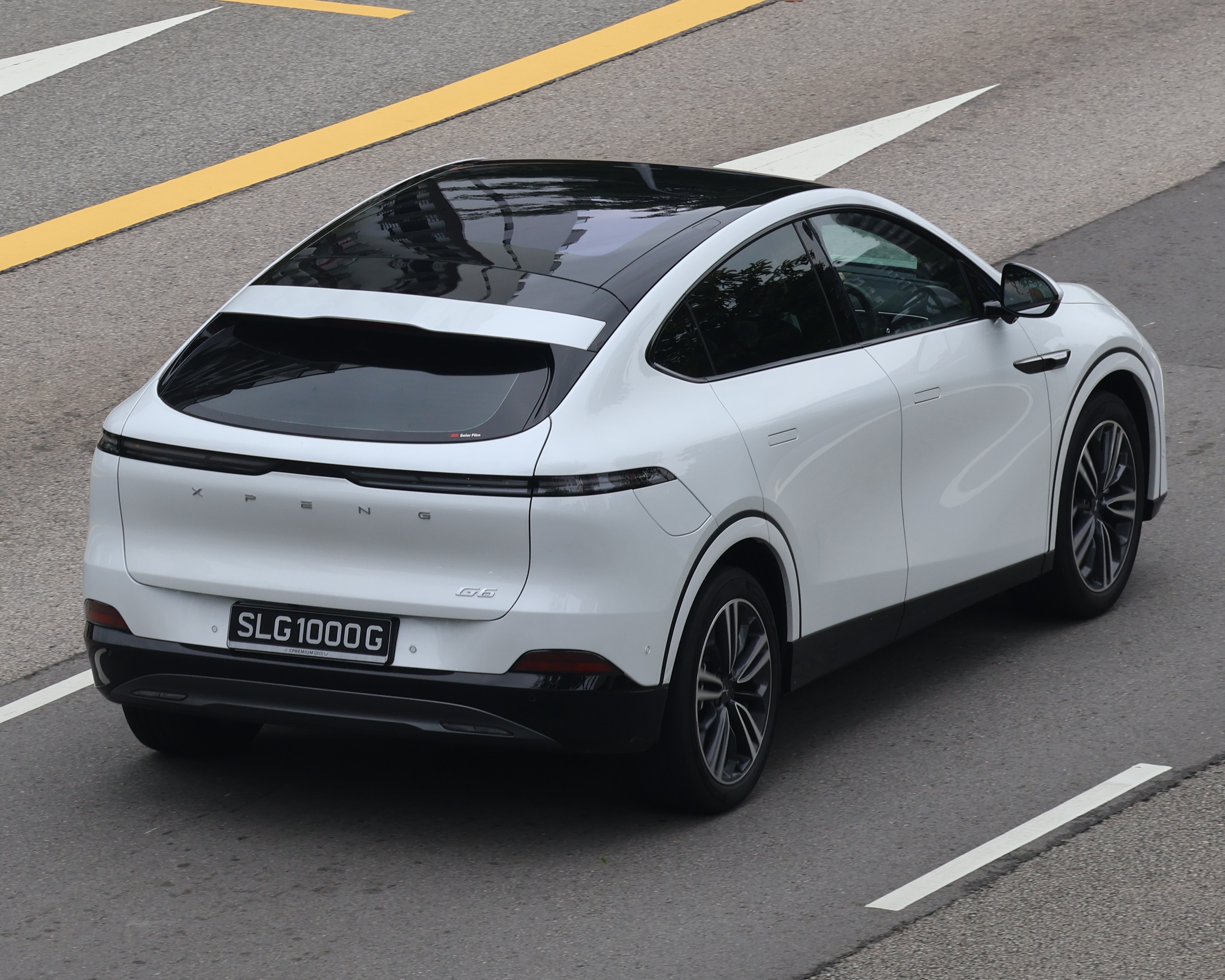
Rear view

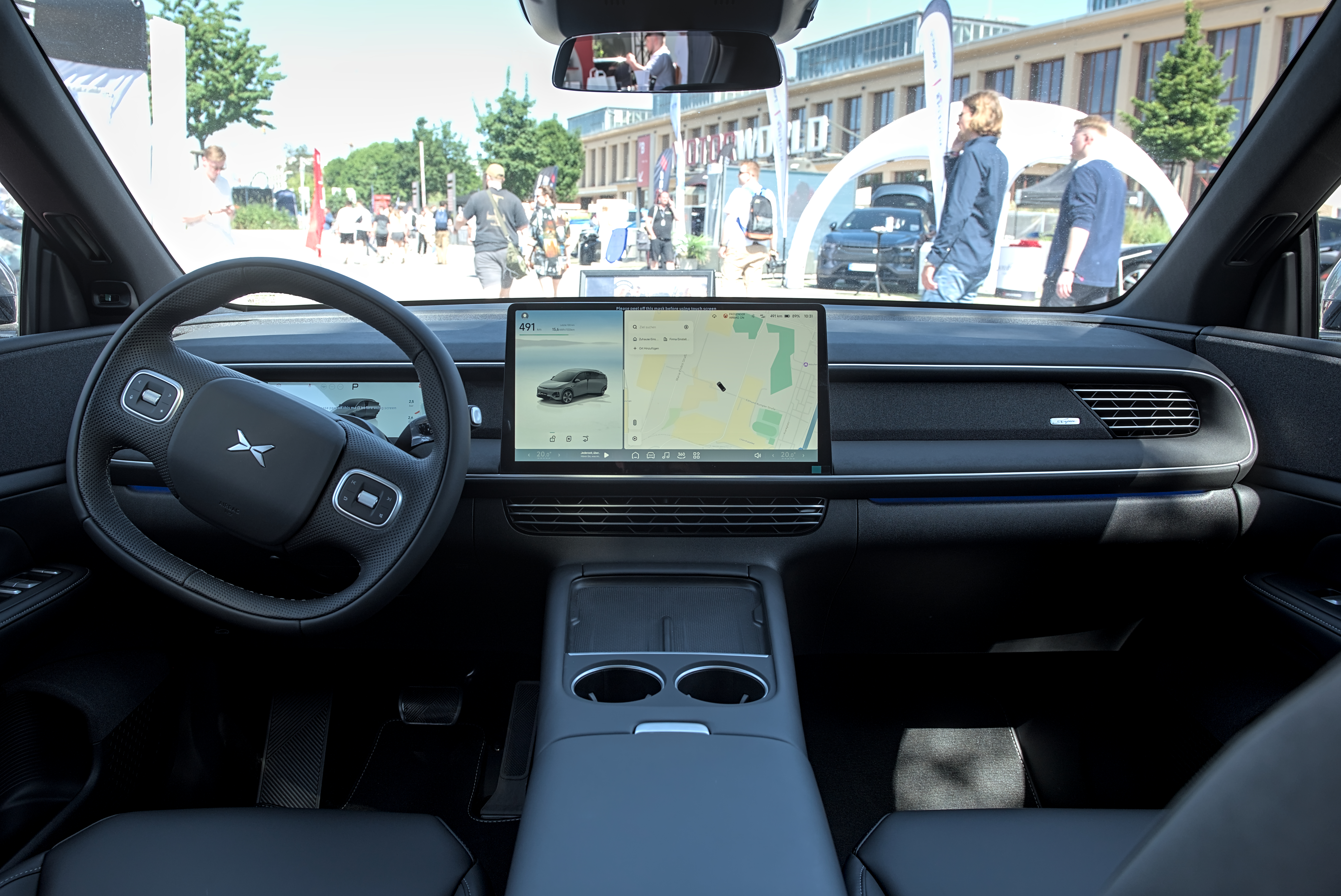
Interior

=== 2025 refresh (F30b) ===
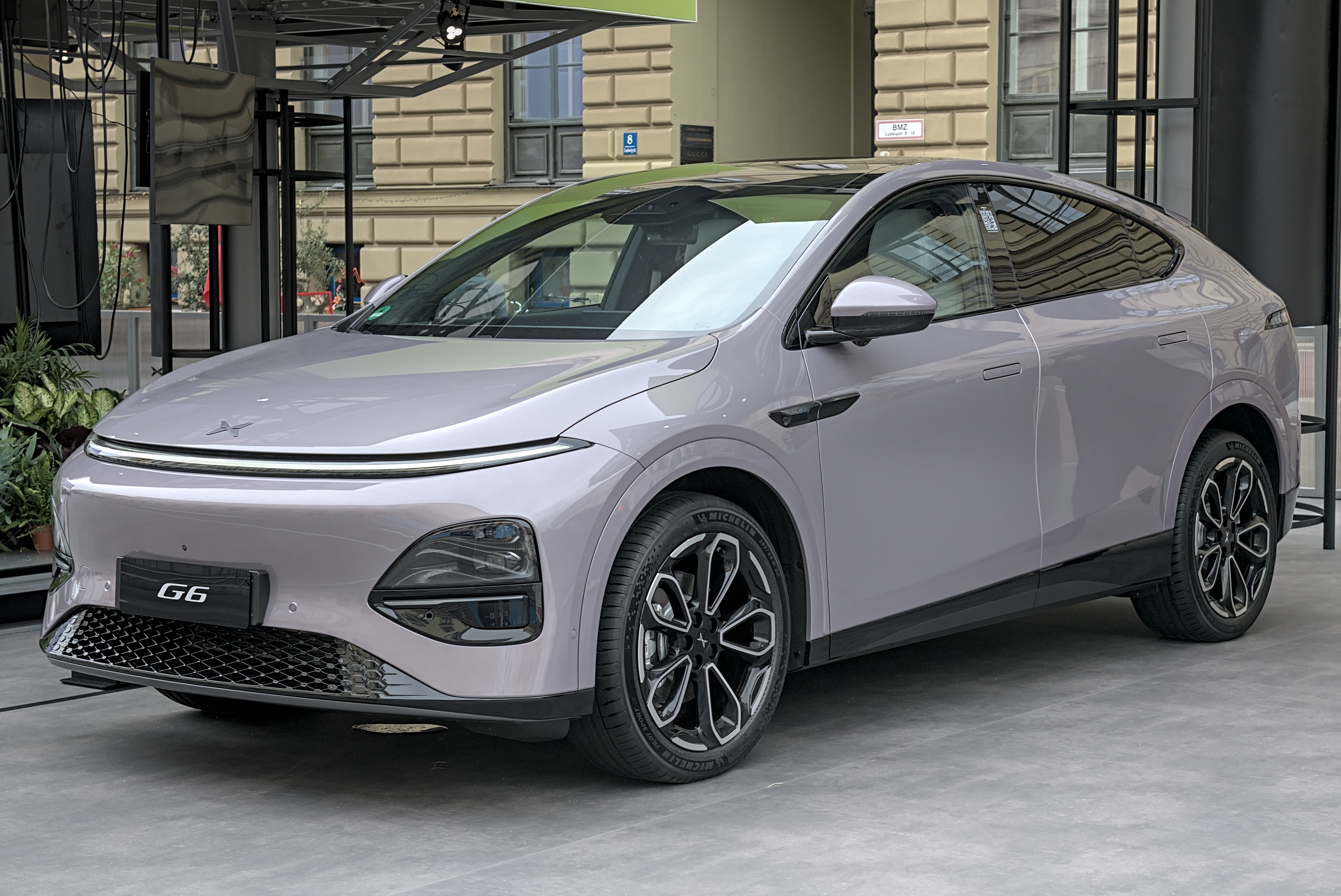

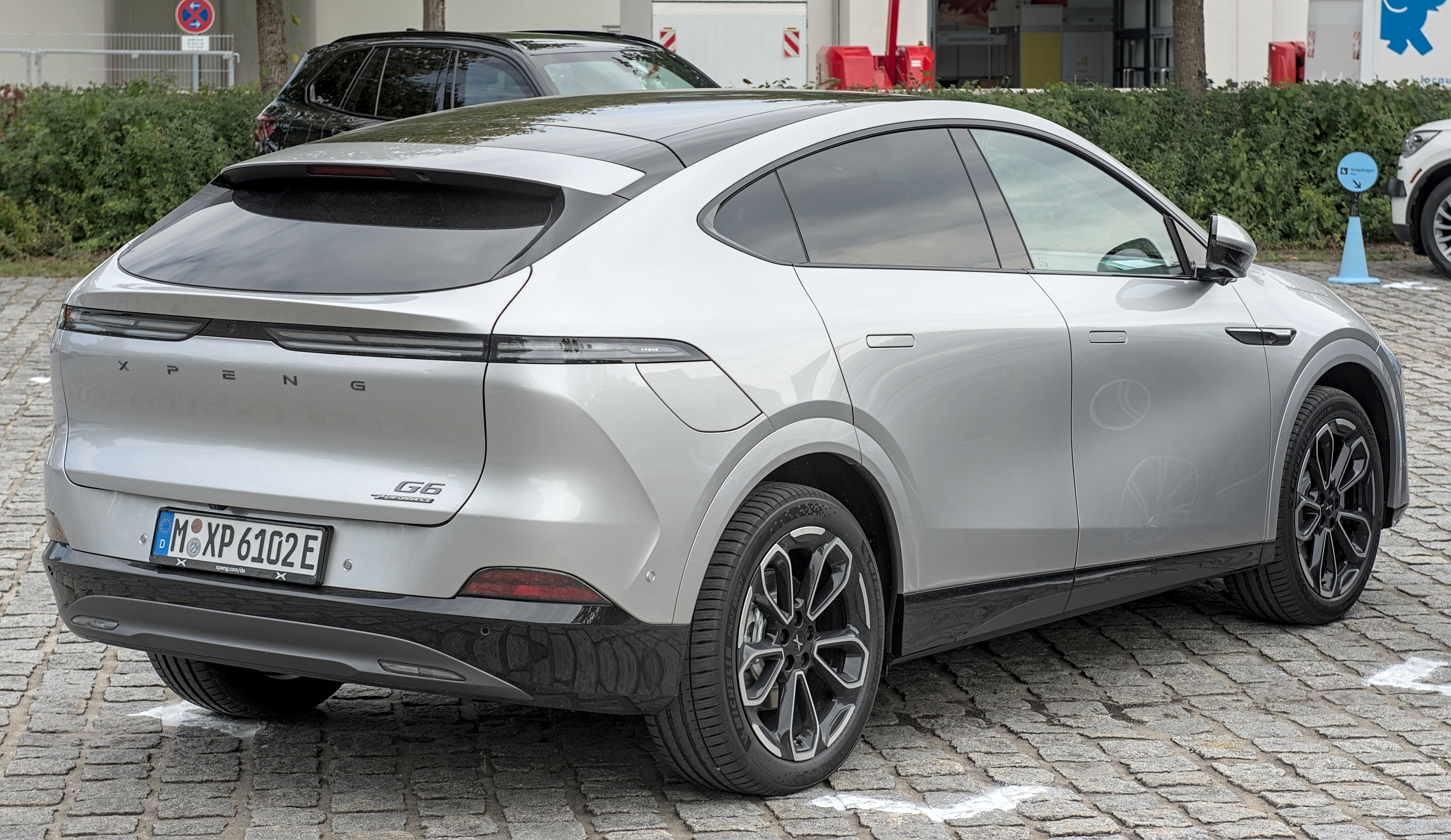
2025 XPeng G6

The 2025 model year G6 was launched in China in March 2025, featuring a total of 81 changes. In China, the previously optional assisted autonomous driving system is now standard on all models.

It features updated styling, including a full-width front light bar, new wheel designs, a fixed ducktail spoiler for improved rear visibility, darker taillights, and a revised plastic fender trim. It also gains a revised dashboard design, with a standing 10.25-inch instrument cluster and a larger 15.6-inch infotainment display powered by a Qualcomm Snapdragon 8295P SoC, along with upgraded materials throughout the cabin. It also has a 9-inch digital centre rear view mirror along with heating, ventilation, and massaging functions for the front row seats. The trunk has a capacity of 647 litres (22.8 cu ft), expanding to 1,752 litres (61.9 cu ft) with the rear seats folded down, and the centre armrest storage area has a volume of 8.9 litres (0.31 cu ft), which XPeng claims are all best-in-class capacities.

The model features an updated intelligent driving system called Turing AI which became standard on all models in China. It was first seen in the P7+, which notably lacks LiDAR in its sensor suite and relies only on mmWave radars and cameras, and is powered by two Nvidia Drive Orin SoCs. It is capable of assisted autonomous driving on all public roads, and like the P7+ the vehicle has turquoise LED lights placed on the exterior to notify other road users while the system is enabled.

The vehicle features new batteries capable of 5C charging, allowing it to charge from 10-80% in 12 minutes. According to XPeng, the battery packs' sides can withstand 80 tons of pressure in a collision, the bottom can withstand a 2,000 joule impact, and the top can withstand 1,000 °C (1,800 °F) temperatures.

Other changes include a softer suspension with lengthened travel, retuned steering, and improved soundproofing materials including the addition of double-glazed windows.

=== 2026 update (F30bES) ===
On 8 January 2026, the G6 received an update. The exterior is now available in Astral Grey paint, and the interior has a new Serene Blue color option and an active road noise cancellation feature. The infotainment system now runs on a Mediatek MT8676 SoC which has 16 GB of RAM and 128 GB of storage like the previously used Snapdragon 8295P SoC, and has been updated to use the latest Tianji AIOS 6.0 software. All models now use XPeng's in-house 750 TOPS Turing chip for ADAS, with the option to add a second Turing chip for 1,500 TOPS to enable access to the new second-generation VLA driving model that enables AEB at up to 130 km/h (81 mph) and claimed future L4 autonomous driving capability, and a third Turing chip to run an advanced VLM onboard LLM AI model for cabin voice commands for a total of 2,250 TOPS. The larger 80.8 kWh battery pack option was discontinued in China.

== Powertrain ==
The G6 is available with two powertrain variants. The basic version is equipped with one rear electric motor producing 218 kW (292 hp; 296 PS), while the top-of-the-line model adds an additional 140 kW (188 hp; 190 PS) front motor for a total of 358 kW (480 hp; 487 PS). The basic battery is a LFP pack with a capacity of 66 kWh, while long range models uses a 87.5 kWh NMC battery, both produced by CALB. The batteries are capable of 3C charging, allowing for a 10-80% charge time of 20 minutes.

Since 2025, the updated G6 is equipped with either a 68.5 kWh LFP or a 80.8 kWh NMC battery, both again supplied by CALB. Both packs are capable 5C DC fast charging, with peak rates of 382 kW and 451 kW for the smaller and larger packs, respectively. This allows both packs to charge from 10-80% in 12 minutes, or within 15.5 minutes in −30 °C (−22 °F) ambient conditions. At launch, only the rear-wheel drive configuration is offered, with the motor maintaining power and receiving a slight torque bump up to 450 N⋅m (332 lb⋅ft).

Model	Calendar year	Battery	Motor	Power	Torque	0–100 km/h (62 mph)	Range			10-80% DCFC time	Weight
Model	Calendar year	Battery	Motor	Power	Torque	0–100 km/h (62 mph)	CLTC	NEDC	WLTP	10-80% DCFC time	Weight
Standard Range (global)	2024–present	66 kWh CALB LFP	Rear	190 kW (255 hp; 258 PS)	440 N⋅m (325 lb⋅ft)	6.6 sec	—	505 km (314 mi)	435 km (270 mi)	20 min	2,025 kg (4,464 lb)
Long Range (global)	2024–present	87.5 kWh CALB NMC	Rear	210 kW (282 hp; 286 PS)	440 N⋅m (325 lb⋅ft)	6.2 sec	—	625 km (388 mi)	570 km (354 mi)	20 min	2,025 kg (4,464 lb)
Long Range (China)	2023–2025	66 kWh CALB LFP	Rear	218 kW (292 hp; 296 PS)	440 N⋅m (325 lb⋅ft)	6.6 sec	580 km (360 mi)	—	—	20 min	1,995 kg (4,398 lb)
Ultra Long Range (China)	2023–2025	87.5 kWh CALB NMC	Rear	218 kW (292 hp; 296 PS)	440 N⋅m (325 lb⋅ft)	5.9 sec	755 km (469 mi)	—	—	20 min	1,995 kg (4,398 lb)
AWD Max Performance	2023–present	87.5 kWh CALB NMC	Rear	218 kW (292 hp; 296 PS)	440 N⋅m (325 lb⋅ft)	3.9 sec	700 km (435 mi)	575 km (357 mi)	550 km (342 mi)	20 min	2,095 kg (4,619 lb)
AWD Max Performance	2023–present	87.5 kWh CALB NMC	Front	140 kW (188 hp; 190 PS)	220 N⋅m (162 lb⋅ft)	3.9 sec	700 km (435 mi)	575 km (357 mi)	550 km (342 mi)	20 min	2,095 kg (4,619 lb)
AWD Max Performance	2023–present	87.5 kWh CALB NMC	Combined:	358 kW (480 hp; 487 PS)	660 N⋅m (487 lb⋅ft)	3.9 sec	700 km (435 mi)	575 km (357 mi)	550 km (342 mi)	20 min	2,095 kg (4,619 lb)
2025 refresh
Long Range (China)	2025–present	68.5 kWh CALB LFP	Rear	218 kW (292 hp; 296 PS)	450 N⋅m (332 lb⋅ft)	6.4 sec	625 km (388 mi)	—	—	12 min	2,030 kg (4,475 lb)
Ultra Long Range (China)	2025	80.8 kWh CALB NMC	Rear	218 kW (292 hp; 296 PS)	450 N⋅m (332 lb⋅ft)	6.3 sec	725 km (450 mi)	—	—	12 min	2,116 kg (4,665 lb)
Standard Range (Export)	2025–present	68.5 kWh CALB LFP	Rear	187 kW (251 hp; 254 PS)	440 N⋅m (325 lb⋅ft)	6.94 sec	—	540 km (336 mi)	435 km (270 mi)	12 min	2,065 kg (4,553 lb)
Long Range (export)	2025–present	80.8 kWh CALB LFP	Rear	218 kW (292 hp; 296 PS)	450 N⋅m (332 lb⋅ft)	6.7 sec	—	625 km (388 mi)	525 km (326 mi)	12 min	2,115 kg (4,663 lb)
AWD Performance (export)	2025–present	80.8 kWh CALB LFP	Rear	218 kW (292 hp; 296 PS)	450 N⋅m (332 lb⋅ft)	4.13 sec	—	575 km (357 mi)	510 km (317 mi)	12 min	2,220 kg (4,890 lb)
AWD Performance (export)	2025–present	80.8 kWh CALB LFP	Front	140 kW (188 hp; 190 PS)	220 N⋅m (162 lb⋅ft)	4.13 sec	—	575 km (357 mi)	510 km (317 mi)	12 min	2,220 kg (4,890 lb)
AWD Performance (export)	2025–present	80.8 kWh CALB LFP	Combined:	358 kW (480 hp; 487 PS)	660 N⋅m (487 lb⋅ft)	4.13 sec	—	575 km (357 mi)	510 km (317 mi)	12 min	2,220 kg (4,890 lb)

== Markets ==
=== Australia ===
The G6 was launched in Australia on 30 September 2024 as XPeng's first model available in the country, with deliveries starting in October 2024. It comes in two rear-wheel-drive variants: Standard Range and Long Range.

=== Brunei ===
The G6 was launched in Brunei on 6 November 2026 alongside with the L03 and X9, as part of the brand's entry to the Bruneian market. It is offered in a single variant: Standard Range in two rear-wheel-drive.

=== Europe ===
The G6 was launched in Europe in June 2025, alongside the XPeng G9, marking XPeng's entry into the European market, with order books opening in July 2025. In Europe, the vehicle is offered in Standard Range and Long Range rear-wheel drive models, with the all-wheel drive Performance model becoming available at a later date.

=== Hong Kong ===
On 17 May 2024, the G6 made its official debut in Hong Kong alongside the XPeng X9. It has support for Cantonese voice recognition, and deliveries commenced in mid-2024. It is available with two rear-wheel drive variants: 580 Pro Standard Range and 755 Pro Long Range.

=== Indonesia ===
The G6 Pro was launched in Indonesia on 23 July 2025 at the 32nd Gaikindo Indonesia International Auto Show, alongside the XPeng X9. Assembled locally in Indonesia, the vehicle is offered in two variants: RWD Long Range and AWD Performance. An all-wheel drive performance variant, the G6 AWD Performance, was launched in Indonesia on 28 June 2026. Imported from China, it introduces a dual-motor configuration and is available with an exclusive Black Edition styling package.

=== Malaysia ===
The G6 was launched in Malaysia on 27 August 2024, as the first XPeng model sold in Malaysia. It is available with two variants: 580 Pro and 755 Pro. The G6 facelift was launched in Malaysia on 1 October 2025, with three variants: RWD Long Range Pro, AWD Performance and AWD Black Edition. Local CKD assembly is expected to commence on 31 March 2026 at contract manufacturer EPMB's assembly plant in Malacca.

=== Singapore ===
The G6 was launched in Singapore on 25 July 2024, following the opening of first XPeng showroom in Singapore in November 2024. It is available with two rear-wheel drive variants: Standard Range and Long Range. The G6 facelift was launched in Singapore on 29 September 2025, with two variants: Single Motor RWD Long Range and Dual Motor AWD Performance.

=== Thailand ===
The G6 was launched in Thailand on 21 August 2024, as the first XPeng model sold in Thailand. It is available with two rear-wheel drive variants: Standard Range and Long Range. The 2025 model year G6 update was launched in Thailand on 21 August 2025, with two variants: Long Range and Performance AWD. In November 2025, the Standard Range variant was added to the line-up as the entry-level variant for the 2025 model year G6.

== Safety ==
Euro NCAP test results XPeng G6 Long Range (LHD) (2024)
Test	Points	%
Overall:	5 /5 stars	
Adult occupant:	35.5	88%
Child occupant:	42	85%
Pedestrian:	51.5	75%
Safety assist:	13.6	75%

ANCAP test results XPeng G6 (2024, aligned with Euro NCAP)
Test	Points	%
Overall:	5 /5 stars	
Adult occupant:	35.49	88%
Child occupant:	42.62	86%
Pedestrian:	51.50	81%
Safety assist:	14.49	80%

== Sales ==
Year	China	Thailand	Indonesia	Malaysia (Note: Figures based on registration (Malaysia))	Total production
2023	44,545				44,545
2024	42,805	178		396	57,093
2025	47,425	1,535	123	892	

After the 2025 update for the G6 was announced on 13 March 2025, XPeng received over 5,000 non-refundable orders for the model within seven minutes of availability.
