= Onvo L60 =

Battery electric mid-size crossover SUV

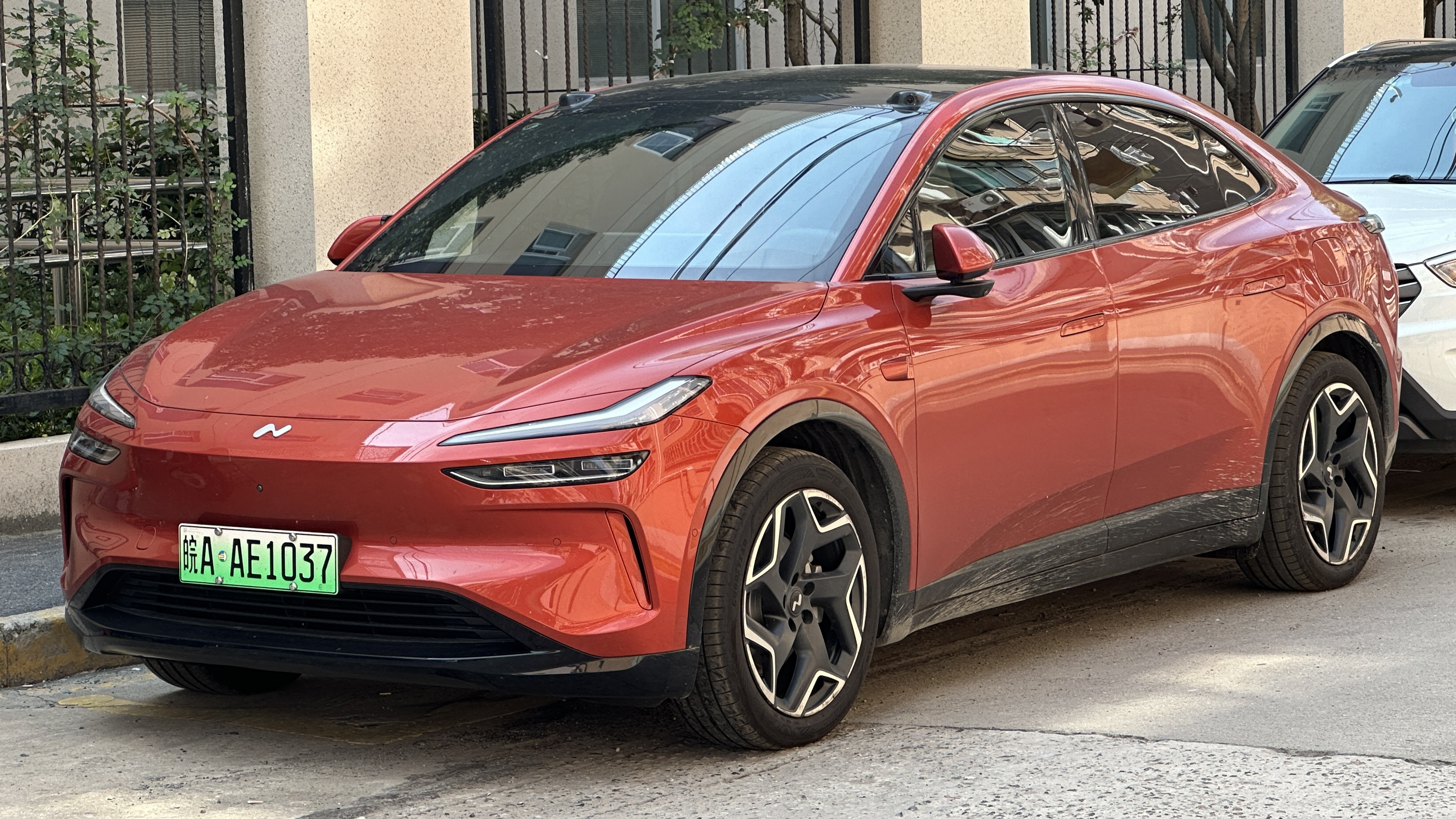

Overview
- Manufacturer: Nio Inc.
- Model code: DOM
- Production: August 2024 – present
- Assembly: China: Hefei, Anhui
- Designer: Under the lead of Raul Pires

Body and chassis
- Class: Mid-size crossover SUV
- Body style: 5-door coupe SUV
- Layout: Rear-motor, rear-wheel-drive; Dual-motor, all-wheel-drive
- Platform: NT 3.0 platform
- Related: Onvo L90; Nio ES8 (third generation)

Powertrain
- Electric motor: Permanent magnet synchronous
- Power output: 240 kW (322 hp; 326 PS)
- Battery: 60.6 kWh FinDreams LFP; 85 kWh CALB NMC lithium-ion
- Range: 555–730 km (345–454 mi) (CLTC)

Dimensions
- Wheelbase: 2,950 mm (116.1 in)
- Length: 4,828 mm (190.1 in)
- Width: 1,920 mm (75.6 in)
- Height: 1,616 mm (63.6 in)
- Kerb weight: 1,885–1,955 kg (4,156–4,310 lb)

The Onvo L60 (Chinese: 乐道L60; pinyin: Lèdào L60) is a battery electric mid-size crossover SUV manufactured by Nio Inc. since 2024. It is the first vehicle of its Onvo brand, which targets the mass-market instead of Nio's premium segment. The model benchmarked the Tesla Model Y, and occupies the Chinese B-class SUV category (D-segment globally).

== History ==
The Onvo L60 went on sale on 19 September 2024 in China, following its debut introduction on 15 May. The first L60 rolled off the production line in mid-August 2024 at Nio's F2 plant in NeoPark in Hefei, Anhui.

== Design and equipment ==
The design of the Onvo L60 was led by former Bentley designer Raul Pires. The L60's exterior design shares some similarities with the Tesla Model Y, its main benchmark and competitor, while featuring a low drag coefficient of Cd 0.229 that is slightly superior than the Model Y's Cd 0.236.

The cabin of the L60 adopts a minimalist approach similar to Tesla, with a single 3K infotainment screen mounted horizontally in the front with a 16:10 aspect ratio and a screen-to-body ratio of 91.5%. The vehicle's cockpit is powered by a Qualcomm Snapdragon 8295P chipset, providing 60 TOPS (tera operations per second) of AI computing power, with 256 GB of internal storage. The audio system consists of an 18-speaker 1020W setup featuring Dolby Atmos, along with a built-in karaoke function.

The L60 is equipped with a 13-inch head-up display. The center console features two sloped wireless charging pads for mobile devices. Unlike Nio's other models, the drive selector is mounted on the steering column, similar to Tesla's design. The rear cabin came equipped with an 8-inch screen mounted on the back of the center console for entertainment. The L60 has an option to include a 52-liter Midea refrigerator under the boot floor.

Unlike Nio's latest models, the Onvo L60 does not incorporate Lidar for its advanced driver-assistance system, although it does feature several sensors around the vehicle, including multiple 8-megapixel HD cameras above the windshield and on the front wings, and a 4-dimension imaging millimeter-wave radar. These sensors are used by Onvo's Smart Driving system (OSD), which uses a vision-based approach. The driving system is powered by an Nvidia Orin X chip with 254 trillions of operations per second (TOPS) of computing power. The vehicle also supports autonomous parking. The L60's autonomous emergency braking (AEB) system operates at speeds of up to 120 km/h (75 mph).

The L60 is compatible with Nio's fourth-generation battery swap stations, as well as third-generation stations with modifications. At launch, approximately 1,000 stations will support the L60, with plans for 2,500 stations by the end of 2025. As a result, buyers can opt for battery as a service (BaaS), which offers a significantly lower price point but with a monthly rental fee depending on the battery pack size.

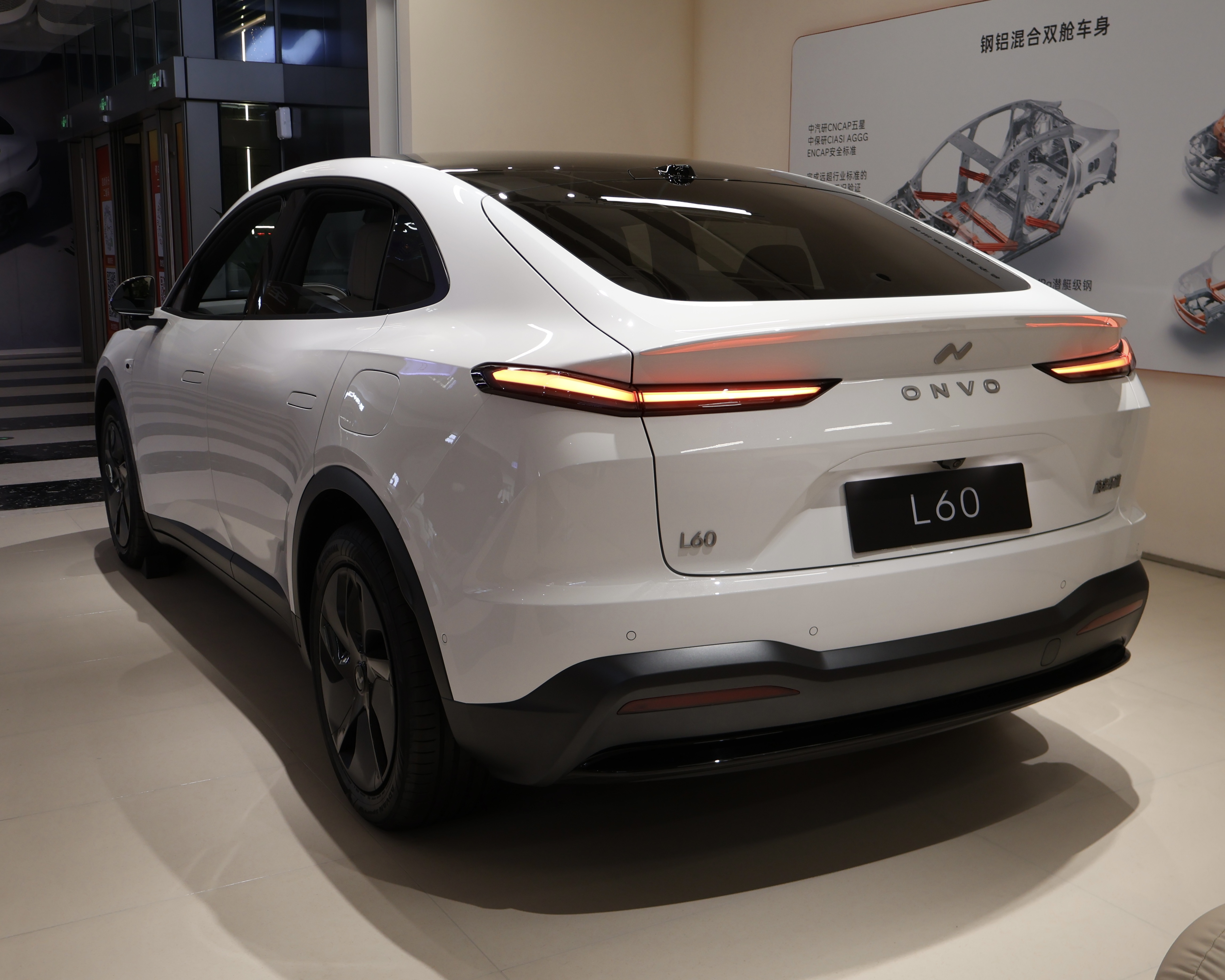
Rear view

== 2025 refresh ==
The 2025 version of the L60 was officially launched on 19 September 2025. Exterior design changes bring it closer to the larger L90, including a new "Dawn Gold" exterior color which comes with silver window trim, and a new 20-inch silver wheel option. Two interior upholstery options - Moon Brown or Cloud Rice Nappa leather is available, with a matching leather steering wheel, premium marble-like trim, and a new folding table for the right rear passenger.

According to Onvo, energy efficiency will be increased once the Coconut 2.0.5 software update rolls out in late September 2025, the CLTC energy efficiency will be improved to 11.9 kWh per 100 km.

Additionally, new standard equipment include ventilated rear seats, hidden ETC integration, and blue-light filtering for all cabin screens. The L60's AI capabilities have been furtherenhanced with spatial question-answering features and improved rear-wheel drive assistance on slippery surfaces.

== 2026 refresh ==
The 2026 L60 made its debut and began pre-sale on 29 May 2026, on the first day of the 2026 Guangdong-Hong Kong-Macao Greater Bay Area International Auto Show. It was scheduled to launch on 11 June.

== Powertrain ==
The L60 is offered with four trims, two of which are powered by a 60.6 kWh battery providing a range of 555 km (345 mi) under CLTC standards for the single-motor version and 525 km (326 mi) for the dual-motor version. This battery pack is supplied by FinDreams Battery, BYD's battery subsidiary. A larger 85 kWh battery pack built by CALB is available, with a CLTC range of 730 km (454 mi) for the single-motor model and 700 km (435 mi) for the dual-motor variant. A 1000+ km (620+ mi) range version will be available in the future. The electrical architecture of the L60 supports 900 V, as opposed to the more common 400 V.

All versions of the L60 are powered by a 240 kW (322 hp; 326 PS) electric motor on the rear axle, generating 305 N⋅m (31.1 kg⋅m; 225 lb⋅ft) of torque. The vehicle has a top speed of 200 km/h (124 mph) and accelerates from 0–100 km/h (0–62 mph) in 5.9 seconds. The dual-motor version adds a 100 kW (134 hp; 136 PS) motor to the front axle, with a maximum speed of 203 km/h (126 mph) and a 0–100 km/h (0–62 mph) acceleration time of 4.6 seconds. The L60's energy efficiency is claimed to be as low as 12.1 kWh/100 km for the single-motor version and 12.7 kWh/100 km for the dual-motor version.

Type	Battery	Layout	Electric motor	Power	Torque	0–100 km/h (0–62 mph)	Range (claimed)	10-80% charge time	Calendar years
Type	Battery	Layout	Electric motor	Power	Torque	0–100 km/h (0–62 mph)	CLTC	10-80% charge time	Calendar years
60 kWh RWD	60.6 kWh FinDreams LFP	RWD	Rear	240 kW (322 hp; 326 PS)	305 N⋅m (225 lb⋅ft)	5.9 seconds	555 km (345 mi)	25 mins	2024–present
60 kWh AWD	60.6 kWh FinDreams LFP	AWD	Rear	240 kW (322 hp; 326 PS)	305 N⋅m (225 lb⋅ft)	4.6 seconds	525 km (326 mi)	25 mins	2024–present
60 kWh AWD	60.6 kWh FinDreams LFP	AWD	Front	100 kW (134 hp; 136 PS)	135 N⋅m (99.6 lb⋅ft)	4.6 seconds	525 km (326 mi)	25 mins	2024–present
60 kWh AWD	60.6 kWh FinDreams LFP	AWD	Combined	340 kW (456 hp; 462 PS)	440 N⋅m (325 lb⋅ft)	4.6 seconds	525 km (326 mi)	25 mins	2024–present
85 kWh RWD	85 kWh CALB NMC	RWD	Rear	240 kW (322 hp; 326 PS)	305 N⋅m (225 lb⋅ft)	5.9 seconds	730 km (454 mi)	20 mins	2024–present
85 kWh AWD	85 kWh CALB NMC	AWD	Rear	240 kW (322 hp; 326 PS)	305 N⋅m (225 lb⋅ft)	4.6 seconds	700 km (435 mi)	20 mins	2024–present
85 kWh AWD	85 kWh CALB NMC	AWD	Front	100 kW (134 hp; 136 PS)	135 N⋅m (99.6 lb⋅ft)	4.6 seconds	700 km (435 mi)	20 mins	2024–present
85 kWh AWD	85 kWh CALB NMC	AWD	Combined	340 kW (456 hp; 462 PS)	440 N⋅m (325 lb⋅ft)	4.6 seconds	700 km (435 mi)	20 mins	2024–present

== Safety ==
C-NCAP (2024) test results 2024 Onvo L60 60 kWh RWD
Category		%
Overall:	5 /5 stars	89.2%
Occupant protection:		94.03%
Vulnerable road users:		77.89%
Active safety:		90.29%

== Sales ==
Year	China
2024	20,761
2025	66,766
