= CALB =

Chinese battery company

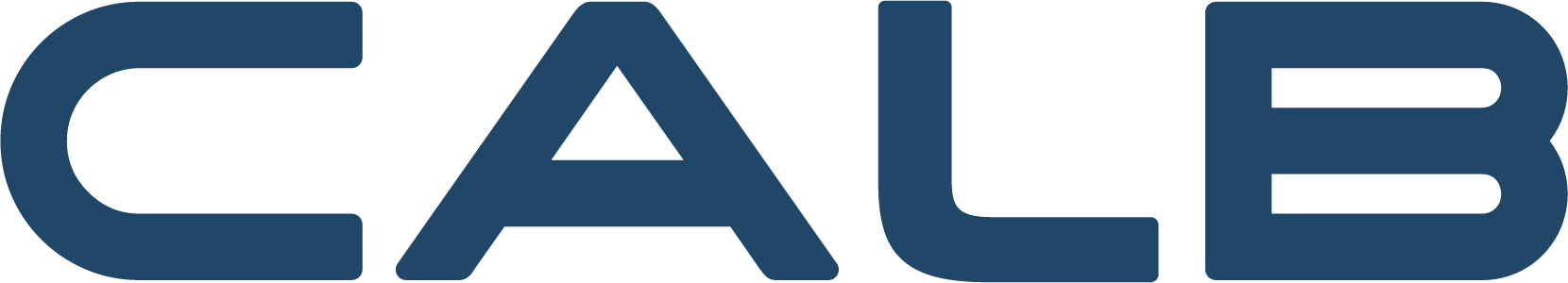
- Native name: 中创新航科技集团股份有限公司
- Traded as: HKG: 3931
- Industry: Lithium-ion batteries
- Founded: 2015
- Headquarters: Changzhou, China
- Key people: Liu Jingyu (CEO)
- Website: en.calb-tech.com

China Aviation Lithium Battery (CALB) is a partially state-owned developer and manufacturer of lithium-ion batteries. It is headquartered in Changzhou, Jiangsu province.

In 2022, CALB was the 7th largest supplier of batteries for electric vehicles in the world, 3rd in China (behind CATL and BYD). Its products also include batteries for the grid energy storage.

== History ==
CALB was founded in 2007 as part of the China Airborne Missile Academy, a division of Aviation Industry Corporation of China (AVIC). It is currently controlled by the Changzhou city government.

In 2011, CALB received a large order from the Hangzhou government after it started using CALB batteries on electric taxis.

By 2013, CALB was leading in market share for commercial electric vehicle batteries in China.

In 2017, the company suffered large losses as some important commercial vehicle battery customers left, leading AVIC to look for a buyer for the company. At the time, CALB was still headquartered in Luoyang, but the Luoyang government was unable to provide the required financial support. Eventually, the Changzhou government bought the company and moved its headquarters to Changzhou.

Under chairwoman Liu Jingyu, the company focused on the passenger electric vehicle battery market, and started making profit again.

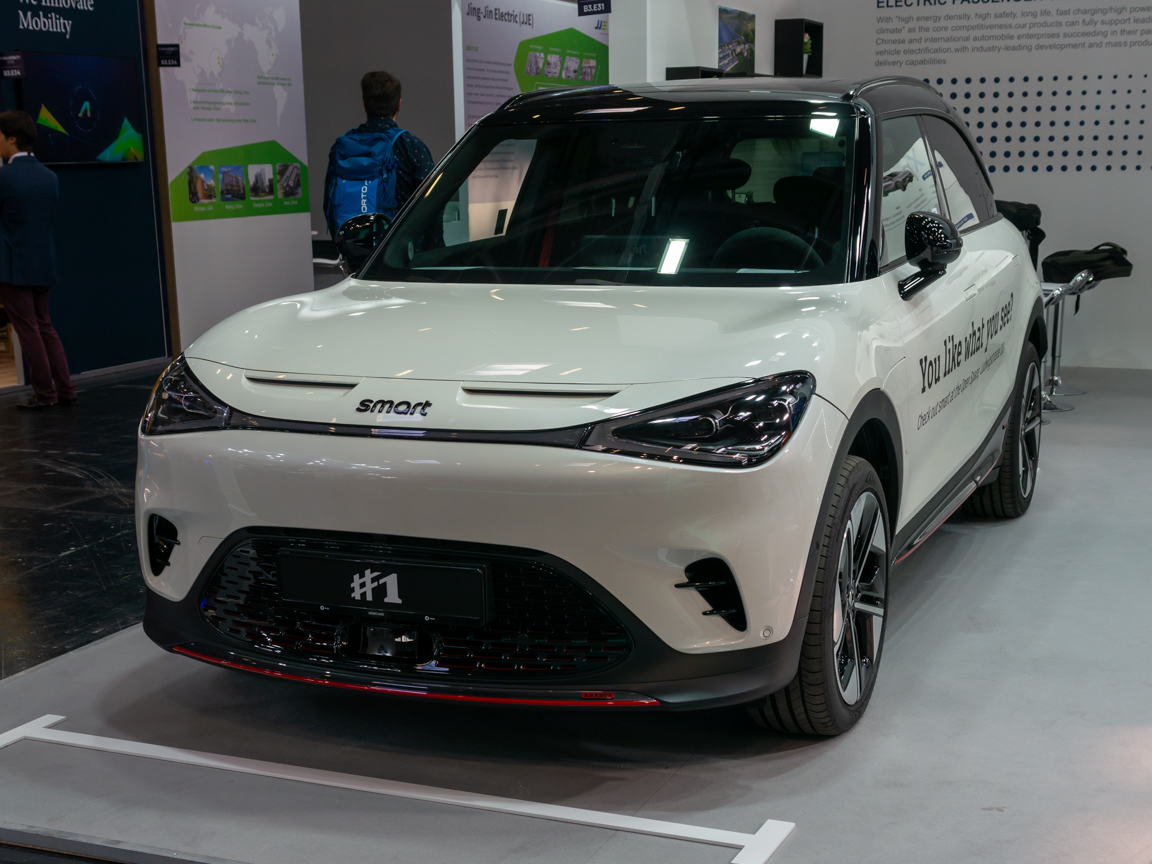
Smart #1, in December 2023 it was the best selling EV containing CALB's batteries

In 2021, half of CALB's sales went to Chinese car manufacturer GAC. Other customers include Changan, Leapmotor and XPeng. Meanwhile, CALB had spun off its military business.

The company has doubled in size for three consecutive years, as it batteries were considered safer and cheaper than the competition.

In October 2022, CALB raised HK$9.9 billion in an initial public offering. In June 2026, the US Department of Defense added CALB to a list of Chinese military-linked companies.
