= XPeng P7 =

Battery electric executive sedan

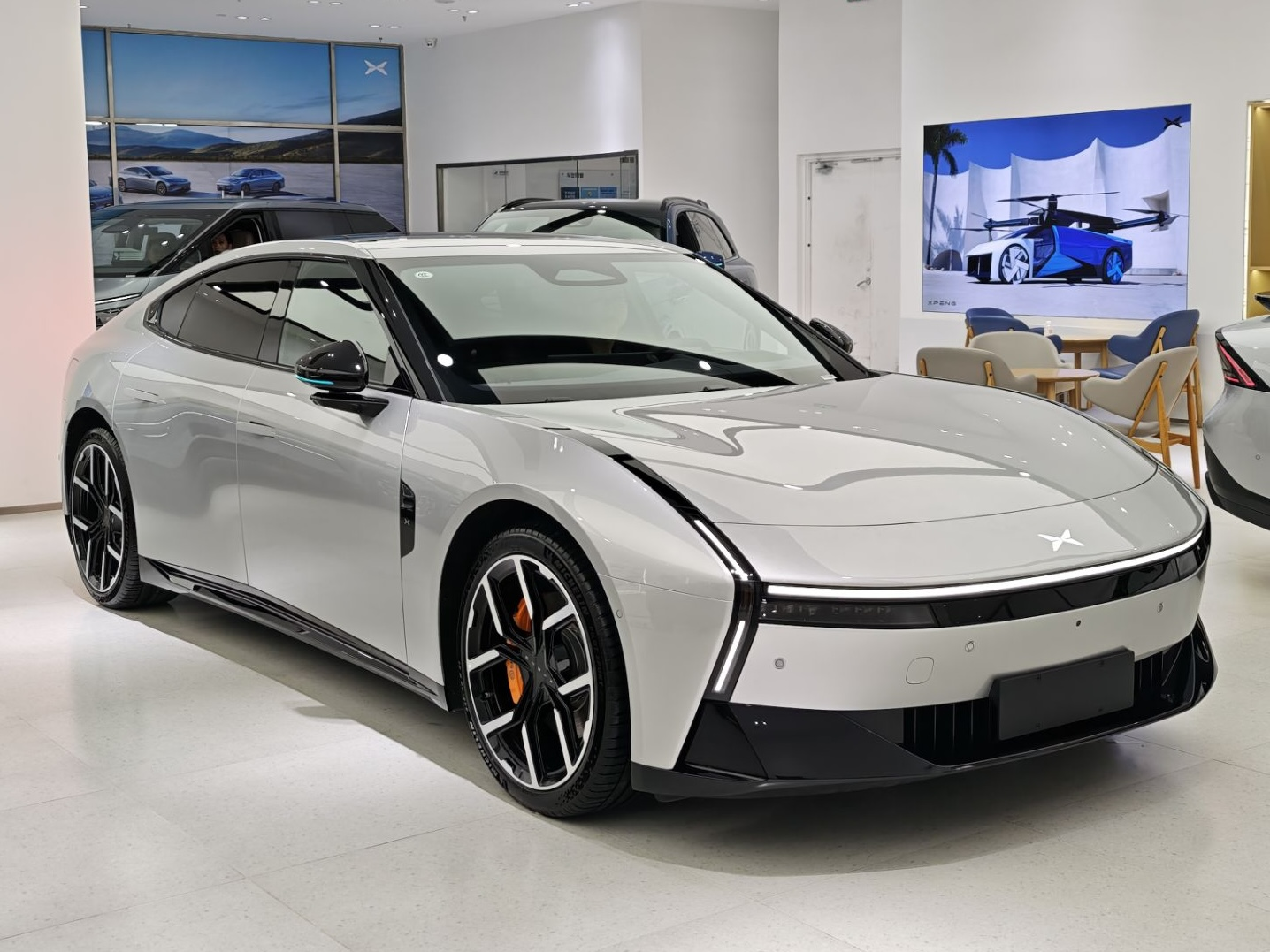

Overview
- Manufacturer: XPeng
- Production: June 2020 – present

Body and chassis
- Class: Executive car (E)
- Body style: 4-door fastback sedan
- Related: XPeng P7+

The XPeng P7 (Chinese: 小鹏P7; pinyin: Xiǎopéng P7) is a battery electric executive sedan manufactured by Chinese electric car company XPeng, which started deliveries in the Chinese market on 29 June 2020. Later, a refreshed version called the XPeng P7i was released in 2023. The second generation model was first revealed in May 2025, and went on sale in the third quarter of 2025.

== First generation (E28; 2020) ==
First generation
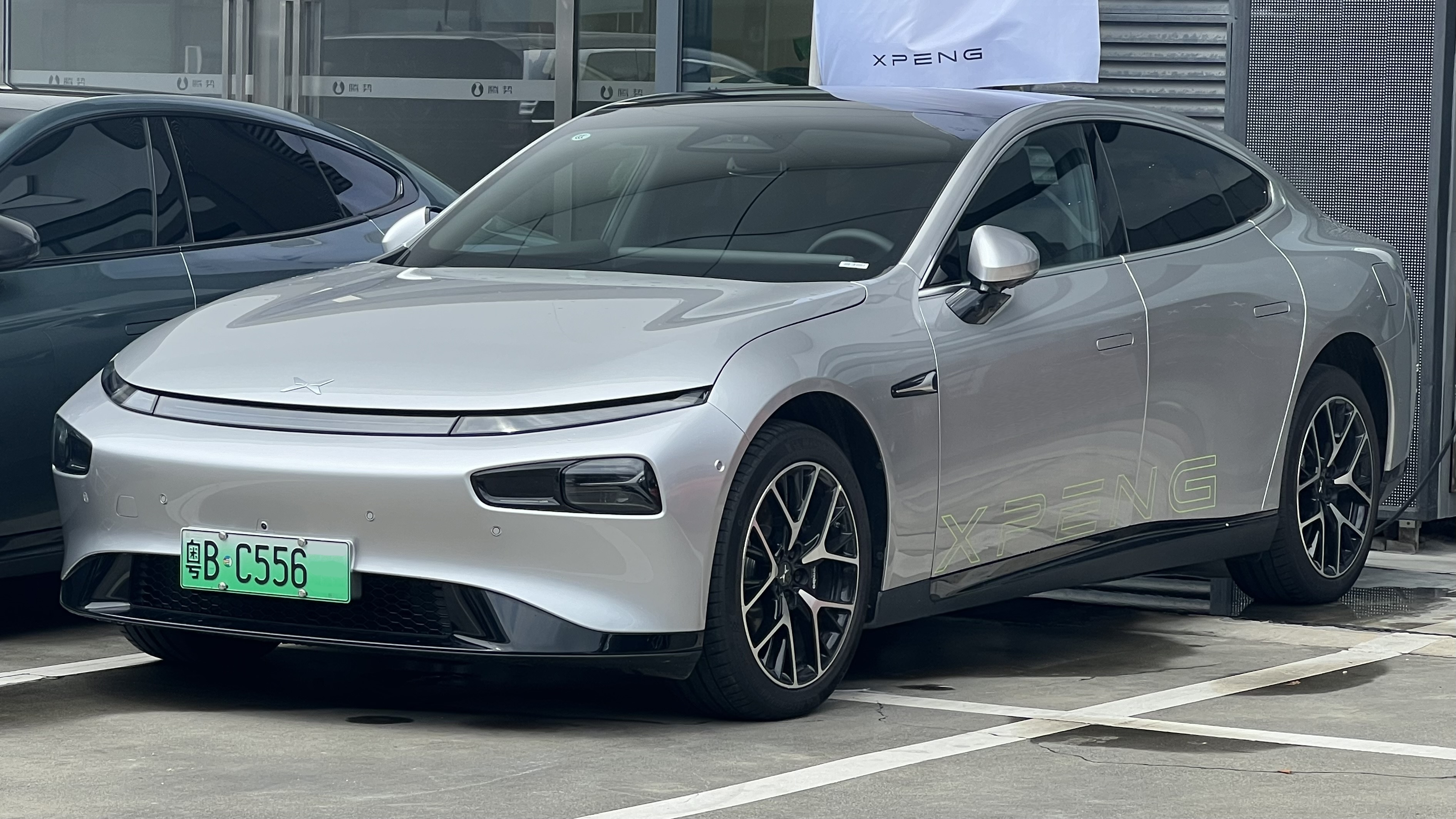
- XPeng P7i

Overview
- Model code: E28
- Also called: XPeng P7i (facelift)
- Production: June 2020 – 2025
- Assembly: China: Zhaoqing, Guangdong
- Designer: Rafik Ferrag

Body and chassis
- Layout: Rear-motor, rear-wheel drive; Dual-motor all-wheel drive
- Platform: SEPA (Smart Electric Platform Architecture)
- Doors: Conventional (standard models); Scissor front + conventional Rear (P7 Wing)

Powertrain
- Electric motor: Permanent magnet synchronous
- Transmission: 1-speed fixed gear
- Battery: 60.2–64.4 kWh LFP; 70.8–80.87 kWh NMC
- Electric range: NEDC: 480–706 km (298–439 mi) (P7); 562 km (349 mi) (P7 Performance); 550–702 km (342–436 mi) (P7i); 610 km (379 mi) (P7i Performance)

Dimensions
- Wheelbase: 2,998 mm (118.0 in)
- Length: 4,880 mm (192 in)
- Width: 1,896 mm (74.6 in)
- Height: 1,450 mm (57 in)
- Curb weight: 1,865–1,910 kg (4,112–4,211 lb); 2,060 kg (4,540 lb) (Performance)

=== Concept ===
The XPeng P7 debuted as a semi-concept car on the 2019 Auto Shanghai show in April 2019. On November 30, 2019, the production model was unveiled at Auto Guangzhou 2019.

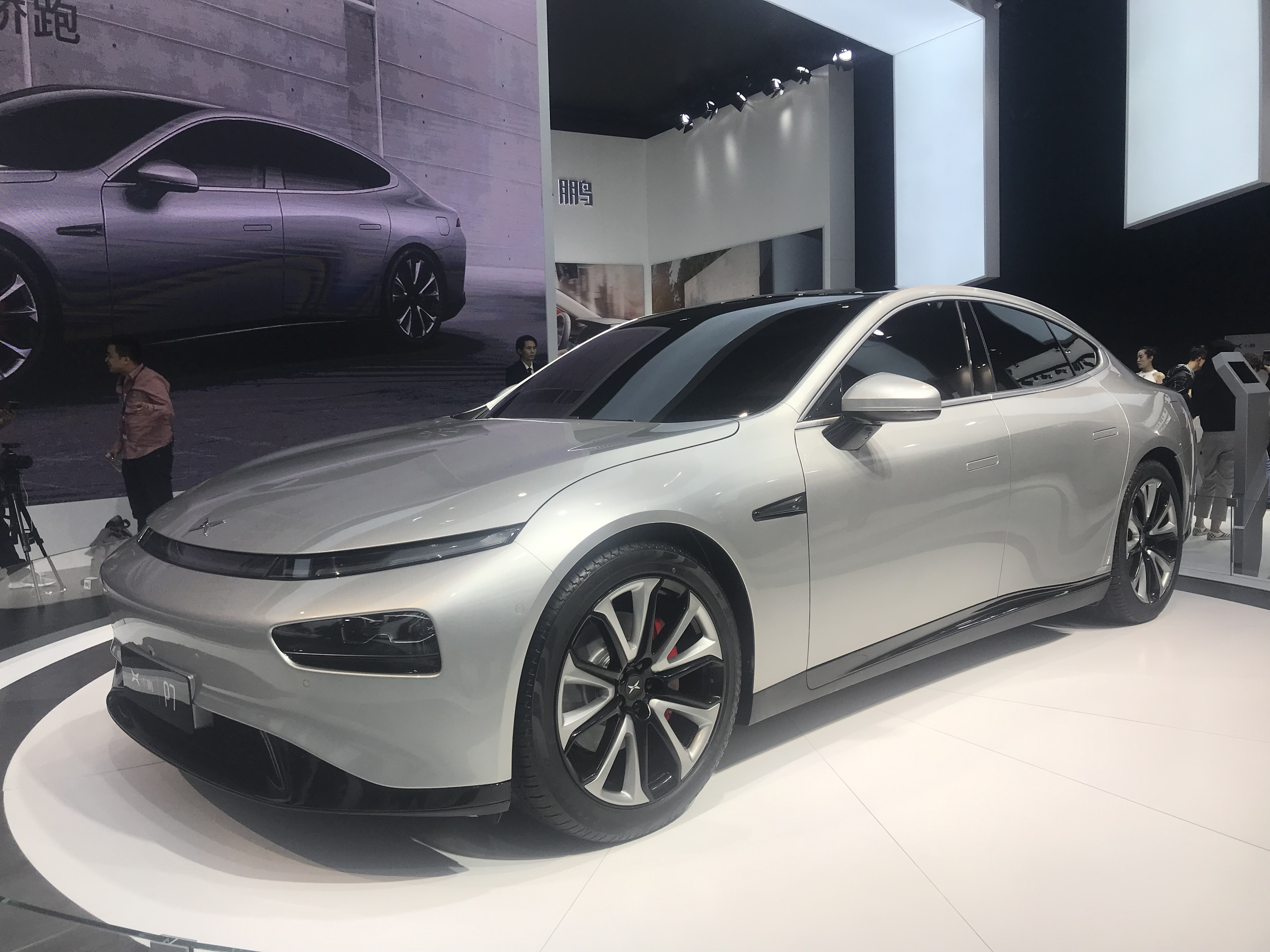
XPeng P7 Concept

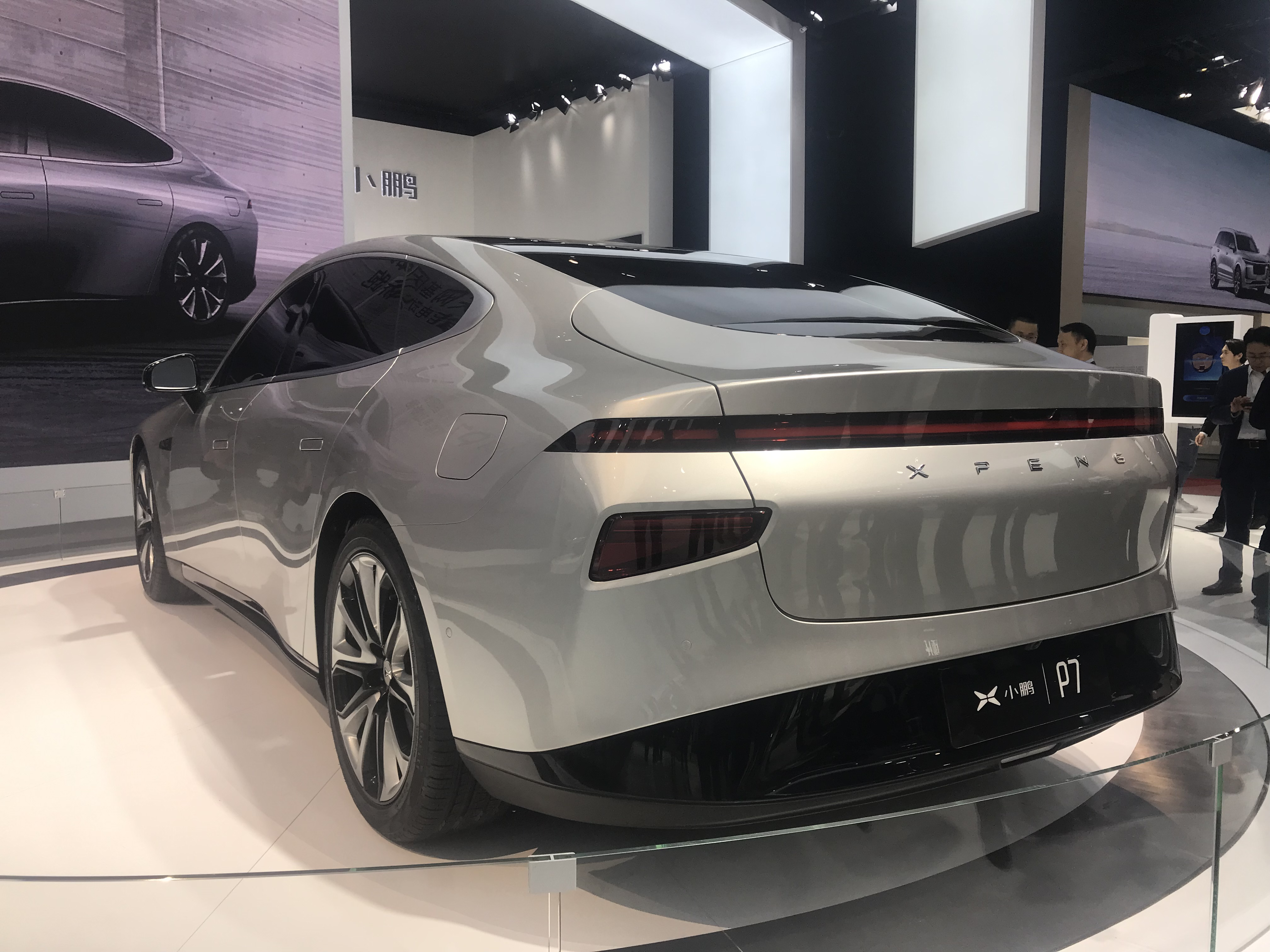
XPeng P7 Concept rear quarter

=== Production ===
As a midsize electric sedan, the XPeng P7 is a direct competitor to the Tesla Model 3. As XPeng's second model after the G3, the range of the new sedan will be improved compared to the G3. According to the official release, the size of the XPeng P7 will be larger than most mid-size cars, with a wheelbase typical of mid-to-large size vehicles. In terms of battery life, the company said that "the range will be greatly improved" with a range of 562 to 706 km (349 to 439 mi) (NEDC) claimed. The XPeng P7 made its world debut at the 2019 Auto Shanghai show. Deliveries to customers started on 29 June 2020.

The XPeng P7 is equipped with XPILOT 3.0, which is an autonomous driving assistance system that features XPeng Navigation Guided Pilot (XNGP). It is equipped with 31 autonomous driving sensors in total, including 5 millimeter wave radars, 14 high-definition cameras, and 12 ultrasonic sensors, giving the XPeng P7 omnidirectional perception to supervise the changes of the surrounding environment. Data is processed on an Nvidia Drive AGX Xavier SoC to enable functions such as automated driving and valet parking. The XPeng P7 is also equipped with an adaptive cruise control (ACC) system as standard.

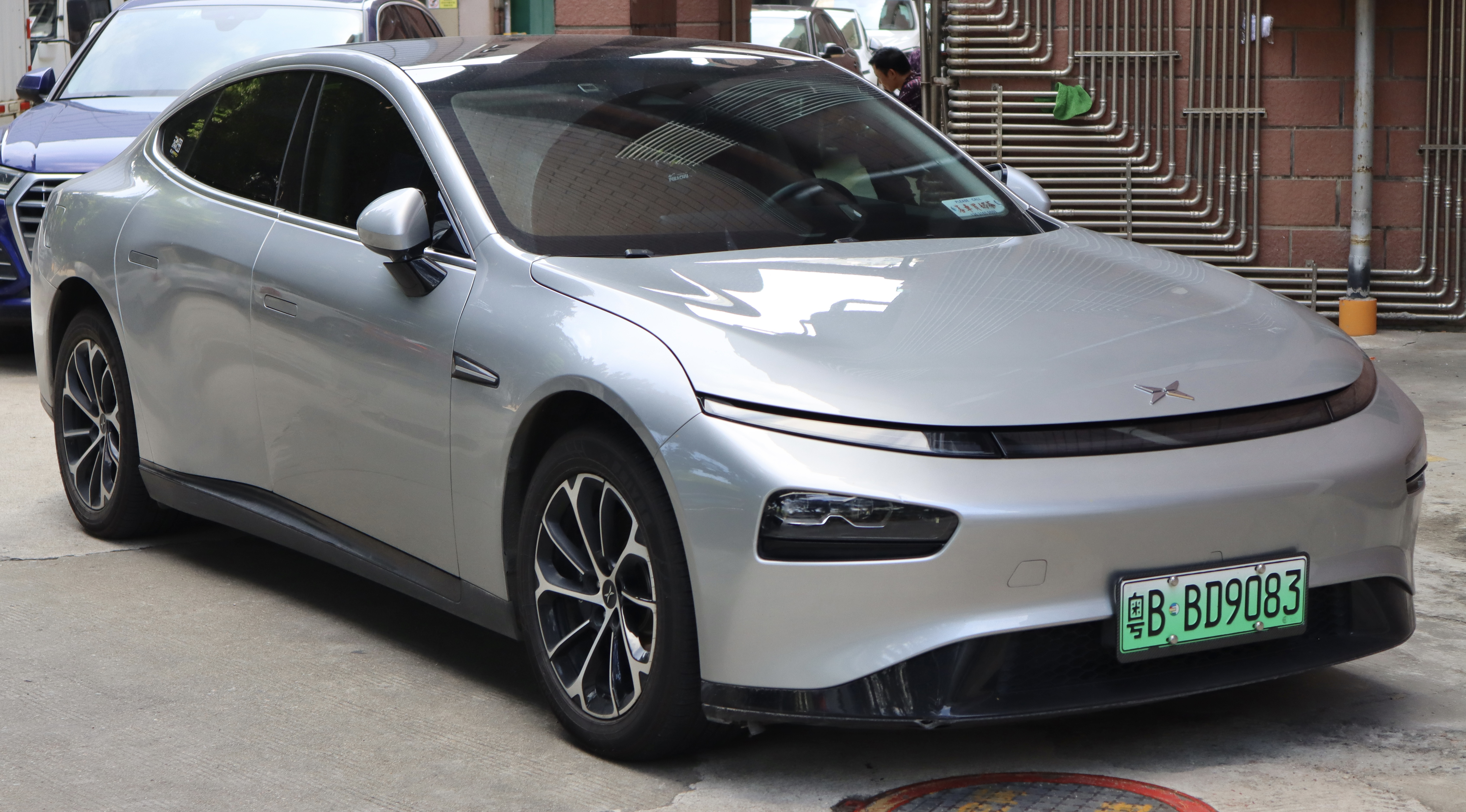
XPeng P7

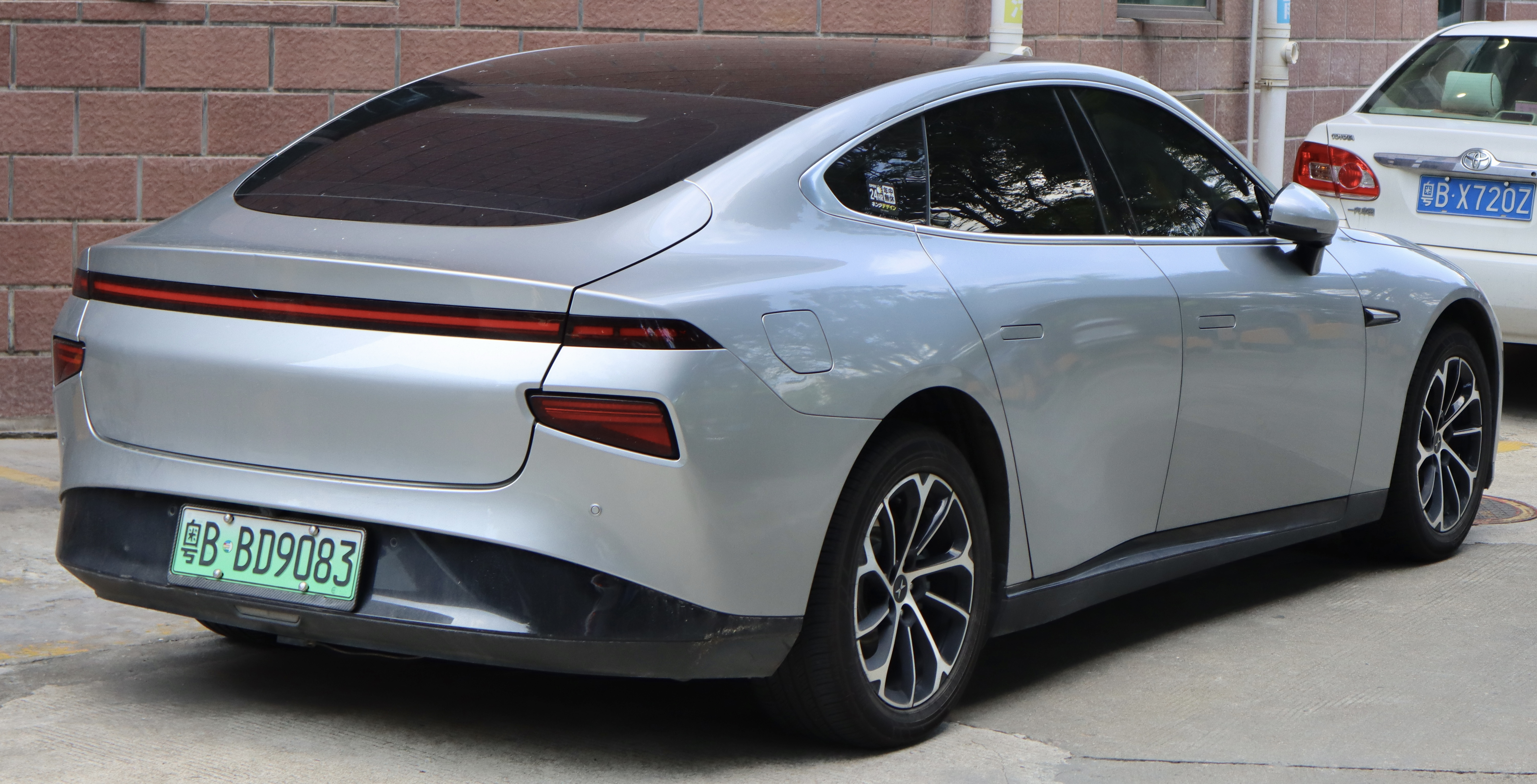
XPeng P7 rear quarter

As of February 2021, listing images of an updated version of the P7 powered by lithium iron phosphate battery supplied by Contemporary Amperex Technology Co. Limited (CATL) surfaced. The lithium iron phosphate battery powered models share the same design and features of the regular nickel cobalt manganese (also known as NCM or Ternary) lithium-ion battery models, and is powered by an electric motor with a maximum output of 196 kW (263 hp; 266 PS), and a rated output of 80 kW (107 hp; 109 PS).

=== XPeng P7 Wing ===
On November 20, 2021, the XPeng P7 Wing limited edition was unveiled at Auto Guangzhou. It has electrically operated front scissor doors, which are equipped with radars on each side to automatically detect and avoid collisions with obstructing obstacles when opening.

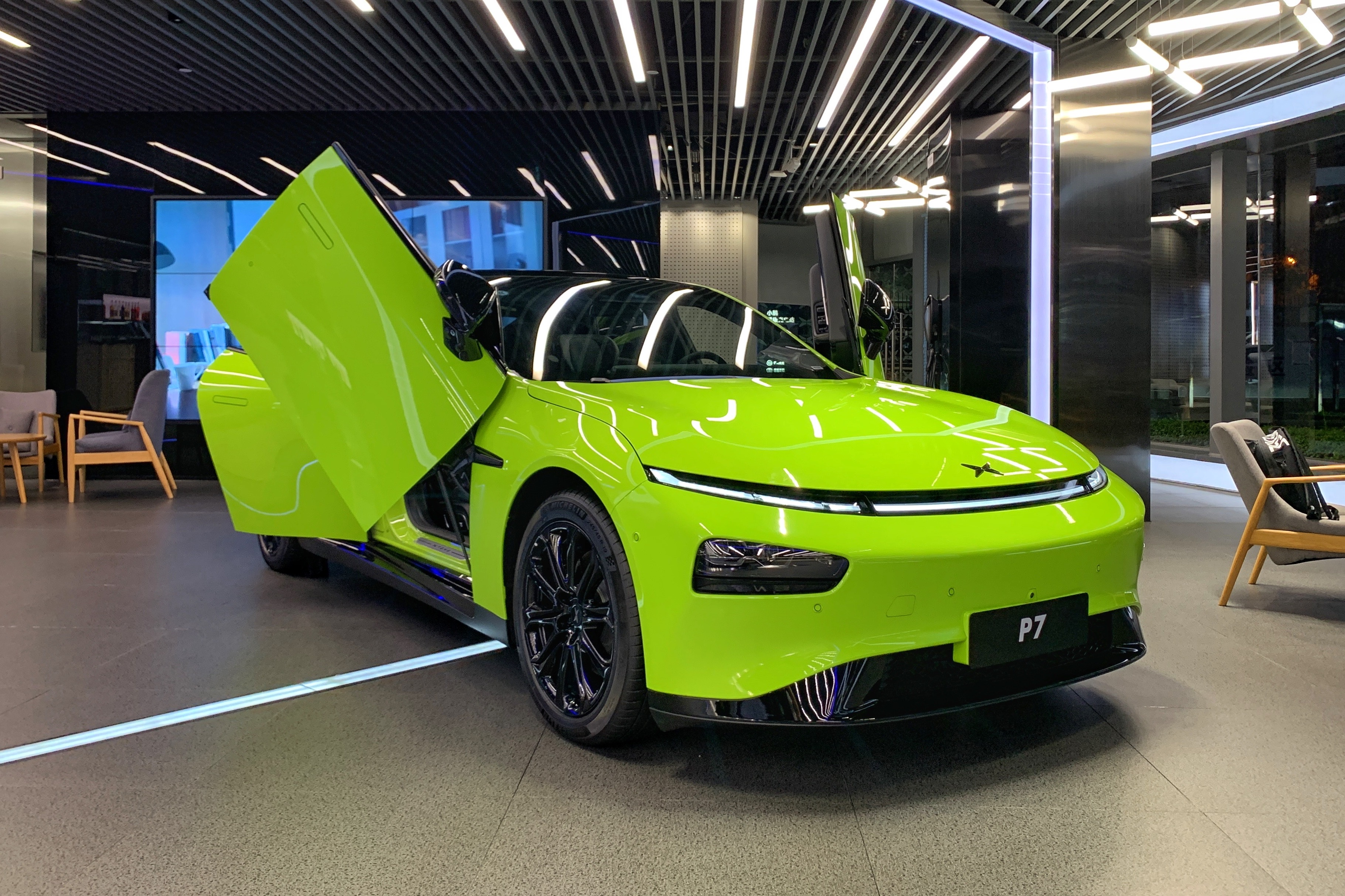
XPeng P7 Wing Edition (front view)

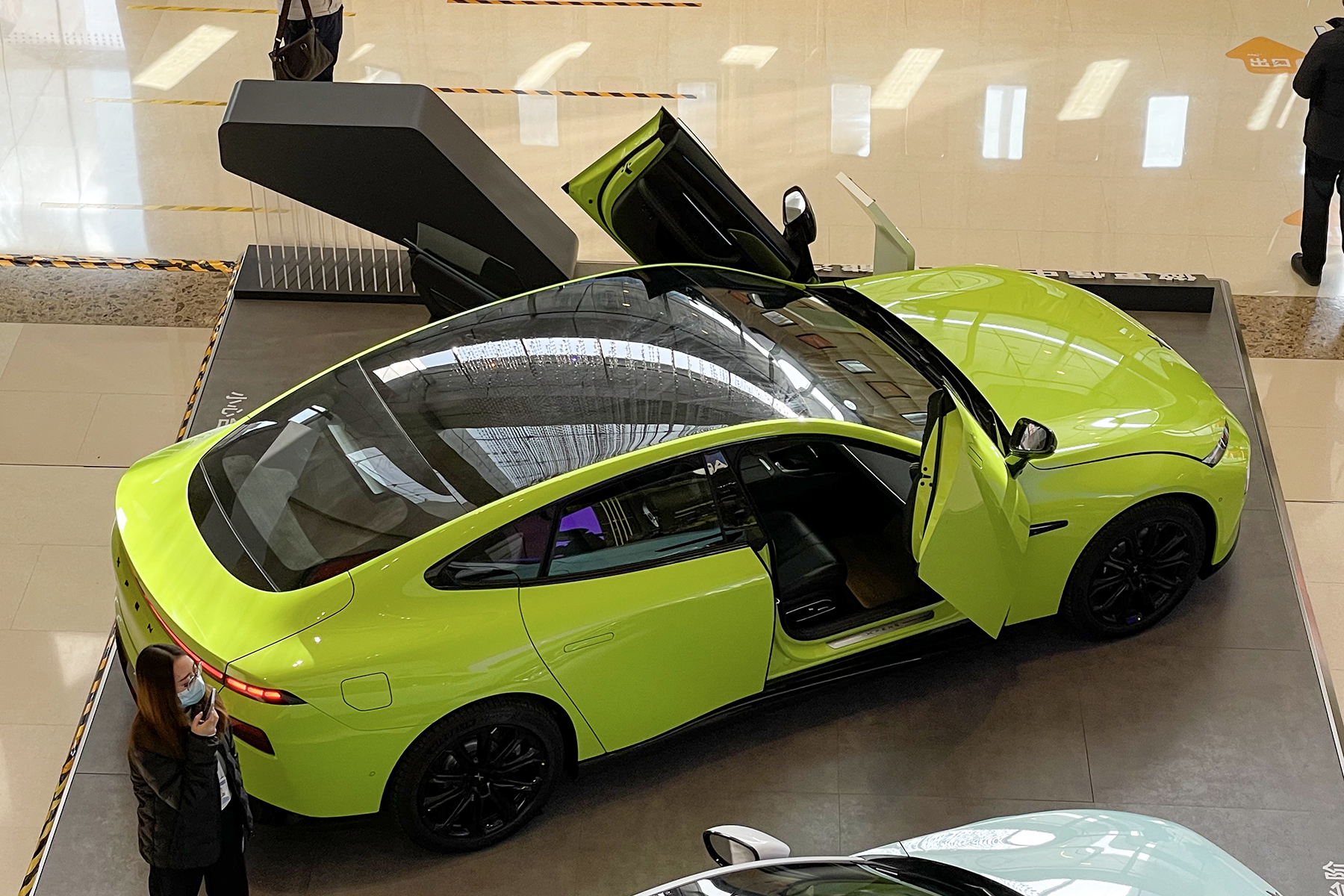
XPeng P7 Wing Edition (side view)

=== XPeng P7i (E28a) ===
The XPeng P7i is the refreshed version of the XPeng P7 for 2023. The facelift features the second generation XNGP XPeng intelligent driving assist system also found in the G9, which adds two LiDAR sensors, and two Nvidia Orin X chips replace the Xavier chips found in the original P7, providing up to 508 TOPS of calculation ability compared to the previous system's 30 TOPS. This allows for the introduction of two self driving modes, the first of which is called 'City NGP' which is a fully self driving system that relies on high-definition mapping, and was initially only available in Shanghai, Guangzhou and Shenzhen at launch. The second system is called 'LCC' and works as a lane-centering cruise control which can obey traffic signals and cross intersections, but is not capable of making turns; it is usable in all parts of China. An update in the second half of 2023 allowed the 'City NGP' mode to function without high-definition maps, allowing for use anywhere in China.

The powertrain received an update, with rear wheel drive models now producing 203 kW (272 hp; 276 PS) and 440 N⋅m (325 lb⋅ft) of torque, while Performance variants add a 145 kW (194 hp; 197 PS) front induction motor for all-wheel drive and now produce a combined total of 348 kW (467 hp; 473 PS) and 757 N⋅m (558 lb⋅ft) of torque with an improved 0–100 km/h (0–62 mph) time of 3.9 seconds. These output increases were achieved by increasing the cooling capacity by 89% while retaining the same motors, allowing for sustained travel at 190 kilometres per hour (118 mph) for up to 30 minutes without overheating, and 15% higher range in cold-weather conditions according to XPeng. CLTC range for rear-wheel drive models is 702 kilometres (436 mi) and 610 kilometres (379 mi) for Performance models.

It is 8 mm (0.31 in) shorter than the P7 due to revised rear body panels and taillight changes, but all other dimensions remain the same. The interior features several materials upgrades, including Nappa leather seats and a redesigned steering wheel and lower dashboard; additionally, the chipset running the dashboard screens has been upgraded to the Snapdragon SA8155P. A heat pump now comes standard, along with an electric motorized door option and an external trunk release. There is now an available twenty-speaker Dynaudio sound system with Dolby Atmos software.

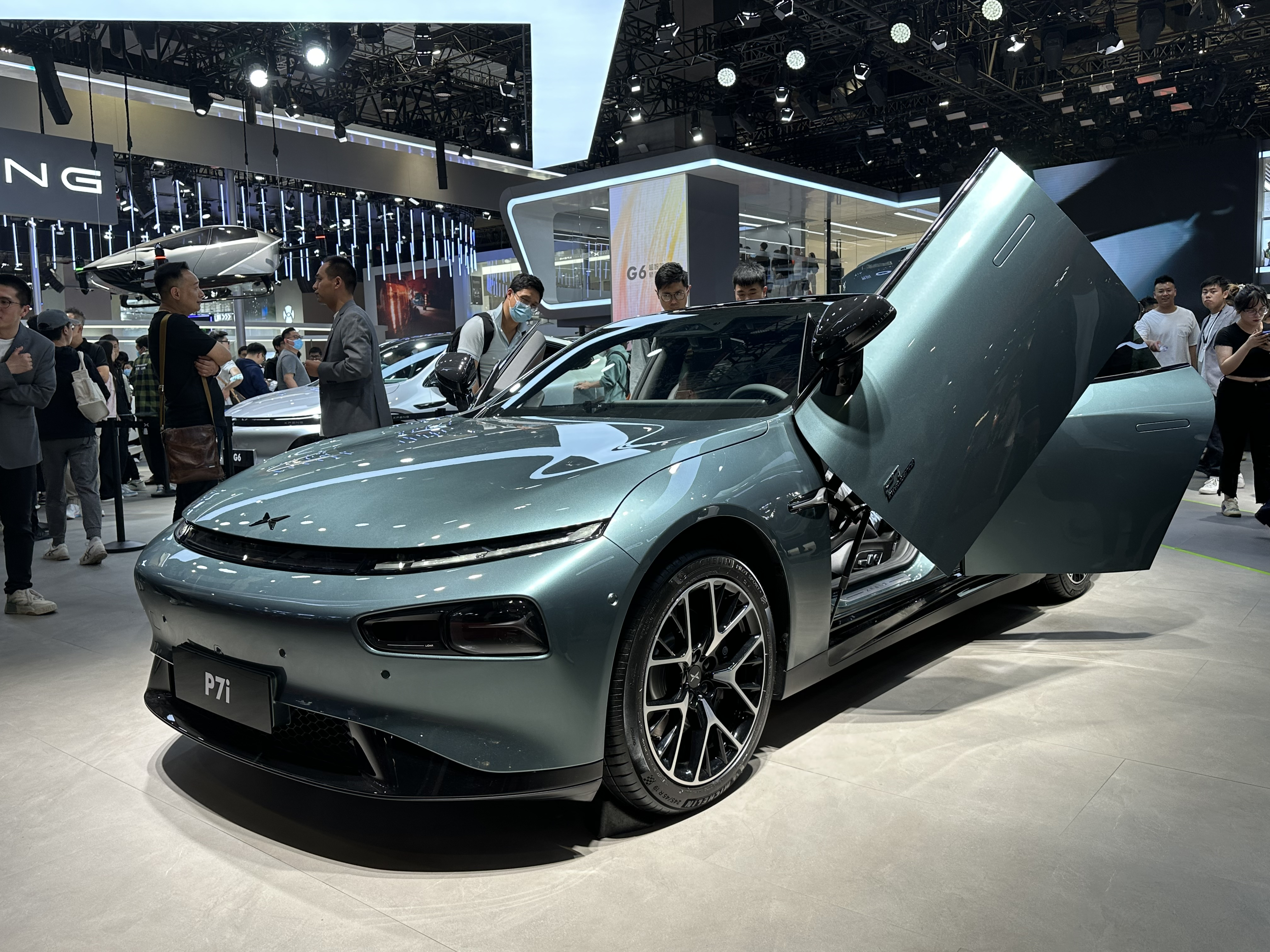
XPeng P7i Wing Edition

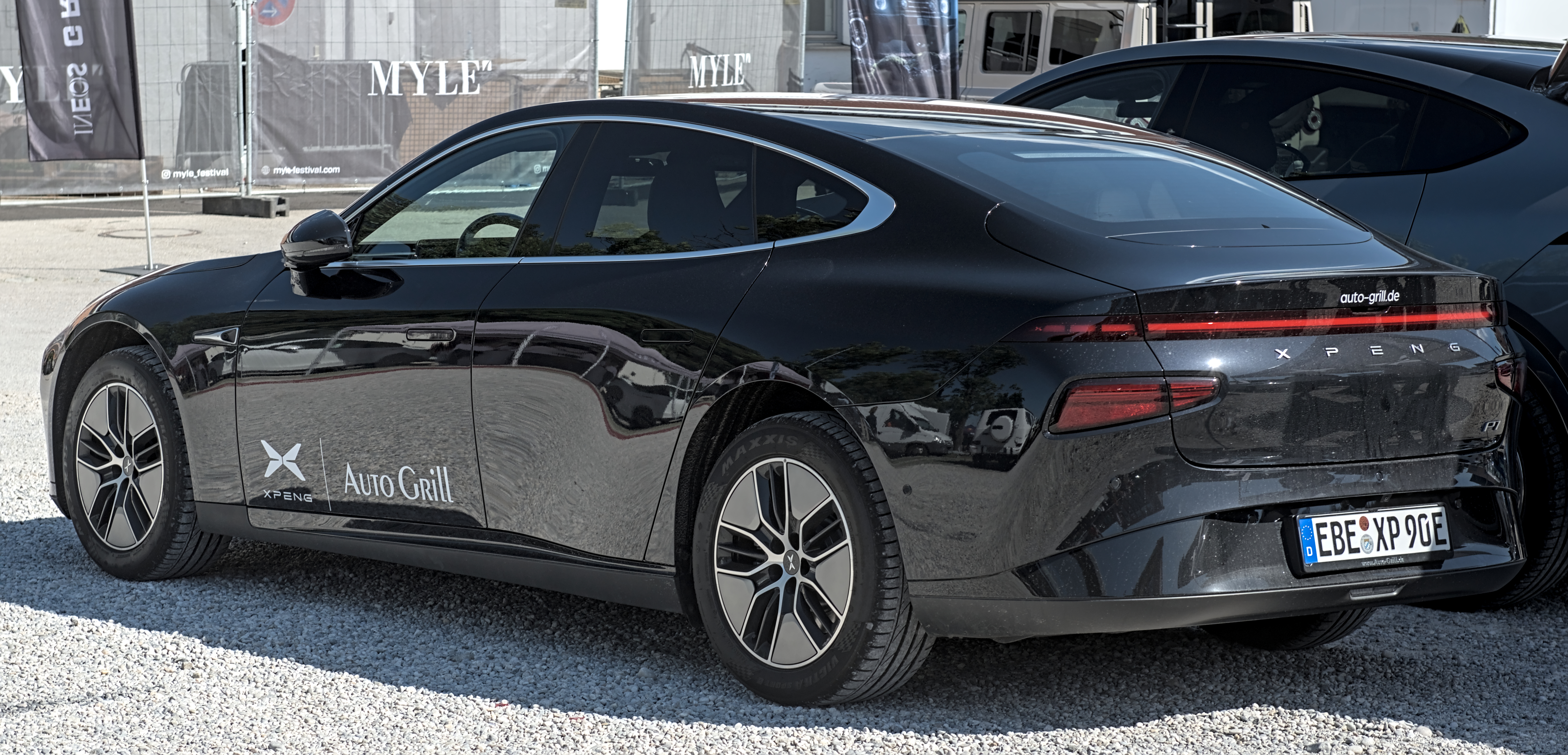
Rear view

=== Powertrains ===
Model name	Battery	Power	Torque	Range (CLTC)	Top Speed	0–100 km/h (62 mph) time
P7
P7 480	60.2 kWh LFP CATL	196 kW (263 hp; 266 PS)	390 N⋅m (288 lb⋅ft)	480 km (298 mi)	170 km/h (106 mph)	6.7 s
P7 586	70.8 kWh NMC CALB	196 kW (263 hp; 266 PS)	390 N⋅m (288 lb⋅ft)	586 km (364 mi)	170 km/h (106 mph)	6.7 s
P7 625	77.9 kWh NMC	196 kW (263 hp; 266 PS)	390 N⋅m (288 lb⋅ft)	625 km (388 mi)	170 km/h (106 mph)	6.7 s
P7 670	80.9 kWh NMC CATL	196 kW (263 hp; 266 PS)	390 N⋅m (288 lb⋅ft)	670 km (416 mi)	170 km/h (106 mph)	6.7 s
P7 706	80.9 kWh NMC CATL	196 kW (263 hp; 266 PS)	390 N⋅m (288 lb⋅ft)	706 km (439 mi)	170 km/h (106 mph)	6.7 s
P7 4WD Performance	80.9 kWh NMC CATL	Front: 120 kW (161 hp; 163 PS); Rear: 196 kW (263 hp; 266 PS); Total: 316 kW (424 hp; 430 PS)	655 N⋅m (483 lb⋅ft)	562 km (349 mi)	170 km/h (106 mph)	4.3 s
P7i
P7i 550	64.4 kWh LFP EVE Energy	203 kW (272 hp; 276 PS)	440 N⋅m (325 lb⋅ft)	550 km (342 mi)	200 km/h (124 mph)	6.4 s
P7i 702	86.2 kWh NMC CALB	203 kW (272 hp; 276 PS)	440 N⋅m (325 lb⋅ft)	702 km (436 mi)	200 km/h (124 mph)	6.4 s
P7i Performance	86.2 kWh NMC CALB	Front: 145 kW (194 hp; 197 PS); Rear: 203 kW (272 hp; 276 PS); Total: 348 kW (467 hp; 473 PS)	757 N⋅m (558 lb⋅ft)	610 km (379 mi)	200 km/h (124 mph)	3.9 s

=== Awards ===
The Xpeng P7 won the Xuanyuan Awards Car of The Year 2021.

=== In media ===
- On 8 September 2022, the Xpeng P7 was added to the videogame Forza Horizon 5 as part of the Rami's Racing History update, initially obtainable for free by completing in-game seasonal events from the 8th to the 15th.
- Forza Motorsport (2023)
- Need for Speed Assemble (2024)

=== Safety ===
Euro NCAP test results XPeng P7 80kWh electric (LHD) (2023)
Test	Points	%
Overall:	5 /5 stars	
Adult occupant:	35	87%
Child occupant:	40	81%
Pedestrian:	51.5	81%
Safety assist:	14.2	78%

C-NCAP (2018) test results 2021 XPeng P7 RWD Ultra-long range Intelligent
Category		%
Overall:	5 /5 stars	89.4%
Occupant protection:		92.61%
Vulnerable road users:		65.11%
Active safety:		98.51%

== Second generation (E29; 2025) ==
Second generation
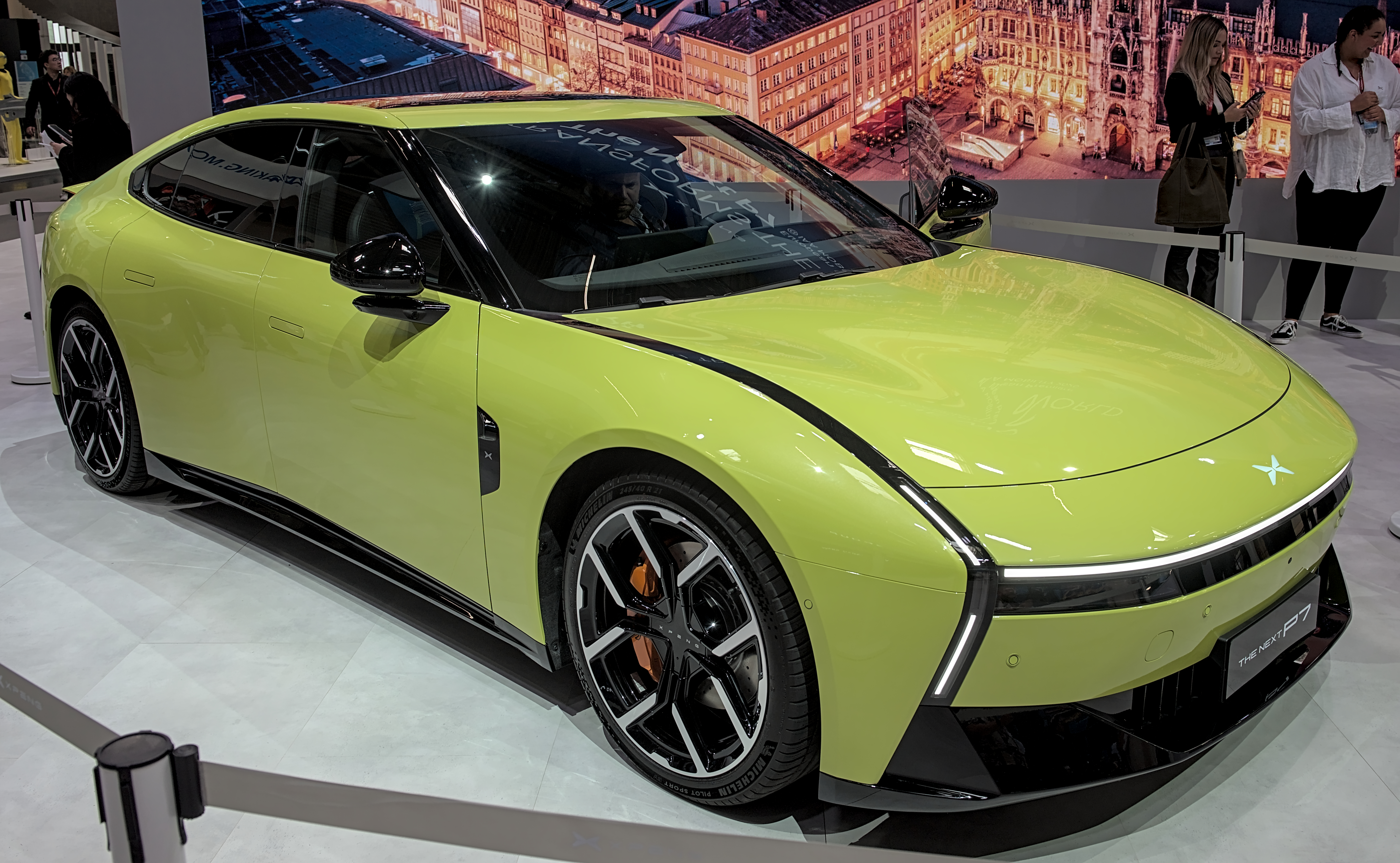

Overview
- Model code: E29
- Production: 2025–present
- Assembly: China: Zhaoqing, Guangdong
- Designer: Rafik Ferrag, Yi Dong, Takahiro Miyamoto

Body and chassis
- Layout: Rear-motor, rear-wheel-drive; Dual-motor, all-wheel-drive
- Related: Volkswagen ID. Unyx 09

Powertrain
- Power output: 270–437 kW (362–586 hp; 367–594 PS)
- Battery: 74.9 kWh LFP Eve Energy; 92.2 kWh NMC CALB
- Electric range: 702–820 km (436–510 mi) (CLTC)
- Plug-in charging: DC: 486 kW

Dimensions
- Wheelbase: 3,008 mm (118.4 in)
- Length: 5,017 mm (197.5 in)
- Width: 1,970 mm (78 in)
- Height: 1,427 mm (56.2 in)
- Curb weight: 2,090–2,220 kg (4,610–4,890 lb)

The first images of the second generation P7 were released by XPeng on 14 May 2025 after XPeng designer Rafik Ferrag posted a teaser video of the model the day before. It debuted on 6 August 2025 where blind pre-orders opened, and pricing will be announced in late August. It is intended for global markets, according to XPeng. While the P7+ sedan it is sold alongside prioritizes interior space for family use, the P7 is differentiated by its focus on technology and performance.

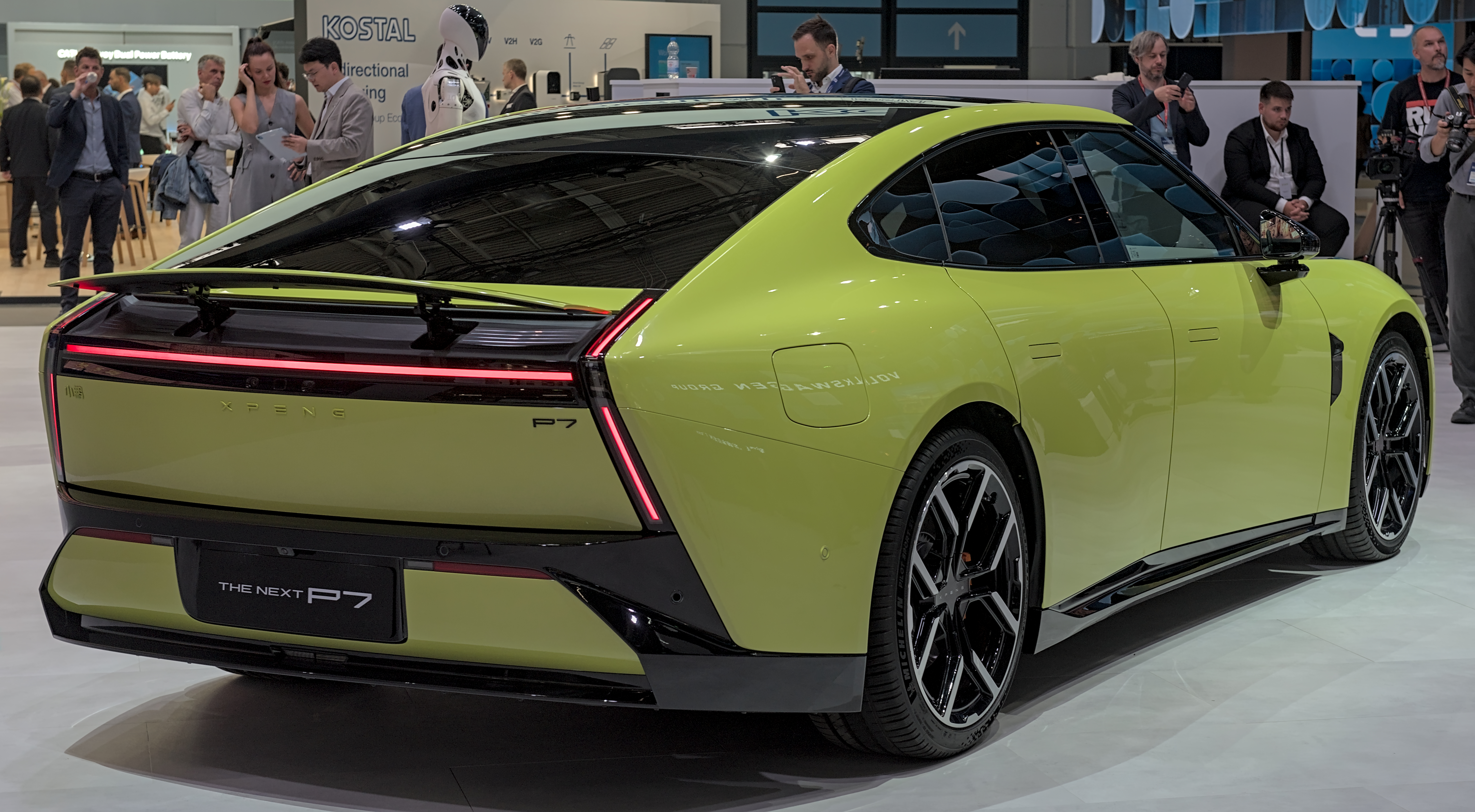
Rear view

The second generation P7 has a fastback liftback sedan body style with a lifting rear tailgate and uses XPeng's debuting 'Xmart Face' design language. It features a new front and rear lighting signature, flush-mounted door handles, optional power closing doors, frameless side mirrors, and an active rear spoiler. It has teal autonomous driving indicator lights integrated into the rear bumper and side mirrors. With the smallest wheels equipped, XPeng says it achieves a drag coefficient of 0.201 C_{d}.

XPeng says that the P7 has the longest L113 dimension (length from front axle to driver's foot) in its class at 628 mm (24.7 in), leading to sporty proportions. It is equipped with a dual-chamber air suspension system, and the front uses a double wishbone suspension while the rear uses a 5-link independent suspension. XPeng says the P7 has the lowest center of gravity in its class at 440 mm (17.3 in).

The interior features several debuting technologies for XPeng. The 15.6-inch central infotainment screen is capable of 3-axis movement, allowing it to face towards either front passenger and give visual feedback such as nodding movements. The front door sills have a capacitive touch button in the form of an illuminated fingerprint motif, which can be customized to perform a variety of configurable functions such as opening the glovebox or tailgate, control seat functions such as heating or ventilation settings, or activate interior lighting, with more options promised to be made available via future OTA updates. The front seats have active side bolsters with 30 mm (1.2 in) of lateral movement and a 10-millisecond response time. The three-spoke steering wheel has an oblong shape and features two hub-mounted dials for controlling drive mode and autonomous driving features in addition to the multifunction controls on the spokes. It has a narrow 8.8-inch digital instrument cluster supplemented by an 87-inch AR-HUD codeveloped with Huawei that debuted earlier in the G7, which XPeng claims is largest in its class. The AR-HUD can display overlaid lane-level navigation guidance and driver assistance information, and can be used to play AR games and movies when not driving. The interior is powered by a Qualcomm Snapdragon 8295P SoC, which is supplemented by a dedicated XPeng Turing AI chip for interior AI functions. The P7 is available with a 23-speaker sound system with 7.1.4 surround sound, and a 9-inch digital rearview mirror.

The second generation P7 features three of XPeng's self-developed Turing AI ADAS chip which debuting with the G7, which are capable of 750 TOPS each; two of the chips are used for ADAS functions, while one is dedicated to interior AI functions. Its updated supervised autonomous driving system does not feature a LiDAR, like the P7+ introduced in late 2024; its sensor suite consists of three 4D mmWave radars, 12 cameras, and 12 ultrasonic sensors.

=== Wing Edition ===
The second-generation P7 is also offered with a Wing Edition, which features front scissor doors. Additionally, it is available in an exclusive matte Crescent Silver paint, 21-inch grey forged wheels, and carbon fiber exterior accents. The interior also receives exclusive Orange Radiance Dinamica-upholstered sports seats and exclusive trim pieces including darkened metal door sills.

=== Powertrain ===
All versions of the P7 are equipped with 800-volt silicon carbide power electronics and are capable of 5C charge rates. The basic version of the P7 is rear-wheel-drive and equipped with a 74.9 kWh Eve Energy-supplied LFP battery pack paired with a Luxshare-supplied permanent magnet motor outputting 270 kW (362 hp; 367 PS). The longer range variant pairs the same motor with a larger 92.2 kWh CALB-supplied NMC battery pack capable of up to 486 kW peak charging rates, allowing it to charge 525 km (326 mi) of range in 10 minutes, or charge from 10–80% in 11.3 minutes. The all-wheel drive variant uses the larger battery and adds a 167 kW (224 hp; 227 PS) induction motor to the front axle for a total of 586 hp (437 kW; 594 PS). All versions have a top speed of 230 km/h (143 mph).

Model	Battery	Power			Torque	Range	Charging		0–100 km/h (62 mph) time	Top speed	Weight
Model	Battery	Front	Rear	Total	Total	CLTC	Peak DC	10–80% time	0–100 km/h (62 mph) time	Top speed	Weight
702 Long Range	74.9 kWh LFP Eve Energy	—	270 kW LuxshareTZ230XY01E29X PMSM (110 kW rated)	362 hp (270 kW; 367 PS)	465 N⋅m (343 lb⋅ft)	702 km (436 mi)		12 min	5.8 s	230 km/h (143 mph)	2,125 kg (4,685 lb)
820 Ultra-Long Range	92.2 kWh NMC CALB	—	270 kW LuxshareTZ230XY01E29X PMSM (110 kW rated)	362 hp (270 kW; 367 PS)	465 N⋅m (343 lb⋅ft)	820 km (510 mi)	486 kW	11.3 min	5.4 s	230 km/h (143 mph)	2,090 kg (4,608 lb)
750 4WD Performance	92.2 kWh NMC CALB	167 kW XPeng YS230XY01E29X AC induction (50 kW rated)	270 kW LuxshareTZ230XY01E29X PMSM (110 kW rated)	586 hp (437 kW; 594 PS)	695 N⋅m (513 lb⋅ft)	750 km (466 mi)	486 kW	11.3 min	3.7 s	230 km/h (143 mph)	2,188–2,220 kg (4,824–4,894 lb)

== Sales ==
Total XPeng sales in the Chinese market passed the 10,000 mark after less than six months after the introduction of the P7.

The second-generation P7 received 10,000 refundable pre-orders within 6 minutes and 37 seconds of launching on 6 August 2025.

Year	China
2020	15,315
2021	60,569
2022	59,066
2023	46,375
2024	16,859
2025	20,872

== See also ==
- XPeng P7+
