= Foton View i-series =

Battery electric van

Foton View i9/i7
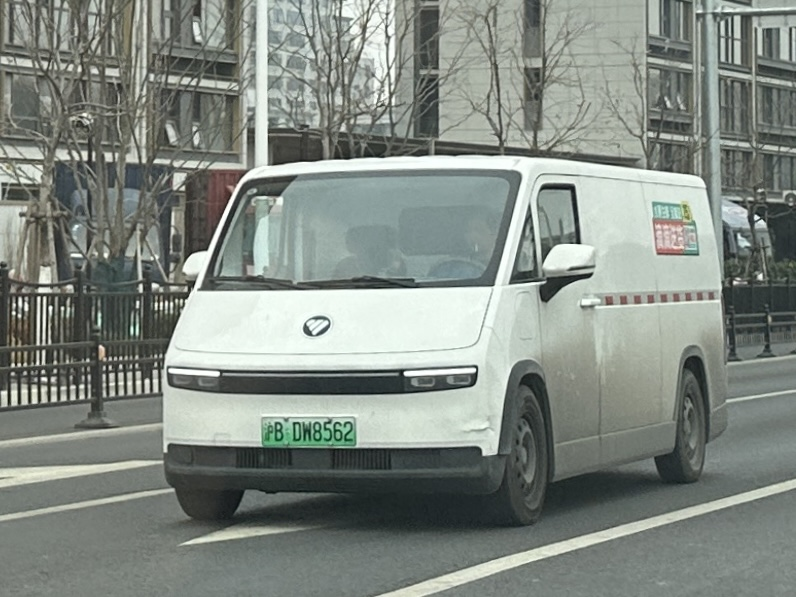
- The Foton View i9 in Shanghai.

Overview
- Manufacturer: Foton Motor
- Also called: Foton Cavan Lefu; Forland (Foton Xiangling) U7; Foton View T7 (pickup variant); NEX Vanastic (Thailand); CP Foton eVIEW Connect i-Series (Thailand); Cavan C1 (Australia)
- Production: 2024–present
- Assembly: China: Beijing (BAIC Foton); Thailand: Samut Prakan (NEX Point)

Body and chassis
- Class: Light commercial vehicle (M)
- Body style: 4/5-door van; 2/4-door pickup truck (View T7)
- Layout: Front-engine, front-wheel-drive
- Platform: FEEP (Foton Electronics & Electrical Platform)

Powertrain
- Electric motor: Permanent magnet synchronous electric motor
- Power output: 110 kW (150 PS; 148 hp); 125 kW (170 PS; 168 hp) (FTTBP125A)
- Battery: View i7: 41.86 – 51.52 kWh Eve Energy/CATL LFP; View i9: 50.23 – 66.67 kWh CATL LFP
- Range: 308–460 km (191–286 mi) (CLTC); 274–371 km (170–231 mi) (NEDC)

Dimensions
- Wheelbase: 3,400 mm (133.9 in) (i9); 3,100 mm (122.0 in) (i7)
- Length: 5,195 mm (204.5 in) (i9); 4,895 mm (192.7 in) (i7)
- Width: 1,810 mm (71.3 in)
- Height: 1,930–2,160 mm (76.0–85.0 in)

The Foton View i, currently of the Foton View i9 and the shorter Foton View i7 is a battery electric van produced by the Chinese automaker Foton since 2024.

== Overview ==
The View i series was launched in China on 18 November 2024. The View i series is an fully electric urban logistics vans, specially designed for the needs of urban logistics and distribution.

== Specifications ==
The View i9 has CATL supplied battery variants of 50.23, 51.52, 60.37, 66.67kWh respectively supporting a range of 335, 340, 350, 355, 360, 410, 420, 435, 440, 450, 460 km base on the specification. Equipped with a selection of 41.86, 43.53, 50.23, 51.52 kW EVE Energy and CATL supplied batteries, the View i7 vans achieves a respective range of 300, 308, 315, 350, 355, 360, 370 km base on the model.

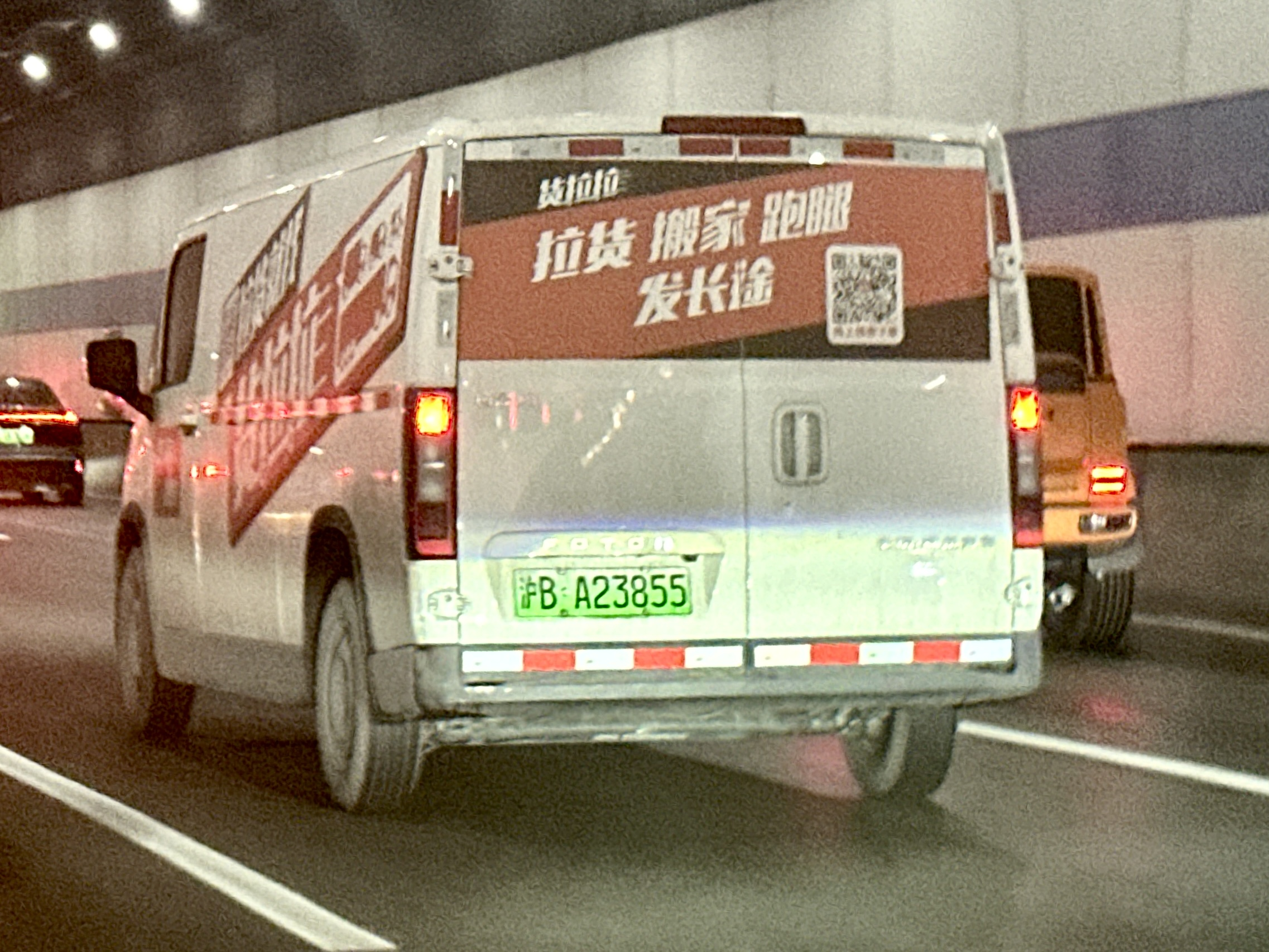
Rear view

Foton View T7

== Foton Cavan Lefu ==
The Foton Cavan Lefu is a rebadged variant of the View i series. In December 2024, the Cavan Auto (卡文汽车), a new energy commercial vehicle brand jointly owned by Foton Motor, Bosch, SinoHytec, and BAIC Capital, was launched. Cavan products are sold as a sub-brand of Foton, with the first product being the Lefu (乐福) van, unveiled alongside the Beacon, a concept heavy-duty truck.

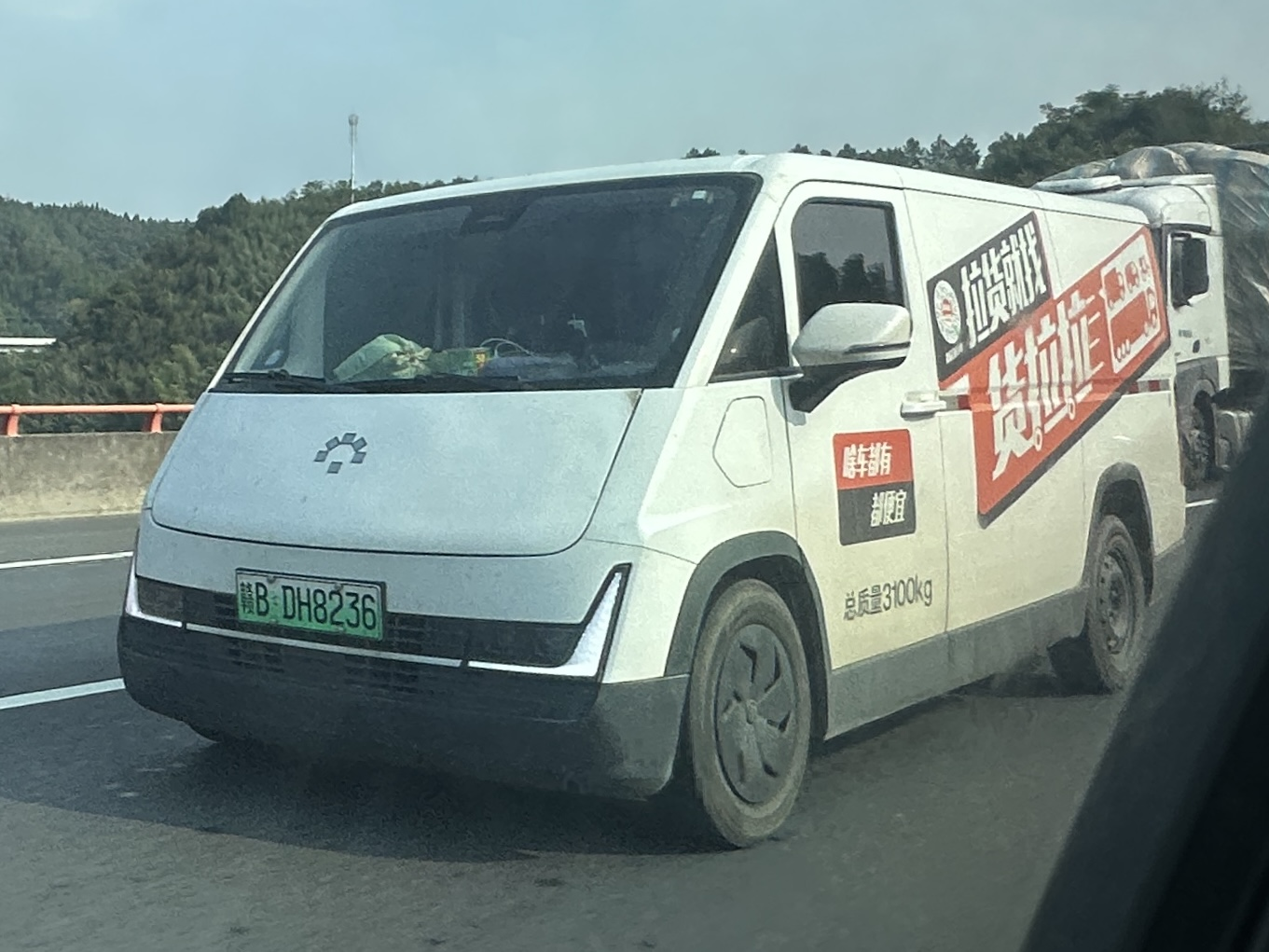
Foton Cavan Lefu

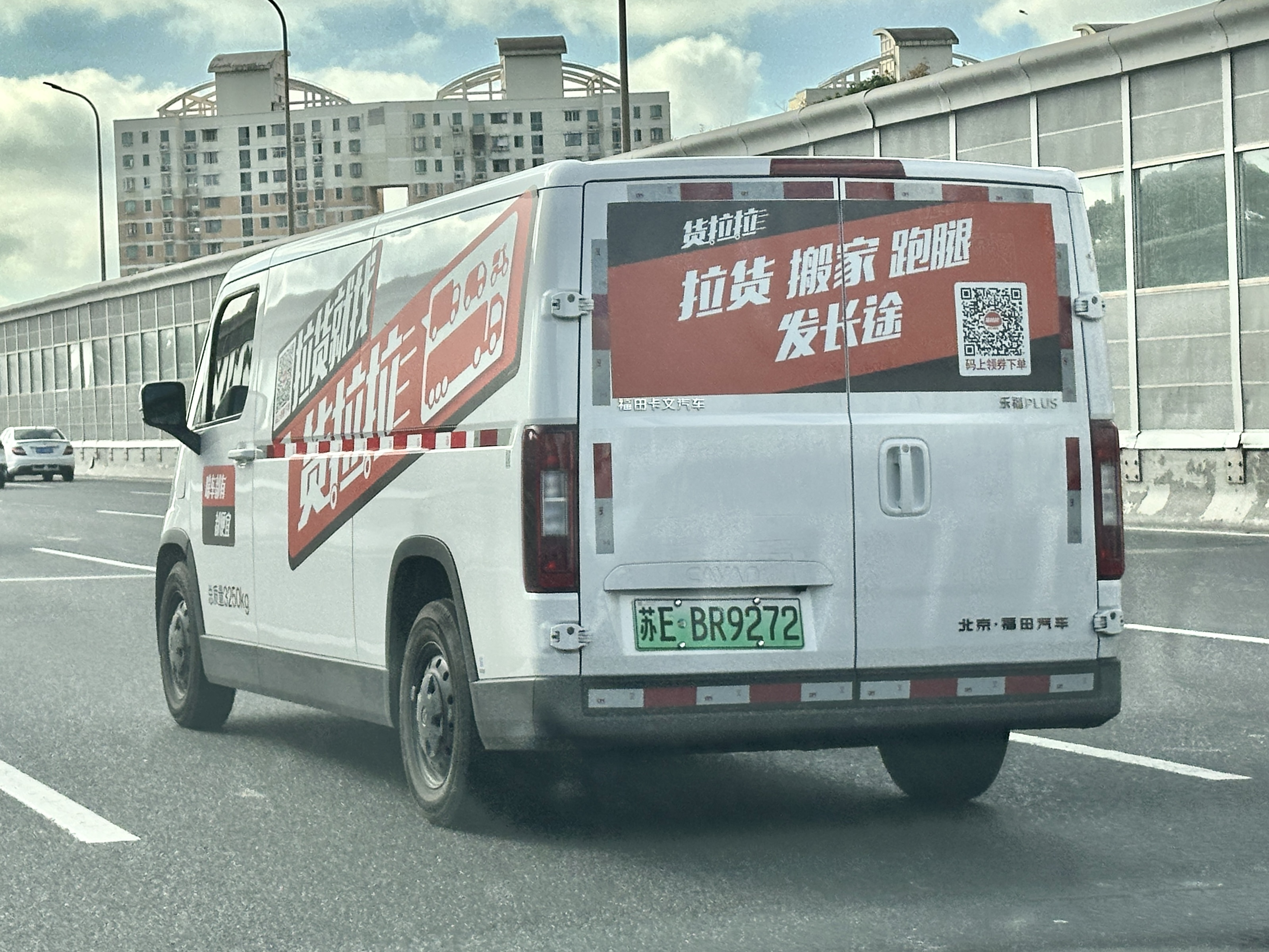
Rear view

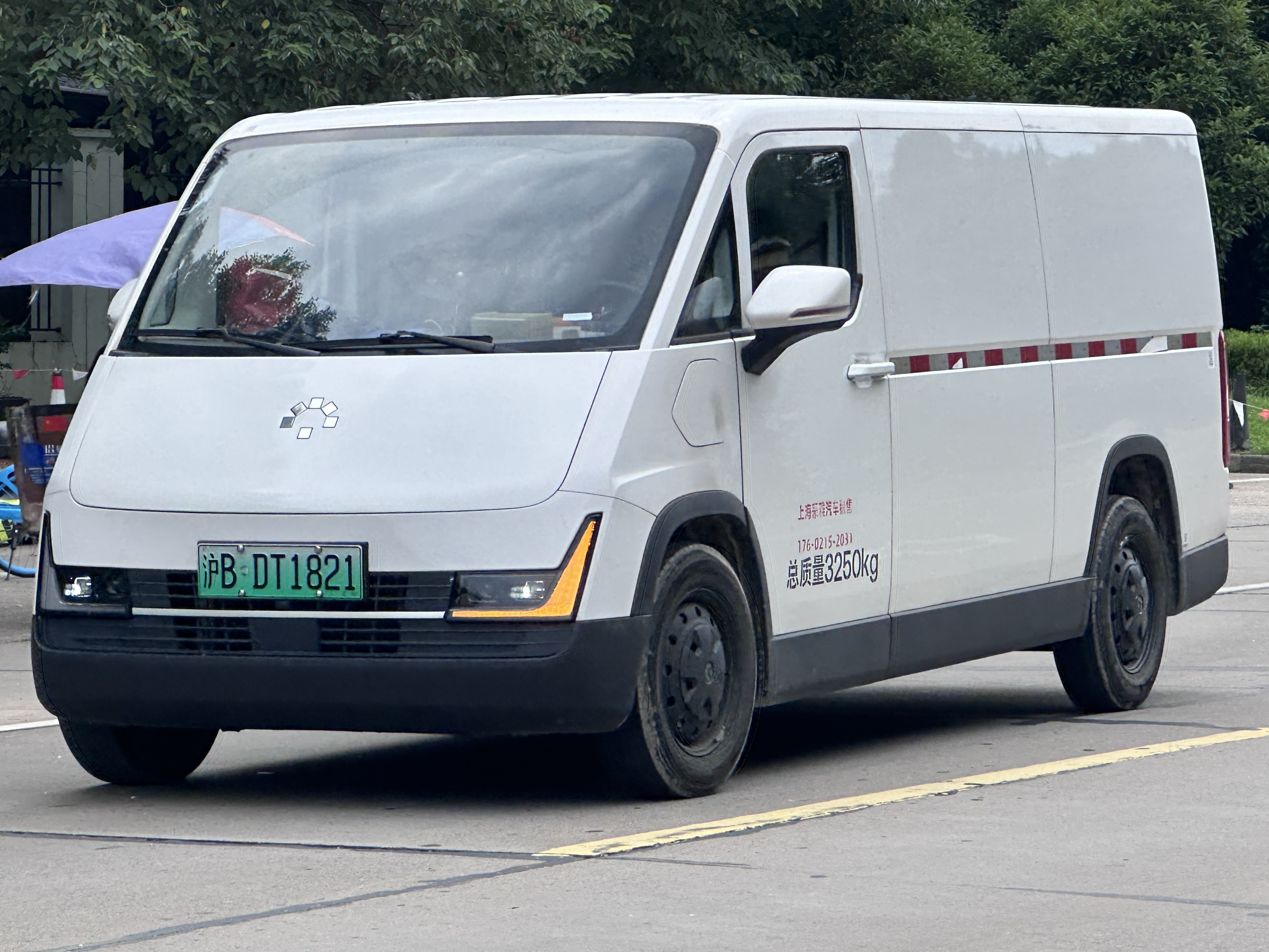
Foton Cavan Lefu Plus

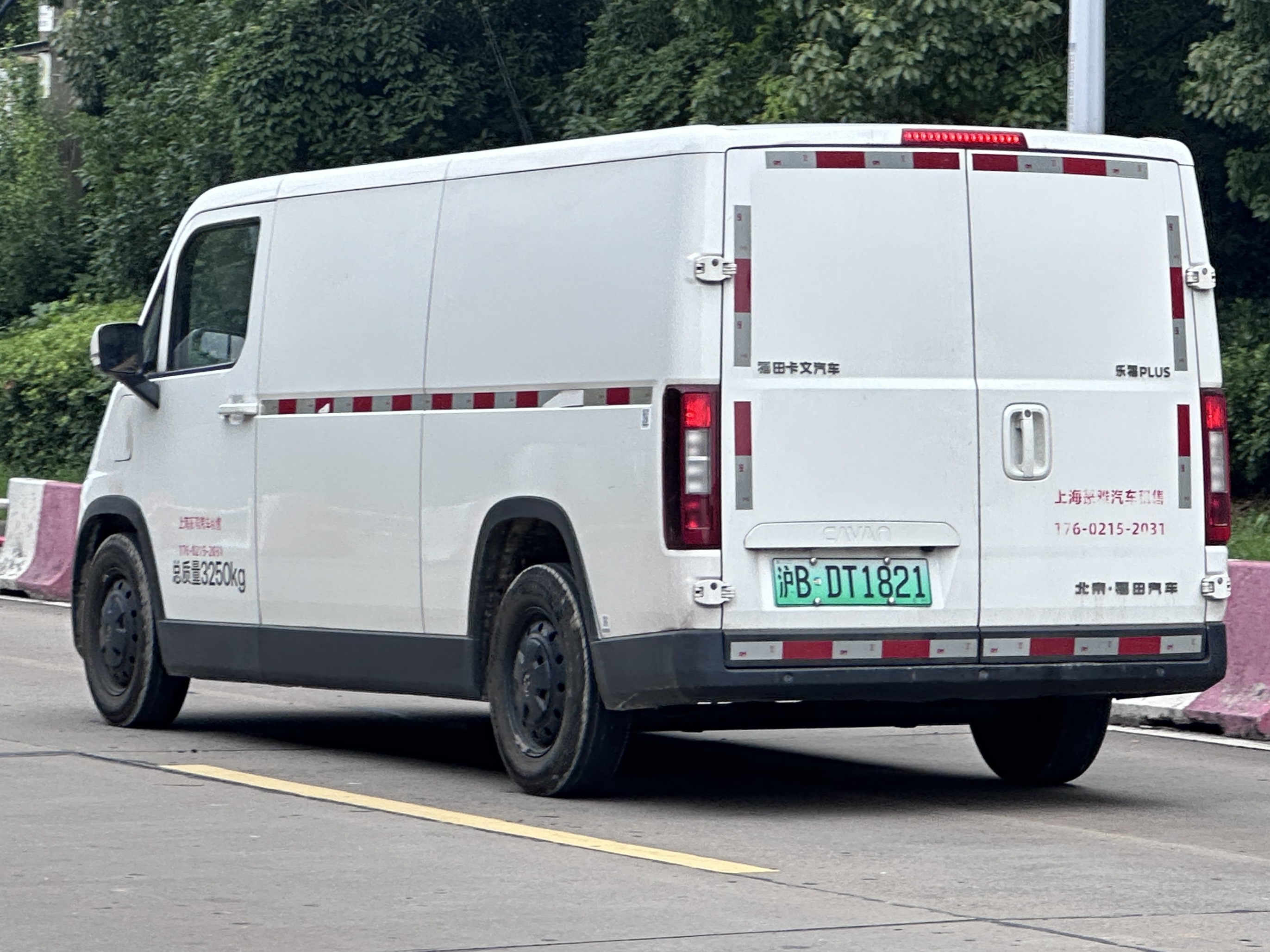
Rear view

Foton Cavan Lefu 350

Foton Cavan Lefu Max
