= XPeng G7 =

Battery electric mid-size crossover SUV

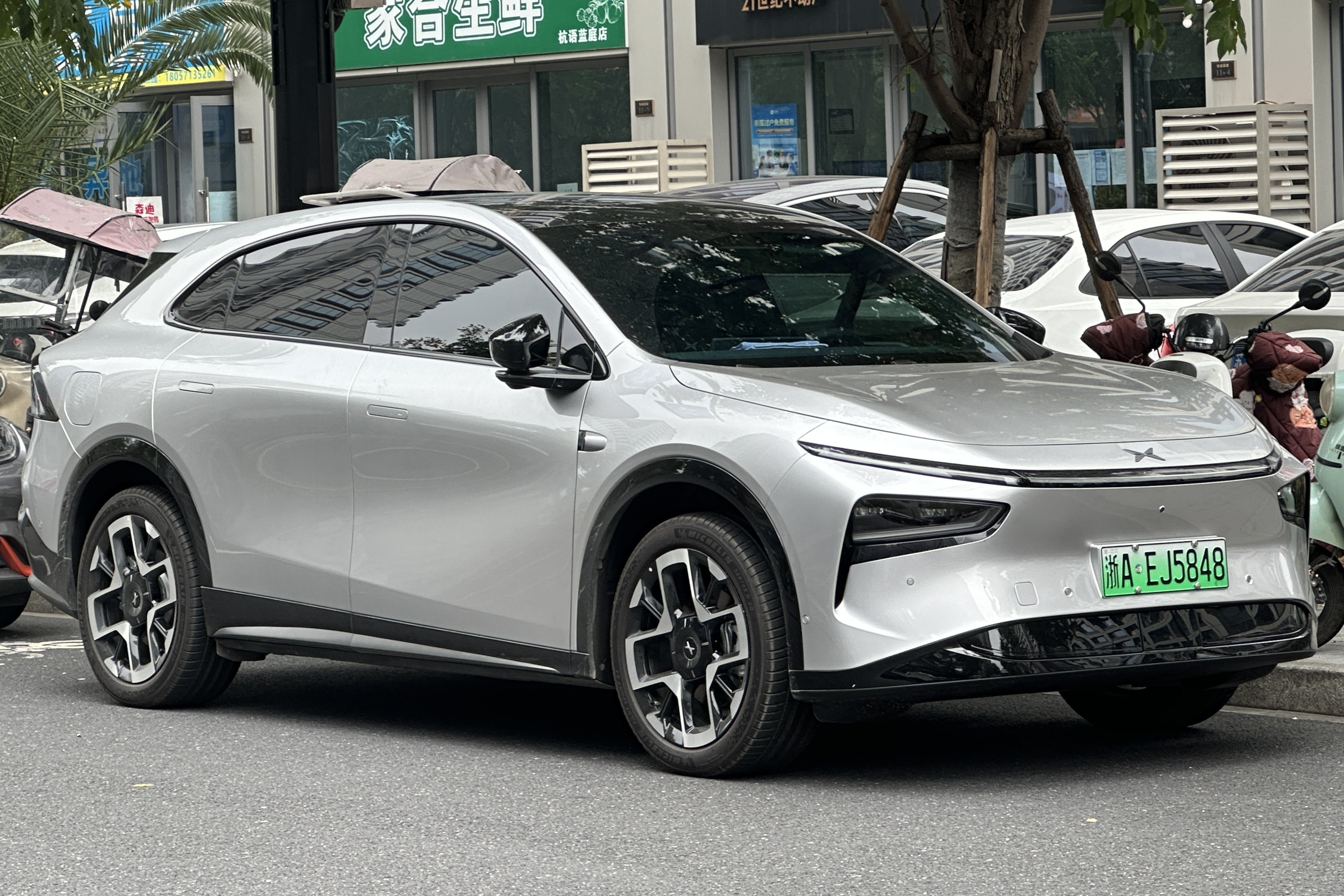

Overview
- Manufacturer: XPeng
- Model code: F01
- Production: July 2025 – present
- Assembly: China: Guangzhou, Guangdong

Body and chassis
- Class: Mid-size crossover SUV
- Body style: 5-door SUV
- Layout: Rear-motor, rear-wheel drive
- Platform: Smart Electric Platform Architecture (SEPA) 2.0
- Related: XPeng P7+

Powertrain
- Engine: Petrol range extender: 1.5 L Dong'an DAM15NTE turbo I4
- Electric motor: 218 kW TZ230XY01F30B permanent magnet synchronous
- Power output: 292 hp (218 kW; 296 PS)
- Hybrid drivetrain: Series hybrid range extender (EREV)
- Battery: 55.8 kWh LFP EVE Energy; 68.5 kWh LFP CALB; 80.8 kWh LFP CALB
- Range: 1,704 km (1,059 mi) (EREV, CLTC)
- Electric range: 430 km (267 mi) (EREV, CLTC); 577–702 km (359–436 mi) (EV, CLTC)
- Plug-in charging: DC: 5C

Dimensions
- Wheelbase: 2,890 mm (113.8 in)
- Length: 4,892 mm (192.6 in); 4,918 mm (193.6 in) (EREV)
- Width: 1,925 mm (75.8 in)
- Height: 1,655 mm (65.2 in)
- Kerb weight: 2,085–2,160 kg (4,597–4,762 lb)

The XPeng G7 (Chinese: 小鹏G7; pinyin: Xiǎopéng G7; stylized in italics) is a battery electric mid-size crossover SUV manufactured by Chinese electric car company XPeng. The G7 was unveiled in January 2025, and it was launched in June. It is the first vehicle to feature XPeng's self-developed Turing AI chips and AR-HUD system codeveloped with Huawei.

== History ==
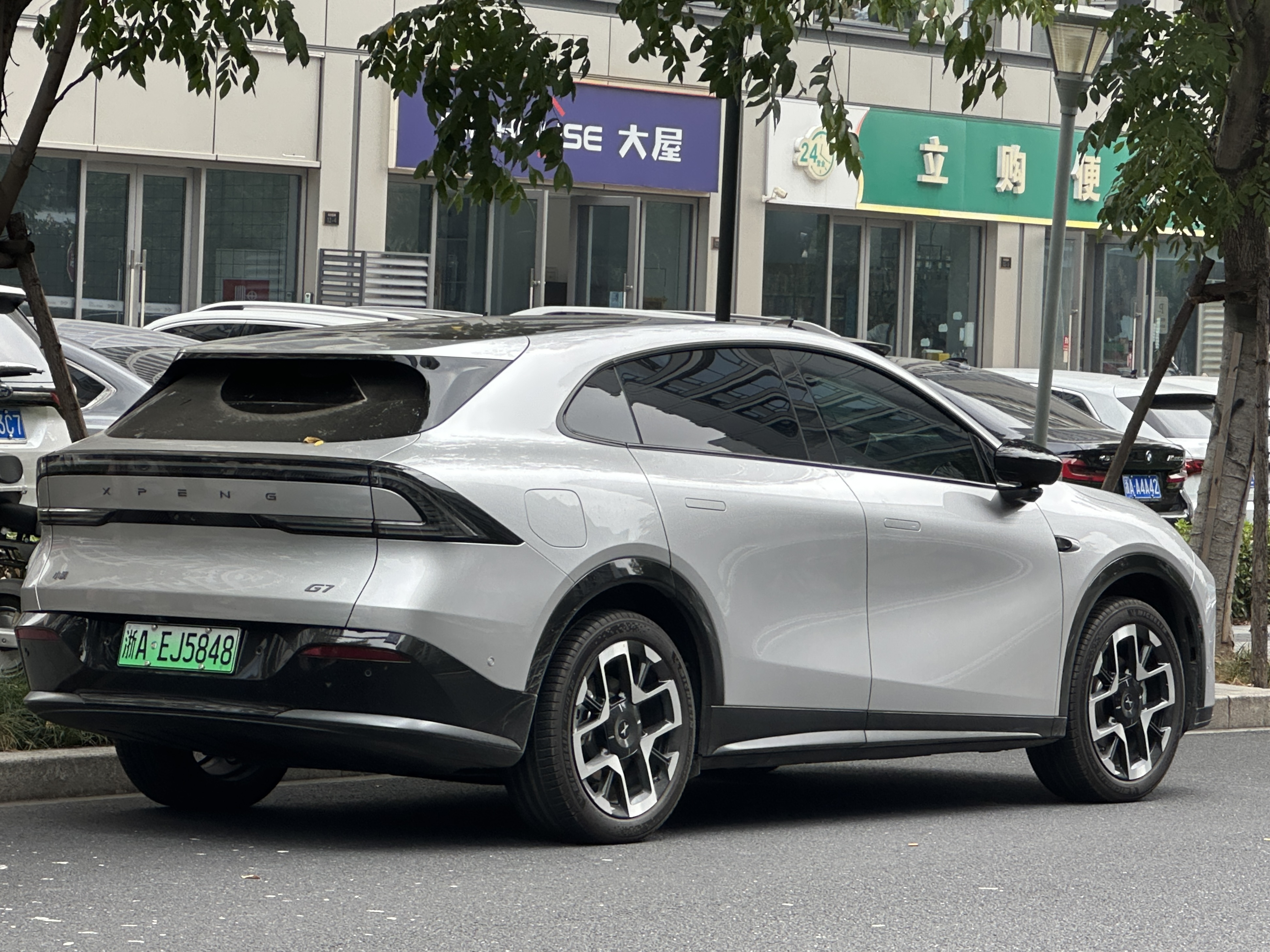
XPeng G7 rear

Plans for the G7 were first revealed in a product roadmap in August 2023, as a B+ segment SUV with at least 570 km (350 mi) of range scheduled to launch in Q3 2024. XPeng first revealed exterior pictures of the G7 on 9 January 2025, the same day basic specifications of the vehicle were revealed in MIIT listings.

On 7 June 2025, XPeng held an event detailing the company's new heads-up display made in collaboration with Huawei, which the company said will debut in the G7 the following week. On 11 June 2025, XPeng launched the G7 and opened pre-orders, with deliveries set to begin in the third quarter of 2025.

== Overview ==
The G7 is a mid-size five-seater crossover SUV, sharing its wheelbase with the smaller G6 and is 1 mm (0.039 in) longer than the flagship G9.

The G7 shares its 'second generation X-Face' design language with the P7+ sedan. The front features a split headlight design with light bar style daytime running lights and a headlight module that leads into an air curtain. The front and rear doors have frameless windows, flush door handles, and soft-close functionality. The C-shaped light bar style taillights and frameless side mirrors have integrated teal autonomous driving indicator lights. It is available in a choice of 18- or 20-inch wheel options and is available in six color options: Starry Grey, Crescent Silver, Nebula White, Dark Night Black, Cloud Beige, and Interstellar Green.

The interior adopts a minimalist design, with the dashboard only containing the steering wheel with column shifter, concealed air vents with wood accents, and a 15.6-inch central infotainment touchscreen. Instead of an instrument cluster display found on previous XPeng models, the G7 debuts the company's new 87-inch Light Pursuit Panoramic AR-HUD. It was developed in collaboration with Huawei XHUD and consists of their self-developed 1920×1080 LCoS display panel capable of 12,000 nits of brightness, 1800:1 contrast ratio, and 85% NTSC gamut coverage, along with firmware such as image stabilization algorithms and for accurately displaying AR elements based on vehicle ADAS sensor data. The system allows the navigation system to provide lane-level guidance in complex intersections and roundabouts, and allows the ADAS system to highlight vehicles, pedestrians, and lane markings in low visibility conditions. The center console has dual 50-watt active-cooled wireless charging pads, and an 8-inch control touchscreen for the rear passengers; the rear fold-down armrest also has a wireless charging pad of the same specification.

The seats are upholstered in Nappa leather and all have power adjustment and heating, ventilation, and 8-point massage functions. It is equipped with a 2.18 m^{2} (23.5 sq ft) panoramic sunroof, a 20-speaker 7.1.4 sound system, ambient lighting, 9-inch 1080p digital rearview mirror, and password-protected glovebox. The second row has access to folding seatback tables with integrated magnetic mounting points. The interior has wood and brushed metal accents, and is available in four color options: Mystic Blue, Warm Orange, Aura Grey, and Deep Space Grey.

The G7 has a 819 L (28.9 cu ft) rear cargo area, which expands to 2,277 L (80.4 cu ft) with the rear seats folded down; it also has a drainable frunk. All variants of the G7 have continuous damping control suspension.

The G7 is available with two ADAS systems, the Max and Ultra, both of which have sensor suites consisting of three mmWave radars and 11 cameras, notably lacking LiDAR sensors. The standard Max system uses two Nvidia Orin-X chips capable of 508 TOPS, while the Ultra system uses XPeng's first application of its self-developed Turing AI chips capable of 750 TOPS each for a total of 2,250 TOPS. The Turing AI chips are also responsible for running the cabin's infotainment systems, and XPeng claims the chips will enable the vehicle to support Level 3 autonomous driving, which is expected to be trialed in the second half of 2025.

=== 2026 update ===
On 8 January 2026, XPeng updated the G7 with a new range extender powertrain and minor adjustments. The front light bar has been made into a single uninterrupted segment, and a new Starry Purple exterior paint option and new wheel options have been added. The range extender version has a slightly longer front bumper with a larger lower grille and comes with a combined cabin and engine active noise reduction system. The infotainment system has been updated to the new Tianji AIOS 6.0 software, and the ADAS system has been updated to support AEB and AES functions at up to 130 km/h (81 mph).

== Powertrain ==
The G7 has a battery electric powertrain exclusively available in rear-wheel drive with two battery capacity options, and both have 800V power electronics capable of 5C charging from 10–80% in 12 minutes. It uses a 218 kW (292 hp; 296 PS) permanent magnet synchronous motor produced in-house which outputs 450 N⋅m (332 lb⋅ft) of torque, powered by either 68.5 or 80.8 kWh LFP batteries supplied by CALB.

In January 2026, XPeng launched a range extender variant of the G7, which uses the same rear-motor as the EV version. It is equipped with a 1.5-liter turbocharged inline-four petrol engine supplied by Dong'an Power which outputs 148 hp (110 kW; 150 PS) at 5,500 rpm and 220 N⋅m (162 lb⋅ft) of torque at 2,500–4,000 rpm and does not directly drive the wheels. It has a 55.8 kWh LFP battery supplied by EVE Energy and a 60 L (15.9 U.S. gal) fuel tank which gives it a pure electric CLTC range rating of 430 km (267 mi) and a combined range of 1,704 km (1,059 mi). Like the EV version, it is equipped with 800V SiC power electronics system which gives it 5C charging for 10–80% in 12 minutes.

Specifications
Variant	Battery		Power	Electric range		10–80% charge time	Top speed	Kerb weight
Variant	Type	Pack weight	Power	WLTP	CLTC	10–80% charge time	Top speed	Kerb weight
EREV	55.8 kWh LFP EVE Energy	397.5 kg (876 lb)	218 kW (292 hp; 296 PS)	325 km (202 mi)	430 km (267 mi)	12 min	202 km/h (126 mph)	2,245–2,255 kg (4,949–4,971 lb)
Standard Range	68.5 kWh LFP CALB	560 kg (1,235 lb)	218 kW (292 hp; 296 PS)	—	577–602 km (359–374 mi)	12 min	202 km/h (126 mph)	2,085–2,100 kg (4,597–4,630 lb)
Long Range	80.8 kWh LFP CALB	631 kg (1,391 lb)	218 kW (292 hp; 296 PS)	—	677–702 km (421–436 mi)	12 min	202 km/h (126 mph)	2,145–2,160 kg (4,729–4,762 lb)

== Sales ==
After opening on 11 June 2025, XPeng received 10,000 pre-orders for the G7 within 46 minutes. The G7 reached the 10,000 deliveries milestone on 13 August 2025, 41 days after its launch.

Year	EV	EREV	China
2025	23,680	364	24,044
