= XPeng P7+ =

Electric executive sedan

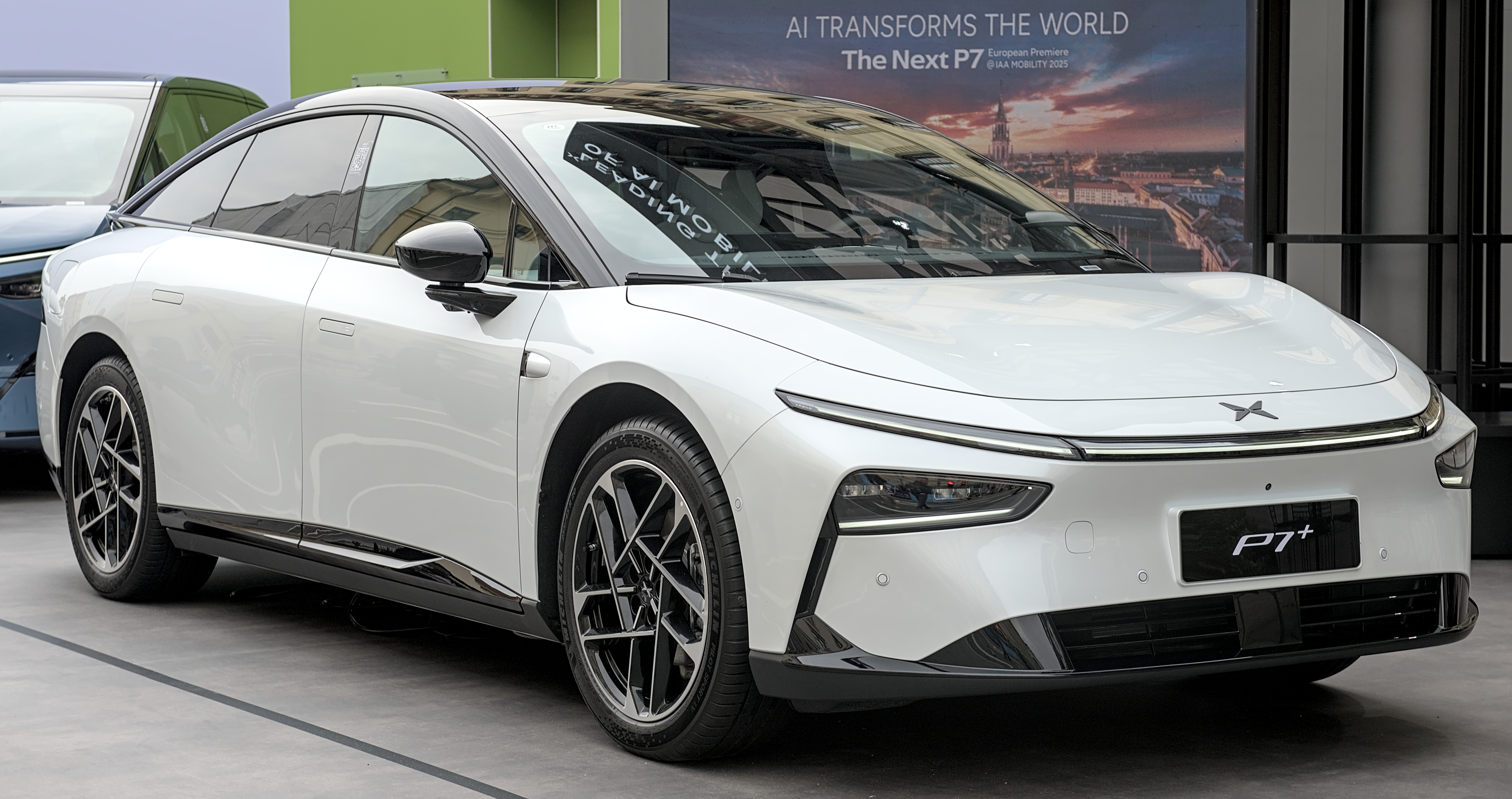

Overview
- Manufacturer: XPeng
- Model code: F57 (Note: The facelifted P7+ uses the model code F57aES.)
- Production: 2024–present
- Assembly: China: Guangzhou, Guangdong; Austria: Graz (Magna Steyr)

Body and chassis
- Class: Executive car (E)
- Body style: 5-door liftback sedan
- Layout: Battery electric: Rear-motor, rear-wheel-drive; Range-extended EV: Front-engine, rear-motor, rear-wheel-drive
- Platform: SEPA 2.0
- Related: XPeng P7

Powertrain
- Engine: Petrol range extender: 1.5 L HDA 4G15T turbo I4
- Electric motor: Permanent magnet synchronous
- Power output: 241–308 hp (180–230 kW; 244–312 PS)
- Transmission: Single-speed gear reduction
- Hybrid drivetrain: Kunpeng Super Electric System (Series hybrid/range extender/plug-in hybrid)
- Battery: 49.2 kWh LFP Eve Energy; 60.7 kWh LFP Eve Energy; 61.7 kWh LFP Eve Energy; 74.9 kWh LFP Eve Energy; 76.3 kWh LFP Eve Energy
- Range: 1,550 km (963 mi) (EREV, CLTC)
- Electric range: 325 km (202 mi) (EREV, WLTP); 430 km (267 mi) (EREV, CLTC); 455–530 km (283–329 mi) (EV, WLTP); 602–725 km (374–450 mi) (EV, CLTC)

Dimensions
- Wheelbase: 3,000 mm (120 in)
- Length: Pre-facelift: 5,056 mm (199.1 in); Facelift: 5,071 mm (199.6 in)
- Width: 1,937 mm (76.3 in)
- Height: 1,512 mm (59.5 in)
- Curb weight: 1,967–2,160 kg (4,336–4,762 lb)

The XPeng P7+ (Chinese: 小鹏P7+; pinyin: Xiǎopéng P7+; stylized with a superscript as P7^{+}) is a battery electric executive car manufactured by Chinese electric car company XPeng, which was revealed in China on October 10, 2024 and internationally at the Paris Motor Show four days later. It features the first implementation of XPeng's LiDAR-less 'vision only' autonomous driving system.

== Overview ==
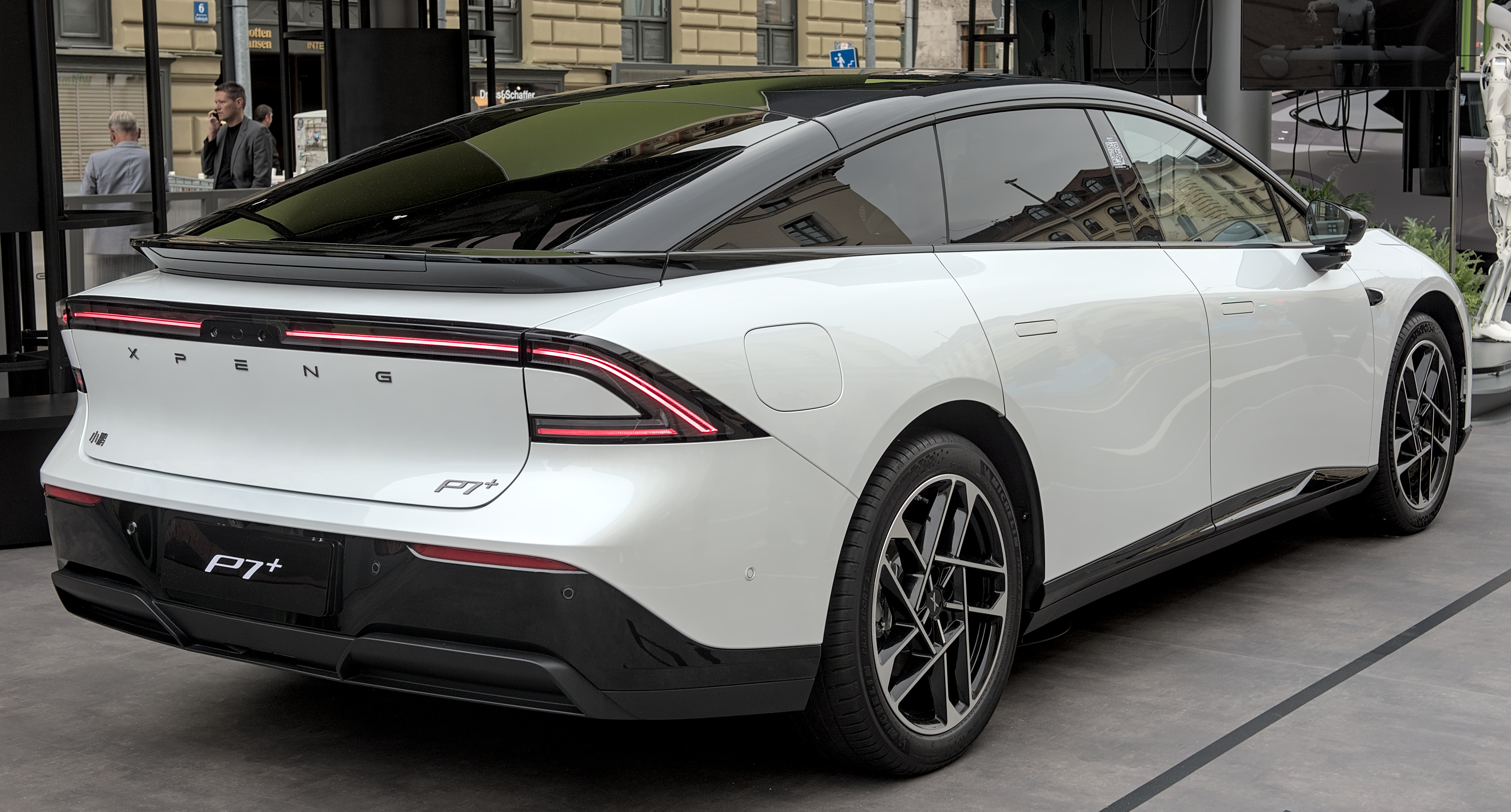
Rear view

The P7+ is designed to be a larger, cheaper version of the XPeng P7i, which it will be sold alongside rather than replace. It significantly increases the spaciousness of the second row, which was a significant criticism of the P7 series.

Weeks before its public reveal, P7+ units were spotted being stockpiled outside of the XPeng Guangzhou factory, and some were spotted while being shipped to showrooms as display models and test drive units. The P7+ made its Chinese debut on October 10, 2024 and its international debut at the Paris Motor Show on October 14, which is also when Chinese market pre-orders opened. The starting price of the P7+ at the pre-sale was CN¥ 209,800 (US$29,600). By October 18, the first batch of production P7+ units had been produced and were in transit to showrooms. Deliveries began in November, and production capacity had been increased three times by early December to meet demand, as the model achieved the 10,000 and 20,000 delivery milestones within one and two months of launch, respectively. Battery supplier Eve Energy initially allocated three battery cell production lines to supply the P7+, which was quickly increased to four lines in November due to the model's high demand, and two additional lines will be allocated in January 2025.

At launch, the P7+ will be available in two versions: Long Range Max, and Ultra Long Range Max. A special Limited Edition Max model, based on the Ultra Long Range trim with different 20-inch wheels, is produced only 500 units. Unlike previous XPeng models, all trim levels have the same autonomous driving capabilities.

The facelifted P7+ was launched on January 8, 2026, in China and January 9 in Brussels, Belgium for global markets, marking its entry into 36 new markets. It features a new range-extender powertrain option and a new ADAS system using self-developed chips capable of up to 2250 TOPS. To assist its entry into the European market, it started production at the Magna Steyr plant in Graz, Austria, with trial production completing on January 5, 2026.

== Design and technology ==
Despite the similar name to the P7, the P7+ rides on the larger SEPA 2.0 platform shared with the G6. While the wheelbase is about the same as the P7, the overall length of the car is 168 mm (6.6 in) longer. The A-pillar has been moved forward closer to the front wheels, and the C-pillar moved rearward, increasing the length of the cabin. The rear hatch features a raised 'double-decker' fastback design, allowing for increased rear passenger headroom and taller cargo area while maintaining low aerodynamic drag. These changes allow for increased interior space, a significant criticism of the P7. The P7+ is available in five exterior paint colors: New Moon Silver, Nebula White, Midnight Black, Twilight Purple, and Cloud Beige.

The chassis uses a double wishbone suspension at the front and a multilink independent suspension at the rear. The P7+ has a drag coefficient of 0.206, helped by the use of active grille shutters.

=== Autonomous driving system ===
The P7+ features XPeng's first implementation of a 'vision only' autonomous driving system. Named AI Hawk, it uses two Nvidia Orin X chips providing 508 TOPS of compute, along with a series of eleven cameras, three mmWave radars, and twelve ultrasonic sensors, but notably lacks LiDAR in its sensor suite unlike the P7i. It uses the industry's first implementation of single-pixel LOFIC (lateral overflow integration capacitor) camera sensors, which are better able to deal with high contrast lighting scenarios such as backlighting or headlight glare during nighttime; these sensors are used in the front and rear low-field-of-view cameras.

=== Interior ===
The P7+ has a near buttonless dashboard, with nearly all controls placed in the 15.6-inch center infotainment touchscreen; the 10.25-inch digital instrument panel is controlled by two sets of button and scroll controls mounted on the two-spoke steering wheel, which are powered by a Qualcomm Snapdragon 8295 SoC. Ahead of the center console armrest is a set of two cupholders and dual ventilated wireless charging pads.

On the rear of the center console is a pair of vents and a touchscreen for the rear passengers. The touchscreen houses controls for the seats' heating, ventilation, and massage functions, controls for the rear climate control zone, and media controls with the ability to play videos. The front seatbacks contain a folding tray table similar to airline seats, and there are controls to move the front passenger seat forward to provide more legroom.

Both the front and rear seats have heated, ventilated, and massaging seats available. The driver's seat has up to 12-way power seat adjustments, and the rear seatbacks can be power reclined by up to 10 degrees. The P7+ has a front seating space of 956 mm (37.6 in) and 994 mm (39.1 in) in the rear, with 157 mm (6.2 in) of knee room.

The roof is spanned by a tinted 2.1-square-metre (23 sq ft) panoramic sunroof that lacks a sunshade. The XPeng-developed sound system consists of twenty Dynaudio-sourced speakers imported from Germany in a 7.1.4 surround sound configuration. It includes a speaker integrated into the driver's seat headrest which will provide audio from navigation prompts and phone calls without interrupting audio for the rest of the cabin.

The P7+ has a power rear liftgate which reveals a trunk with 725 liters (192 U.S. gal) of space, which expands to 2,221 liters (587 U.S. gal) with the rear seats folded down. It also has an underfloor compartment, but lacks a frunk despite having an opening hood.

=== 2025 update ===
At Auto Shanghai 2025 in April, XPeng revealed the 2025 update for the P7+. The biggest change is to the Ultra Long Range Flagship trim, which has been updated with a new battery to support 5C charging speeds to charge from 10‍–‍80% in 12 minutes. The flagship trim also now comes with continuous damping control and new hydraulic bushings, and has new 20-inch wheel options. The two other trims including the older Ultra Long Range continue unchanged.

=== Facelift (2026) ===
The facelifted version of the P7+ was announced on December 29, 2025. It launched on January 8, 2026 as a global model, expanding outside of the Chinese market for the first time to 36 new markets. XPeng says that the facelift features 104 upgrades including 36% of the powertrain components. Headlining new features include a new range-extender powertrain option and an updated semi-autonomous driving system featuring self-developed computing hardware capable of up to 2250 TOPS.

Compared to the pre-facelifted version, the facelift is 15 mm (0.59 in) longer and features active grille shutters. It uses a single full-width light strip on the front compared to the 3 light strip segments of the pre-facelift version and new chrome-plated trim. It features teal colored autonomous driving indicator lights in the taillight. Changes to the rear include modified taillight design and body color painted lower bumper. It is available with new wheel options and a new Starry Blue paint option. The continuous damping control suspension now comes standard on all models.

The dashboard features a smaller 8.8-inch instrument panel to make space for a new 29-inch augmented-reality heads-up display. The interior now features faux wood trim, metallic-look accent switchgear using PVD coatings, concealed air vents, and an electronic password-protected glovebox. XPeng claims there were 62 changes made to improve NVH, including active road and engine noise cancellation, dual-glazed front windows, and soft-close doors, amounting to 26 dB of total noise reduction. Additional improvements include an upgraded ambient lighting system, microsuede lining on the dual-50W wireless charging pads, and a microfiber headliner. The front seat cushions have been extended by 15 mm (0.59 in), and XPeng says the seat's ventilation and massaging functions are 80% and 46% stronger, respectively, and the front passenger seat has a 'zero-gravity' recline mode. There are two new interior color options: Morning Mist Blue and Soft Light Purple with rose gold accents. XPeng says the HVAC system, which has been upgraded with a heat pump, is 30–50% more efficient in the spring and autumn seasons and increases range by 15% in the winter.

The infotainment system now uses a Mediatek MT8676 SoC which runs the newly updated AIOS 6.0 operating system. New features include 3D lane-level navigation capable of displaying accurate lane and building information nationwide in China, an optional multi-turn natural language voice command system powered by a VLM model, Vivo smartphone integration, and a new gaming center powered by Tencent cloud gaming. Additionally, the ADAS system has been upgraded to use XPeng's self-developed Turing chip, with the base model receiving a single chip with 750 TOPS to power its basic 'Max' L2 ADAS system. With the 'Ultra SE' upgrade option, the ADAS system is upgraded with an additional Turing chip for 1500 TOPS and gains access to XPeng's second generation VLA ADAS system. With the 'Ultra' option, the vehicle is equipped with yet another Turing chip for a total of three chips collectively capable of 2250 TOPS, with the third chip dedicated to powering the VLM voice command system.

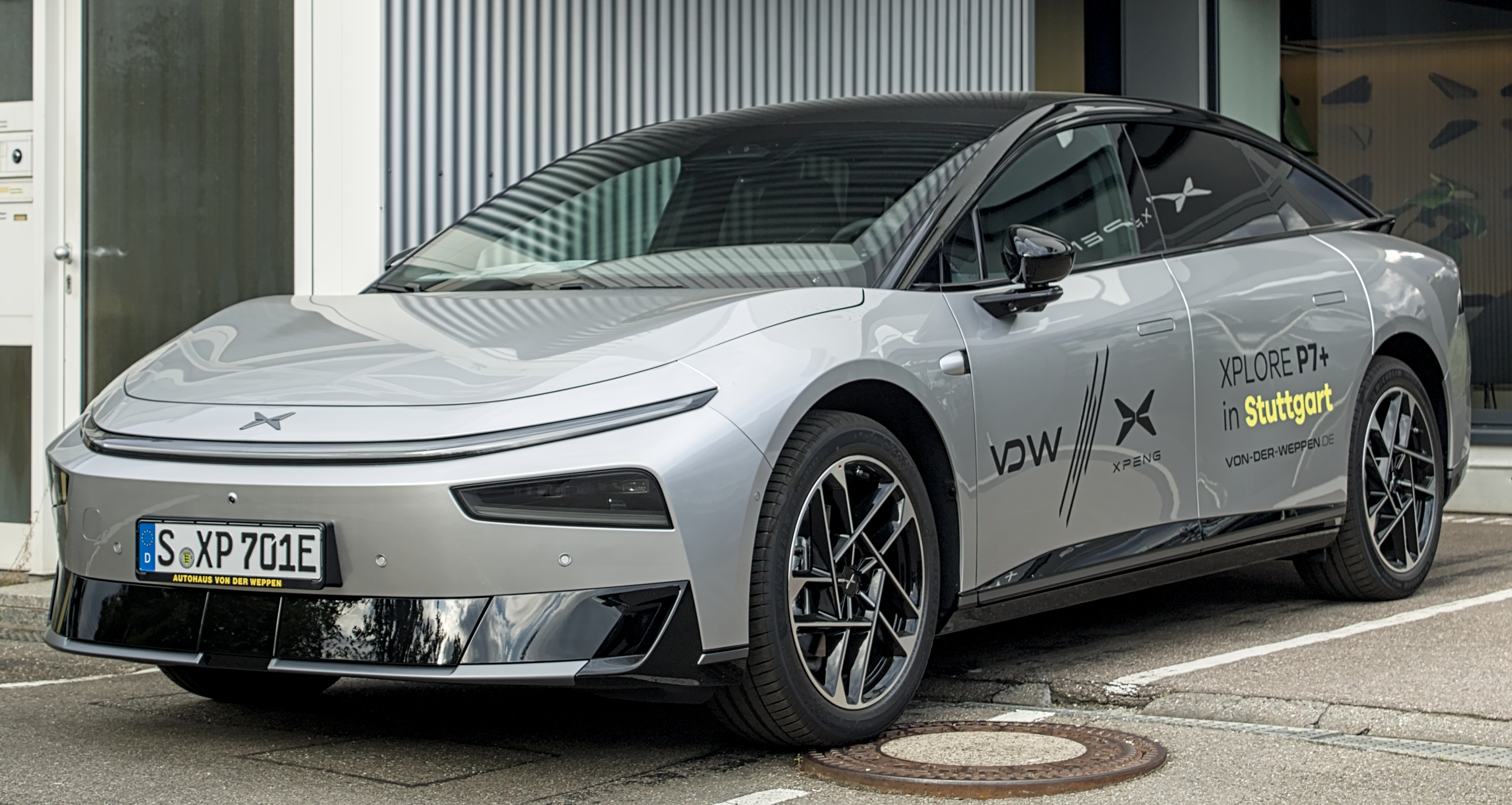
Front view

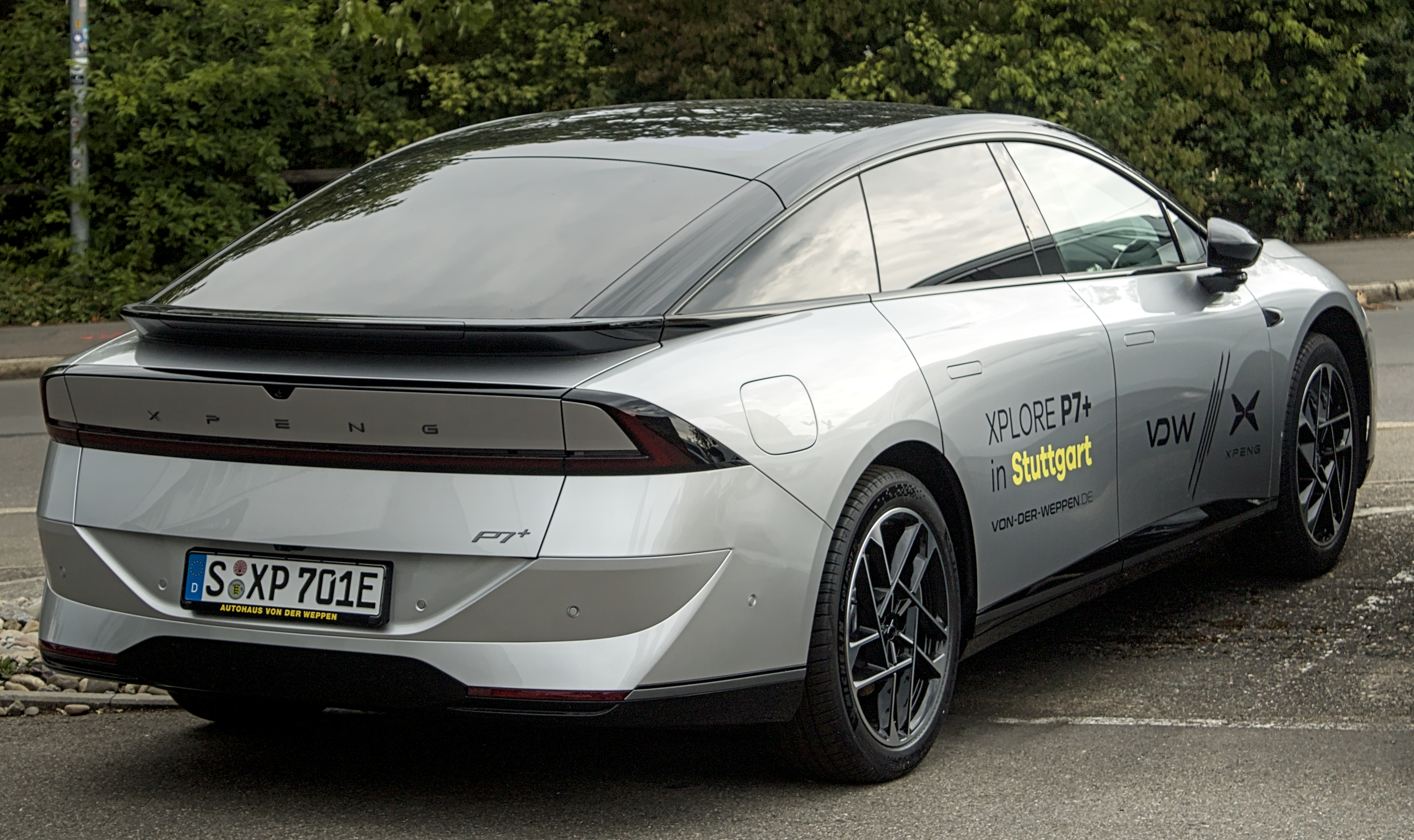
Rear view

== Powertrain ==
The P7+ was originally available exclusively with a battery electric powertrain, with a range-extender powertrain option added for the 2026 facelift; both are only available with rear-wheel drive.

=== Battery electric ===
At launch, the P7+ had a choice of two lithium iron phosphate batteries of either 60.7 kWh or 76.3 kWh capacities, sourced from Eve Power. The battery packs have a height of 109 mm (4.3 in), which XPeng claims are the world's thinnest. Both batteries use an 800 V electrical platform using silicon carbide power electronics, and support up to 3C charging resulting in a claimed 30–80% charge time of 16 minutes. The P7+ comes with a single 241 hp (180 kW; 244 PS) motor as standard, with higher models receiving a single 308 hp (230 kW; 312 PS) unit, both produced by XPeng in Wuhan. It has a top speed of 200 kilometres per hour (124 mph).

An OTA update expected to release in December 2024 will increase the maximum range of the P7+ from 602 to 615 km (374 to 382 mi) for the smaller battery, and from 710 to 725 km (441 to 450 mi) for the larger pack.

The updated Flagship trim in 2025 comes with a Eve Energy-supplied 74.9 kWh LFP battery pack capable of 5C charging from 10–80% within 12 minutes, and a maximum range of 685 km (426 mi).

For the 2026 facelift, the smaller battery option was upgraded to 61.7 kWh Eve-Energy supplied LFP pack now capable of 5C charging from 10–80% within 12 minutes while retaining the same 615 km (382 mi) of CLTC range.

=== Range extender ===
The P7+ received a range extender powertrain option in early 2026, marketed by XPeng as the Kunpeng Super Range Extender system. It is equipped with a 1.5-liter turbocharged inline-four petrol engine with a peak power of 148 hp (110 kW; 150 PS) and generates up to 114 hp (85 kW; 116 PS), and does not mechanically drive the wheels. The vehicle is driven by a 241 hp (180 kW; 244 PS) electric motor, powered by an Eve Energy-supplied 49.2 kWh LFP battery pack, allowing for a pure electric range of 325 km (202 mi) on the WLTP cycle or 430 km (267 mi) on the CLTC cycle, and a total combined range of 1,550 km (963 mi) (CLTC). The 800-volt silicon carbide power electronics allow it to charge from 10–80% in 12 minutes, or a claimed 277 km (172 mi) of range in 10 minutes. XPeng says the silicon carbide power electronics have 99% peak efficiency, and the overall powertrain efficiency is 92.5%. XPeng claims the powertrain can maintain a speed of 150 km/h (93 mph) with the battery fully depleted.

Powertrains
Model	Year	Battery	Power	Torque	EV range		10‍–‍80% charge time	0–100 km/h (62 mph) time	Top speed	Kerb weight
Model	Year	Battery	Power	Torque	WLTP	CLTC	10‍–‍80% charge time	0–100 km/h (62 mph) time	Top speed	Kerb weight
Long Range	2024–2025	60.7 kWh LFP	180 kW (241 hp; 245 PS)	450 N⋅m (332 lb⋅ft)	—	602–615 km (374–382 mi)	20 mins	6.8 s	200 km/h (124 mph)	1,967 kg (4,336 lb)
Ultra Long Range	2024–2025	76.3 kWh LFP	230 kW (308 hp; 313 PS)	450 N⋅m (332 lb⋅ft)	—	685–715 km (426–444 mi)	20 mins	5.9 s	200 km/h (124 mph)	2,073 kg (4,570 lb)
Ultra Long Range Flagship	2025	74.9 kWh LFP	230 kW (308 hp; 313 PS)	450 N⋅m (332 lb⋅ft)	—	685 km (426 mi)	12 mins	5.9 s	200 km/h (124 mph)	2,084 kg (4,594 lb)
430 EREV	2026–	49.2 kWh LFP	180 kW (241 hp; 245 PS)	450 N⋅m (332 lb⋅ft)	325 km (202 mi)	430 km (267 mi)	12 mins	6.9 s	200 km/h (124 mph)	2,160 kg (4,762 lb)
615 EV	2026–	61.7 kWh LFP	180 kW (241 hp; 245 PS)	450 N⋅m (332 lb⋅ft)	455 km (283 mi)	615 km (382 mi)	12 mins	6.9 s	200 km/h (124 mph)	2,015 kg (4,442 lb)
725 EV	2026–	74.9 kWh LFP	230 kW (308 hp; 313 PS)	450 N⋅m (332 lb⋅ft)	530 km (329 mi)	725 km (450 mi)	12 mins	5.9 s	200 km/h (124 mph)	2,105 kg (4,641 lb)

== Safety ==
C-NCAP test results 2025 XPeng P7+ Max Long Range
Category		%
Overall:	5 /5 stars	88.1%
Occupant protection:		93.08%
Vulnerable road users:		77.99%
Active safety:		87.51%

== Sales ==
At launch in China, customers could put down a refundable CN¥ 99 (approximately US$14) pre-order deposit which would provide a CN¥ 3,000 (approximately US$420) total purchase discount, leading to 30,000 pre-orders only 1 hour and 48 minutes after opening. XPeng later announced that there were 31,528 firm orders during the November 7 launch day, breaking the brand's record. XPeng chairman He Xiaopeng said on social media that over 10,000 firm orders for the P7+ were placed within 12 minutes after opening.

On November 28, 2024 at a celebratory ceremony, XPeng announced that they have produced the 10,000th P7+ 20 days after its launch earlier that month on the 7th; deliveries began on November 11. Weeks later on December 11, Xpeng announced that it delivered their 10,000th P7+. On January 10, 2025 Xpeng announced that it delivered the 20,000th P7+. XPeng announced that it had produced the 50,000th P7+ on April 28, 2025. On January 9, 2026, XPeng announced that it had produced the 100,000th P7+, coinciding with the launch of the facelift version.

Year	China		
Year	EV	EREV	Total
2024	17,507	—	17,507
2025	75,102	325	75,427
