= EVE Energy =

Chinese lithium battery manufacturer

EVE Energy Company, Limited
- Trade name: EVE Energy
- Native name: 亿纬动力
- Traded as: SZSE: 300014; CSI A100
- Industry: Electric batteries
- Founded: 2001; 25 years ago
- Founder: Liu Jincheng
- Headquarters: Huizhou, Guangdong, China
- Website: www.evebattery.com/en

EVE Energy Co., Ltd. (Mandarin: 亿纬动力; pinyin: yìwěi dònglì) is a Chinese battery manufacturing company founded by Liu Jincheng in 2001 that specializes in the manufacturing of lithium-ion batteries for energy storage systems and electric vehicles. Its headquarters are located in Huizhou, Guangdong, and it was first listed on the Shenzhen Stock Exchange's ChiNext subsidiary in 2009. It is considered to be a Tier-1 battery supplier, and is the third largest energy storage battery cell maker in the world as of 2023. According to a study done by SNE Research in 2024, Eve Energy was the 9th largest electric vehicle battery maker worldwide with 2.3% market share, which it maintained from 2023.

== Overview ==
Eve Energy has regional subsidiaries in Singapore and Germany.

On June 10, 2021, Eve Energy announced that was expanding two of its battery plants by 92.5GWh. Its facility in Jingzhou, Hubei which makes cylindrical format LFP batteries for small device applications such as power tools, would be expanded by 82.5 GWh from 23 GWh, for a total of 105.5 GWh annual capacity. It also announced that it was investing CN¥ 3 billion (US$470 million) into building a 10GWh battery plant located in Qidong, Jiangsu which will be completed within three years. The facility will be built in collaboration with energy meter producer Jiangsu Linyang Energy, and Eve Energy will hold a 65 percent stake in the factory.

On September 27, 2022, Eve Energy announced that it invested CN¥ 800 million (US$111 million) to acquire stakes in two battery material supply companies. It now holds a 20 percent stake Shandong Ruifu Lithium Industry, a lithium carbonate and lithium hydrate producer. It also has a 40 percent stake in BTR Sichuan New Material Technology, a subsidiary of BTR New Material Group. BTR will construct an anode material plant in Yibin, Sichuan with an annual capacity of 10 kilotons in collaboration with Eve Energy, which will finish in the first half of 2024.

In September 2022, Eve Energy announced it will invest CN¥ 10 billion to build a new battery plant in the automobile manufacturing hub of Shenyang, Liaoning. The first phase will cost CN¥ 5 billion and have an annual capacity of 20 GWh and will produce batteries for both energy storage and power supply applications.

On January 18, 2023, Eve Energy announced it would invest CN¥ 15.5 billion (US$2.3 billion) to build two new Chinese lithium battery factories in Jianyang, Sichuan and Qujing, Yunnan, with a combined annual capacity of 43 GWh. The Jianyang facility will have an annual capacity of 20 GWh and will receive CN¥ 10 billion (US$1.5 billion) of investment. It will take two years to build, but the construction start date will vary based on market conditions.

On January 29, 2024, Eve Energy formally launched global operations by announcing the completion of seven regional headquarters. The regional offices are for Beijing, South China, Central China, Southwest China, Northeast China, Asia-Pacific and Southeast Asia. In addition, regional headquarters for Northwest China, the Americas, and Oceania are expected to open later in the year, while an office in Taipei, Taiwan has already opened.

On September 13, 2024, Eve Energy's American subsidiary EVE ENERGY US Holding LLC launched its US regional headquarters in California.

In November 2024 Eve Energy signed an agreement with Enjie Tech and Senior Tech to supply battery separators to its Southeast Asia and Europe branches. The deal with Yuxi-based Enjie Tech involves the purchase of at least 3 billion m^{2} of battery separator over a seven-year period. The contract with the Singaporean subsidiary of Senior Tech includes the purchase of a minimum of 2 billion m^{2} of battery separator over a six-year period.

In December 2024, Eve Energy announced that it had signed a supply agreement with an American customer, which was later revealed to be Tesla. The agreement is for a supply of cells for use in energy storage systems from Eve Energy's Malaysian division and is expected to begin in 2026. The deal makes Eve Energy Tesla's sixth battery supplier, and its third supplier of cells for use in battery energy storage systems.

On June 9, 2025, Eve Energy announced that it plans to list on the Hong Kong Stock Exchange and issue H shares, after its board approved the proposal to do so on June 7. In June 2026, the US Department of Defense added EVE Energy to a list of Chinese military-linked companies.

== Facilities ==
=== Jingmen, Hubei ===
In June 2021, Eve Energy announced a phased expansion plan of its facilities located in the Jingmen High-Tech Industrial Zone, located in Jingmen, Hubei. At the time, 11 GWh was already operational, another 11 GWh was already under construction, and 82.5 GWh was planned to be built in phases, for a total of 105.5 GWh of annual capacity. At the time, the facility made NMC batteries for use device applications such as power tools.

On July 22, 2021, the construction of the first expansion phase was announced, which consists of five lithium battery production lines for a projected annual capacity of 12.2 GWh in a CN¥ 2.45 billion (US$380 million) investment. The production lines will produce cylindrical LFP and prismatic NMC battery cells.

In early August 2021, Eve Energy announced that it will form a joint venture with Yunnan Energy New Material, a major battery separator film supplier. The joint venture will invest CN¥ 5.2 billion (US$805 million) into building a plant in the Jingmen industrial park, and will have an annual capacity of 1.6 billion m^{2} of separator film.

On August 4, 2021, Eve Energy announced that it was building two additional assembly lines in the Jingmen facility, totaling 30 GWh of annual capacity. One will produce 15 GWh of LFP batteries for use in household and logistic vehicle applications, and the other will produce 15 GWh of NMC batteries for passenger vehicle traction batteries.

In November 2021, Eve Energy unveiled a new phased expansion plan for its Jingmen facilities that replaces the one announced in June. The expansion project will take CN¥ 21.91 billion (US$3.45 billion) of investment, with total facility investment rising to CN¥ 30.5 billion (US$4.8 billion). Expansion plans rose to a total of 124.11 GWh of annual capacity that is either planned or under construction, in addition to the 28.5 GWh operational at the time.

In February 2023, Eve Energy announced that it would invest another CN¥ 10.8 billion (US$1.6 billion) into the Jingmen facility to raise its annual capacity by 60 GWh. It produces batteries for both power supply and energy storage applications, and had an annual capacity of 72.5 GWh at the time, which rose to a total of 152.61 GWh once the expansion projects announced since June 2021 finished by Q2 2023.

=== Chengdu, Sichuan ===
In October 2021, Eve Energy announced plans for a new lithium-ion battery research and development center and manufacturing plant located in Chengdu, Sichuan. The manufacturing plant and research institute will be built in two phases, with the first phase projected to have an annual capacity of 20 GWh and the second phase an additional 30 GWh. The total investment will be CN¥ 20 billion, and will occupy a 1000 mu (66.7 ha) parcel of land.

=== Huizhou, Guangdong ===
On February 19, 2021, Eve Energy announced that it will invest CN¥ 1 billion to build a battery plant producing prismatic format LFP cells, and CN¥ 2.6 billion to build a hybrid vehicle battery management systems, all located in Huizhou, Guangdong.

Less than a month later on March 11, Eve Energy announced that it will invest an additional CN¥ 3.9 billion (US$600 million) to expand the battery plant portion of the project, which will finish in 18 months. with the land area nearly doubling to 11.7 hectares.

On January 29, 2022, Eve Energy signed an agreement with the Huizhou city government as part of its initiative to invest CN¥ 100 billion into the new energy battery industry complex in the city. Eve Energy committed a minimum of CN¥ 2 billion (US$315 million) of investment into research and development into the city. This includes building research and development centers for batteries and their materials, and increasing the number of senior personnel including PhD holders. Additionally, Eve Energy will introduce upstream battery materials suppliers and their projects into the area as part of the initiative. Eve Energy projects that it will have an economic impact of CN¥ 100 billion in the Huizhou area by 2025.

=== Qujing, Yunnan ===
In June 2022, initial plans for a new facility in Qujing, Yunnan were revealed, with an investment of CN¥ 3 billion and 10 GWh of annual capacity for the production of cylindrical-format LFP battery cells.

On January 18, 2023, due to high demand from the new energy vehicle industry, it was announced that investment was raised to CN¥ 5.5 billion (US$815 million) and annual capacity raised to 23 GWh; construction is expected to take 18 months and will commence immediately after approval is completed.

=== Kulim District, Malaysia ===
In October 2022, Eve Energy's Malaysian subsidiary announced that plans to invest up to US$422 million into a new battery factory in Malaysia to be completed within three years. In July 2024 Eve Energy announced that it will invest CN¥ 3.3 billion (US$454 million) to build a new factory in Malaysia. It will be located in the Kulim District in the state of Kedah, and is expected to be finished by 2027 after breaking ground in August 2023. It will produce 21700 cylindrical-format NMC battery cells for use in power tools, two-wheeled vehicles, and cleaning devices. The factory will occupy a 26.9 hectare parcel of land.

On February 17, 2025, Eve Energy announced that the facility had produced its first production battery cells the previous day. It is Eve Energy's first operational plant outside of China, and is their 53rd battery plant globally. It has the capacity to produce 680 million battery cells annually.

=== Debrecen, Hungary ===
In October 2023, Eve Energy announced that it will invest 400 billion Ft (US$1.4 billion) into a new battery factory in Hungary to supply BMW's Neue Klasse next-generation vehicles. It is expected to be operational by 2026 with an annual output of 28 GWh and will be located in Debrecen. The batteries will be 46 mm (1.8 in) diameter cylindrical NMC cells packaged in a 'cell-to-pack' arrangement, with the packs running at 800 V and capable of up to 350 kW charging speeds.

=== Other locations ===
- Jingzhou, Hubei
- Qidong, Jiangsu
- Shenyang, Liaoning
- Jianyang, Sichuan

== Partnerships ==
=== SK Innovation ===
On September 26, 2019, Eve Energy announced that it will invest US$525 million to form a 50:50 joint venture with SK Innovation. The joint venture will produce pouch format cells intended for automotive applications, with an annual capacity of 20-25GWh.

In December 2020, SK Innovation took on all of Eve Energy subsidiary Eve United Energy's loans in exchange for a 49 percent stake in the unit, a CN¥ 2 billion (US$310 million) move.

=== Amplify Cell Technologies ===
On September 6, 2023, Eve Energy announced that it would establish an American joint venture to serve the North American electric commercial vehicle market. In June 2024 Amplify Cell Technologies (ACT), a joint venture between Eve Energy (10% equity), Accelera, Daimler Trucks & Buses, and Paccar (30% equity each), broke ground on a new battery manufacturing facility located in Marshall County, Mississippi, USA. It will produce square LFP batteries intended for use in North American commercial vehicles produced by the joint venture partners, with an annual production capacity of 21 GWh and production expected to begin in 2026. ACT will use licenses and pay royalties as needed from Eve Power to manufacture and use its products and technologies.

=== Daimler ===
In August 2018, Eve Energy won a contract to provide Daimler with automotive traction batteries over the following ten years.

=== Powin ===
In 2021 Powin, a battery energy storage system manufacturer based in Oregon, USA, signed a two-year agreement with Eve Energy for the supply of LFP batteries for use in up to 500 MWh of products.

On June 15, 2023, Powin made a multi-year agreement for the supply of 10 GWh of LFP battery cells with Eve Energy, for use in New South Wales' Waratah battery storage system project.

On June 19, 2024, Powin signed a multi-year agreement for the supply of 15 GWh of 280 Ah and 306 Ah LFP battery cells with Eve Energy.

=== ABB ===
On September 11, 2024 ABB signed an MoU with Eve Energy to assist in the creation of lithium battery factories.

=== American Battery Solutions ===
On June 16, 2023, the energy storage system maker American Battery Solutions signed a purchase agreement for 13.4GWh of prismatic LFP battery cells.

=== Energy Absolute ===
On July 28, 2023, Eve Energy signed a memorandum of understanding with Thai renewable energy company Energy Absolute to form joint venture to build a battery manufacturing plant with an annual capacity of at least 6 GWh. Eve Energy will hold 51 percent of the joint venture and Energy Absolute will hold 49 percent, but profits will be split equally.

=== Hunan Zhongke Electric ===
In October 2021, Eve Energy announced that it will form a joint venture with Hunan Zhongke Electric to build a plant supplying battery cathode materials. CN¥ 2.5 billion (US$391 million) will be invested into the plant, which will be built in two phases, and will have an annual capacity of 100 kilotons of cathode materials when fully completed. The first phase will be capable of roughly half capacity, and will be ready for operation within 18 months of the announcement.

=== Aksa Power Generation ===
In January 2024, Eve Energy signed a non-binding agreement with Aksa Power Generation to form a joint venture. The joint venture will manufacture and sell battery modules and energy storage units, along with constructing energy storage system projects as a contractor locally in Turkey.

=== Greenfuel Energy Solutions ===
In February 2024 Greenfuel Energy Solutions, an Indian manufacturer of energy storage systems, announced a partnership with Eve Energy.
