= Volkswagen Lavida =

Compact sedan manufactured by Volkswagen

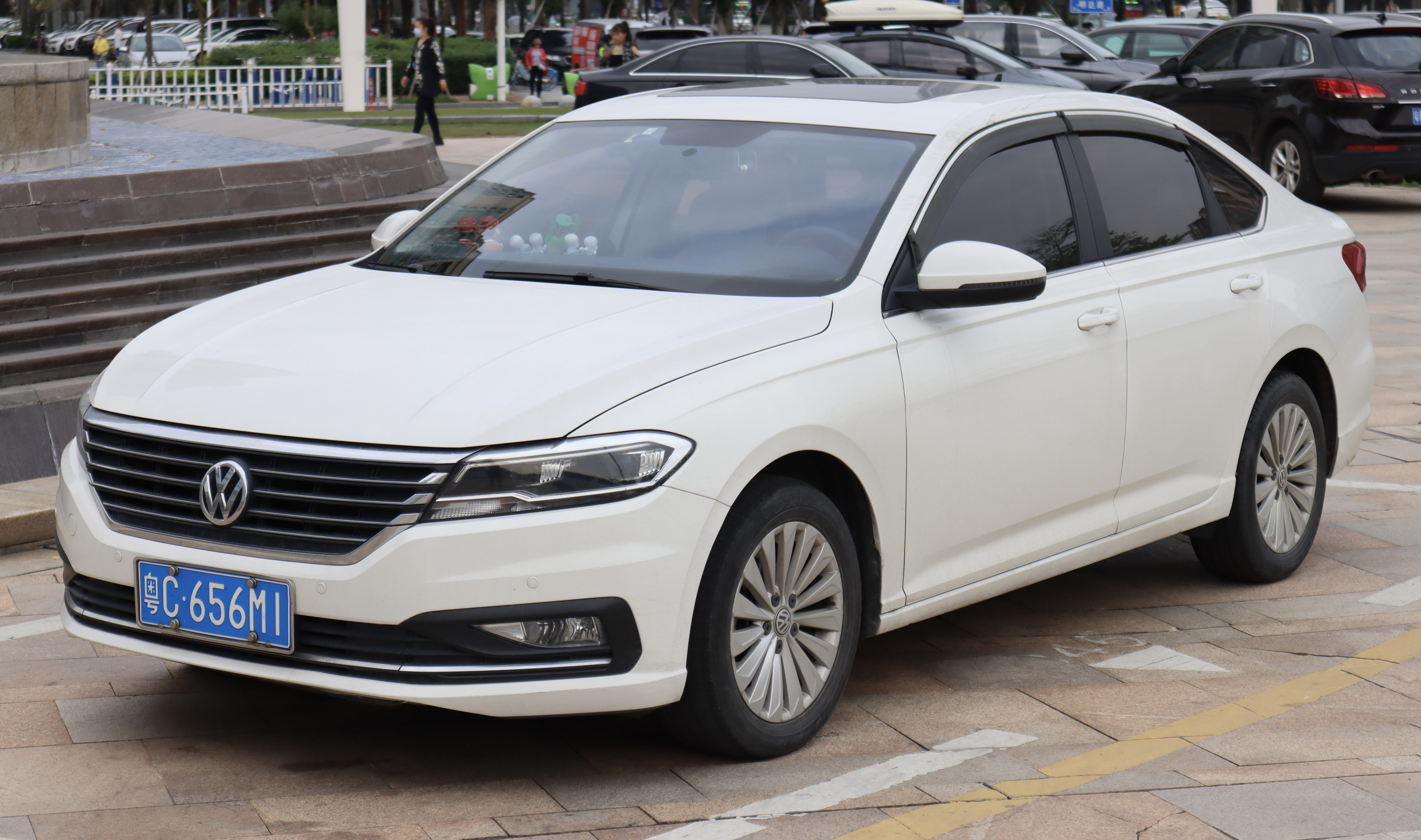

Overview
- Manufacturer: Volkswagen
- Production: 2008–present

Body and chassis
- Class: Small family car/compact car (C)
- Layout: Front-engine, front-wheel-drive

The Volkswagen Lavida (Chinese: 大众朗逸; pinyin: Dàzhòng Lǎngyì) is a compact car produced by the German automobile manufacturer Volkswagen. Originally launched at Auto China 2008 in Beijing, the Lavida is considered the first mass-produced Volkswagen small family car to be mainly designed by its Chinese partner. In 2010, the car was the number one seller in China, with 251,615 vehicles delivered.

== First generation (Typ 18; 2008) ==
First generation
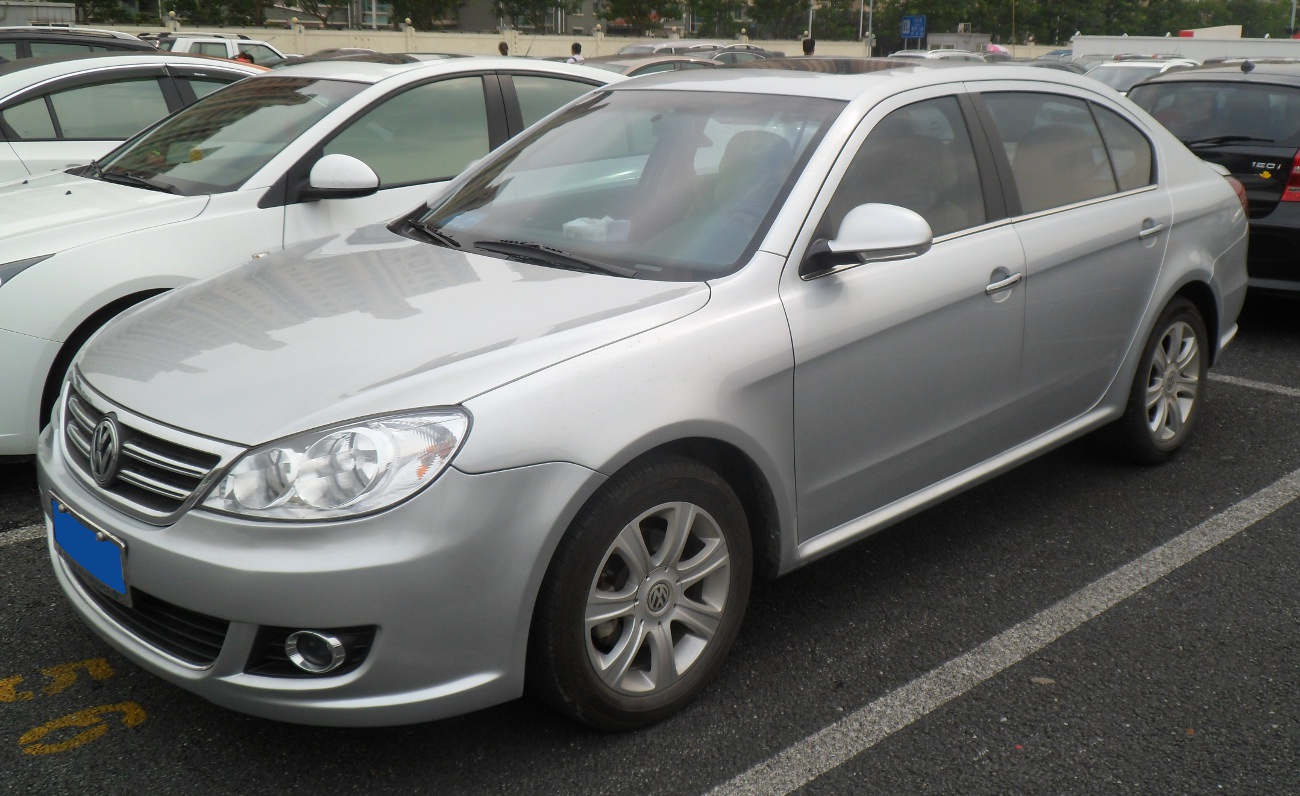

Overview
- Also called: Volkswagen Lavida Classic (2012–2018)
- Production: 2008–2012
- Assembly: China: Anting, Shanghai (SAIC-VW)

Body and chassis
- Body style: 4-door sedan
- Platform: Volkswagen Group A4 (PQ34) platform
- Related: VW Golf Mk4; VW Jetta/Bora Mk4; VW New Beetle; Audi A3 Mk1; Audi TT Mk1; SEAT León Mk1; SEAT Toledo Mk2; Škoda Octavia Mk1

Powertrain
- Engine: Petrol: 1.4 L TSI 131 PS (96 kW; 129 hp) I4; 1.6 L EA113，EA111 105 PS (77 kW; 104 hp) I4; 2.0 L EA113 120 PS (88 kW; 120 hp) I4
- Transmission: 5-speed manual 6-speed Tiptronic; 7-speed DSG

Dimensions
- Wheelbase: 2,610 mm (102.8 in)
- Length: 4,605 mm (181.3 in)
- Width: 1,743 mm (68.6 in)
- Height: 1,465 mm (57.7 in)

The first generation Lavida is based on the Volkswagen Group PQ34 platform (PQ34L) and competes with a similar Chinese Volkswagen model produced by FAW-Volkswagen which is the Bora.

At launch, it was equipped with two engine options, which were a 1.6-litre or 2.0-litre. The Lavida 1.4 TSI Sport was added to the range at Auto Shanghai 2009, which uses the same engine as the Sagitar TSI and equipped with either a 5-speed manual transmission or a 7-speed DSG transmission.

Up until the replacement in April 2012, the Lavida sold more than 700,000 units. In July 2015, Volkswagen launched a 'New Lavida' with a redesigned exterior, but resembling a notchback, compared to the first generation Lavida resembling a fastback.

=== Engines ===
The Lavida has three engine options: the 1.4-litre turbo, 1.6-litre and 2.0-litre petrol engine. The 1.6-litre engine also powers the Polo Mk4 sedan, while the 2.0-litre engine powers the Volkswagen Passat. The 1.4 TSI engine is shared with the Sagitar, Magotan, Golf Mk6 and Bora. The 2.0-litre engine was dropped in the facelift model of 2012. The 1.4-litre is able to accelerate from zero to 100 km/h (62 mph) in 9.6 seconds, and has a top speed of 190 km/h (118.1 mph). The 1.6L version has a top speed of 180 km/h (111.8 mph).

name	engine type	displacement	max. power	max. torque	transmission	model years
1.4TSI	I4 DOHC 16V turbo	1390 cc	131 PS (96 kW; 129 hp)	220 N⋅m (162 lb⋅ft)	5 speed manual/7 speed DSG	2010–2012
1.6	I4 DOHC 16V	1598 cc	105 PS (77 kW; 104 hp)	155 N⋅m (114 lb⋅ft)	5 speed manual/6 speed tiptronic	2008–2012
2.0	I4 SOHC 8V	1984 cc	120 PS (88 kW; 120 hp)	172 N⋅m (127 lb⋅ft)	5 speed manual/6 speed tiptronic	2008–2012

=== E-Lavida ===
In 2010, Shanghai Volkswagen unveiled an E-Lavida concept car at Auto China 2010, though no details of production have been forthcoming.

=== Gallery ===
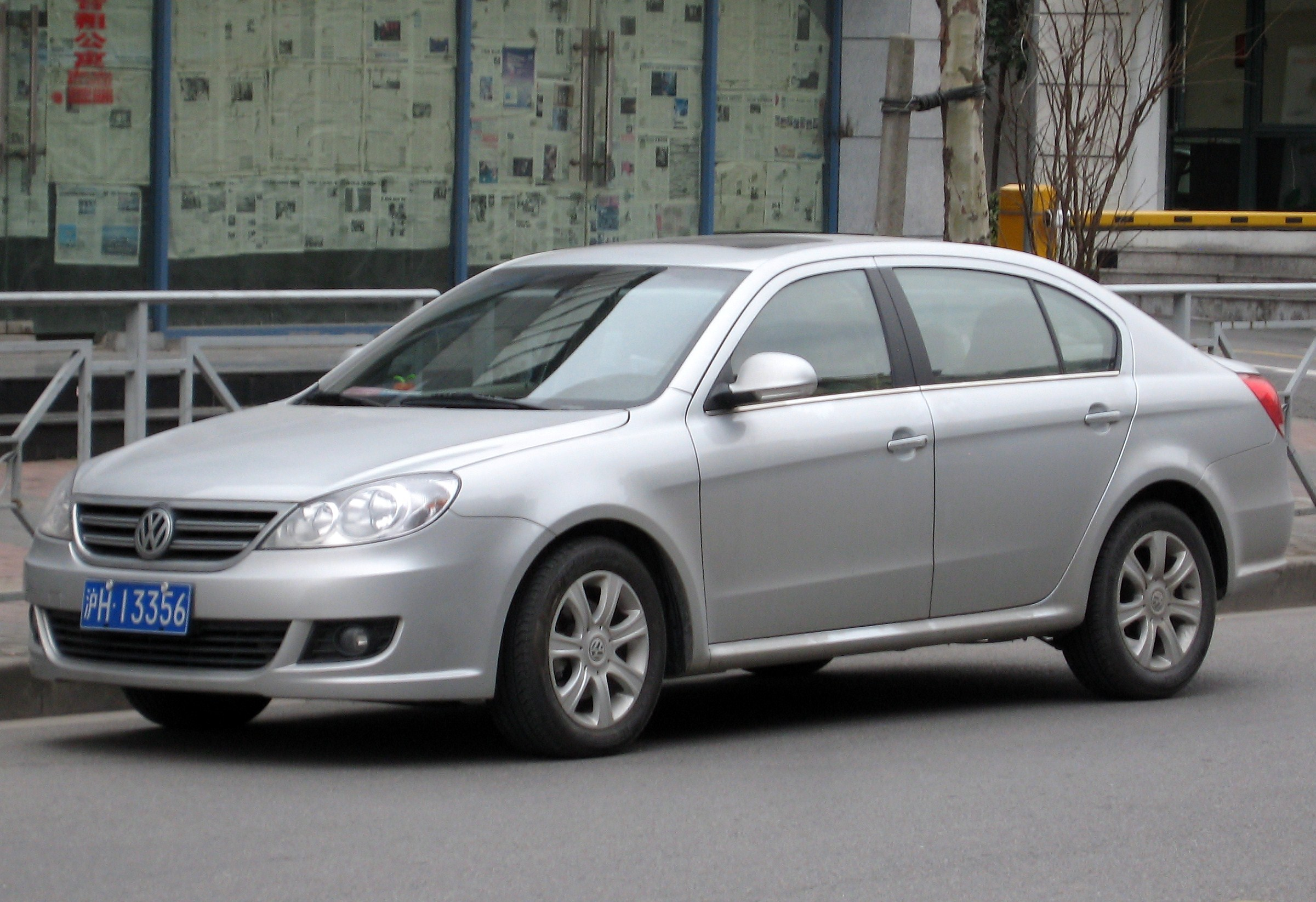
2009 Volkswagen Lavida (China)

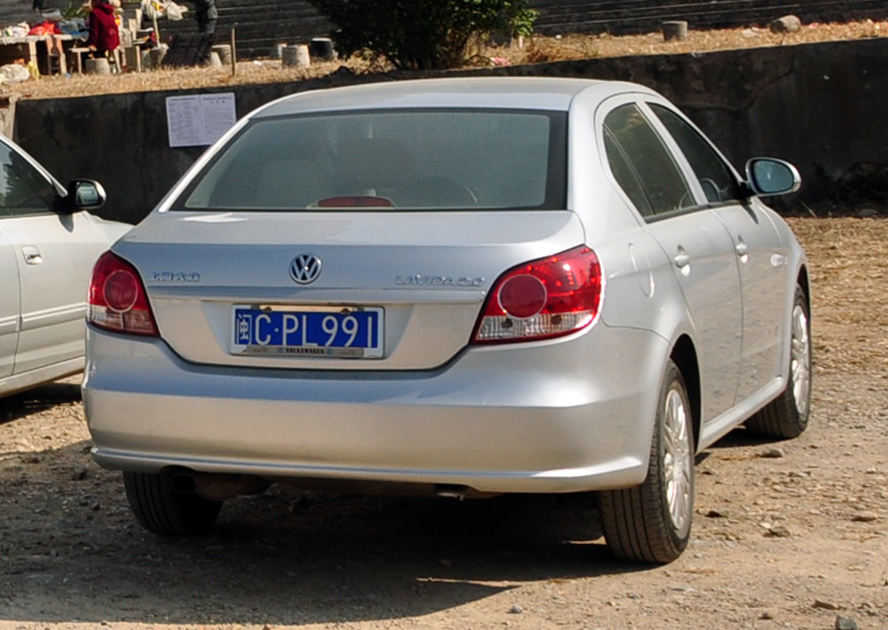
2009 Volkswagen Lavida (rear) (China)

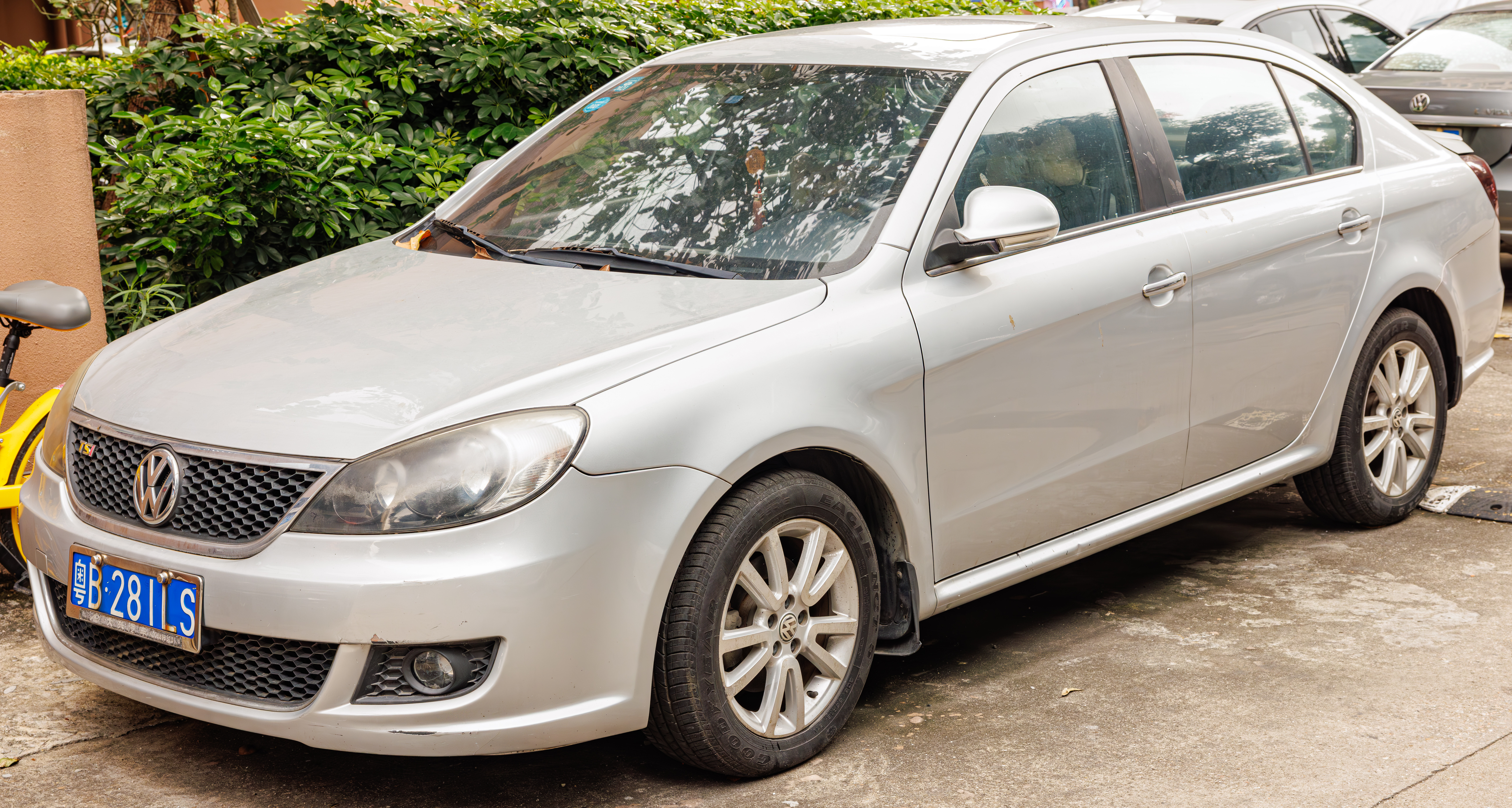
2010 Volkswagen Lavida TSI Sport (China)

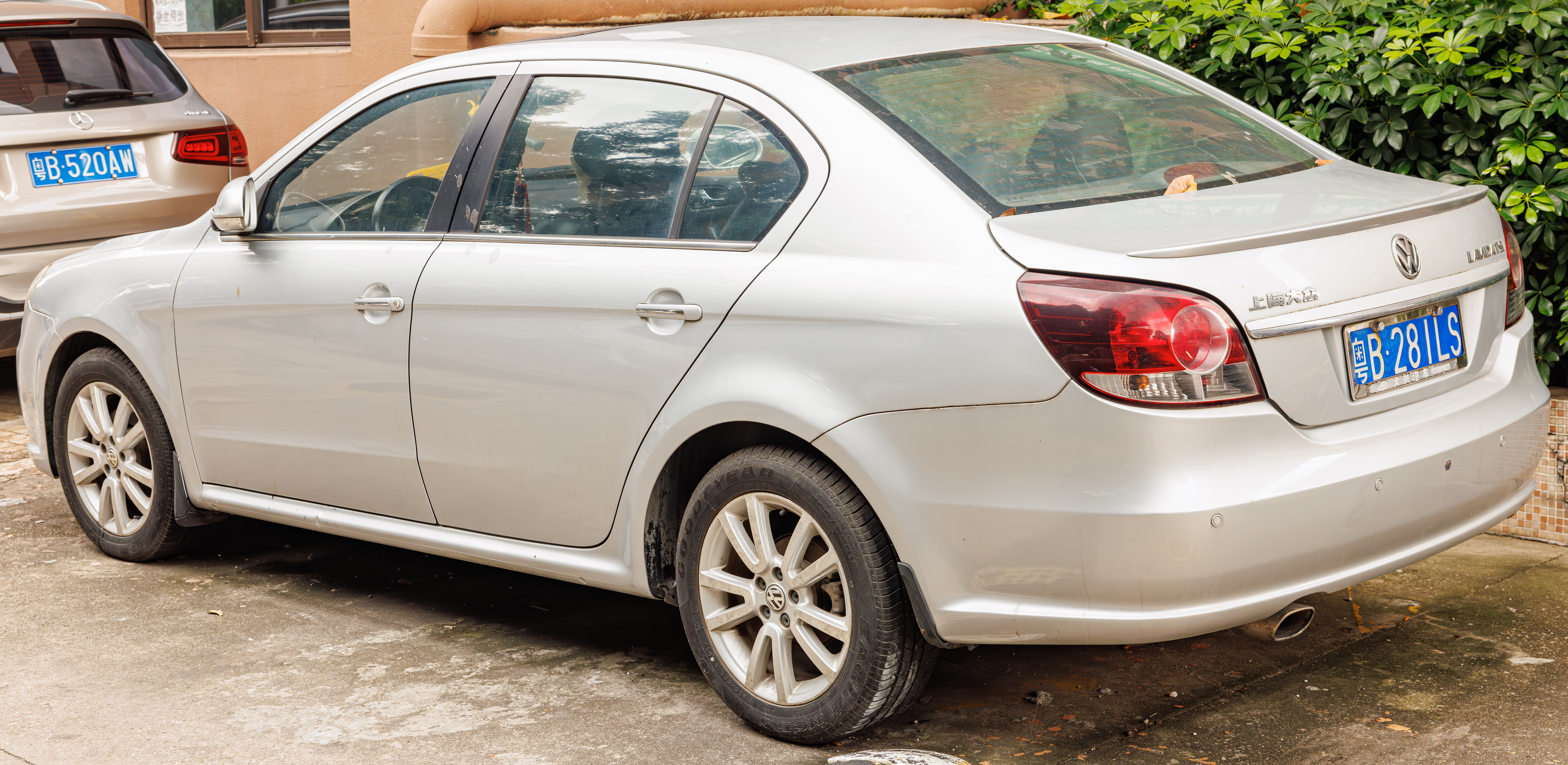
2010 Volkswagen Lavida TSI Sport (rear) (China)

== Second generation (Typ 18; 2012) ==
Second generation
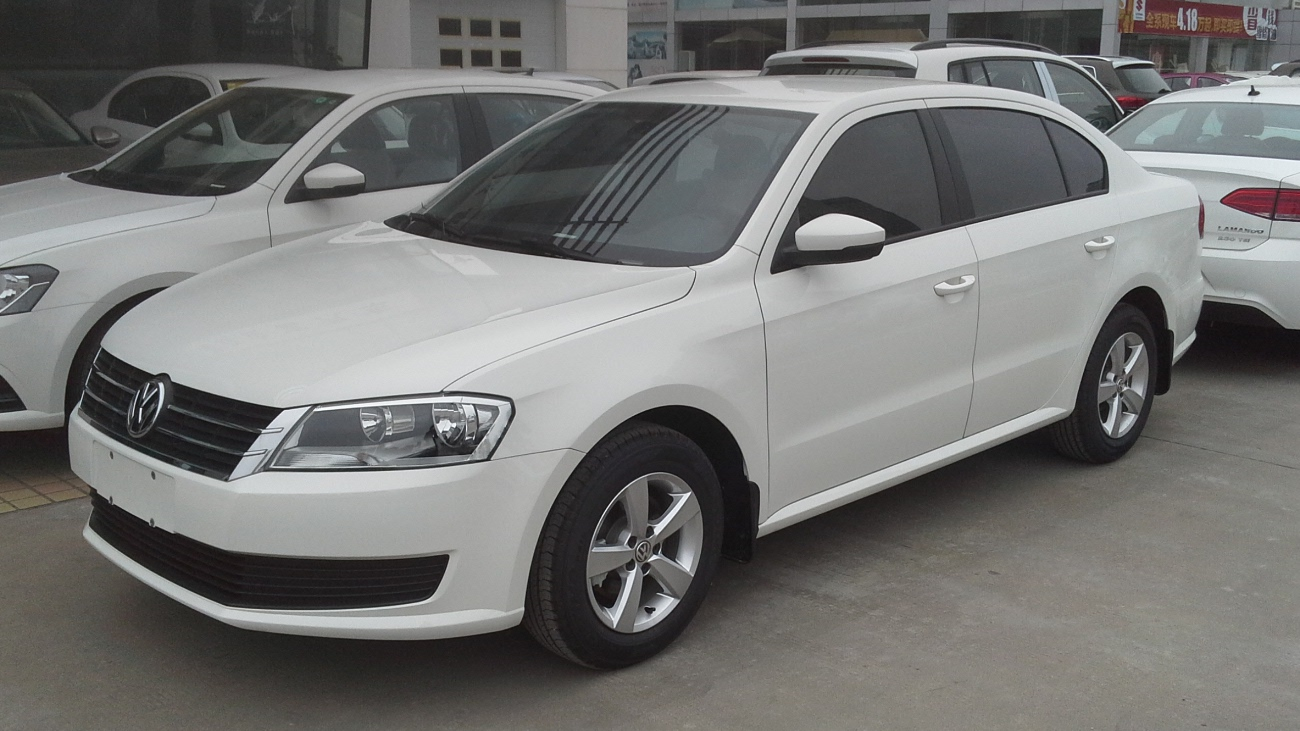

Overview
- Also called: Volkswagen Lavida Qihang (2019–2023)
- Production: 2012–2023
- Assembly: China: Anting, Shanghai (SAIC-VW)

Body and chassis
- Body style: 4-door sedan 5-door station wagon
- Platform: Volkswagen Group A4 (PQ34) platform
- Related: VW Golf Mk4; VW Jetta/Bora Mk4; VW New Beetle; Audi A3 Mk1; Audi TT Mk1; SEAT León Mk1; SEAT Toledo Mk2; Škoda Octavia Mk1

Powertrain
- Engine: Petrol: 1.2 L EA211 TSI I4; 1.4 L EA211 TSI I4; 1.6 L EA211 I4
- Transmission: 5-speed manual 6-speed Tiptronic; 7-speed DSG

Dimensions
- Wheelbase: 2,610 mm (102.8 in)
- Length: 4,605 mm (181.3 in) (Lavida); 4,454 mm (175.4 in) (Gran Lavida); 4,467 mm (175.9 in) (Cross Lavida)
- Width: 1,765 mm (69.5 in)
- Height: 1,460 mm (57.5 in); 1,490 mm (58.7 in)
- Curb weight: 1,245–1,325 kg (2,744.8–2,921.1 lb)

Chronology
- Predecessor: Volkswagen Jetta Mk6 (Philippines)
- Successor: Volkswagen Lavida XR

The range was significantly updated in 2012, with the launch of the New Lavida at the Beijing Auto Show. The 1.4-litre and 1.6-litre engines were carried over, and the 2.0-litre engine option was axed. Power outputs are 96 kW (131 PS) for the 1.4 TSI and 77 kW (105 PS) for the 1.6. The new Lavida is more notchback-looking than the first generation.

The new Lavida retains the 2,610 mm wheelbase, but is slightly lower, shorter and wider. It is built on the platform of the first generation Škoda Octavia and has an extended wheelbase. A new model called the Lavida Lang Xing was introduced as the hatchback variant of the New Lavida.

In May 2018, the Lavida, along with the Tiguan, Santana, and Lamando, was launched in the Philippines as part of the new ASEAN-China Free Trade Agreement (ACFTA). It Was Discontinued in September 2025 following the Termination of Distributorship Agreement Between AC Industrials and Volkswagen Group.

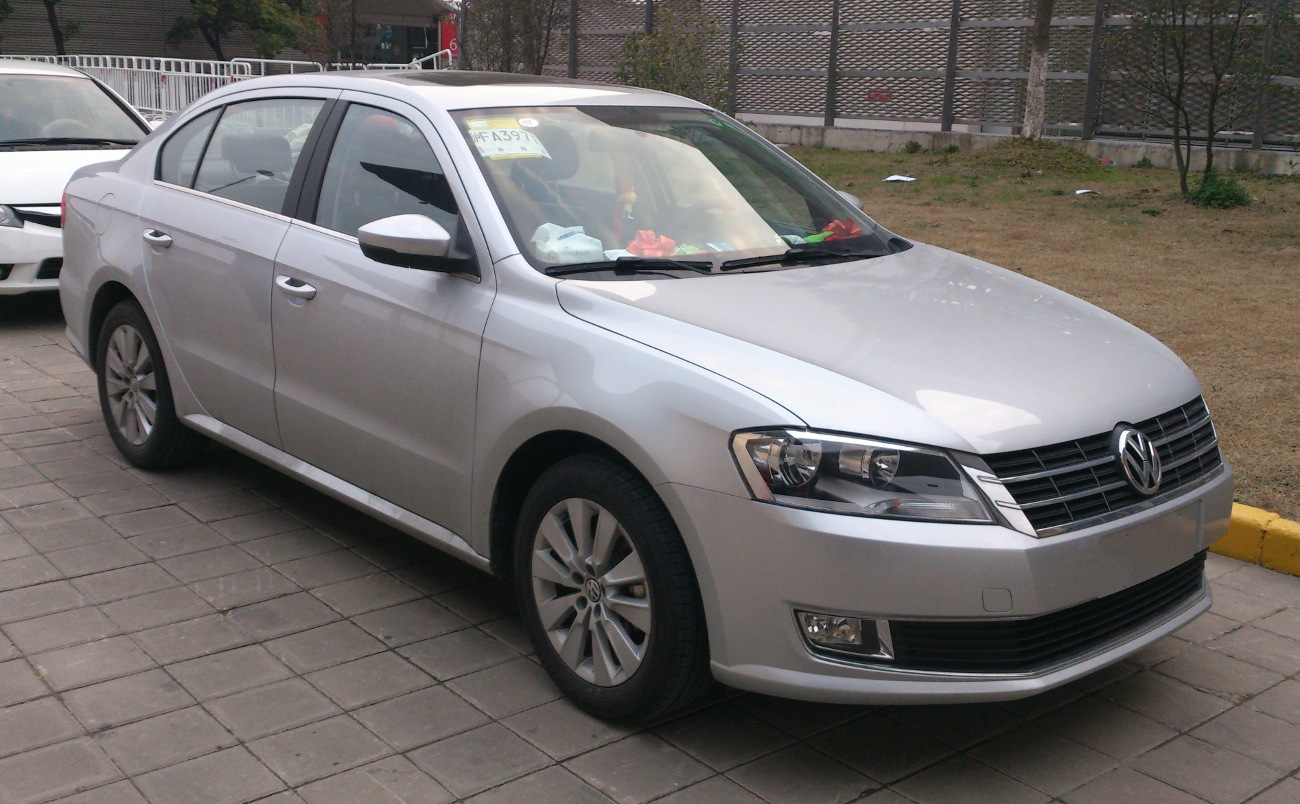
Volkswagen Lavida II sedan (front)

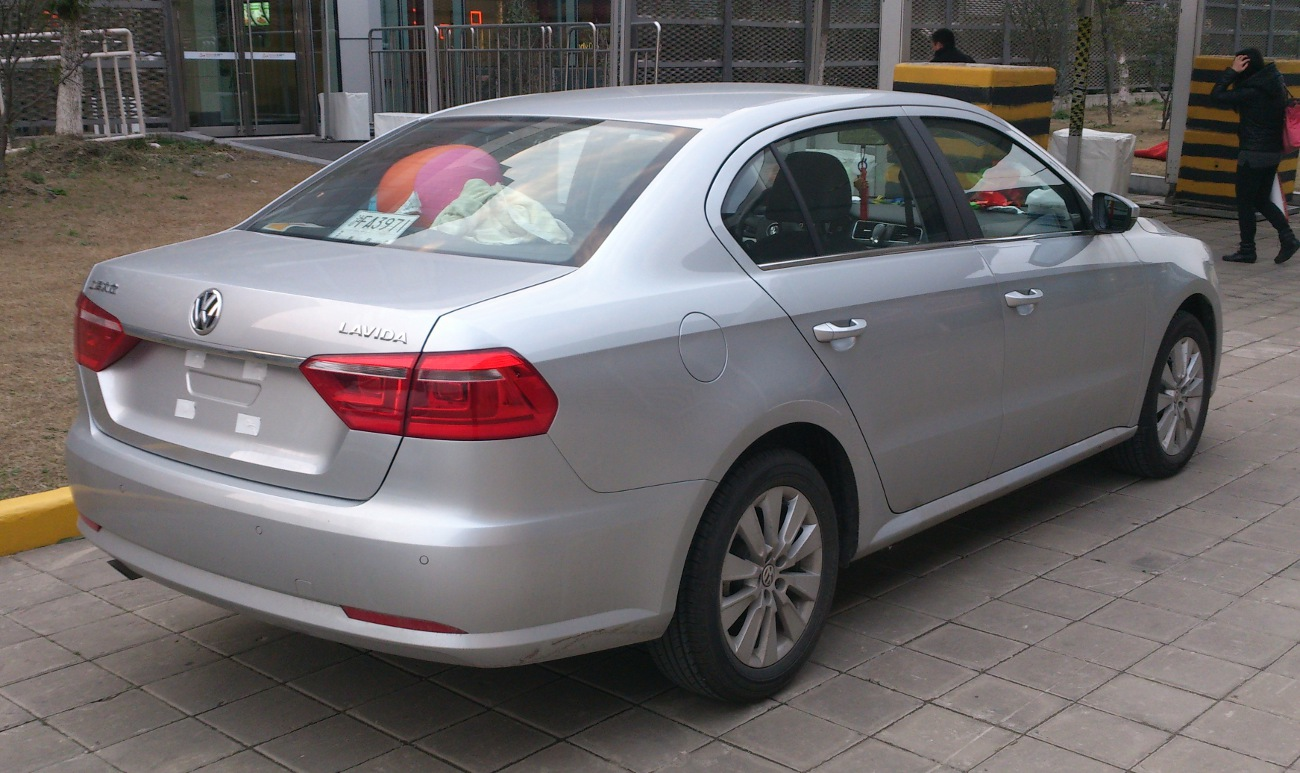
Volkswagen Lavida II sedan (rear)

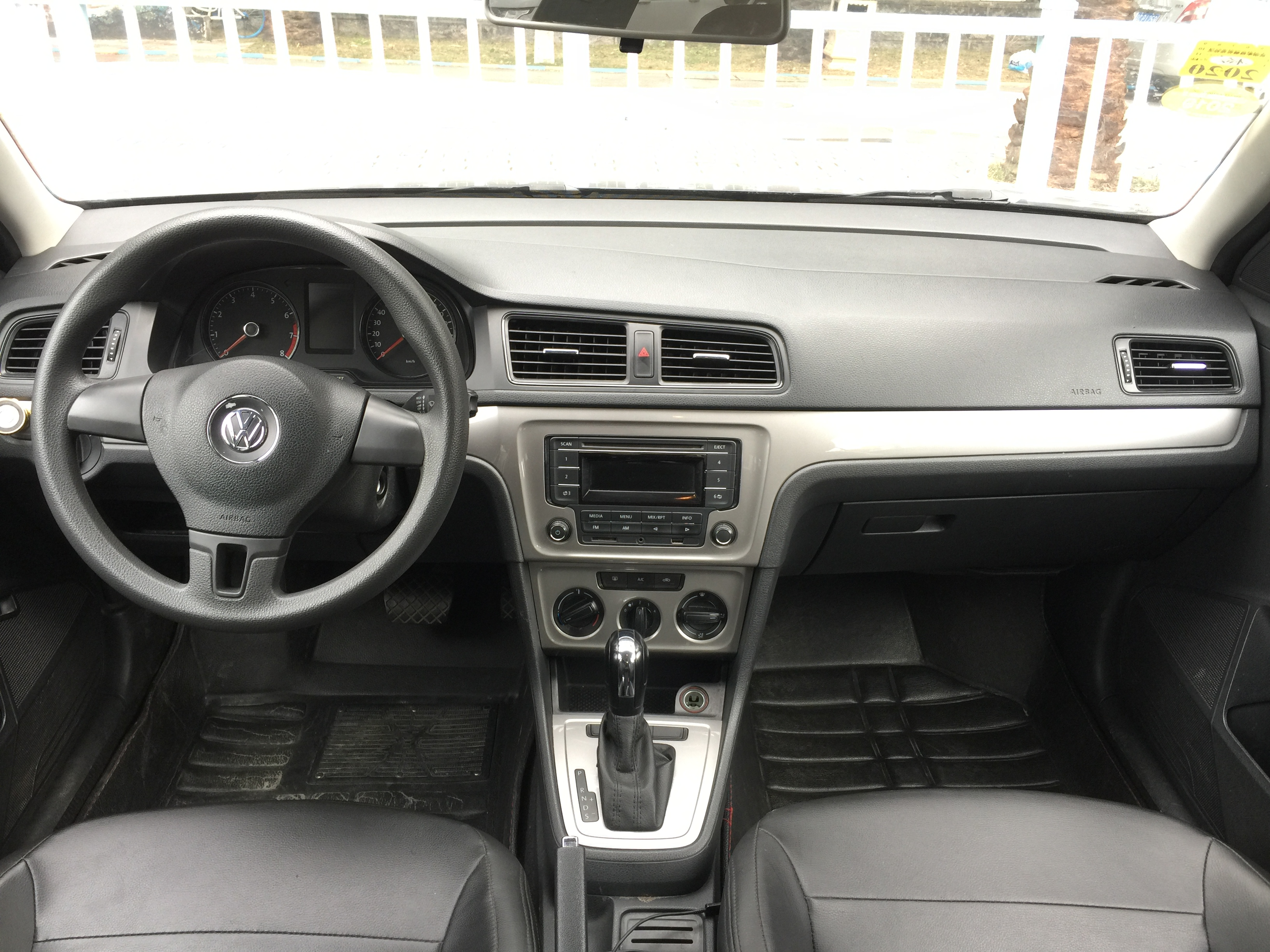
interior
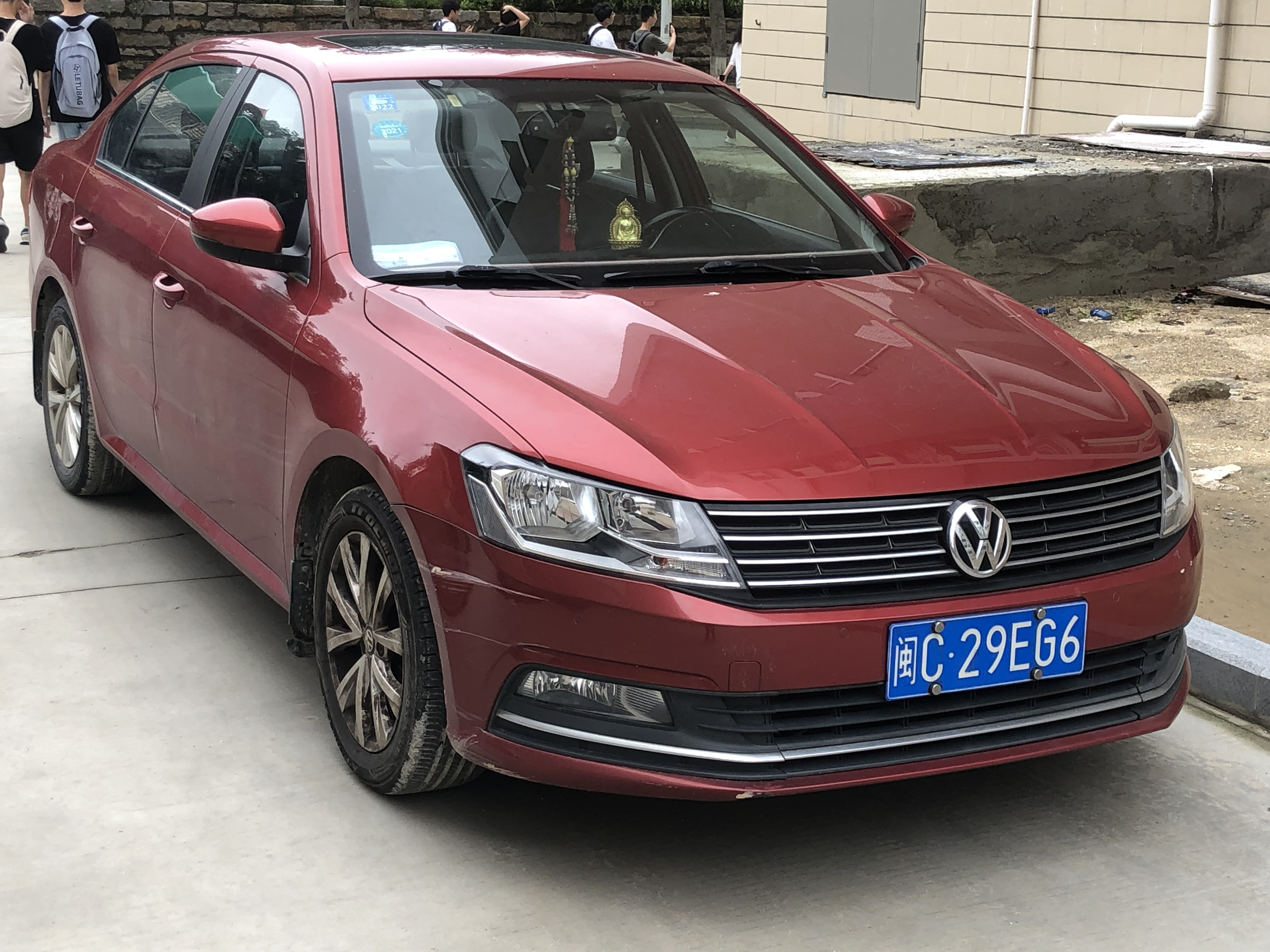
Volkswagen Lavida II sedan Facelift (front)

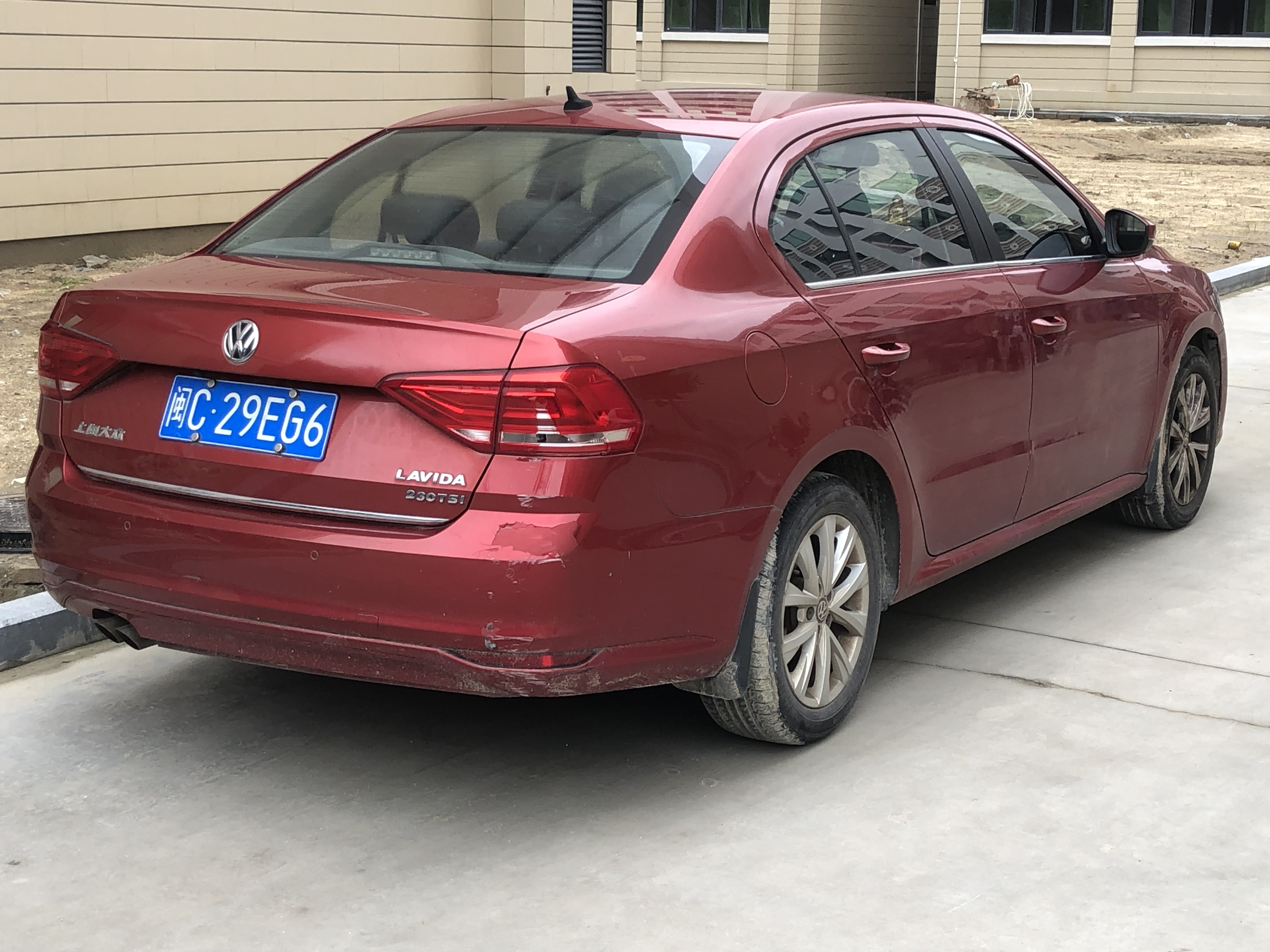
Volkswagen Lavida II sedan Facelift (rear)

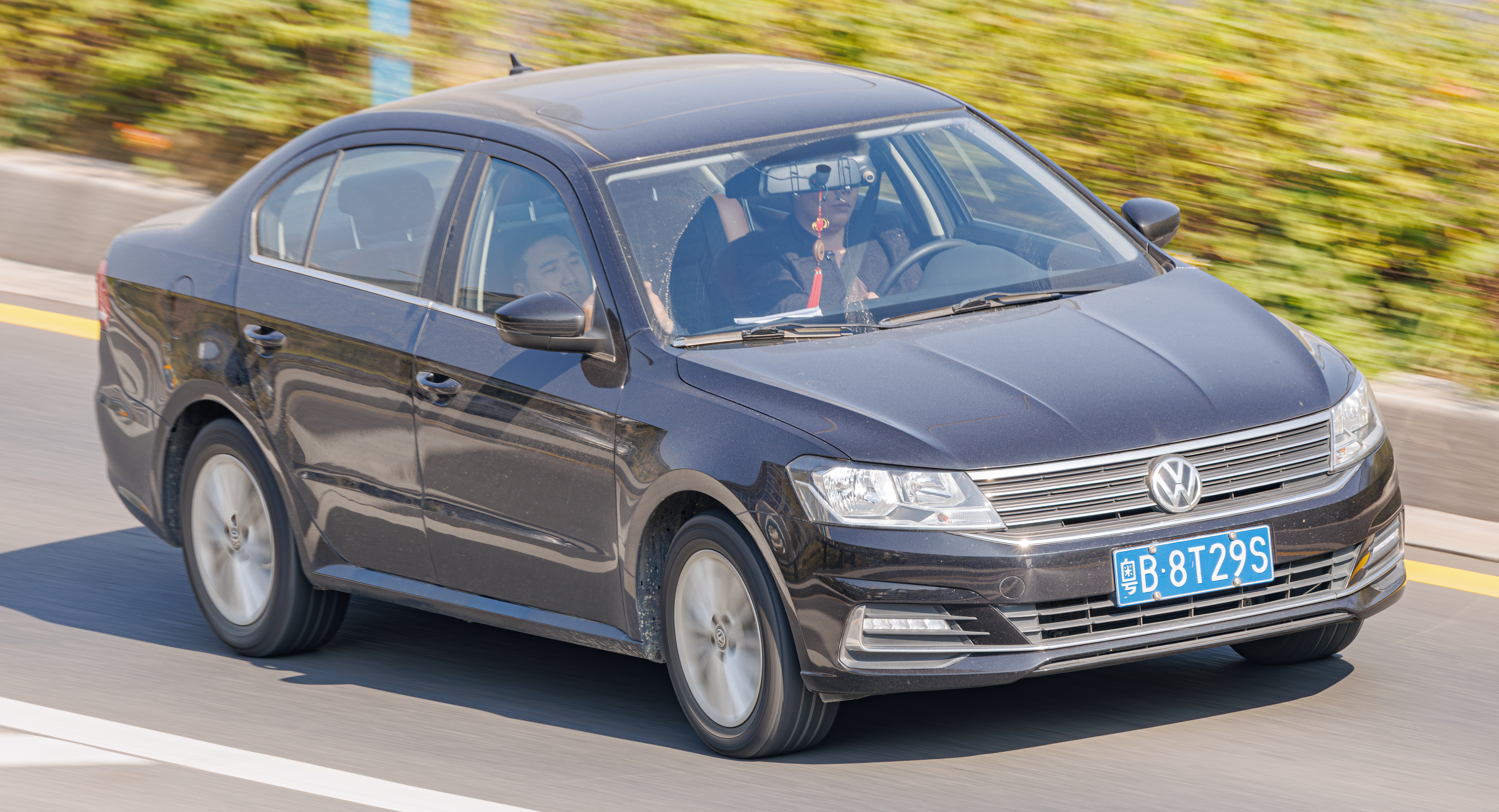
Volkswagen Lavida Qihang

=== Gran Lavida (2013–2017) ===
The Volkswagen Gran Lavida is a compact estate produced by Shanghai Volkswagen at its Anting plant. Marketed as a hatchback, it was launched in May 2013, replacing the Lavida Sport saloon.

In mid-2012, the Audi A3 Sportback 8P was used as base for the technical development of a new model. In November, the first test vehicles were seen on Chinese roads. The cars were named Škoda Sportback and had a typical Škoda grille and bumpers, using the typical Audi A3 like headlamps. The taillights resembled the Škoda Octavia II Combi.

The production version of the Gran Lavida was presented in April 2013 at the Shanghai Auto Show. The car adapted the sedan Lavida styling, apart from the B-pillar rearwards. According to initial information, the Gran Lavida was equipped 1.4-litre engine as standard, followed by a 1.8-litre engine and a 2.0-litre as the top engine. A crossover-themed variant of the Gran Lavida called the Cross Lavida commenced production in November 2013.

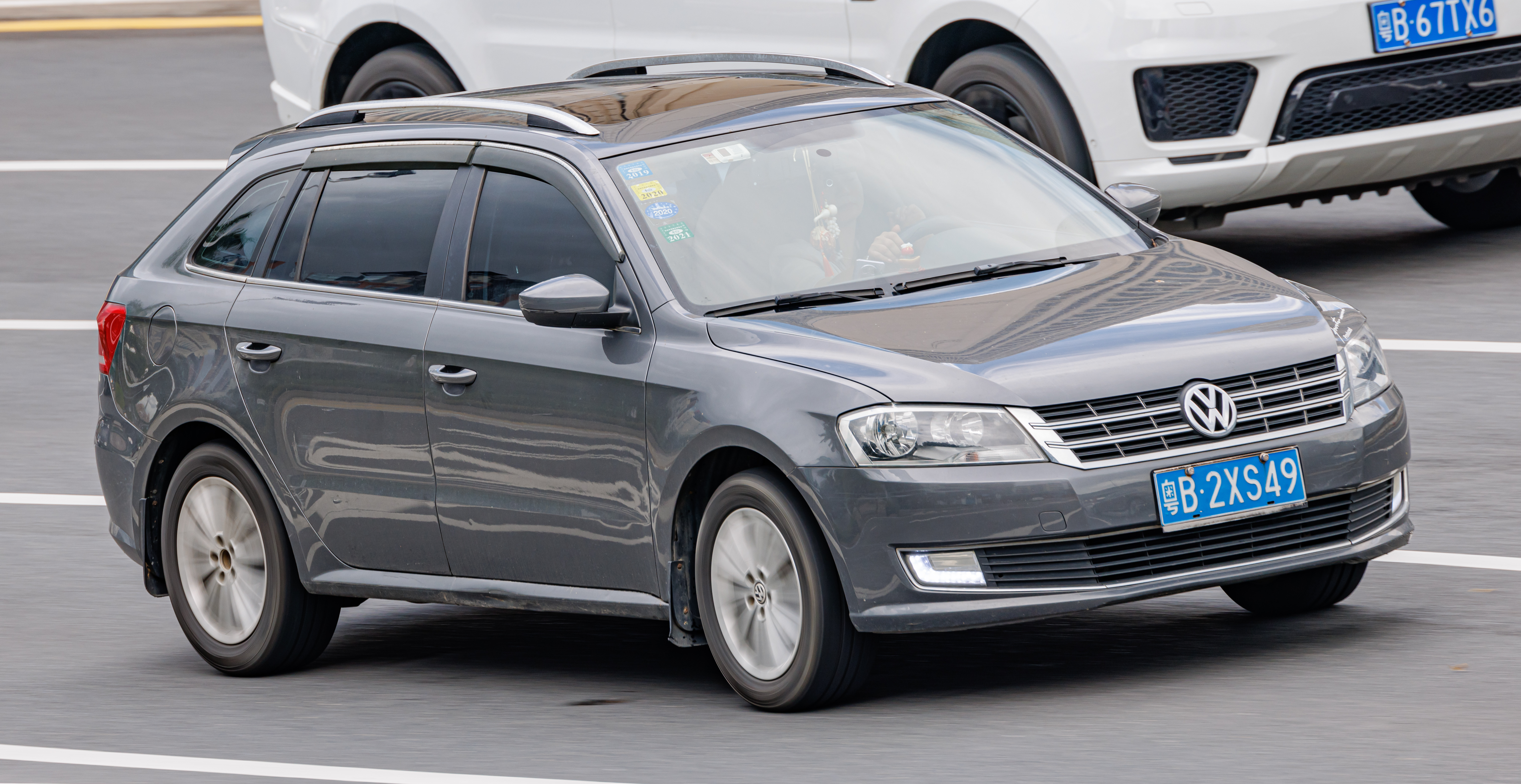
Volkswagen Gran Lavida (front, pre-facelift)

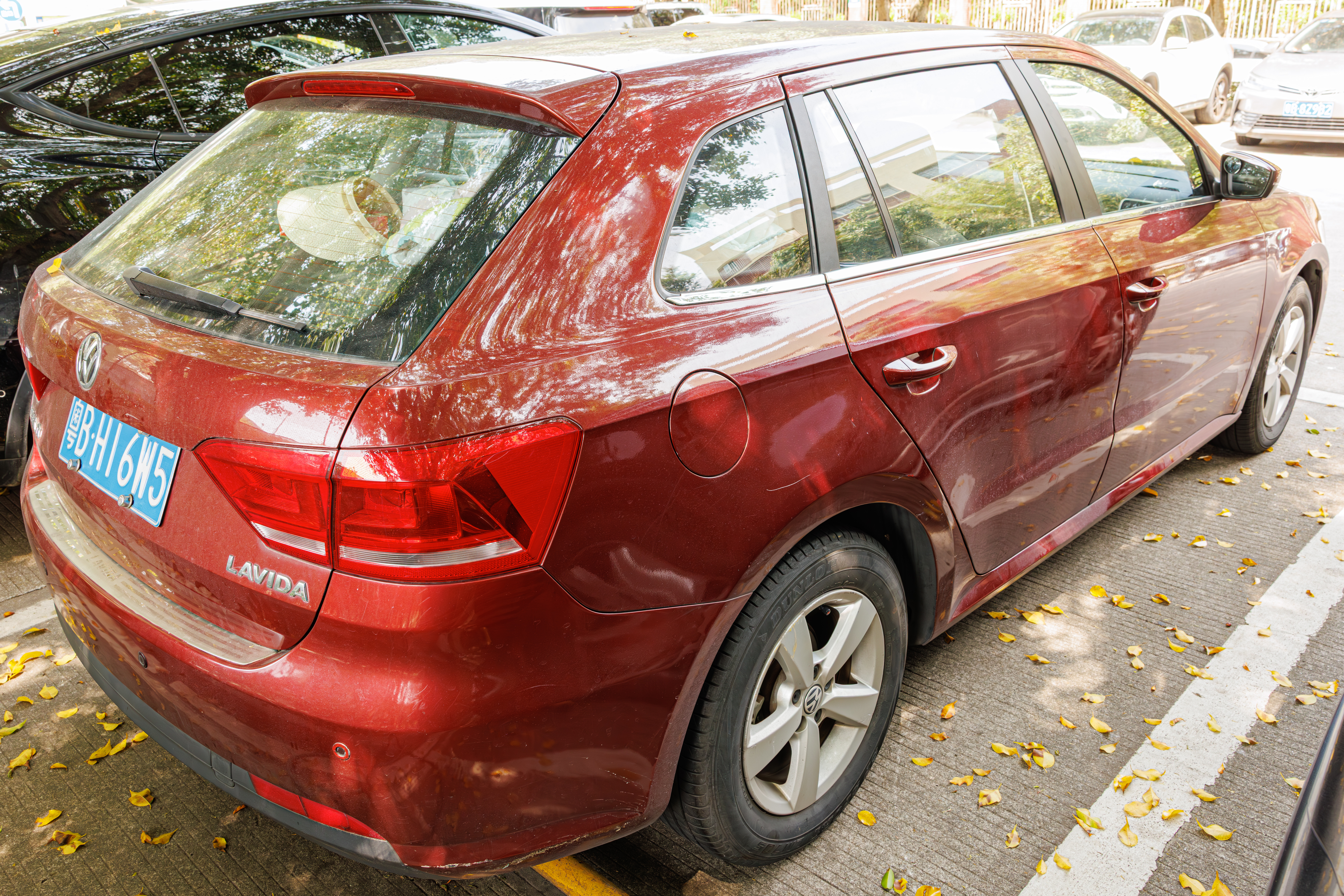
Volkswagen Gran Lavida (rear, pre-facelift)

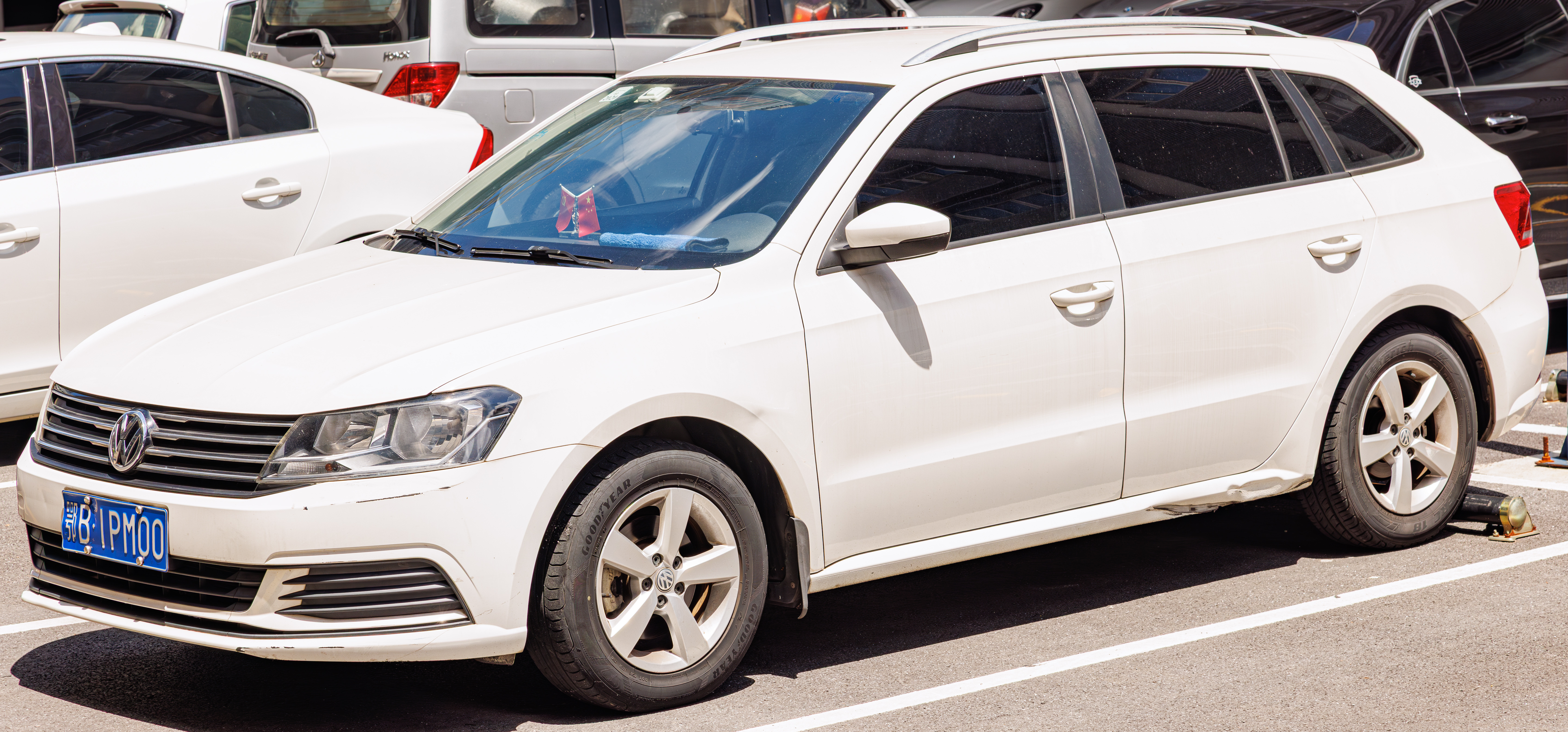
Volkswagen Gran Lavida (front, facelift)

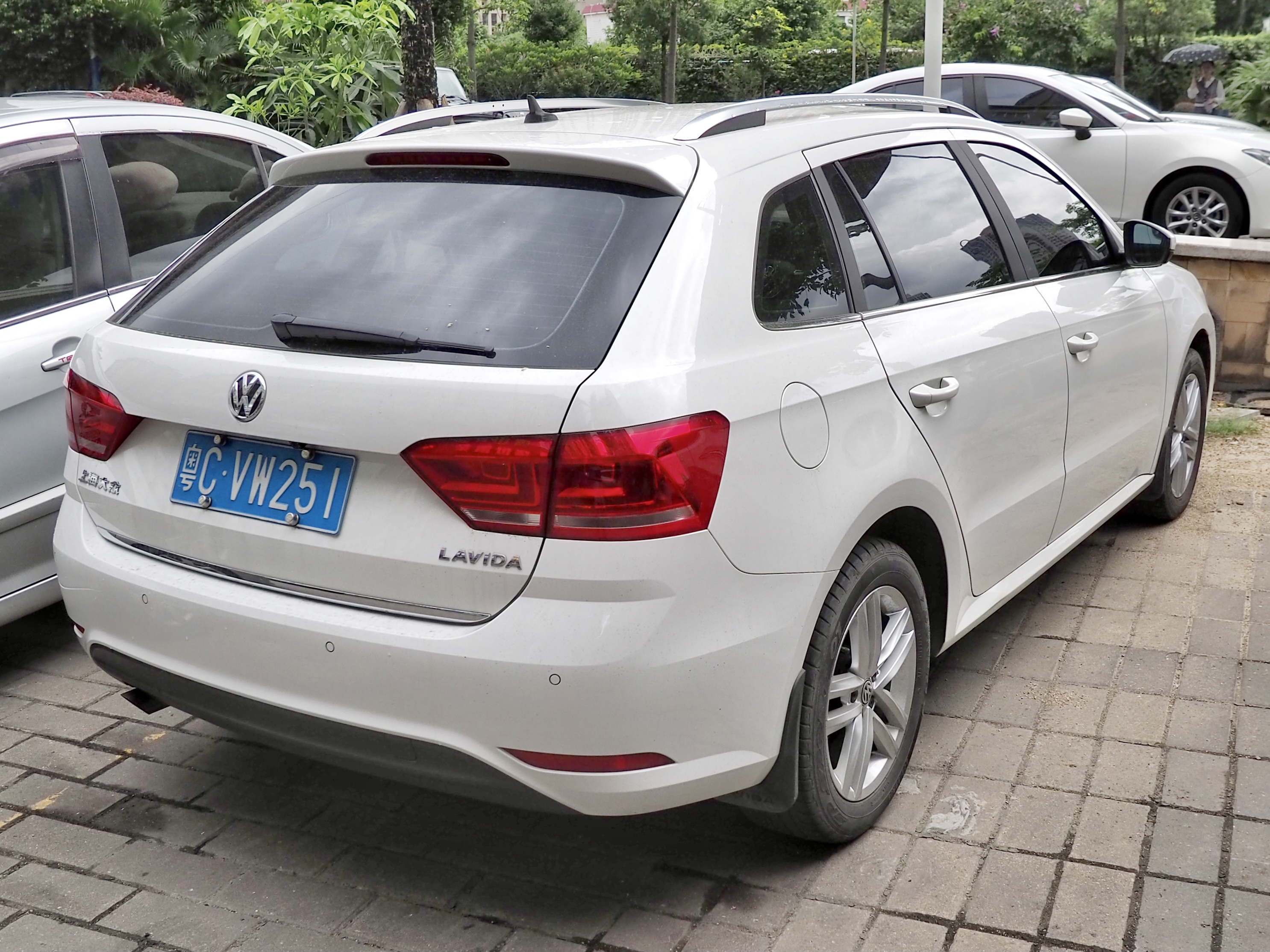
Volkswagen Gran Lavida (rear, facelift)
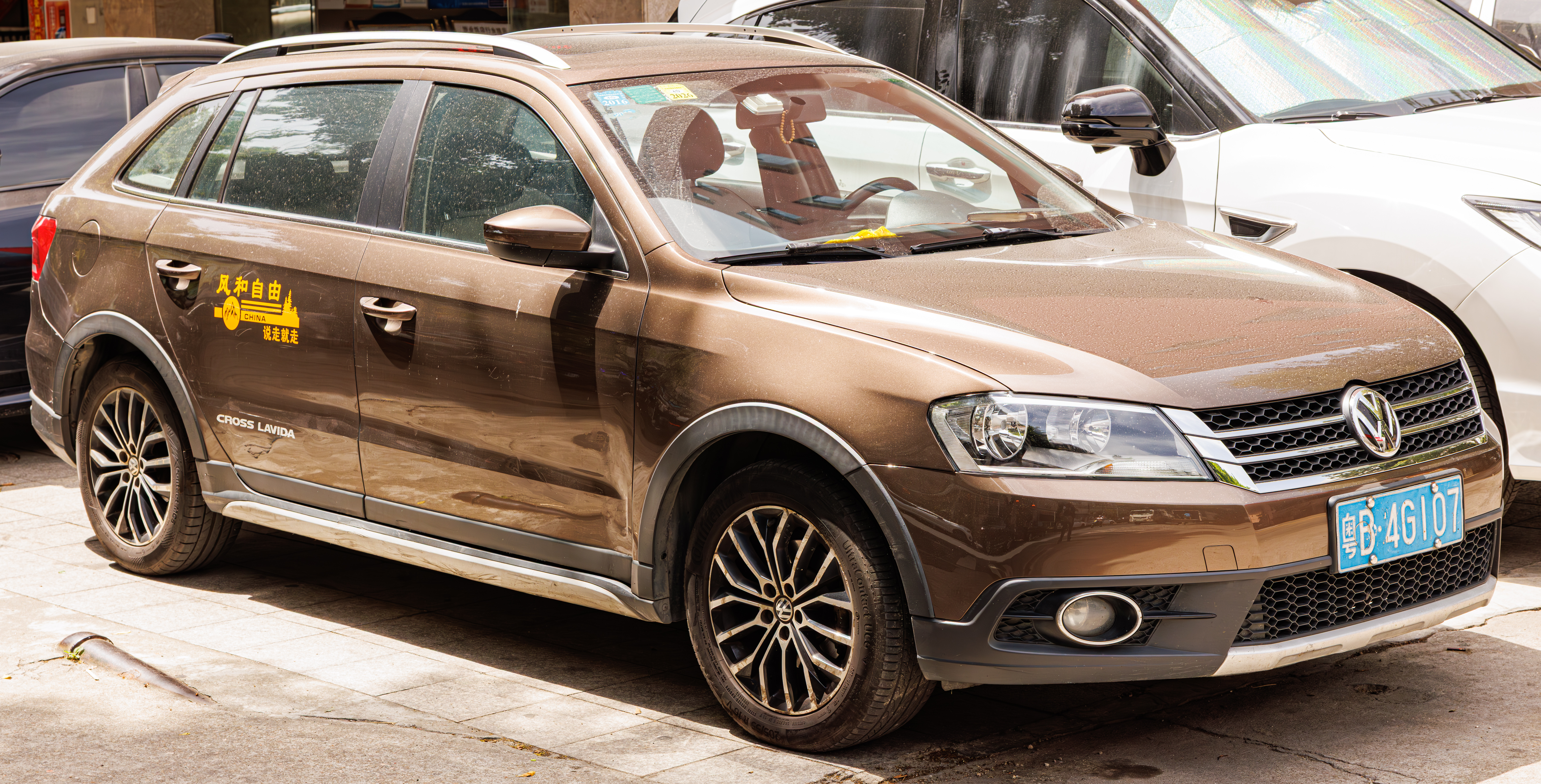
Volkswagen Cross Lavida (front, pre-facelift)

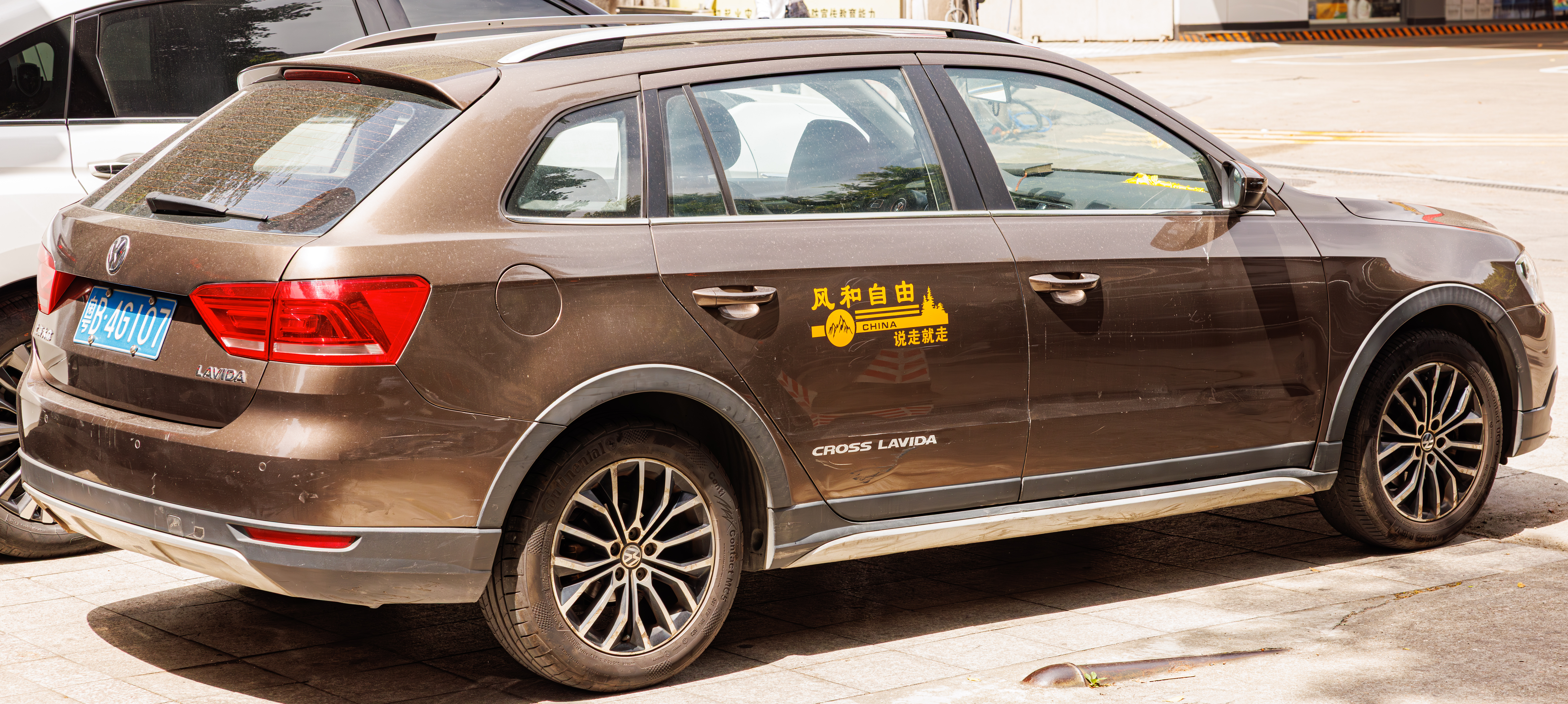
Volkswagen Cross Lavida (rear, pre-facelift)

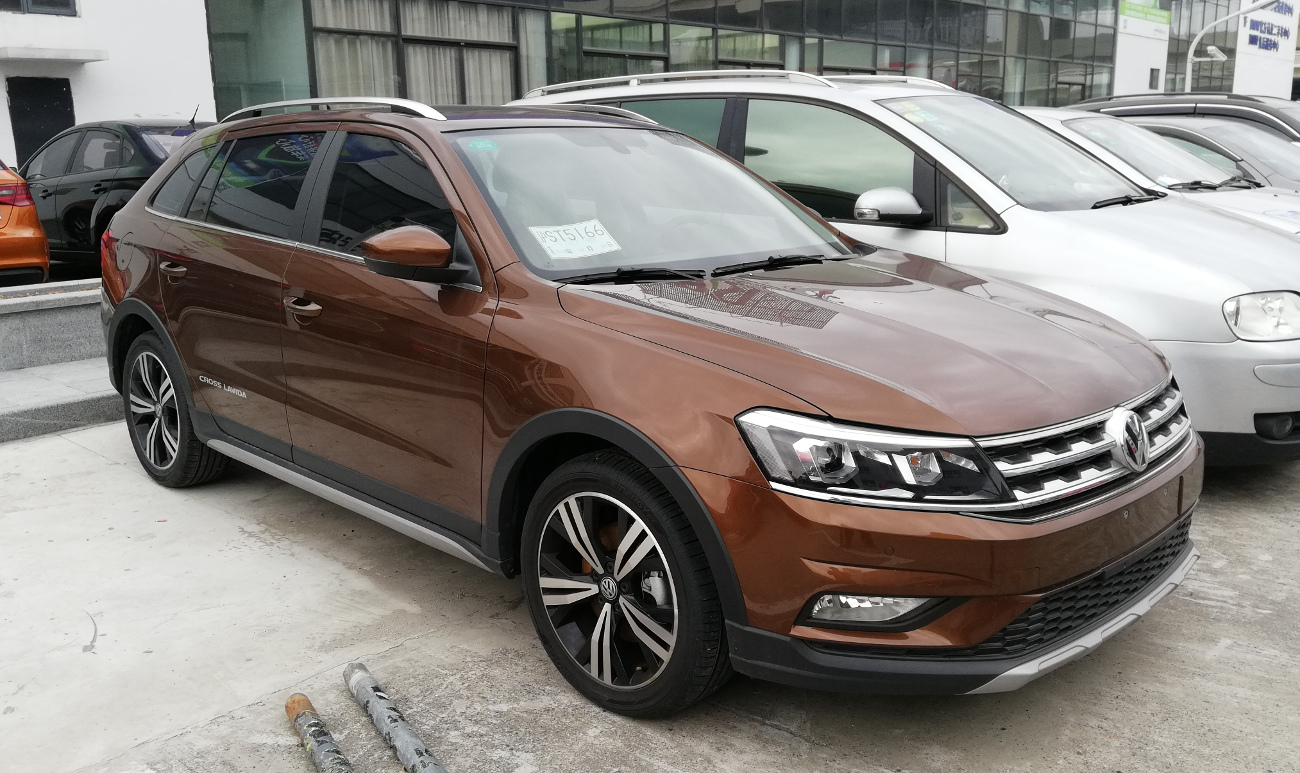
Volkswagen Cross Lavida (front, facelift)

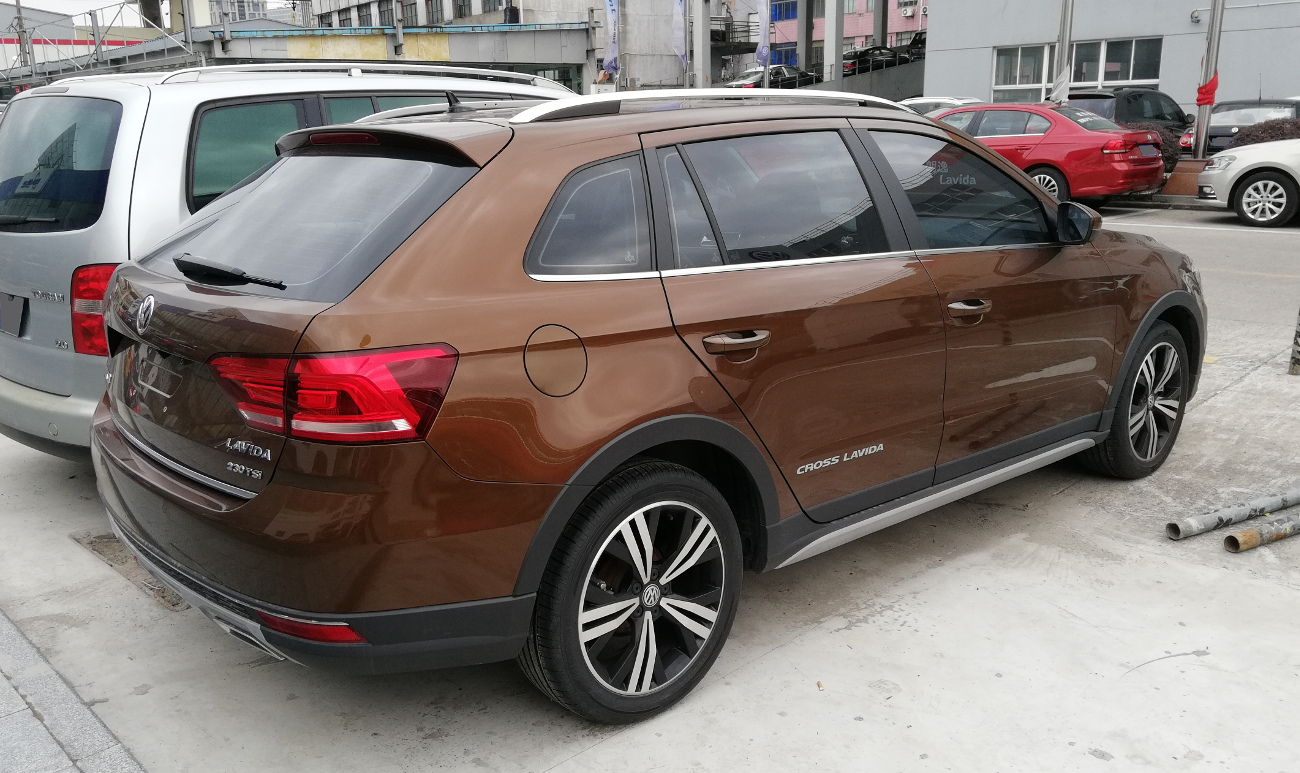
Volkswagen Cross Lavida (rear, facelift)

== Third generation (Typ 0C; 2018) ==
Third generation
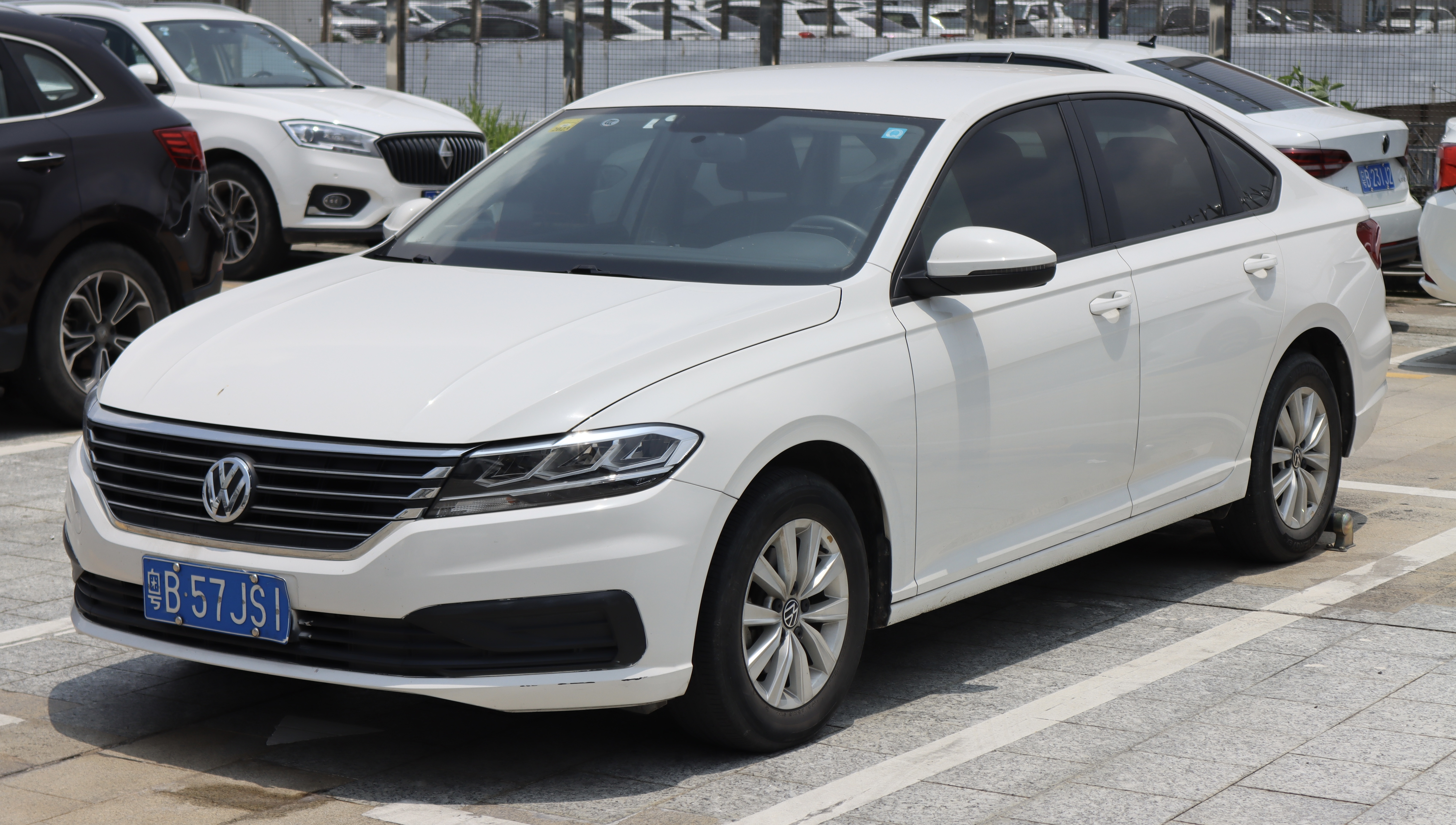

Overview
- Also called: Volkswagen Lavida Plus (Pre-launch)
- Production: 2018–present
- Assembly: China: Anting, Shanghai; Changsha, Hunan (SAIC-VW)

Body and chassis
- Body style: 4-door sedan 5-door station wagon
- Platform: Volkswagen Group MQB A1
- Related: Volkswagen Bora IV

Powertrain
- Engine: Petrol: 1.2 L 116 PS (85 kW; 114 hp) I4 TSI; 1.4 L EA211 131 PS (96 kW; 129 hp) I4 TSI; 1.5 L EA211 118 PS (87 kW; 116 hp) I4; 1.6 L EA211 105 PS (77 kW; 104 hp) I4
- Transmission: 5-speed manual 6-speed automatic

Dimensions
- Wheelbase: 2,688 mm (105.8 in)
- Length: 4,670 mm (183.9 in); 4,541 mm (178.8 in) (Gran Lavida)
- Width: 1,806 mm (71.1 in)
- Height: 1,474 mm (58.0 in); 1,488 mm (58.6 in) (Gran Lavida)

The third generation Lavida was launched at Auto China 2018 in Beijing, and is based on the Volkswagen Group MQB platform. At launch, it was equipped with two engine options, including the 1.5-litre petrol engine with 116 hp or the 1.4-litre TSI petrol engine with 150 hp, mated to a five-speed manual gearbox or a six-speed automatic gearbox. It also received an extended 78 mm wheelbase compared to the previous generation.

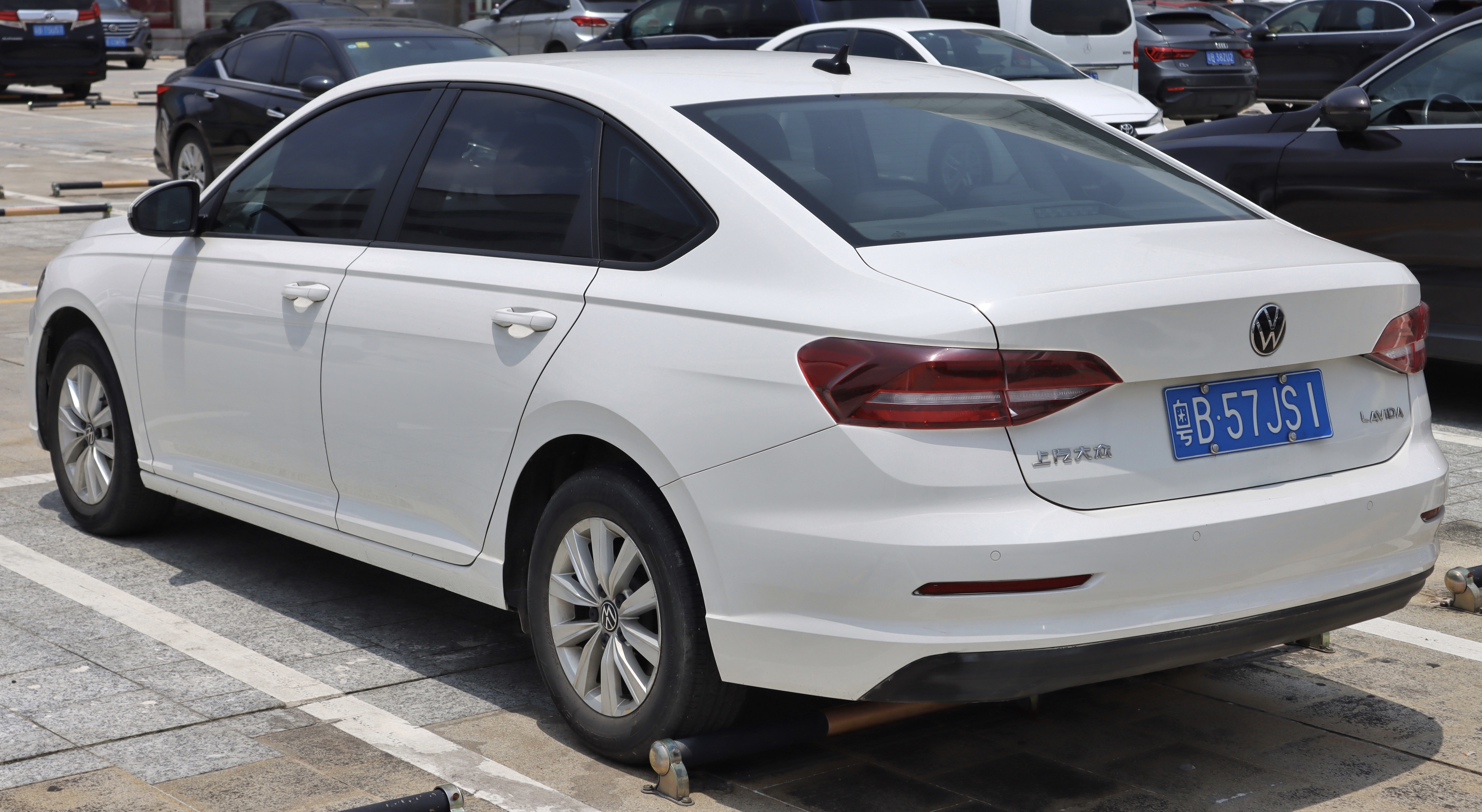
Rear view

From 2018 to 2019, the Gran Lavida compact estate model was also offered.

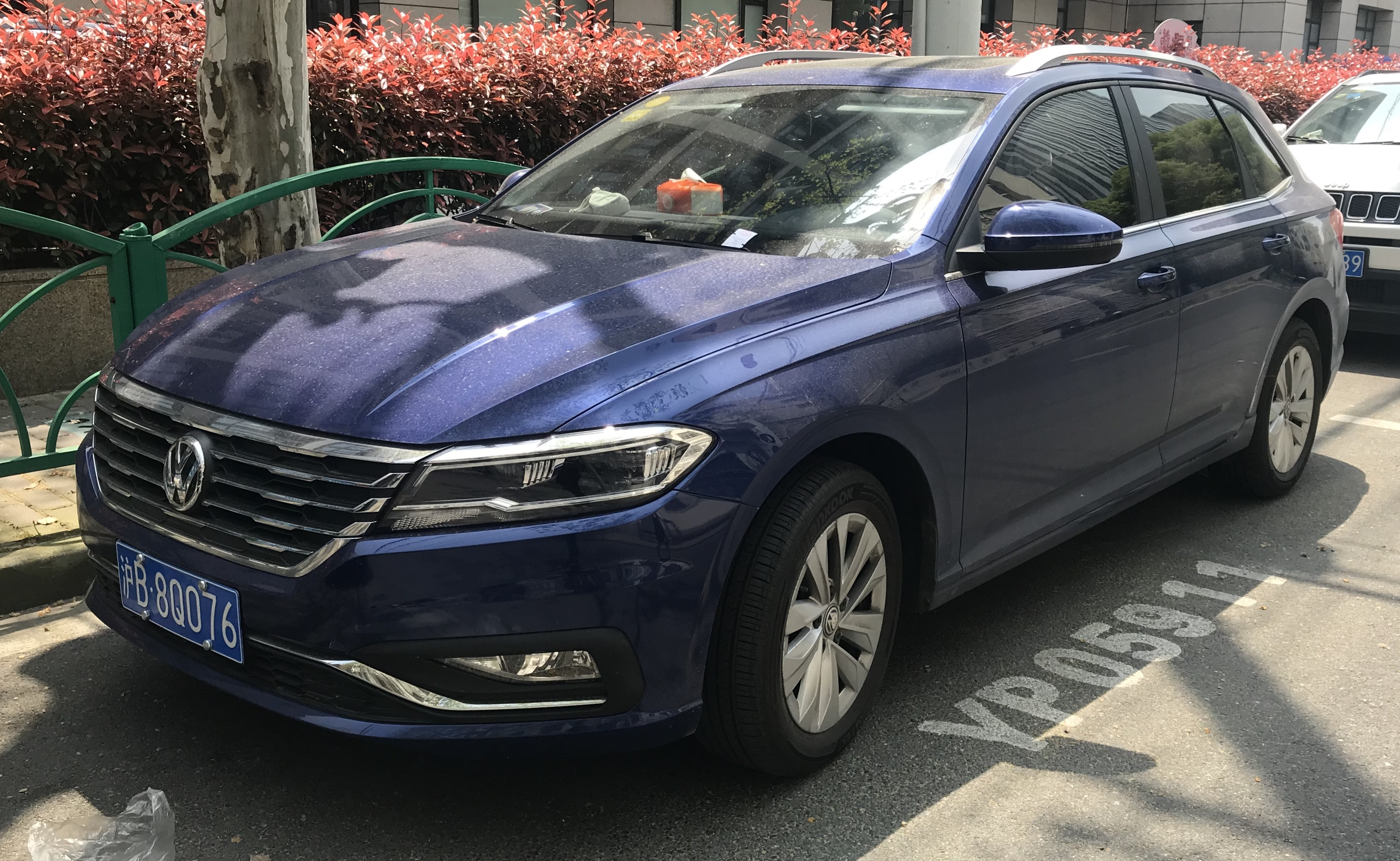
Volkswagen Gran Lavida 2018 (front)

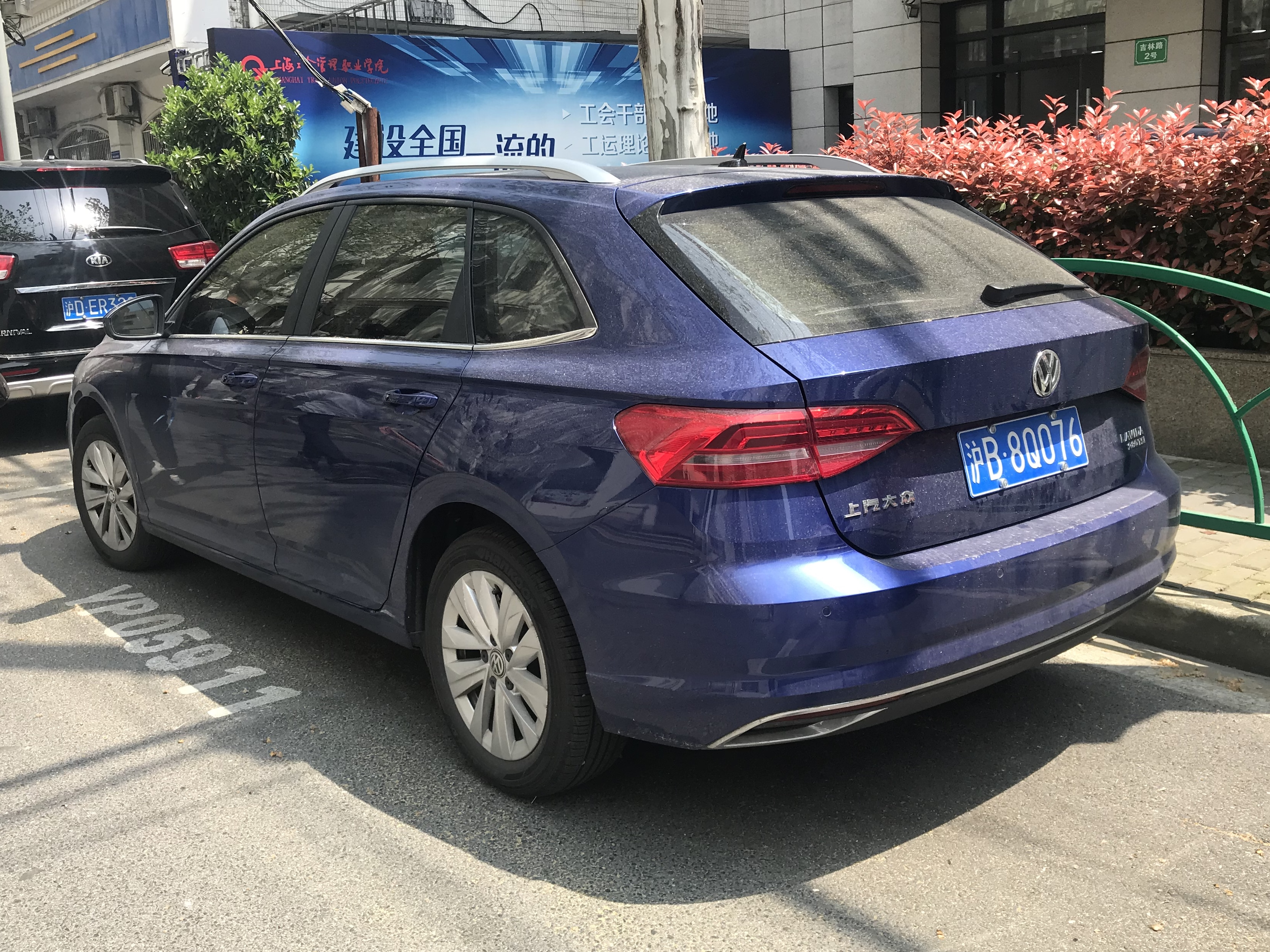
Volkswagen Gran Lavida 2018 (rear)

=== e-Lavida ===
An all-electric variant of the Lavida with a 38.1-kWh battery was introduced in 2019. It is made by the SAIC-Volkswagen joint venture.

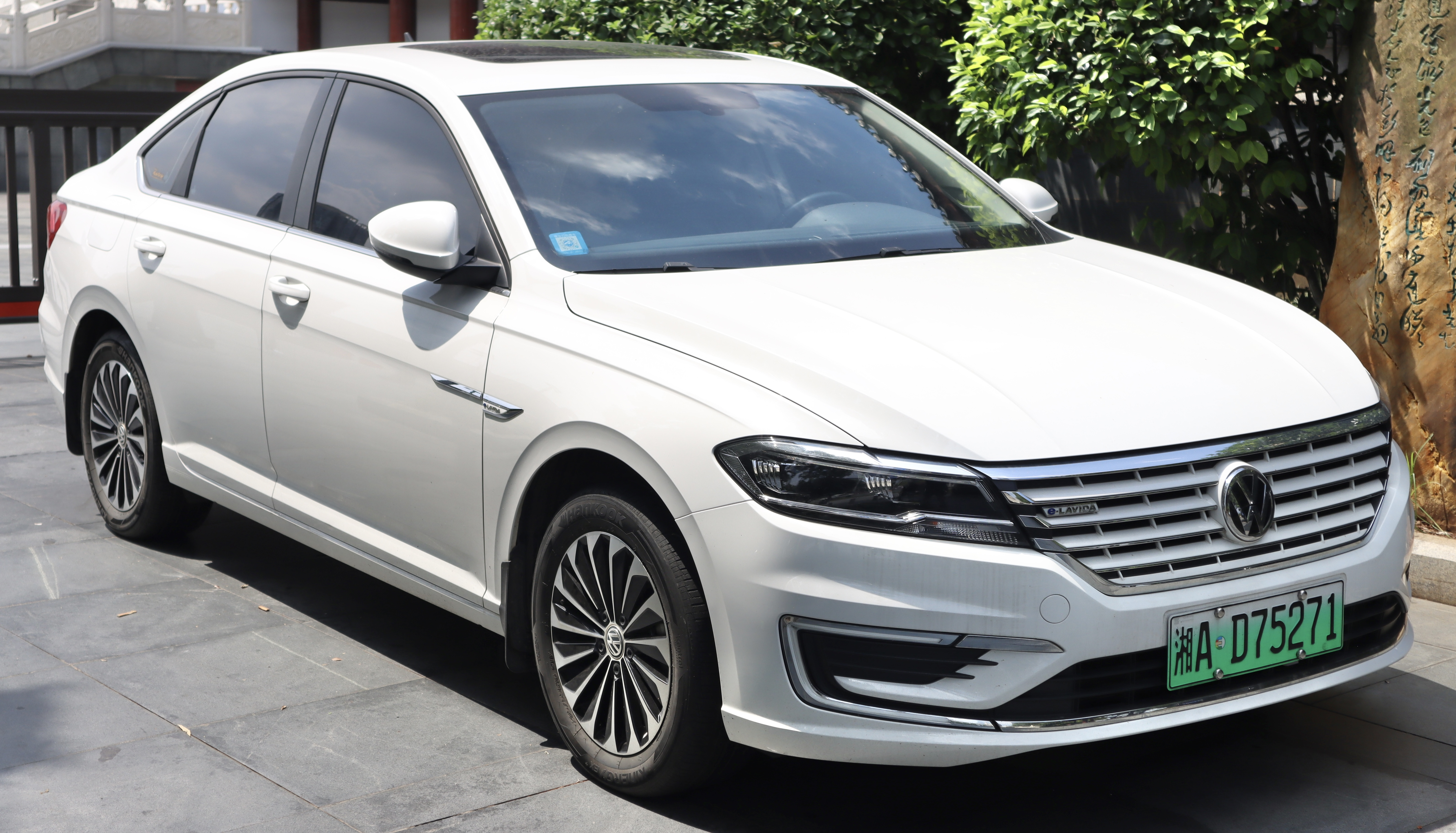
Volkswagen e-Lavida (electric)

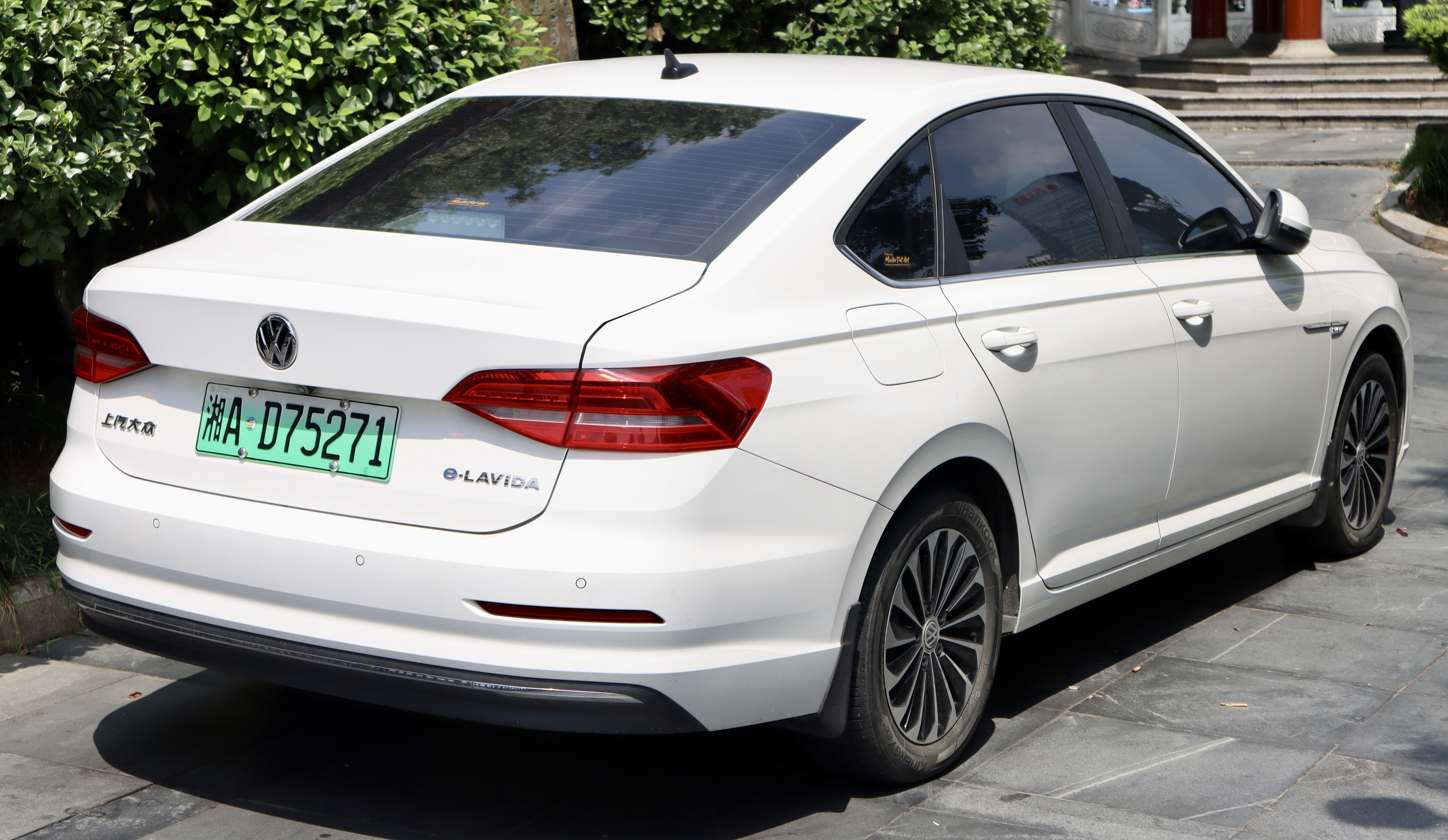
Rear view

=== 2022 facelift ===
The third generation Lavida received a facelift for the 2022 model year. The facelift includes a restyled front end and rear bumper with a slightly revised interior. The 280 TSI models are equipped with a 1.4-litre TSI engine with 150 hp, mated to a DSG gearbox, with a 1.5-litre engine producing 113 hp also available.

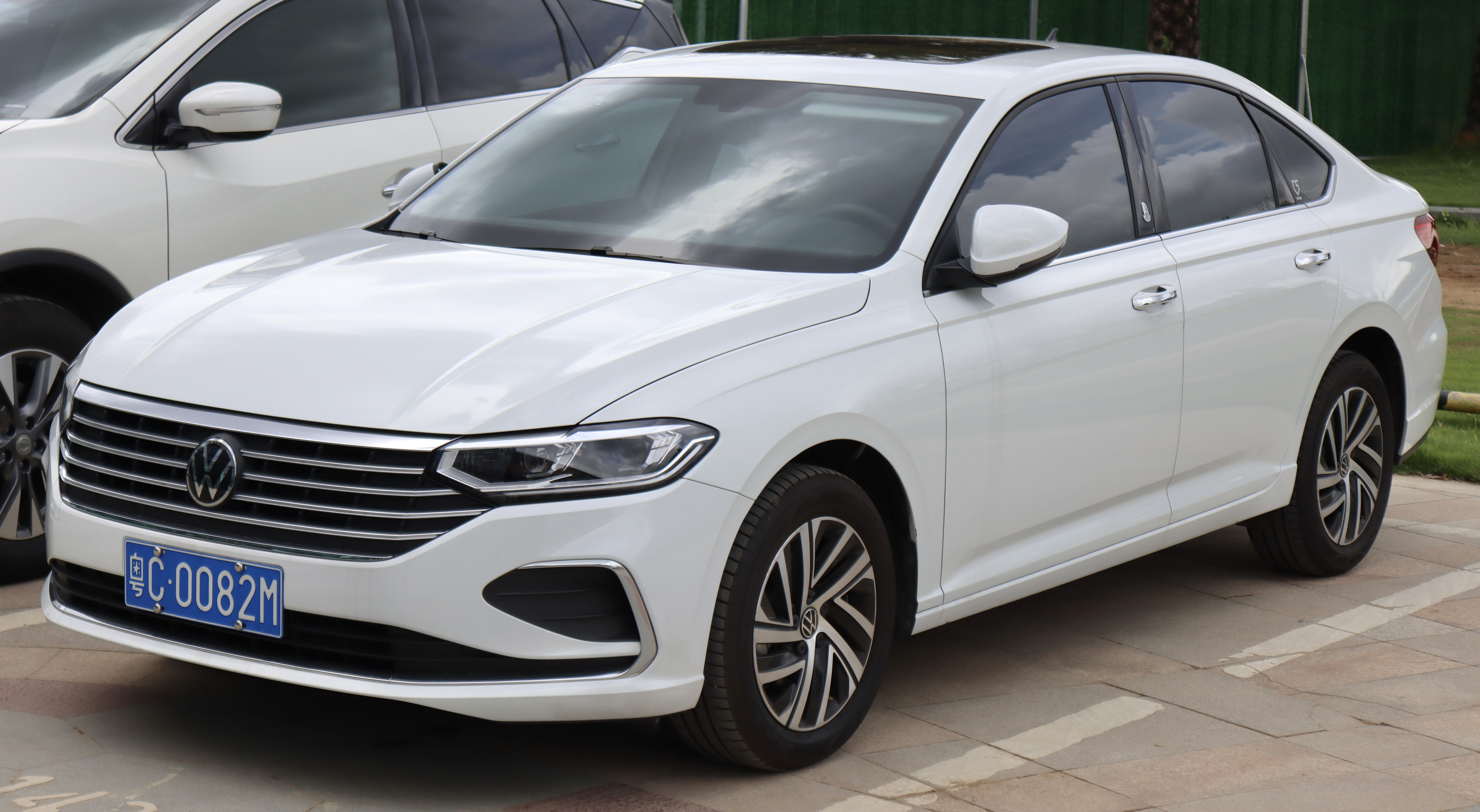
2022 facelift

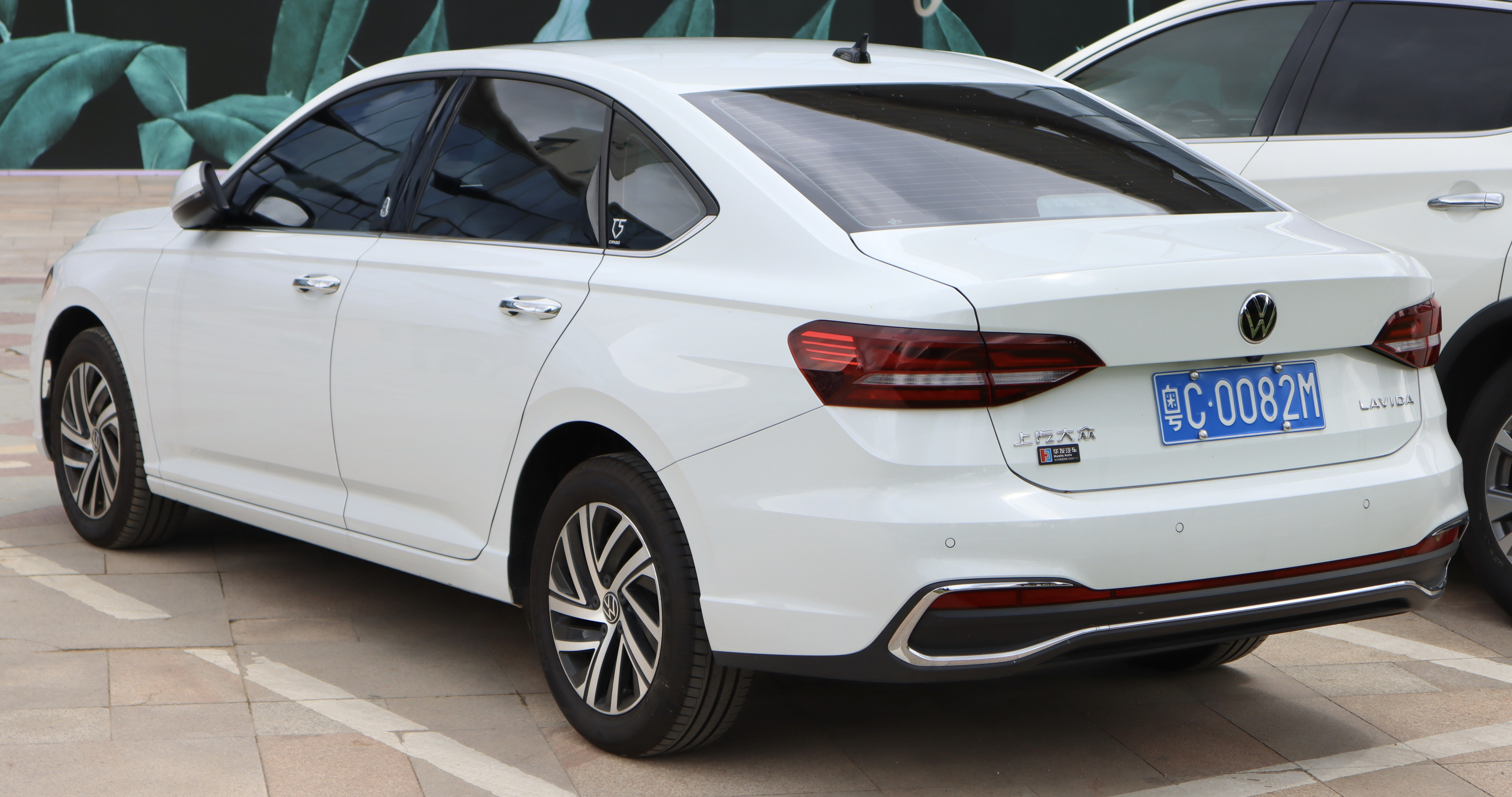
Rear view

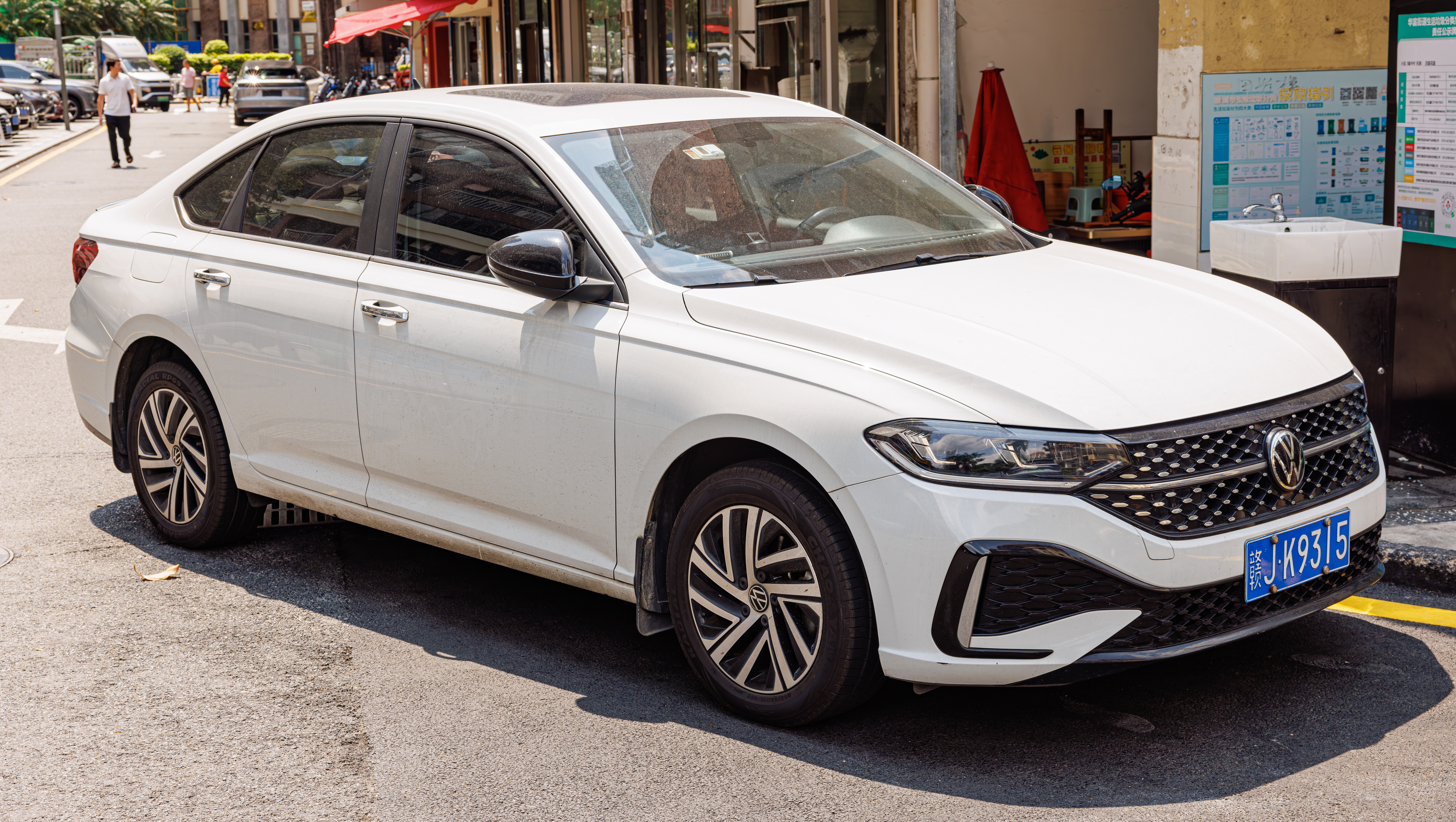
Starry Sky Elite Edition

== Fourth generation (Lavida Pro; 2025) ==
Volkswagen Lavida Pro
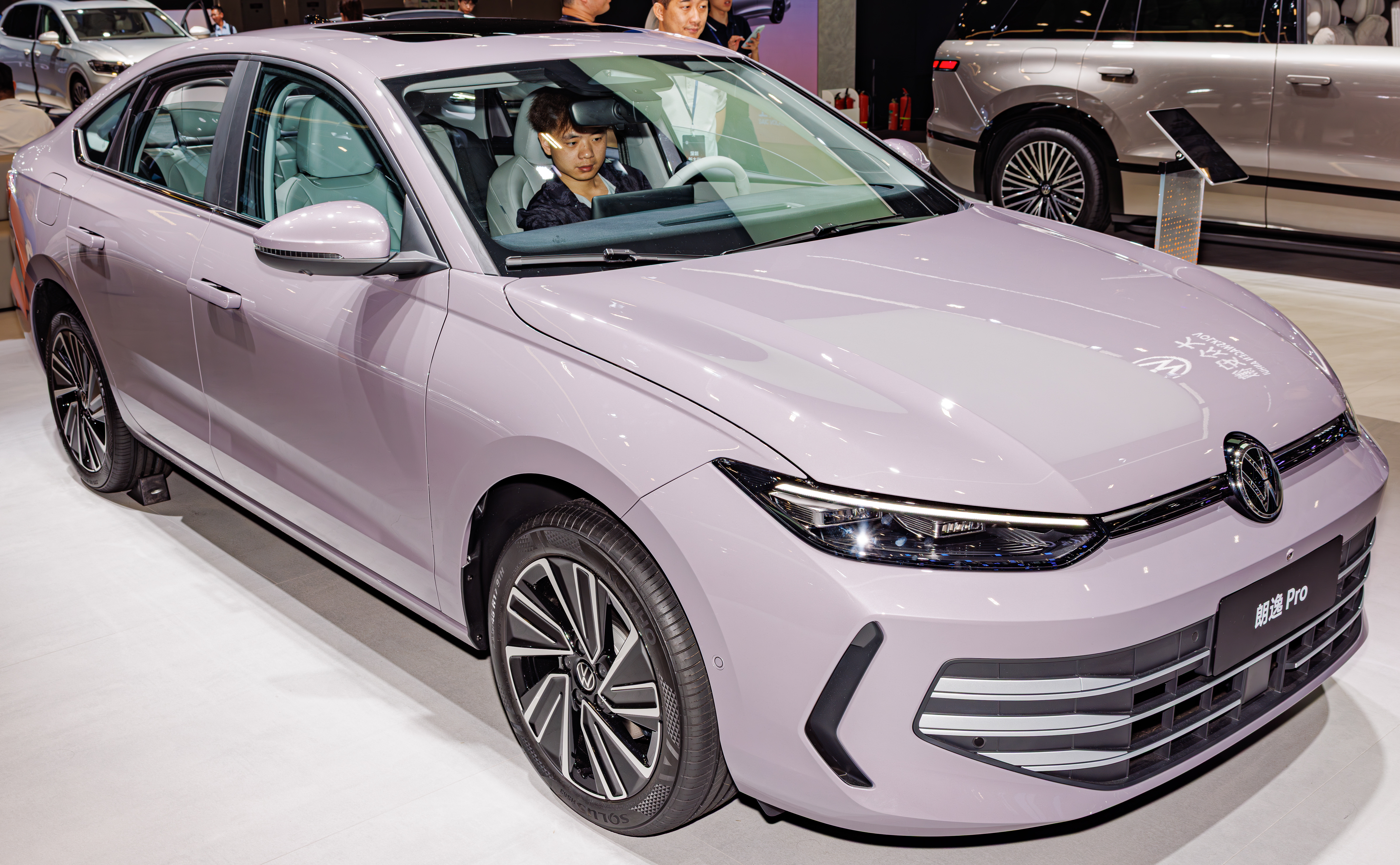
- 2026 Volkswagen Lavida

Overview
- Production: 2025–present
- Assembly: China: Anting, Shanghai; Changsha, Hunan (SAIC-VW)

Body and chassis
- Body style: 4-door sedan
- Platform: Volkswagen Group MQB Evo
- Related: Volkswagen Bora IV

Powertrain
- Engine: Petrol: 1.5 L EA211 160 PS (120 kW; 160 hp) I4; 1.5 L EA211 110 PS (81 kW; 110 hp) I4 TSI
- Transmission: 6-speed automatic 7-speed DCT

Dimensions
- Wheelbase: 2,688 mm (105.8 in)
- Length: 4,720 mm (185.8 in)
- Width: 1,806 mm (71.1 in)
- Height: 1,482 mm (58.3 in)

The fourth generation Lavida, dubbed the Lavida Pro, was launched on November 17, 2025. Continued to be based on the MQB Evo platform, the Lavida Pro was completely restyled and is longer in length.

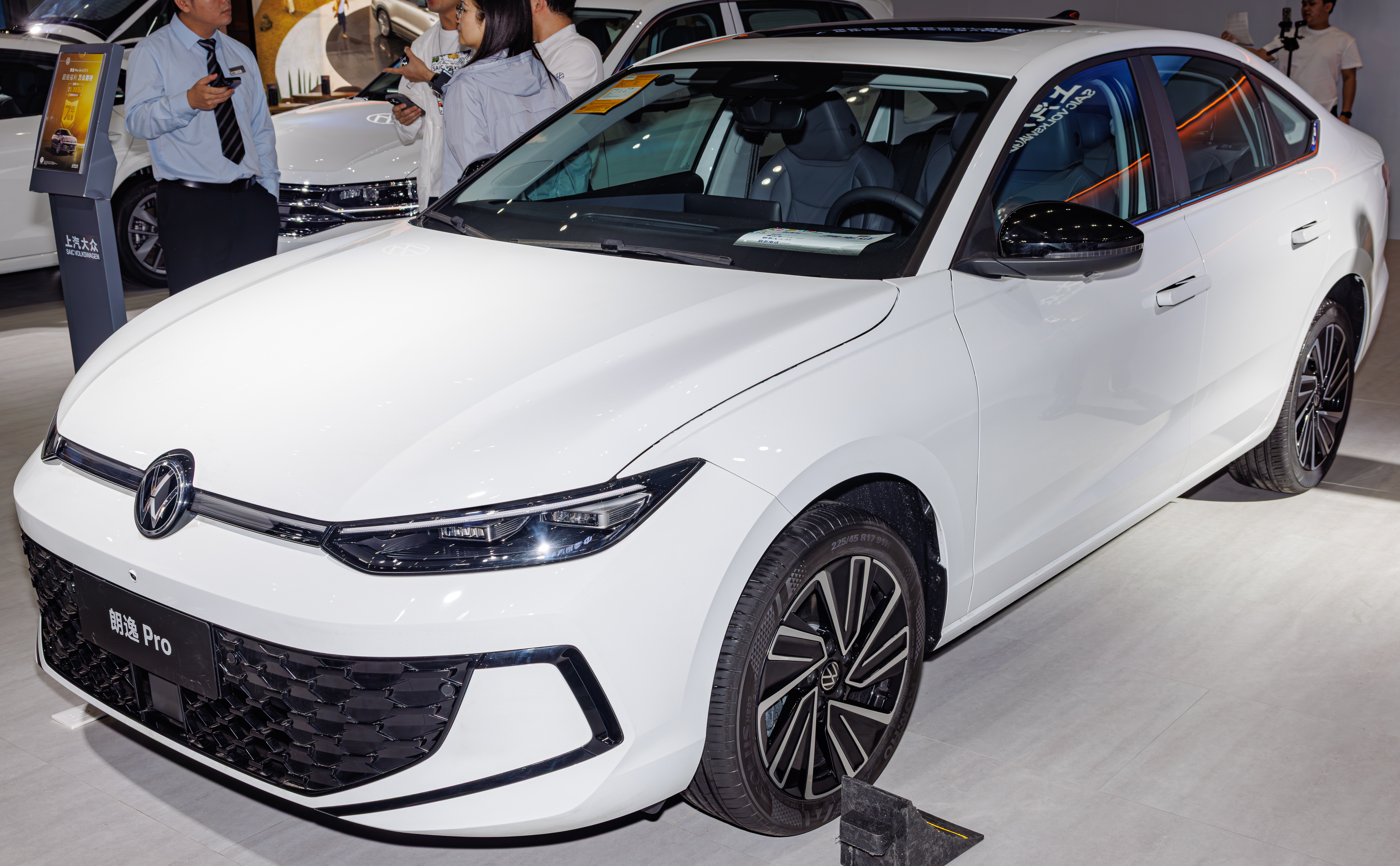
2026 Lavida Pro

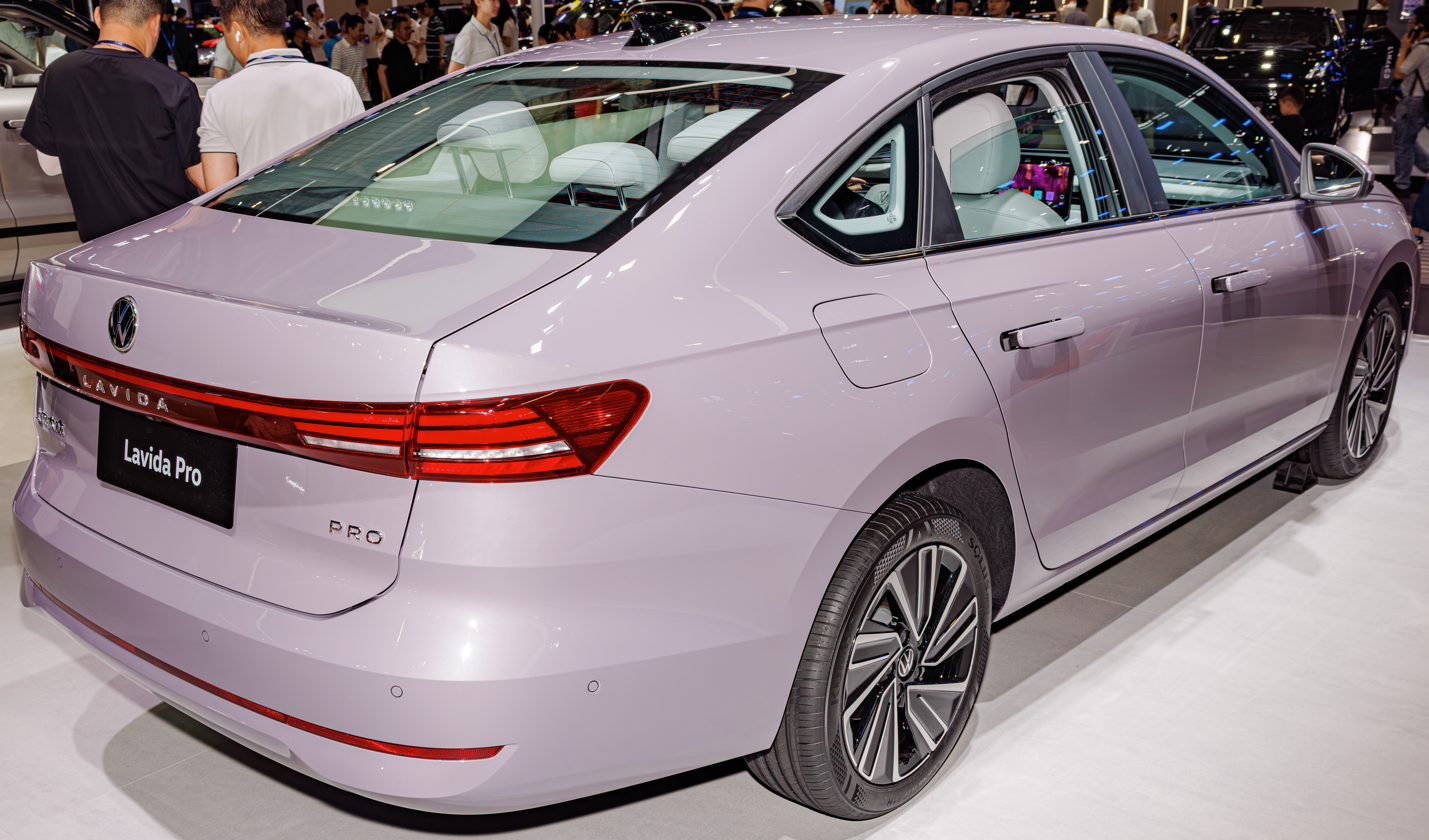
Lavida Pro rear

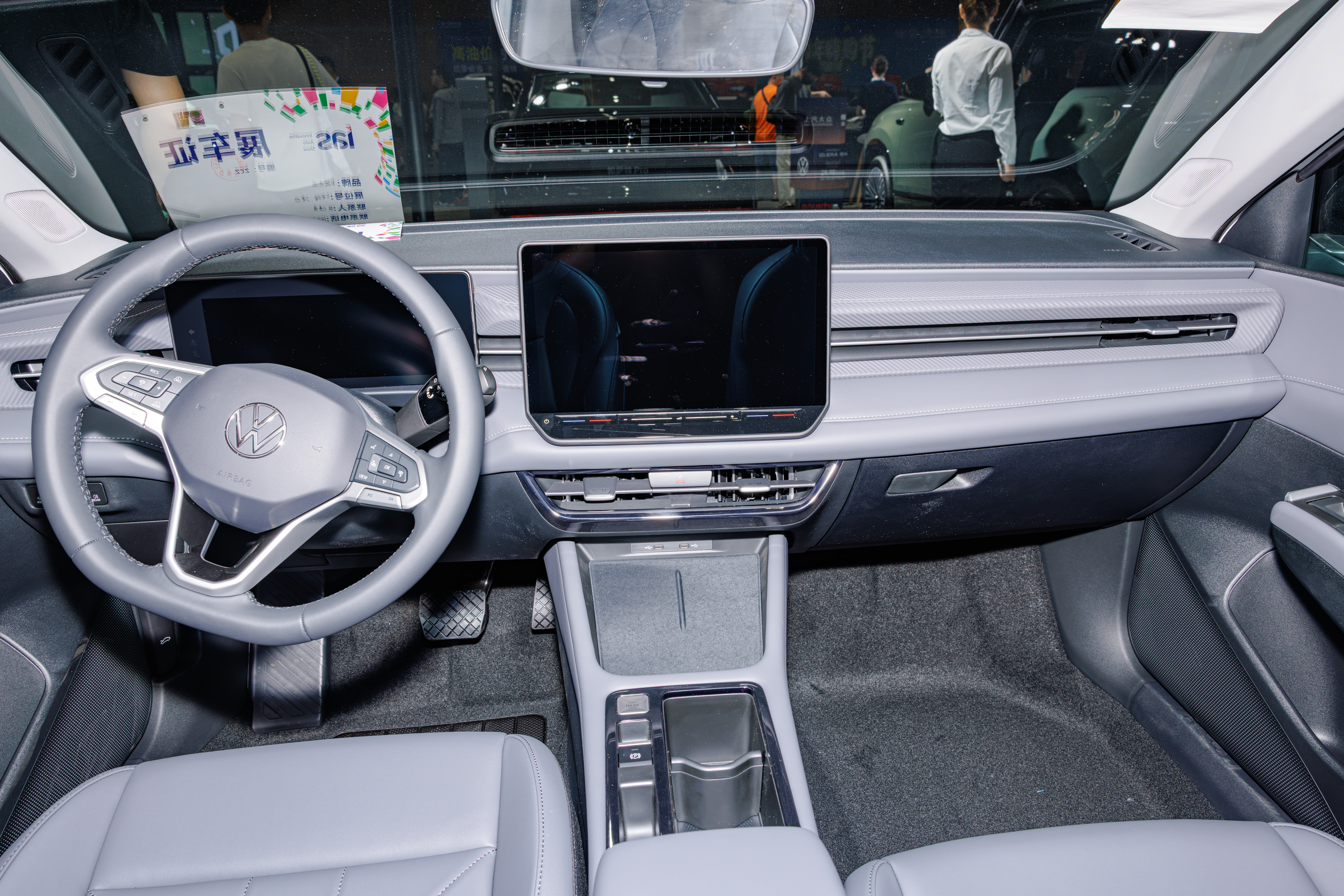
Lavida Pro Interior

== Lavida XR ==
The Volkswagen Virtus was introduced in June 2023 in China as the Lavida XR, sharing the nameplate with the larger and more advanced third generation Lavida sedan while targeting younger customers. It is mostly identical to the Virtus, with few changes such as a different grille pattern, chrome on the air intake on the front bumpers, and dark-tinted tail lights. It is powered by a 1.5-litre MPI engine producing 108 PS (79 kW; 107 hp) and 141 N⋅m (104 lb⋅ft) with a 6-speed automatic transmission. It replaced the second-generation Lavida and the Santana.

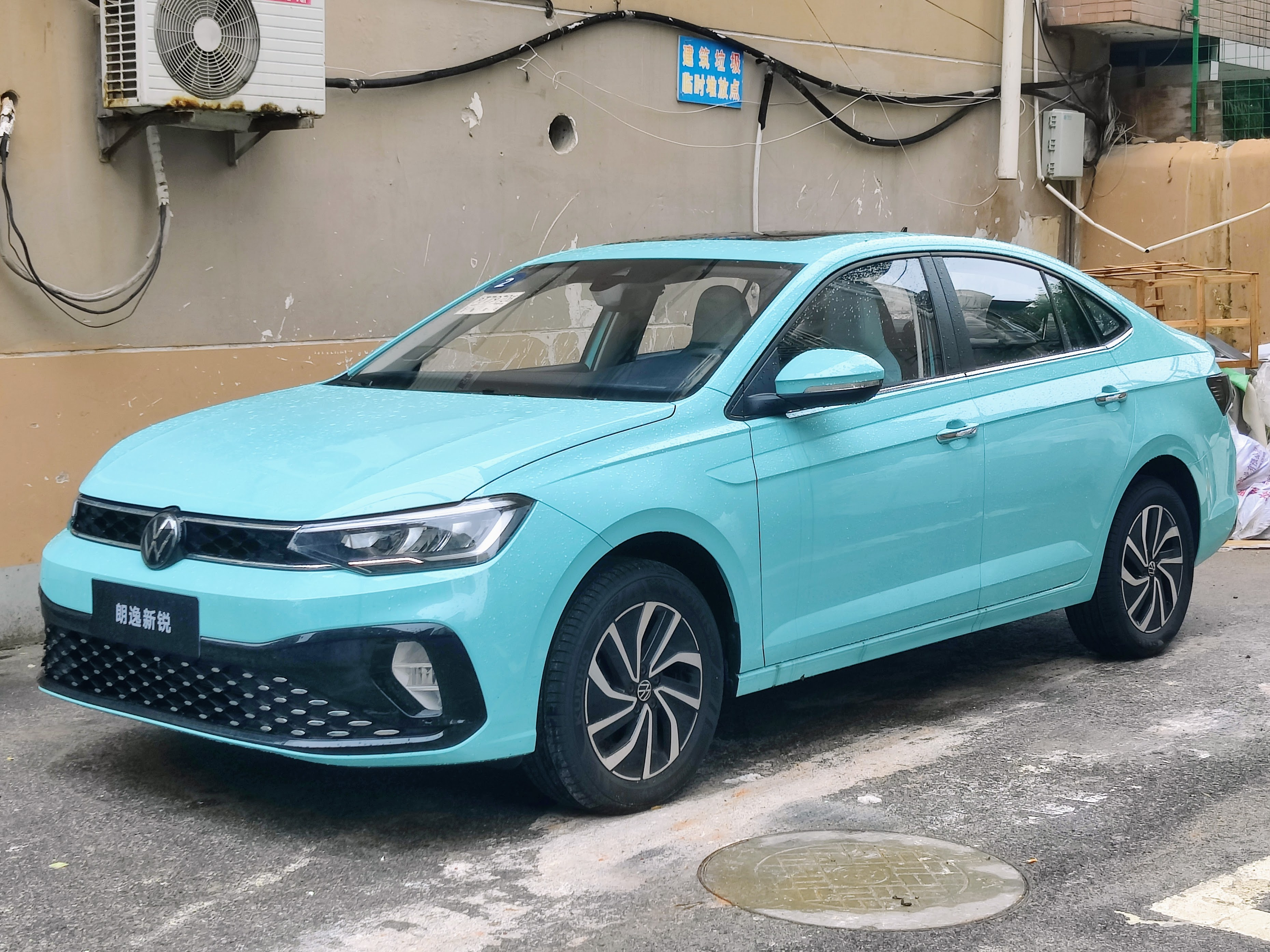
2023 Lavida XR

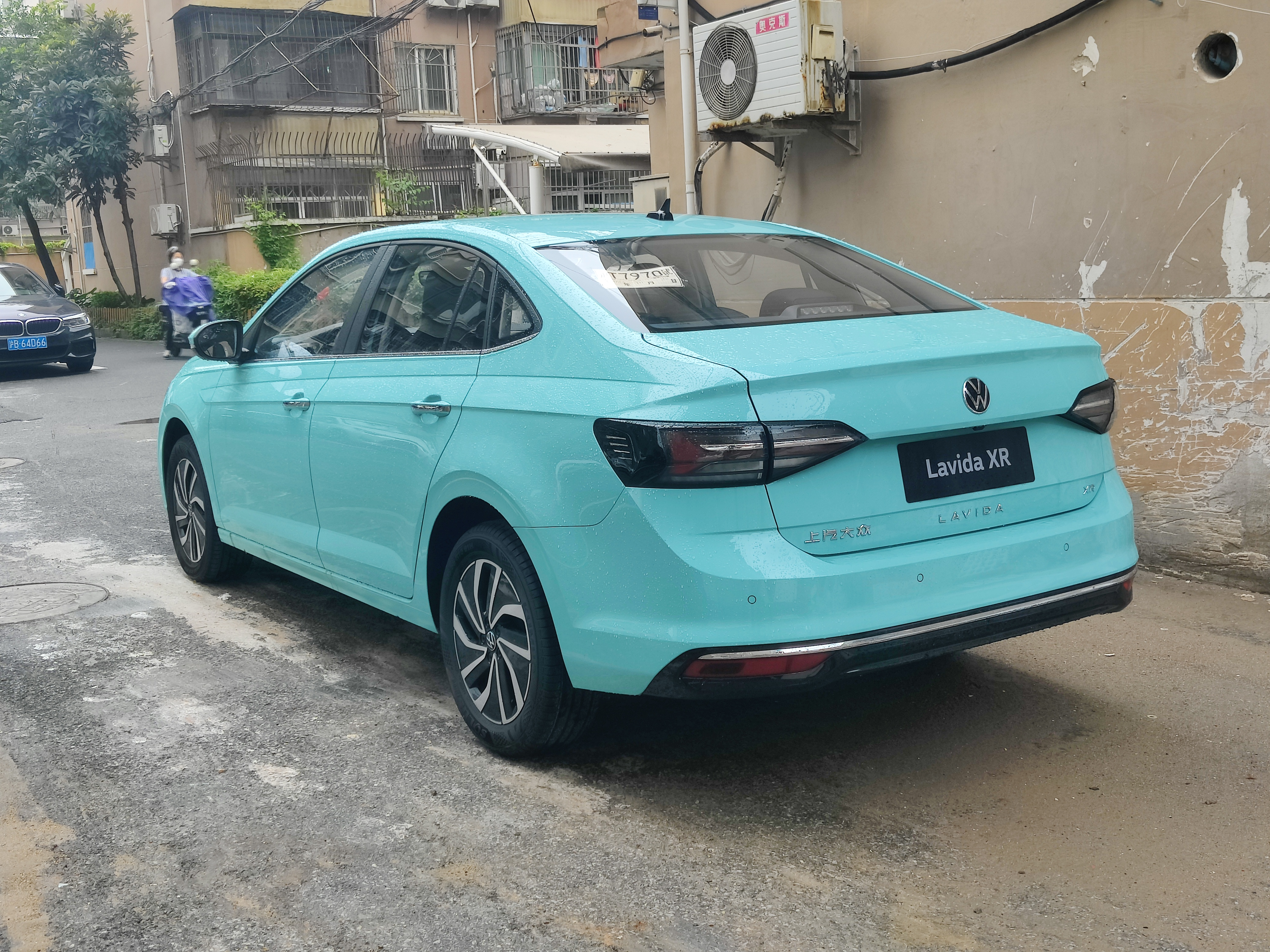
Rear view

== Sales ==
Year	China
2008	44,392
2009	146,455
2010	251,615
2011	247,475
2012	246,687
2013	374,056
2014	371,962
2015	379,069
2016	478,699
2017	461,061
2018	473,564
2019	533,186
2020	419,793
2021	393,496
2022	376,627
2023	351,931
2024	322,933

== See also ==
- Volkswagen Lamando L
