= Shanghai Auto Museum =

Automobile museum in Jiading, Shanghai, China

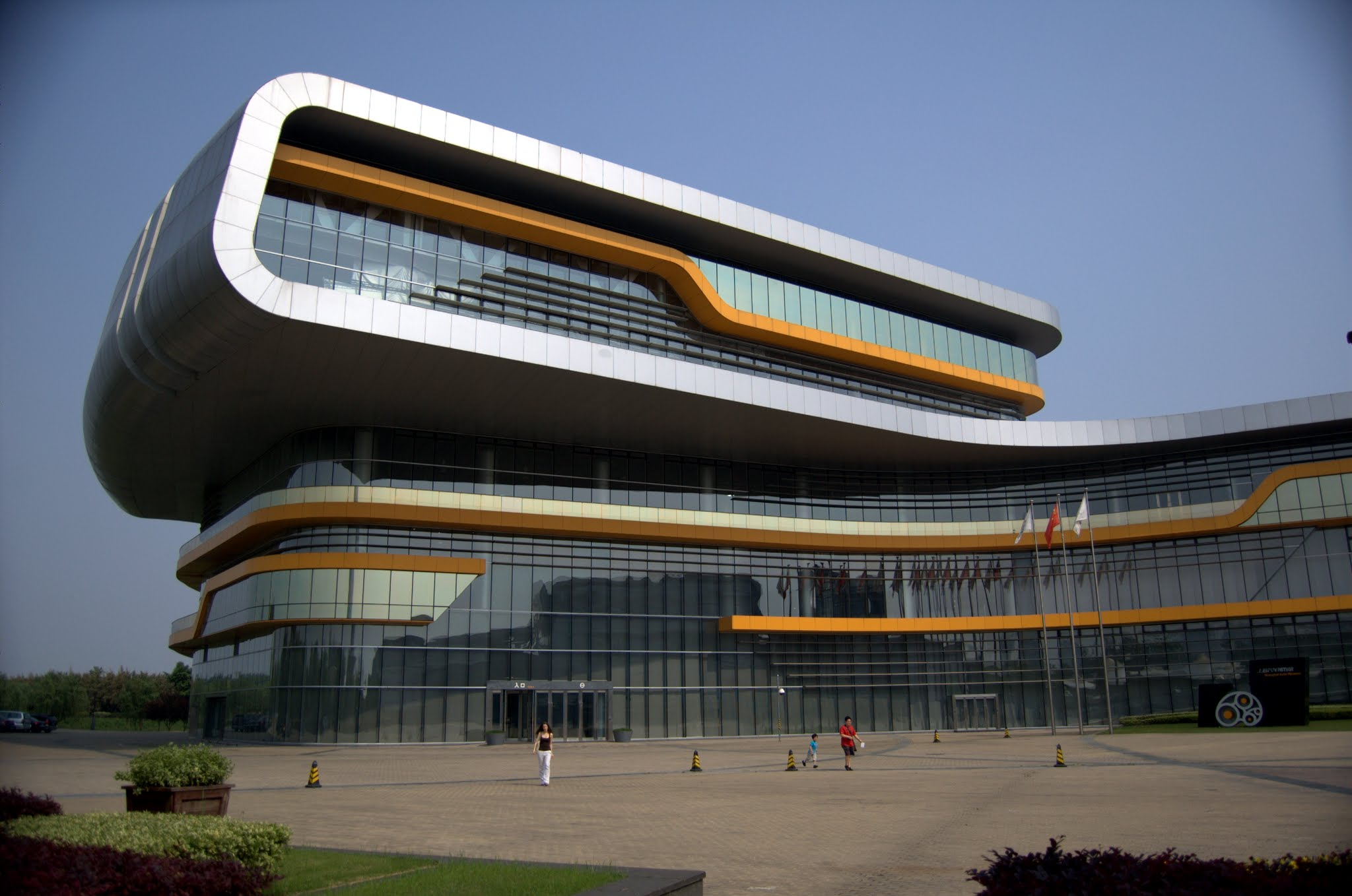

- Location within Shanghai
- Established: January 17, 2007; 19 years ago
- Location: Boyuan Road No. 7565; Anting Shanghai 201805; China
- Coordinates: 31°16′50″N 121°09′57″E
- Type: Automobile museum
- Website: Shanghai Auto Museum (in English)

Shanghai Auto Museum is an automobile museum located in Anting, Jiading District, Shanghai, China, in the Auto Expo Park of Shanghai International Automobile City. Designed by the Architectural Design & Research Institute of Tongji University and IFB from Germany, the museum opened to the public on January 17, 2007.

The museum is the first specialist museum of its kind in China. With a gross floor area of 28,000 square meters (300,000 sq ft) and an exhibition area of approximately 10,000 square meters (110,000 sq ft), it is divided into four sections: history, collection, exploration and temporary exhibitions respectively. The museum houses a collection of over 100 classic automobiles, representing nearly 50 brands from China and abroad, spanning 100 years of automobile history and development. The History Pavilion houses 27 cars representing milestones in automotive development. The Antique Car Pavilion contains 40 cars from 20 different manufacturers dating between 1900 and 1970. The Chinese and foreign car models on display include Fords, Fiat 500, Austin 7, Rover P5, Jaguar E-Type and a GM EV1.

== See also ==
- List of automobile museums
