= Anting =

Anting 安亭镇
- Town
- Location in Shanghai
- Coordinates: 31°17′18″N 121°09′44″E
- Country: People's Republic of China
- Municipality: Shanghai
- District: Jiading
- Village-level divisions: 20 residential communities 43 villages

Area
  - Total: 89.28 km^{2} (34.47 sq mi)
- Time zone: UTC+8 (China Standard)
- Postal code: 201805
- Area code: 0021

Anting (Chinese: 安亭; pinyin: Āntíng; lit. 'Pavilion of peace') is a town in Jiading District, Shanghai, bordering Kunshan, Jiangsu to the west. It has 96,000 inhabitants and, after the July 2009 merger of Huangdu (黄渡镇), an area of 89.28 km^{2} (34.47 sq mi).

== Overview ==
Anting is one of the centres of the Chinese automotive industry; it is home to Shanghai Automotive Industry Corporation and includes the German/Chinese joint venture: Shanghai Volkswagen Automotive. This enterprise has the largest market share of passenger cars in China.

The Shanghai International Circuit, China's first Formula One race track, is located near the town, a 15-minute drive away. The Shanghai Auto Museum is also located here, on Boyuan Road.

== Subdivisions ==
As of 2011, Anting is divided into 20 residential communities (社区) and 43 villages, among the most well-known of which is Tamiao (塔庙村), which is nicknamed the "Auto City". In the southern part of town, an extension of "Anting Auto City" called "Anting New Town" (安亭新镇) is being built in the fashion of "Anting German Town" (安亭德国镇). Anting New Town was developed through the One City, Nine Towns initiative and was the site where construction via the initiative first began.

=== German Town ===
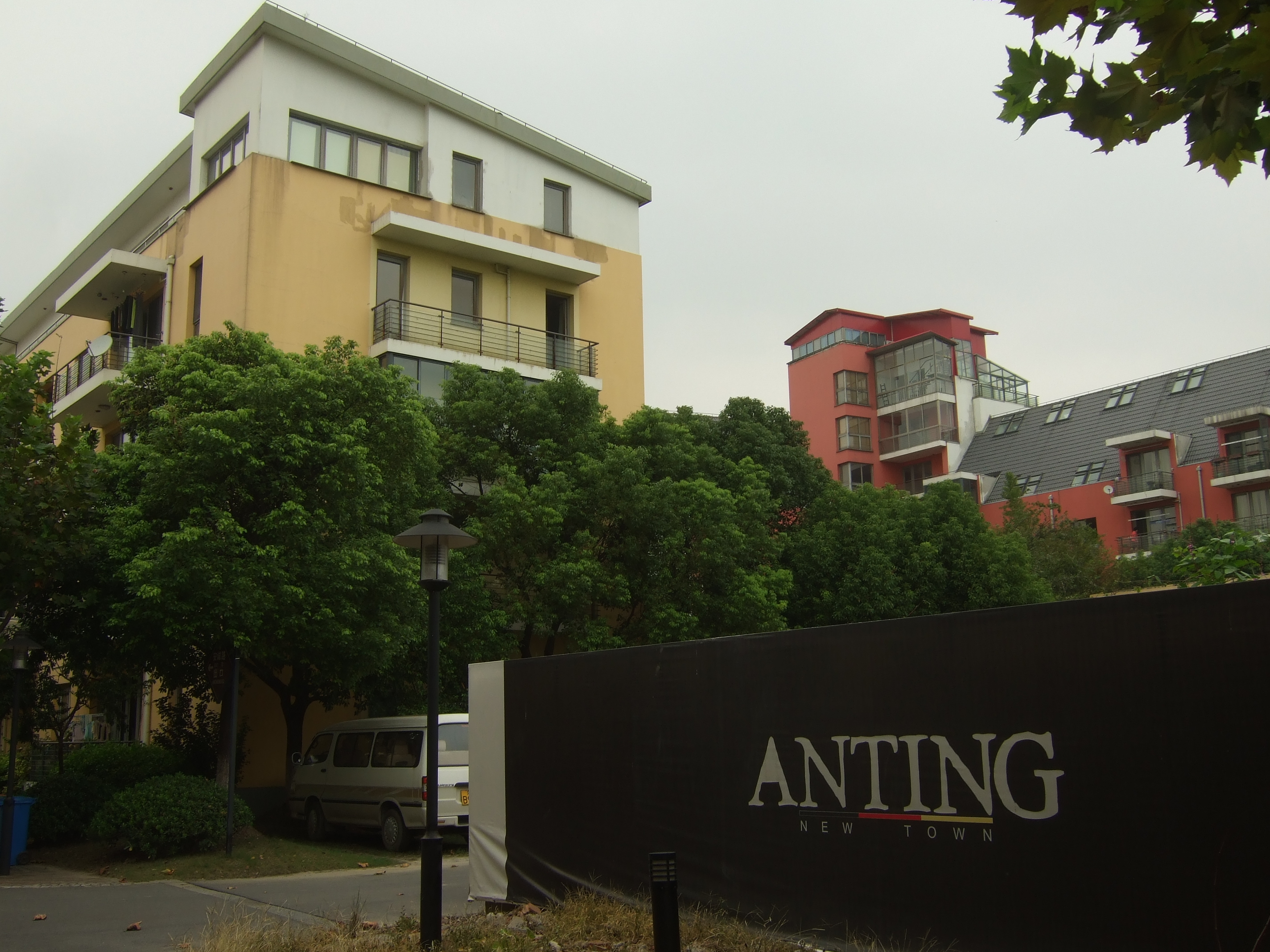
Anting New Town

Anting New Town combines a modern German urban style with a block layout. From the central European design tradition, it incorporates winding streets and enclosed plazas. The district was designed by Frankfurt-based architecture firm Albert Speer & Partners (AS+P). Prior to its selection of a German theme, the area already had links to Germany due to the presence of Volkswagen's largest joint venture in China.

Oktoberfest and other German holidays are celebrated as community events.

== Transportation ==
Anting is served by Line 11 of the Shanghai Metro, connected to the Lifehub shopping center Anting Station. Anting North Railway Station is on the Shanghai–Nanjing Intercity Railway.

== Accommodation ==
The first 5* International hotel, Crowne Plaza Shanghai Anting Golf, opened in Anting, Jiading District on 4 September 2012. It is located at 6555 Boyuan Road.

== Entertainment ==
Lifehub@Anting, an entertainment complex located just beside the Metro Line 11, provides numerous Clothing outlets, local and international restaurants and coffee shops, a supermarket, film theatre, etc.

== See also ==
- List of township-level divisions of Shanghai
