= Crowne Plaza Shanghai Anting Golf =

Hotel in Shanghai, China

- Logo

- Facade

- Location within Shanghai
- Hotel chain: Crowne Plaza Hotels & Resorts

General information
- Location: Shanghai, China, No. 6555 Boyuan Road, Jiading District Shanghai, 201804
- Coordinates: 31.2722°N 121.1915°E
- Opening: 4 September 2012
- Management: InterContinental Hotels Group

Technical details
- Floor count: 8

Other information
- Number of rooms: 415
- Number of suites: 149
- Number of restaurants: 3

Website
- Official site

Crowne Plaza Shanghai Anting Golf is a hotel in the city of Shanghai, China. It is known for being the first five-star international hotel in the district of Jiading.

It is a 415-room hotel located at No. 6555 Boyuan Road. It has an 18-hole golf course. Time Out Shanghai said, "The traditional business hotel décor is also livened up with quirky Weibo-worthy design touches that will have you whipping out your camera – think a giant-size arm chair that can fit four and matching cigar in the lounge bar and a family of brass ducks taking a walk through the lobby."
