= Volkswagen Sagitar =

Small family car manufactured by FAW-Volkswagen

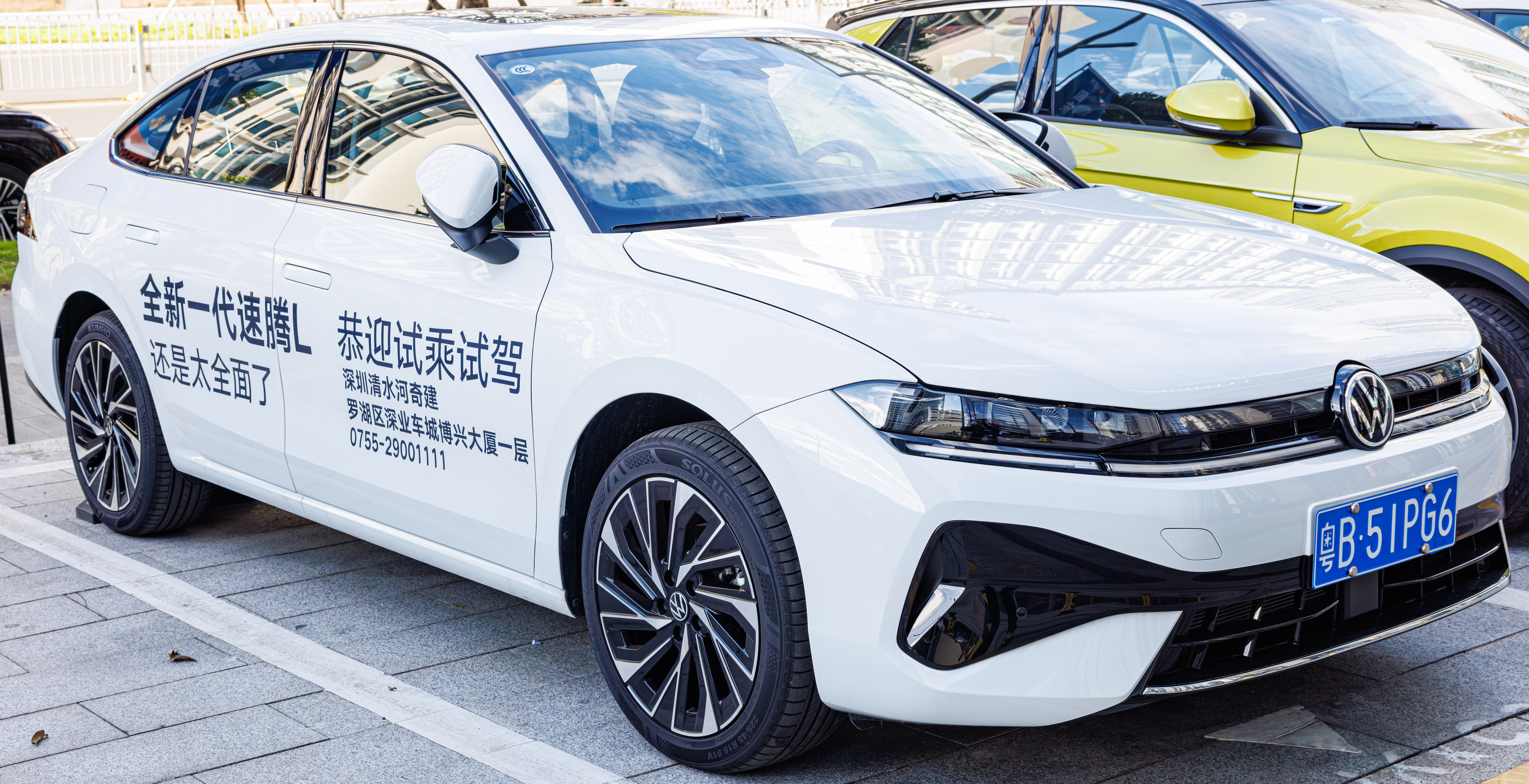

Overview
- Manufacturer: Volkswagen
- Also called: Volkswagen Jetta
- Production: 2006–present
- Assembly: China: Chengdu (FAW-VW)

Body and chassis
- Class: Compact car (C)
- Body style: 4-door sedan
- Layout: Front-engine, front-wheel-drive

The Volkswagen Sagitar (Chinese: 大众速腾; pinyin: Dàzhòng Sùténg) is a compact sedan produced by FAW-Volkswagen since 2006. The first 2 generations largely followed the design of the global Jetta, using the A5 (PQ35) platform from Mk5 to Mk6. For the Mk7 version, the Sagitar is still similar to the global Jetta (using the MQB A1 platform) except with a longer wheelbase of 2731mm.

Starting from the third known Jetta generation, the global market Jetta was known as the Sagitar in China and has been produced since April 2006. The Sagitar name was used for the fifth, sixth and seventh generation Jetta as FAW-Volkswagen already used the Jetta name on one of its models.

According to Carsalesbase.com, the Sagitar has had 2.8 million units sold in China as of 2019.

== First generation (A5, Typ 1K5; 2006) ==
For the Mk1 Sagitar, a 1.6 litre engine was standard alongside a 1.8 litre turbo and 2 litre engine. The 2.0 litre was removed in 2009 to make way for a 1.4-litre turbocharged engine. Available gearboxes were a 5-speed manual, 6-speed automatic, and 7-speed dual-clutch automatic transmission.

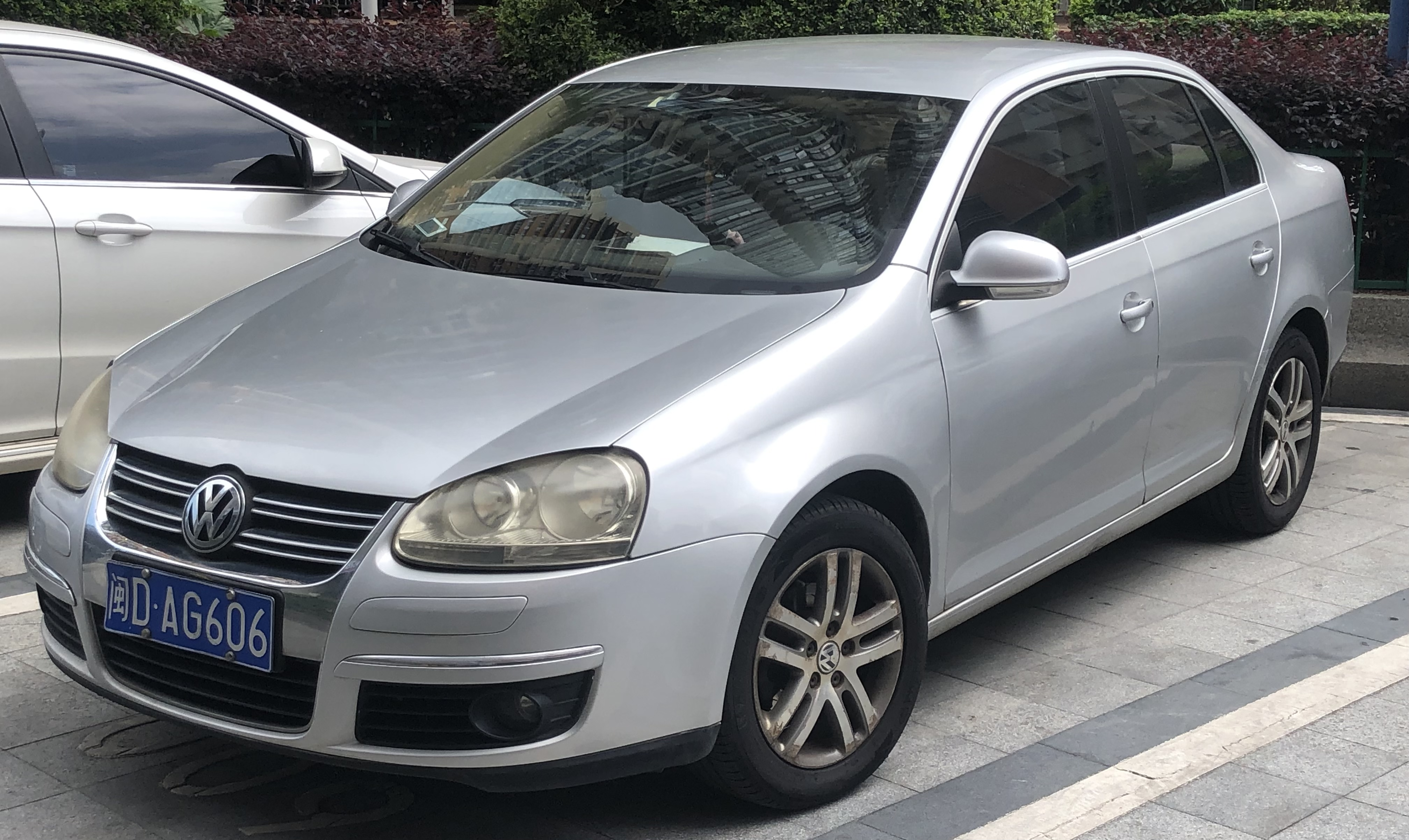
Volkswagen Sagitar I

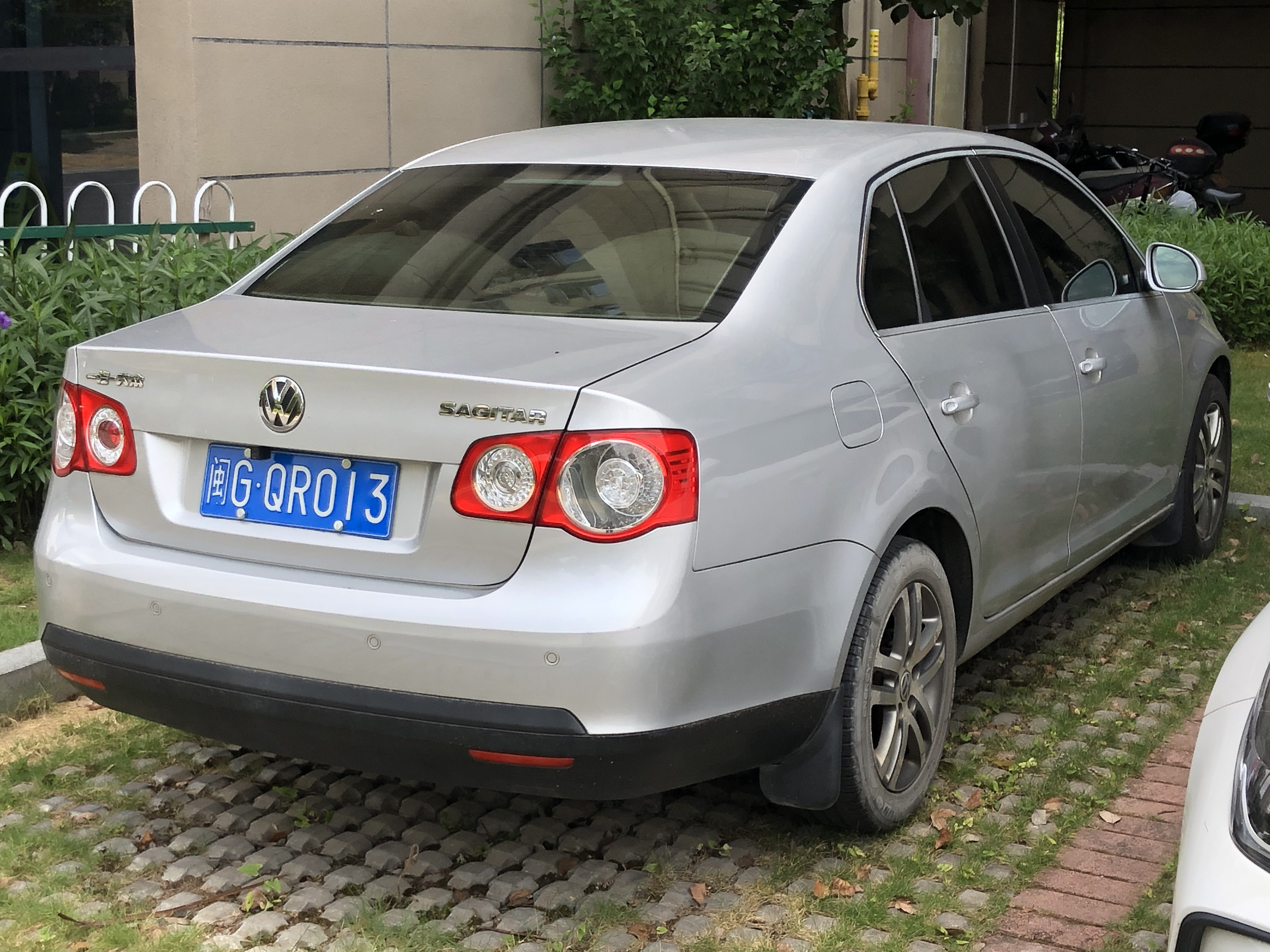
Rear

== Second generation (A6, Typ 5C6; 2012) ==
The Mk2 Sagitar entered the market in March 2012. The Sagitar was available with the 1.4 litre turbo and 1.6 litre engine paired with a 5-speed manual gearbox for both engines, a 6-speed automatic gearbox for 1.6 models, and a 7-speed dual-clutch automatic for 1.4 models. 1.8 TSI models were available for 2014 followed by the 2.0 litre TSI for 2016 and 1.2 TSI for 2017 and 2018. The 2.0 litre TSI engine and 6-speed DSG combination are standard on Sagitar GLi models while the 1.4 litre turbo with the 7-speed dual-clutch gearbox is available on Sagitar R-Line models. The Mk2 Sagitar ended production in September 2019.

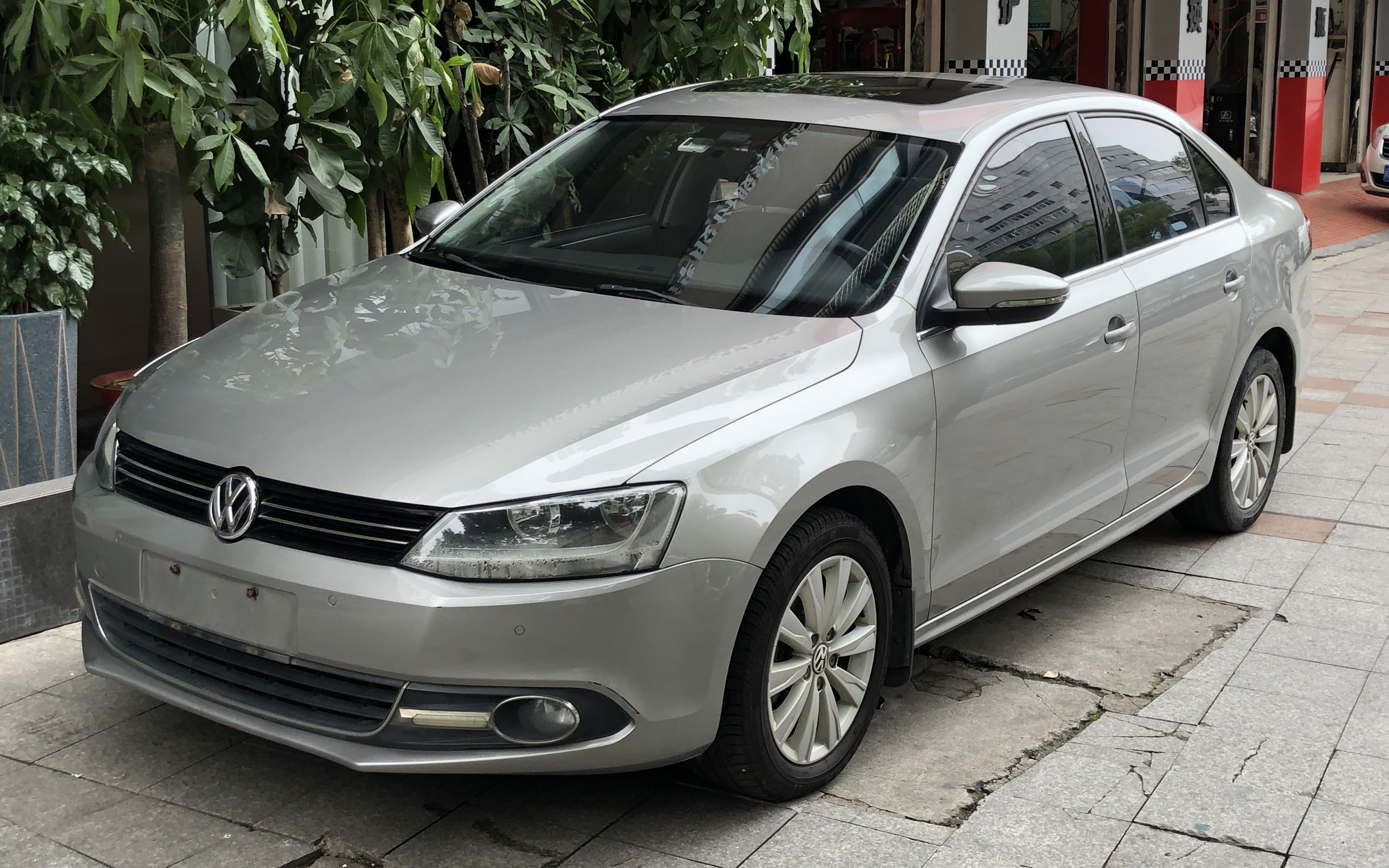
Volkswagen Sagitar II

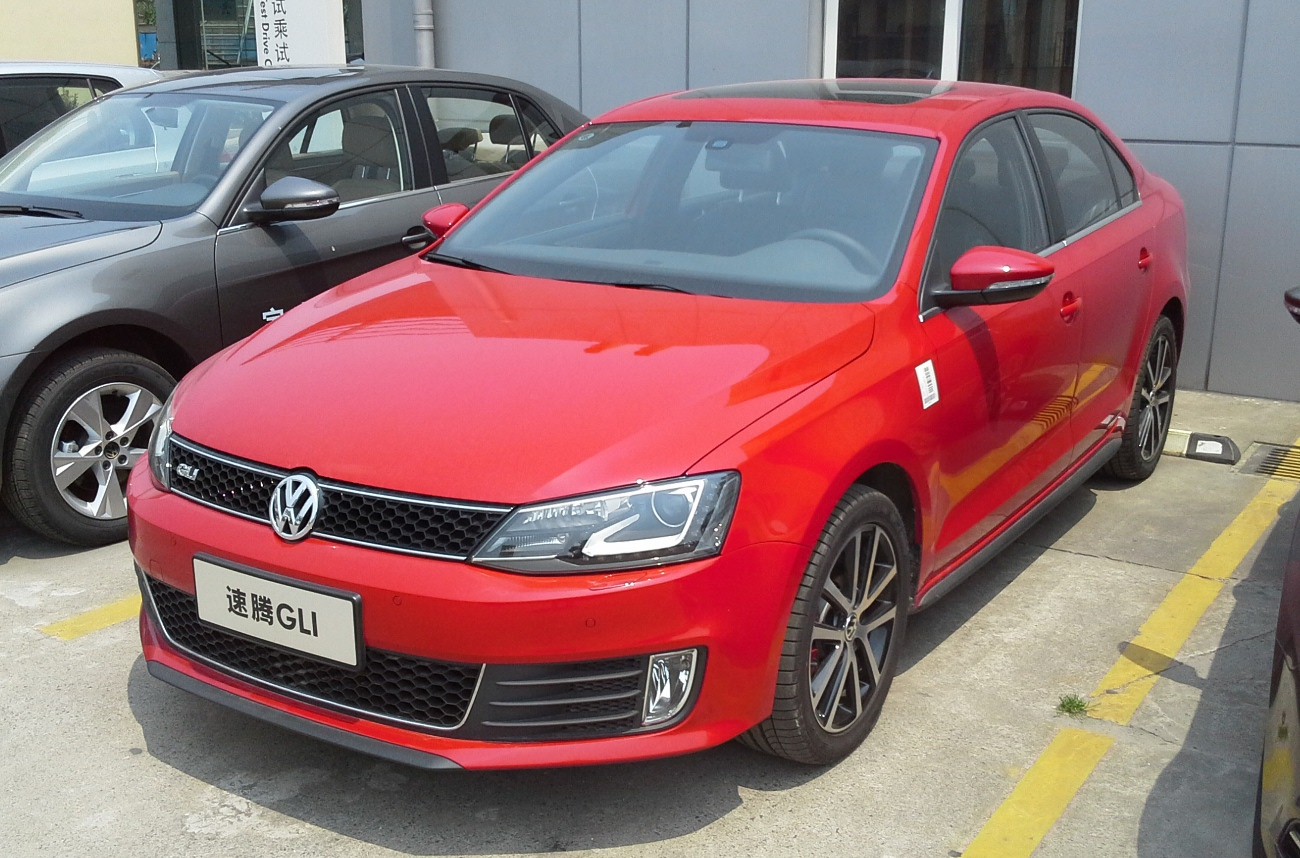
Volkswagen Sagitar II GLI

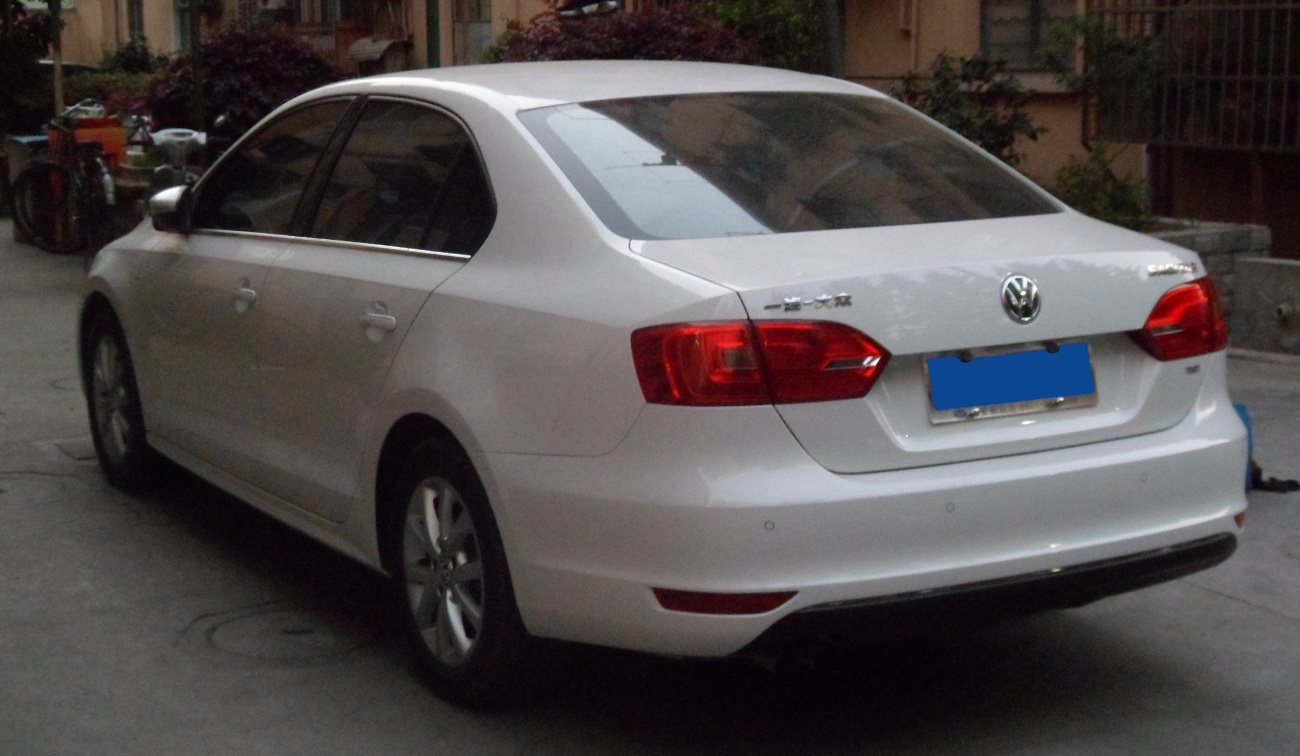
Rear
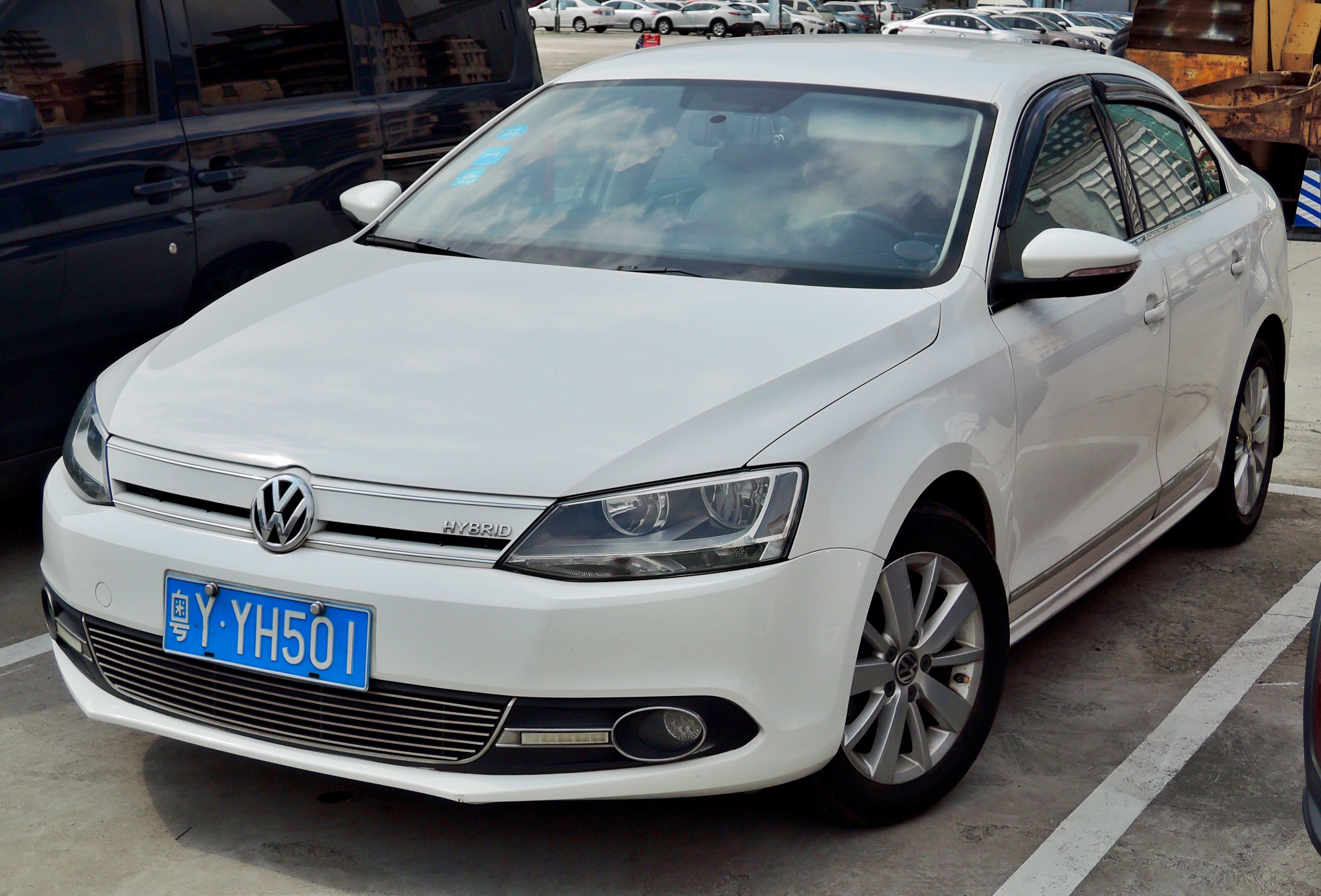
Volkswagen Sagitar Hybrid

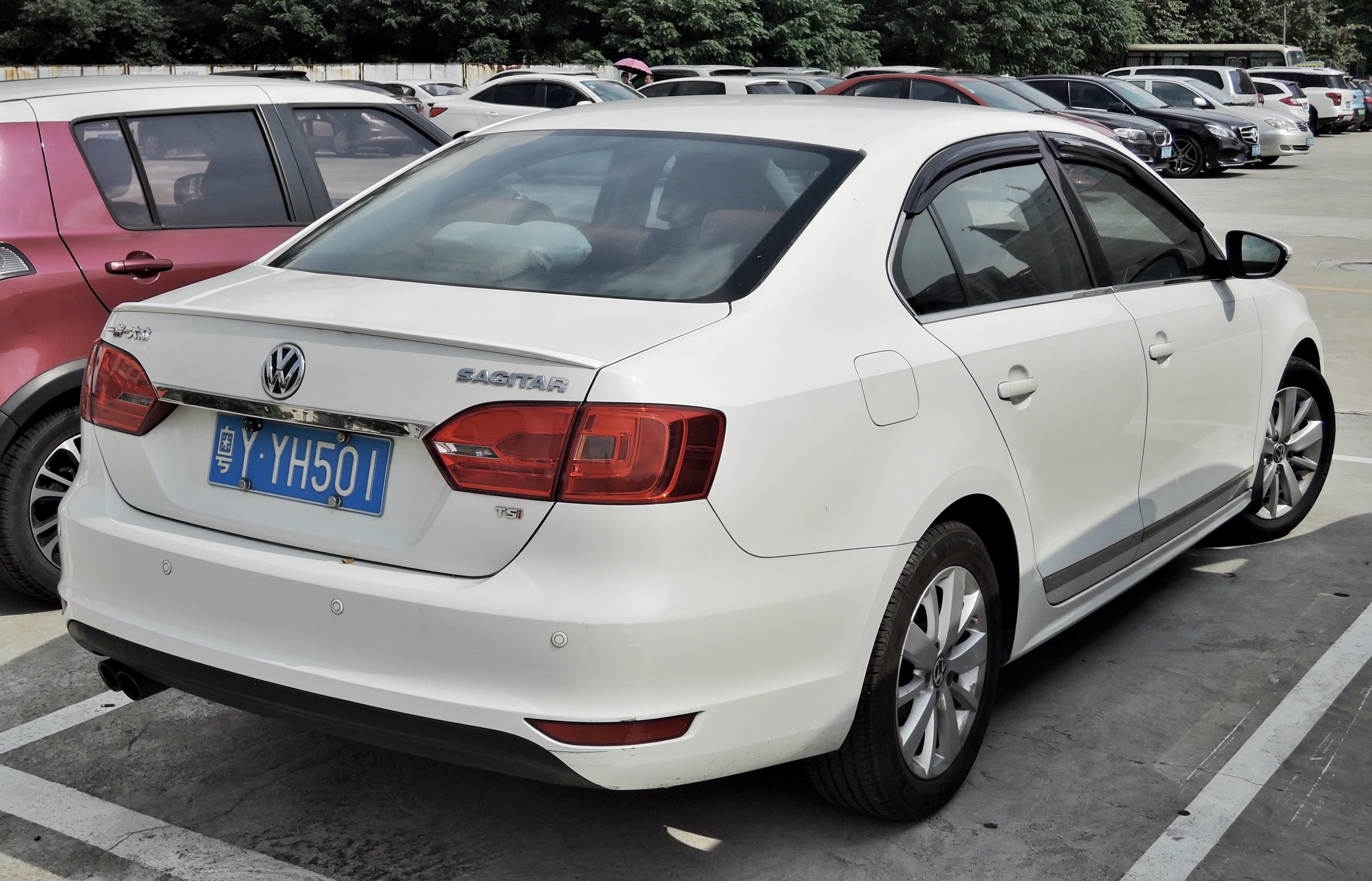
Rear
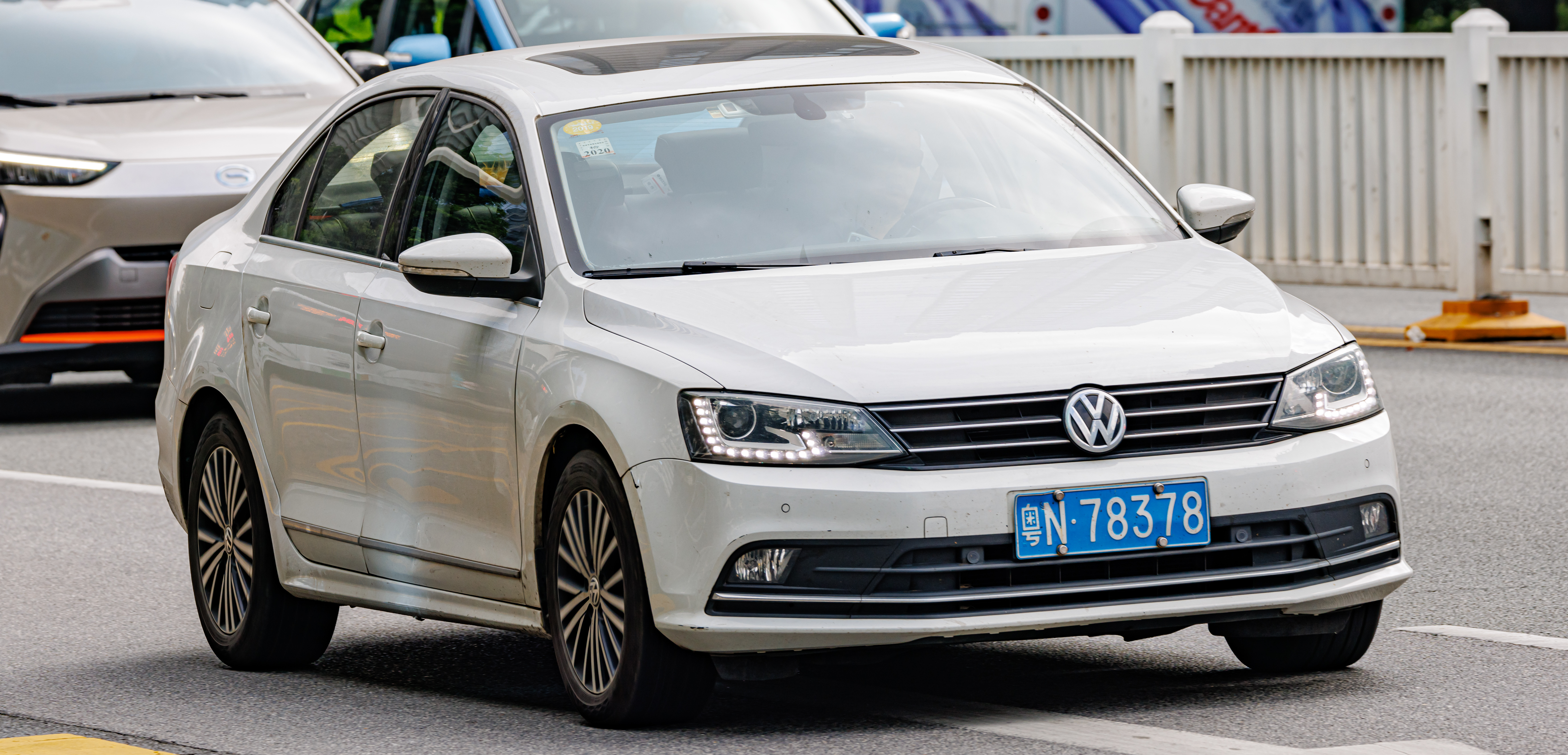
Volkswagen Sagitar II facelift

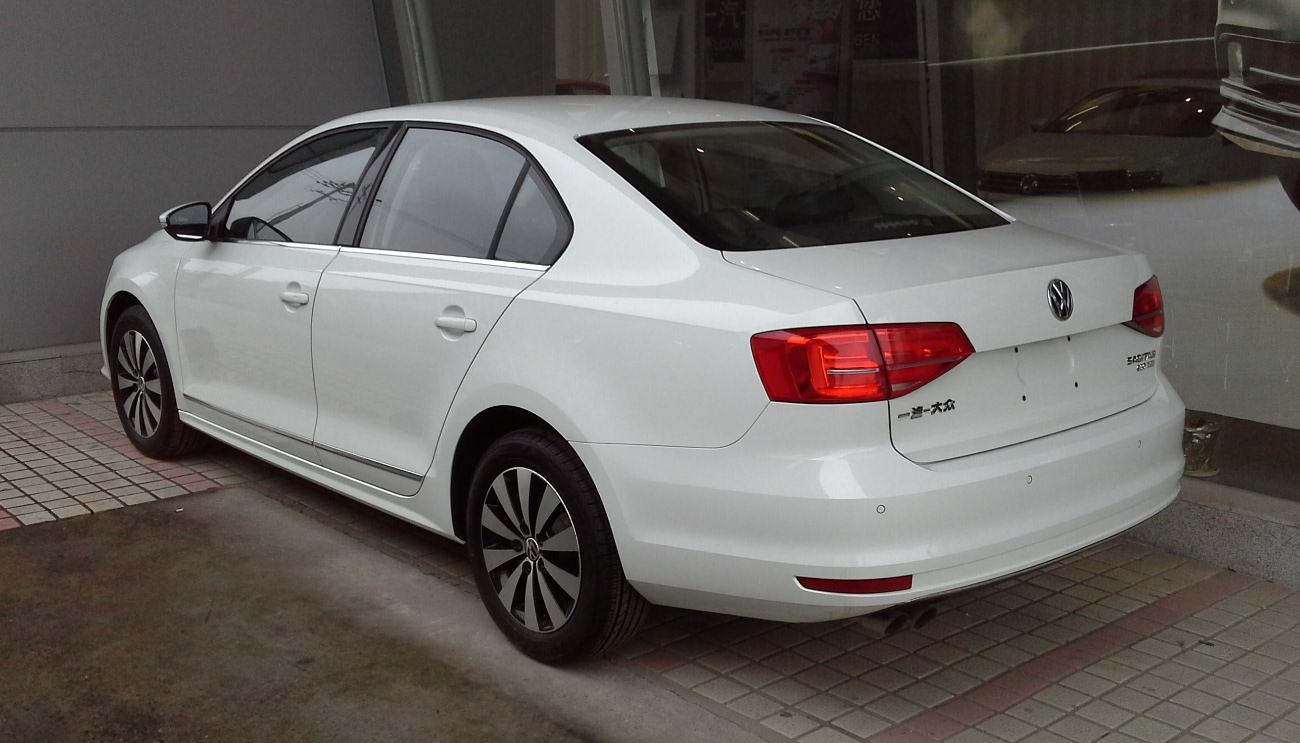
Rear

== Third generation (A7; 2019) ==
The Mk3 Sagitar was launched in January 2019. A 1.4 and 1.5 litre EA211 engine was standard paired to a 5 speed manual and 6-speed automatic gearbox.

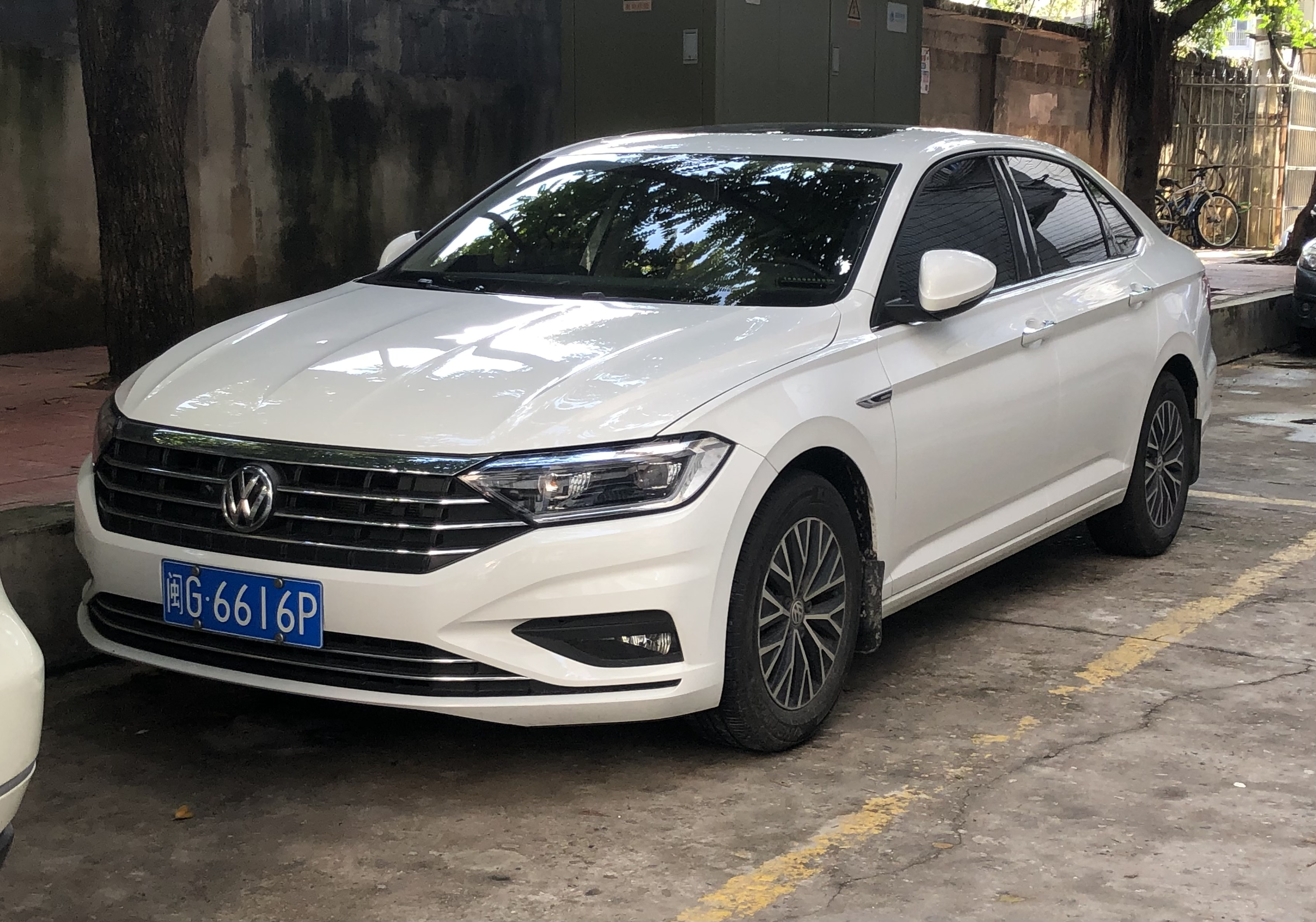
Volkswagen Sagitar III

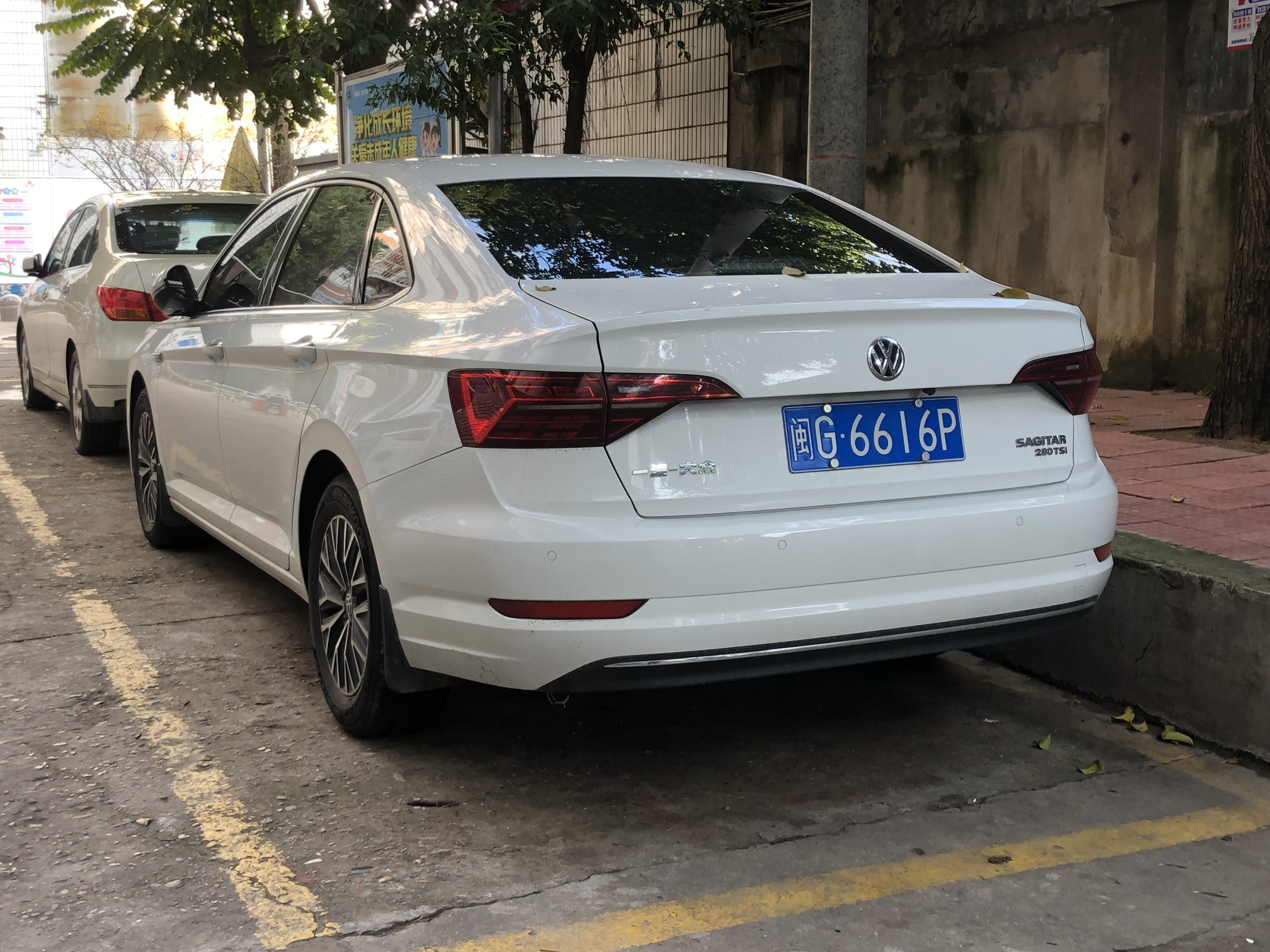
Rear
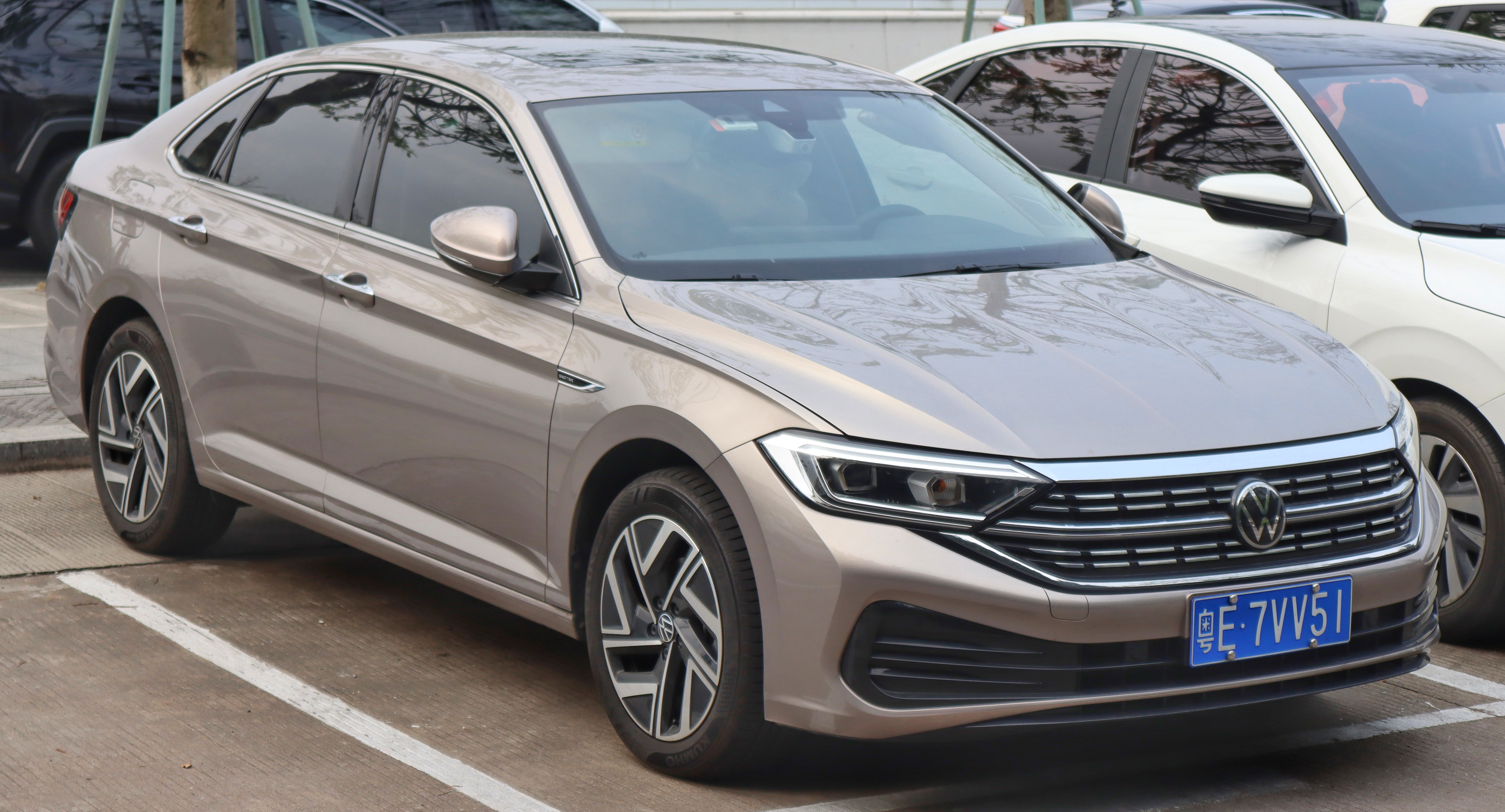
Volkswagen Sagitar III facelift

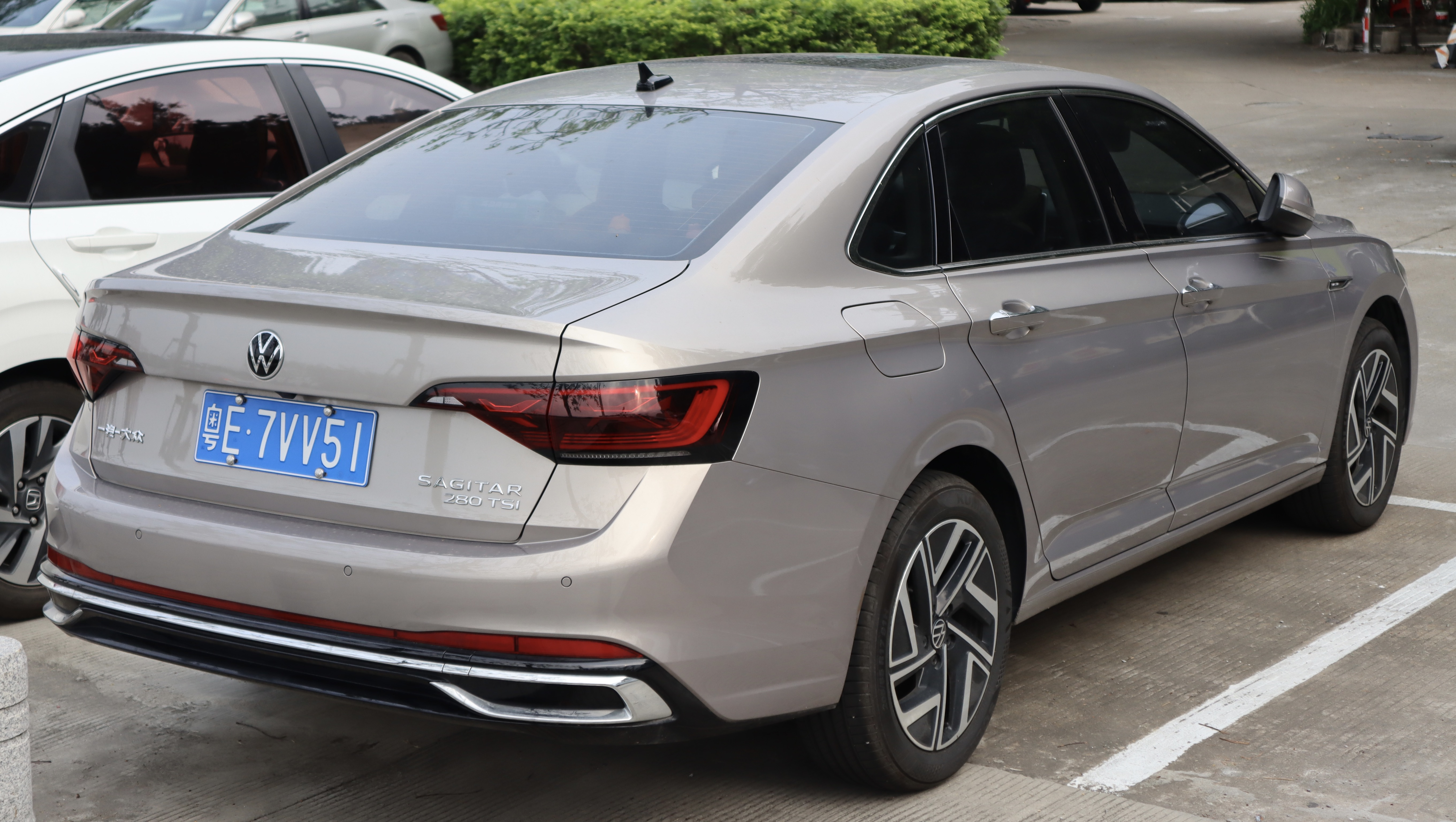
Rear

== Fourth generation (2025) ==
=== Sagitar L (2025) ===
Volkswagen Sagitar L
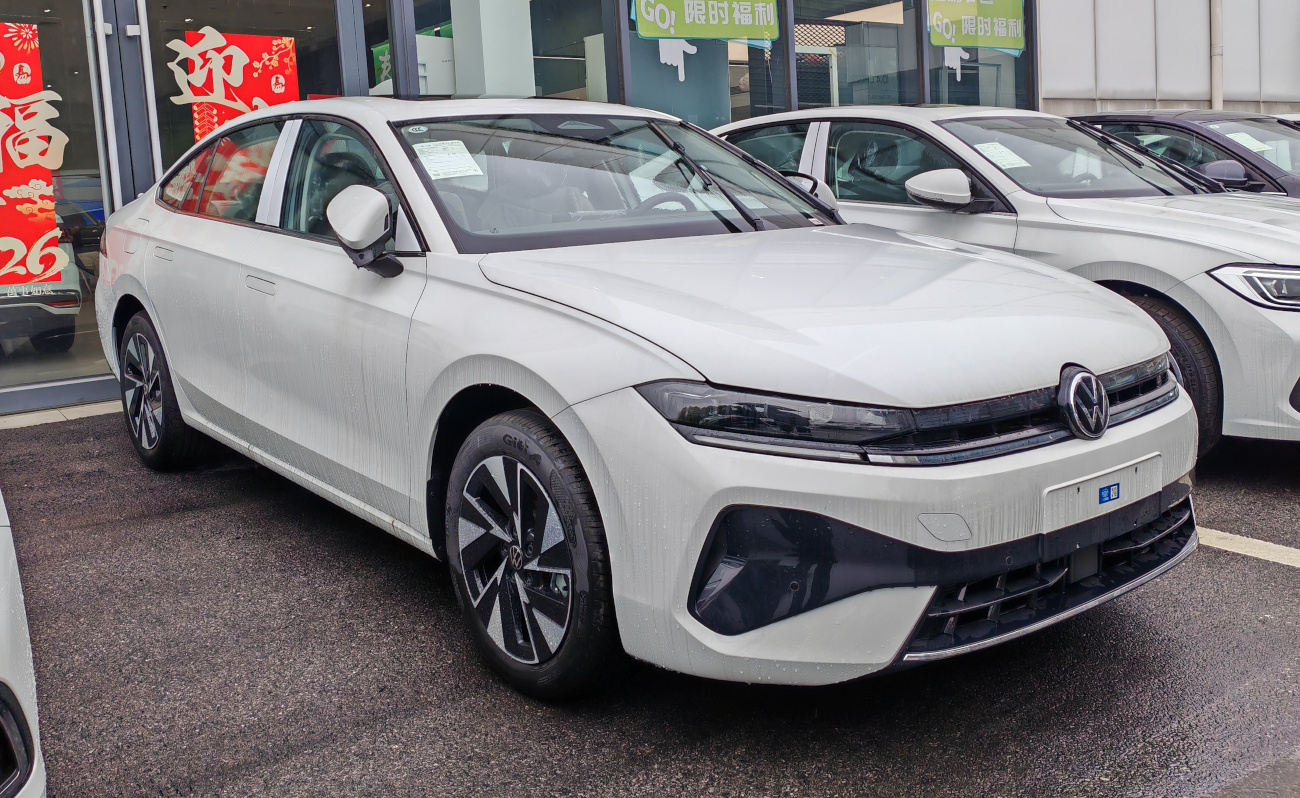

Overview
- Also called: Volkswagen Jetta (Middle East); Volkswagen Bora (Kazakhstan)
- Production: 2025–present
- Assembly: China: Chengdu (FAW-VW)

Body and chassis
- Platform: Volkswagen Group MQB Evo
- Related: Volkswagen Golf; Volkswagen Lamando; Volkswagen Taos/Tharu; Škoda Octavia

Powertrain
- Engine: Gasoline: 1.5 L TSI I4
- Transmission: 7-speed DQ380 DSG

Dimensions
- Wheelbase: 2,731 mm (107.5 in)
- Length: 4,812 mm (189.4 in)
- Width: 1,813 mm (71.4 in)
- Height: 1,479 mm (58.2 in)
- Curb weight: 1,310–1,347 kg (2,888–2,970 lb)

Chronology
- Predecessor: Volkswagen Jetta (A7)

The fourth generation Sagitar was unveiled at the 2025 Chengdu Auto Show as the 2026 model. Dubbed the Sagitar L, the fourth generation model was based on the same platform as the outgoing model, and shares the same wheelbase as the third generation long wheelbase variant. The powertrain is a 1.5-liter turbocharged 4-cylinder engine with 160 hp and 250 Nm, paired with a seven-speed DSG. The acceleration to 100 km/h takes 8.8 seconds, and top speed is 200 km/h. The interior features a 15-inch 2K central display and a 10.25-inch instrument panel with a head-up display. The system uses a Qualcomm 8155 chip and voice control is relies iFlytek and ByteDance.

Starting in November 2025, the car is marketed in the Middle East as the Volkswagen Jetta.

In August 2026, the car is also marketed in Kazakhstan as the Volkswagen Bora.

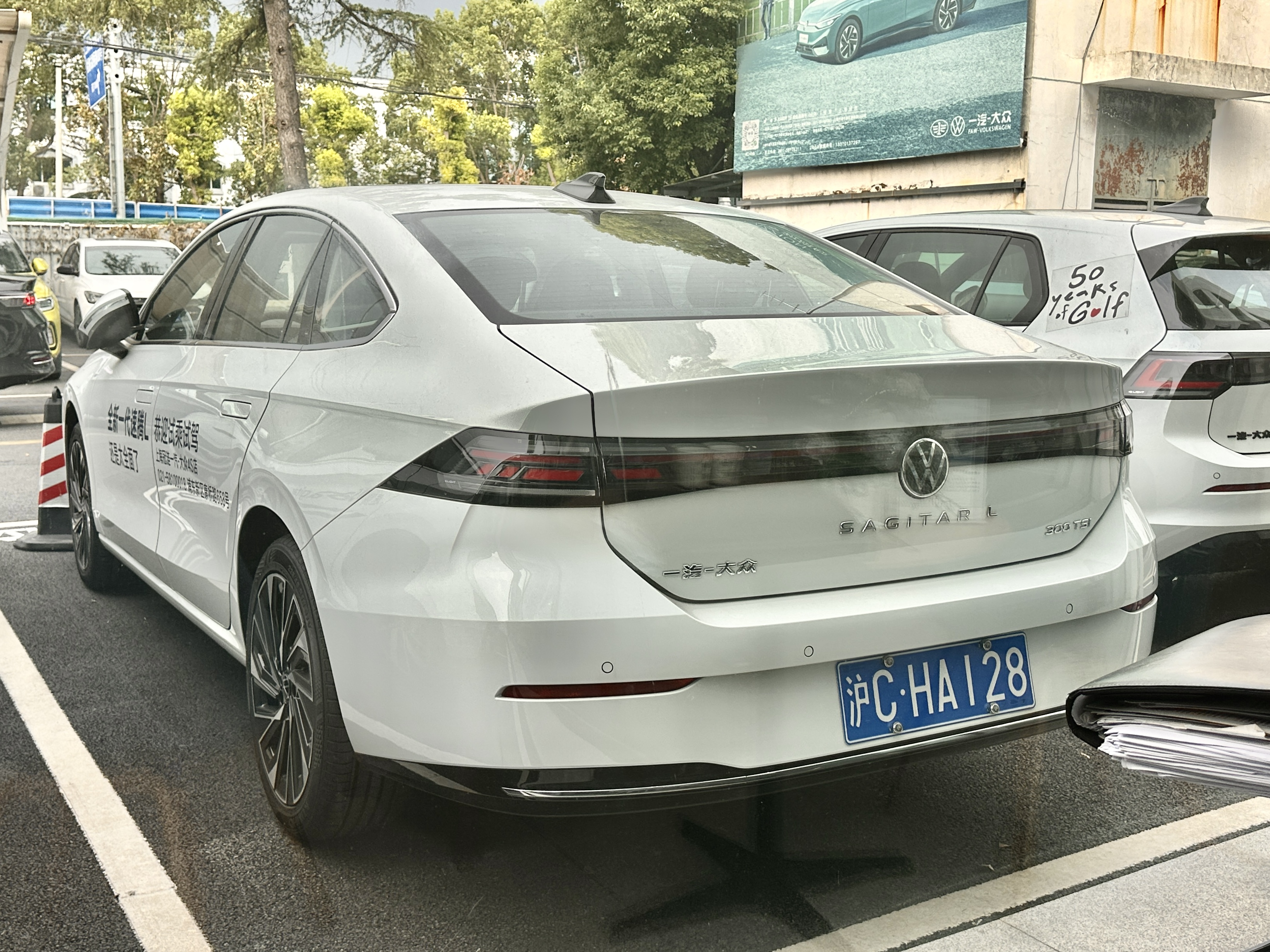
Rear view

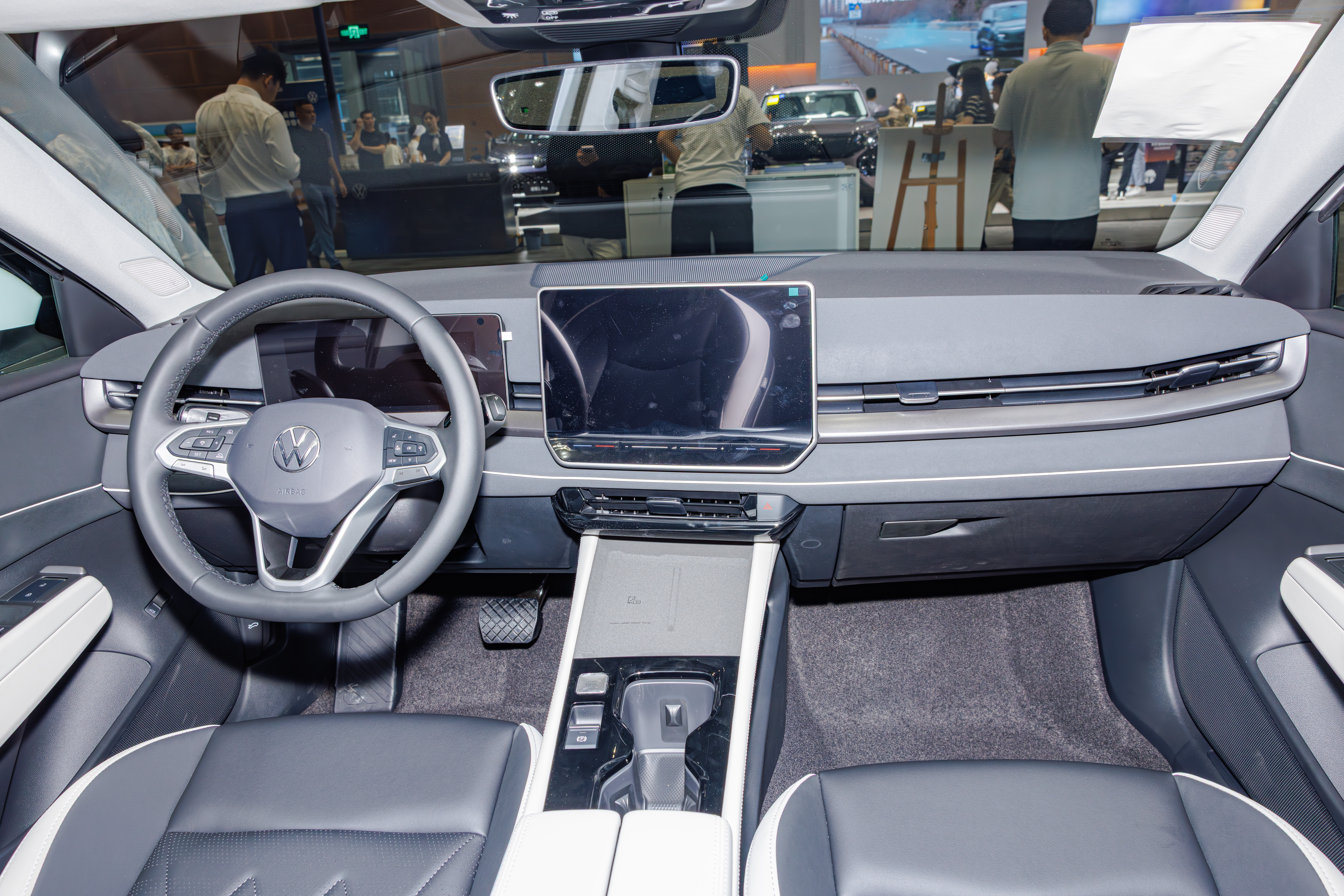
Interior

=== Sagitar S (2026) ===
Volkswagen Sagitar S
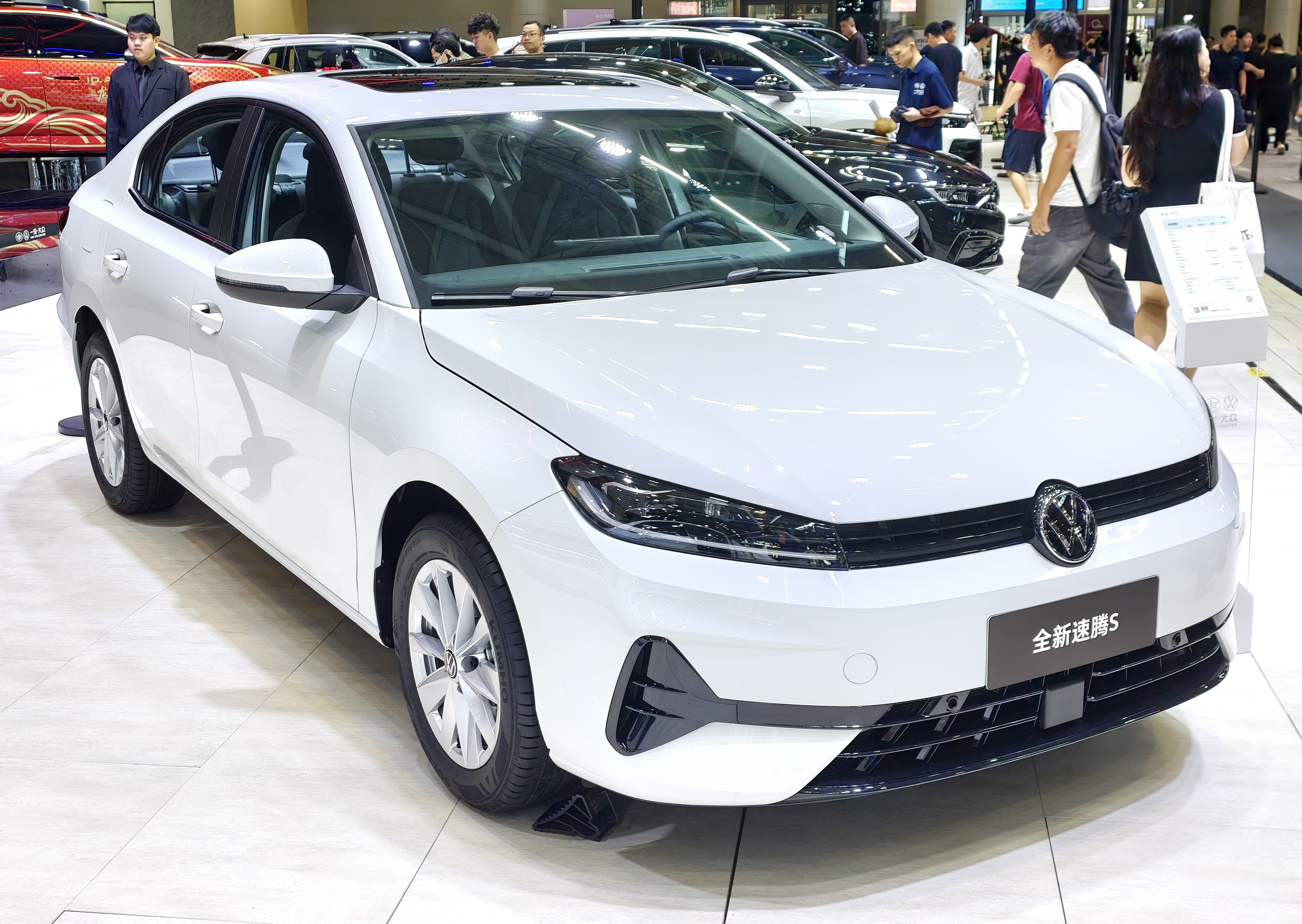

Overview
- Production: 2026–present
- Assembly: China: Qingdao (FAW-VW)

Body and chassis
- Platform: Volkswagen Group MQB platform
- Related: Volkswagen Bora

Powertrain
- Engine: Gasoline: 1.5 L I4

Dimensions
- Wheelbase: 2,688 mm (105.8 in)
- Length: 4,702 mm (185.1 in)
- Width: 1,815 mm (71.5 in)
- Height: 1,484 mm (58.4 in)
- Curb weight: 1,300–1,333 kg (2,866–2,939 lb)

The Sagitar S, the smaller and less expensive version of the Sagitar, was announced in January 2026. The Sagitar S replaced and shared the same platform with the Chinese market fourth generation Volkswagen Bora, which resulted in similar width and wheelbase length. At launch, two engine options are available with a 1.5 liter naturally aspirated MPI engine shared with the Volkswagen Lavida XR mated to a 6-speed automatic transmission producing a 81 kW maximum power output and a top speed of 190 km/h, and a 1.5 liter turbo EVO2 engine mated to a 7-speed DSG producing a 118 kW maximum power output.

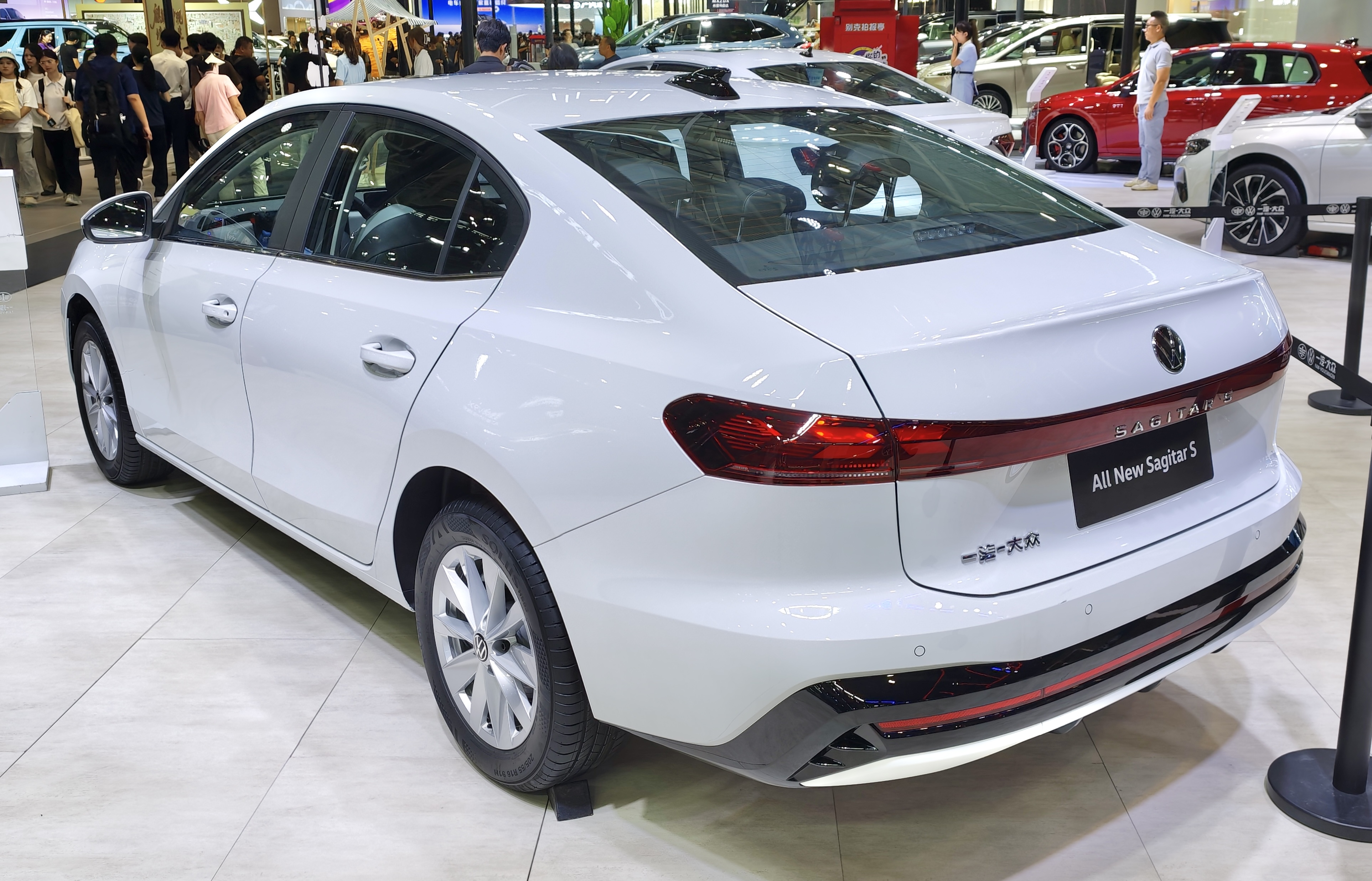
Rear view

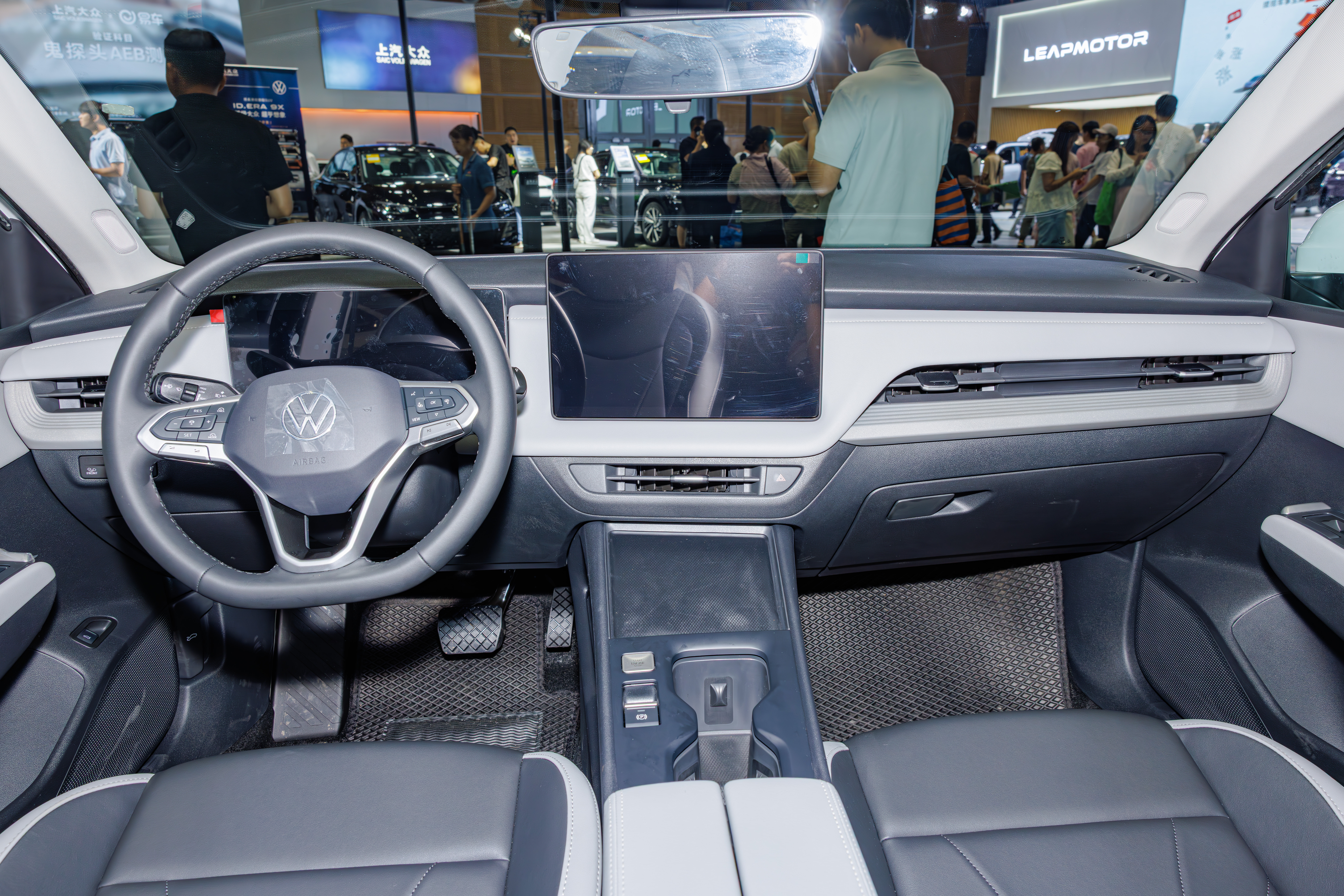
Interior

== Sales ==
Year	China
2023	284,488
2024	248,537
2025	240,956
