= Chinese Idol =

Chinese television series

- Also known as: Zhōngguó Mèng Zhī Shēng
- Chinese: 中国梦之声
- Genre: Reality game show
- Created by: Simon Fuller
- Presented by: Lin Hai and Cheng Lei
- Judges: Han Hong (2013–2014); Huang Xiaoming (2013); Coco Lee (2013); Wang Wei-chung (2013); Adam Lambert (Guest, 2013); Vivian Hsu (2014); Richie Jen (2014); Guo Jingming (2014)
- Theme music composer: Julian Gingell; Barry Stone; Cathy Dennis
- Opening theme: A Moment Like This by Shila Amzah
- Country of origin: China
- Original languages: Mandarin; English
- No. of seasons: 2
- No. of episodes: 28

Production
- Production companies: FremantleMedia; 19 Entertainment

Original release
- Network: DragonTV (China) (Season 1 and Season 2); Astro AEC (Malaysia) (Season 2)
- Release: May 19, 2013 – December 14, 2014

Chinese Idol (Chinese: 中国梦之声; pinyin: Zhōngguó Mèng Zhī Shēng) is a Chinese reality/singing competition program. Based on the British television series, Pop Idol, which was created by Simon Fuller and developed by FremantleMedia, Chinese Idol premiered on May 19, 2013 on DragonTV and was hosted by Chinese TV hosts, Lin Hai, who previously hosted the Chinese version of Family Feud from April 2010 to October 2010, succeeded by Chinese actor, Ying Da, and Cheng Lei, who hosted China's Got Talent and the Chinese version of Top Gear from November 2014 to December 2015. Chinese Idol ended its second and final season on December 14, 2014.

The series, like its British and American counterparts, aims to find the best new singer in China based on viewer voting and participation. Chinese Idol employs a panel of judges to select the finalists and will then critique their performances, these include international recording artists Coco Lee and Vivian Hsu, Chinese recording artist Han Hong, Chinese actor Huang Xiaoming, Taiwanese actor and singer Richie Jen, and Taiwanese producer Wang Wei-chung.

Shila Amzah was given the honor to record the Chinese Idol's theme song called "A Moment Like This" (Chinese Ver.) and perform at the finale of Chinese Idol.

== Background ==
Beginning in 2004, various reality competition programs inspired by Pop Idol and its American counterpart, American Idol, were aired in China. One of these programs include the female-only singing contest Super Girl, which was canceled in 2011 due to the pressure brought by the Chinese Communist Party (CCP). The CCP had criticized Super Girl for its "western"-style voting process, a feature prominently used in the Idols format. In 2012, the Shanghai Dragon Television, brought the rights from FremantleMedia to air a Chinese version after the Idols creator Simon Fuller visited the country. With this feat, China became the fourteenth Asian nation to air the Idols format. Chinese Idol will also be the fifth franchise to also be broadcast internationally, after Pop Idol, American Idol, Australian Idol, and Pinoy Idol. A panel consisting of four judges were hired to select the finalists and will provide opinion on their performances, which consists of international recording artist Coco Lee, Chinese recording artist Han Hong, Chinese actor Huang Xiaoming, and Taiwanese producer Wang Wei-chung.

== Stages ==
The show consist of several stages,
Season 1
Stage 1: Producer Audition
Stage 2: Judges Audition
Room Audition for season 1
Stage 3: The Ebb Tides (Idol College Part 1
Contestants are decided into three groups. Judges decide which group through to stage 4 directly, which group are eliminated, which group needed to sing again without instrument.
Stage 4: The Night of Groups (Idol College Part 2
Contestants are divided into several groups, each group will perform one song, judges will then decide which 40+2 contestants go through. Stage 5: The Night of Groups (Idol College Part 3
Contestants will pair up and sing the same song together, Judegs then decide who go through to the next round.
Stage 6: Top 12 Decider
Judges and the 500 media judges decide the top 12.
Stage 7: Counter Attack
First live show, six contestants are back to the competition, each competitor needs to challenge two contestants, if the contestant won twice, he will be one of the Top 12. Judges, home viewers and the 500 media judges decide the final top 12.
Stage 8: Topic Show
Pre-recorded, 500 media judges and the judges will choose the final 6.
Stage 9: Final
500 media judges and judges will first choose the Top 4, then Top 3 and Top 2, at last, the judges will choose the winner, each judge represents one vote, and the 500 media judges have another vote.

== Season 1 auditions ==
Auditions for the first season were held from December 2012 to April 2013 in 42 cities across China and continued in New York City, Los Angeles, Sydney and Vancouver, making it the fifth nation to hold auditions outside its mainland, following American Idol (which previously held auditions in Puerto Rico), Nouvelle Star (which previously held auditions in Quebec), Australian Idol (which previously had held auditions in London) and Hay Superstar (which previously had held auditions in New York and Los Angeles).

== Season 1 finalists ==
Contestant	Name in Chinese
Yunggiema	央吉玛
Hou Lei	侯磊
Xu Mingming	许明明
James Morris-Cotterill (James Yang Yong Cong)	杨永聪
Ivy	艾菲
Li Xiangxiang	李祥祥
Alai	阿来
Liu Sihan	刘思涵
Luo Xijie	罗熙杰
He Dawei	何大为
Tuo Yunfu	妥云福
Deng Xiaokun	邓小坤

== Season 2 finalists ==
Contestant	Name in Chinese
Sinkey Zheng	鄭興琦
Zhu Xing Dong	朱興東
Emily	李安梅
Irfan	伊爾盼
Heyson Ma	馬海生
Zheng Qiu Hong	鄭秋泓
Tang Bao	唐寶
Iris	賴儀雯
Yao Wei Tao	姚偉濤
Li Jin	栗錦
Sagi	薩吉
Janice Yan	閻奕格

== Season 1 ratings ==
Episode	Date	Time	Rating	Percent	National ranking
1	19 May 2013	10:00-11:30 PM	1.115	4.92%	2
2	25 May 2013	10:00-11:30 PM	0.704	3.32%	8
3	2 June 2013	10:00-11:30 PM	1.341	6.79%	2
4	9 June 2013	10:00-11:30 PM	1.284	5.30%	2
5	15 June 2013	10:00-11:30 PM	1.203	3.67%	4
6	16 June 2013	10:00-11:30 PM	1.471	4.99%	2
7	22 June 2013	10:00-11:30 PM	1.300	4.25%	3
8	23 June 2013	10:00-11:30 PM	1.431	4.92%	2
9	30 June 2013	9:15-11:30 PM	4.120	18.44%	1
10	7 July 2013	9:15-11:30 PM	4.157	15.55%	1
11	14 July 2013	9:15-11:30 PM	4.242	17.14%	1
12	21 July 2013	9:30-11:30 PM	3.648	15.54%	1
13	28 July 2013	9:30-11:30 PM	3.447	12.68%	1
14	4 August 2013	9:30-11:30 PM	3.702	13.40%	1
15	11 August 2013	9:15-11:30 PM	4.252	15.63%	1
16	25 August 2013	8:30-12:00 PM	3.458	11.59%	1

The data determined by CSM.
