= Cheng Lei =

Chinese television presenter

Cheng Lei (程雷)
- Born: August 26, 1971 (age 53); Shanghai, China
- Occupation: Television presenter
- Years active: 1994–present
- Employer: SMG

Cheng Lei (Chinese: 程雷; pinyin: Chéng Léi; born on August 26, 1971) is a Chinese television presenter.

Cheng Lei was a student in Shanghai Theater Academy in the 1990s. After graduation, he was chosen as a host for Broken Brain (智力大沖浪) by Shanghainese producer Xiao Chen. He also worked on several interviews.

Cheng's family has a long history of liver disease. In 2000, he was diagnosed with Hepatitis B. On January 18, 2004, he took a temporary leave from television though he said in a statement that he would take advanced courses abroad. On February 22, 2005, he returned to television. In June 2007, he was sick once again but he re-appeared on a television show called Dating on Saturdays (相約星期六). He has hosted the British-imports China's Got Talent, Chinese Idol, and Top Gear.

== TV host ==
- 1994–2004 Broken Brain (智力大沖浪)
- 2006–2010 Dating on Saturdays (相約星期六)
- 2010 We Are Family (華人大綜藝)
- 2010 The All or Nothing Show (達芬奇密碼)
- 2010–2013 China's Got Talent (season 1-4)
- 2012 The Cube (梦立方)
- 2012–present Super Diva (妈妈咪呀)
- 2013–2014 Chinese Idol (中国梦之声)
- 2013 So You Think You Can Dance (舞林争霸)
- 2014–2015 Top Gear China (巅峰拍档)
