= Volkswagen Lamando =

Midsize sedan

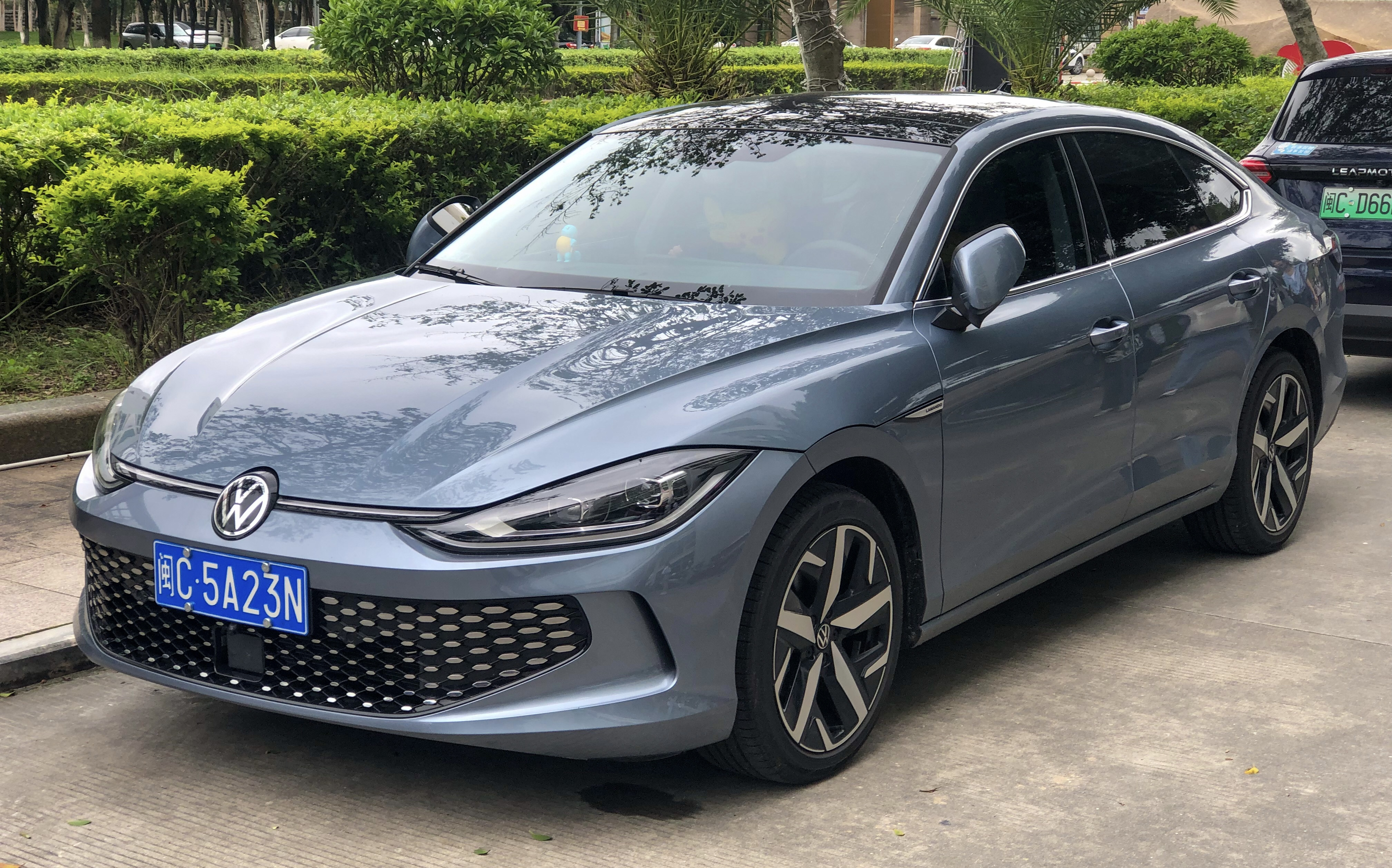
- Volkswagen Lamando L

Overview
- Manufacturer: Volkswagen
- Production: 2014–present
- Assembly: China: Ningbo, Zhejiang (SAIC-VW)

Body and chassis
- Class: Small family car/compact car (C)
- Body style: 4-door sedan
- Layout: Front-engine, front-wheel-drive; Front-engine, all-wheel-drive

The Volkswagen Lamando (Chinese: 大众凌渡; pinyin: Dàzhòng Língdù) is a compact sedan manufactured by Volkswagen through its joint venture SAIC Volkswagen in China. It debuted at the Chengdu Auto Show in August 2014 and was launched in China in November 2014. The Lamando is positioned as the low-slung version of the Lavida Pro (Jetta outside China) in the country, as it is the case with the Volkswagen CC to the Passat.

== First generation (2014) ==
First generation
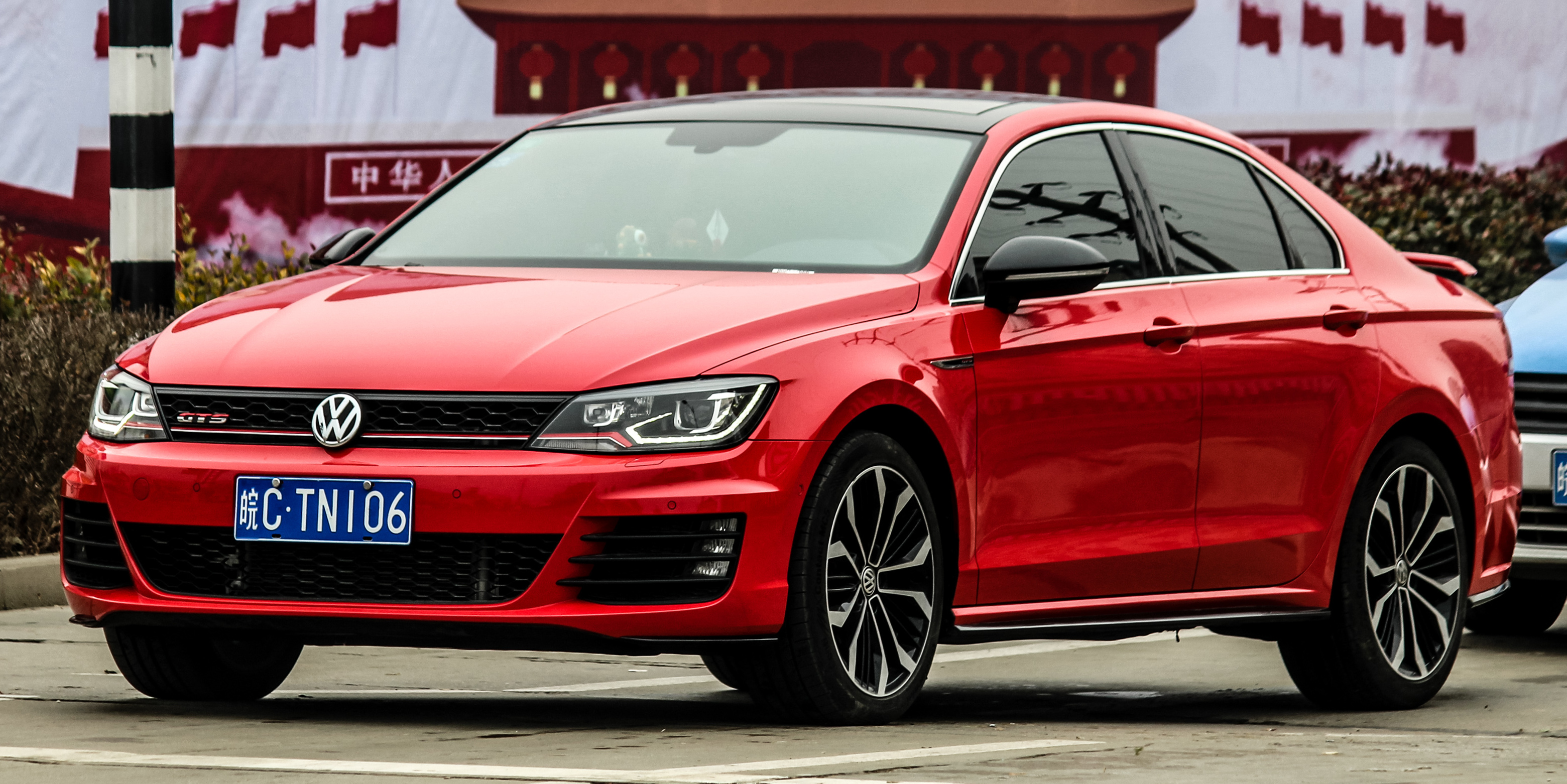
- Volkswagen Lamando GTS

Overview
- Production: 2014–2022
- Model years: 2015–2021
- Designer: Marco Pavone

Body and chassis
- Platform: Volkswagen Group MQB platform
- Related: Volkswagen Golf Mk7; Škoda Octavia Mk3

Powertrain
- Engine: Petrol: 1.4 L EA211 TSI I4; 1.8 L EA888 TSI I4; 2.0 L EA888 TSI I4 (GTS)
- Transmission: 5-speed manual; 7-speed DSG

Dimensions
- Wheelbase: 2,656 mm (104.6 in)
- Length: 4,598 mm (181.0 in)
- Width: 1,826 mm (71.9 in)
- Height: 1,425 mm (56.1 in)
- Kerb weight: 1,300–1,445 kg (2,866–3,186 lb)

The first-generation Lamando is powered by a 1.4-litre turbocharged petrol engine producing 110 kW (150 PS; 148 hp) and 250 N⋅m (184 lb⋅ft; 25 kg⋅m) of torque mated to a 7-speed DSG gearbox as the only transmission offered for the vehicle. The Lamando is capable of doing a 0–100 km/h (0–62 mph) acceleration in 8.5 seconds and has a top speed of 210 km/h (130 mph). Only front-wheel-drive is available. The 4-wheel disk brakes and electrically assisted steering is standard. Suspension is independent MacPherson struts at the front and an independent four-link suspension at the rear.

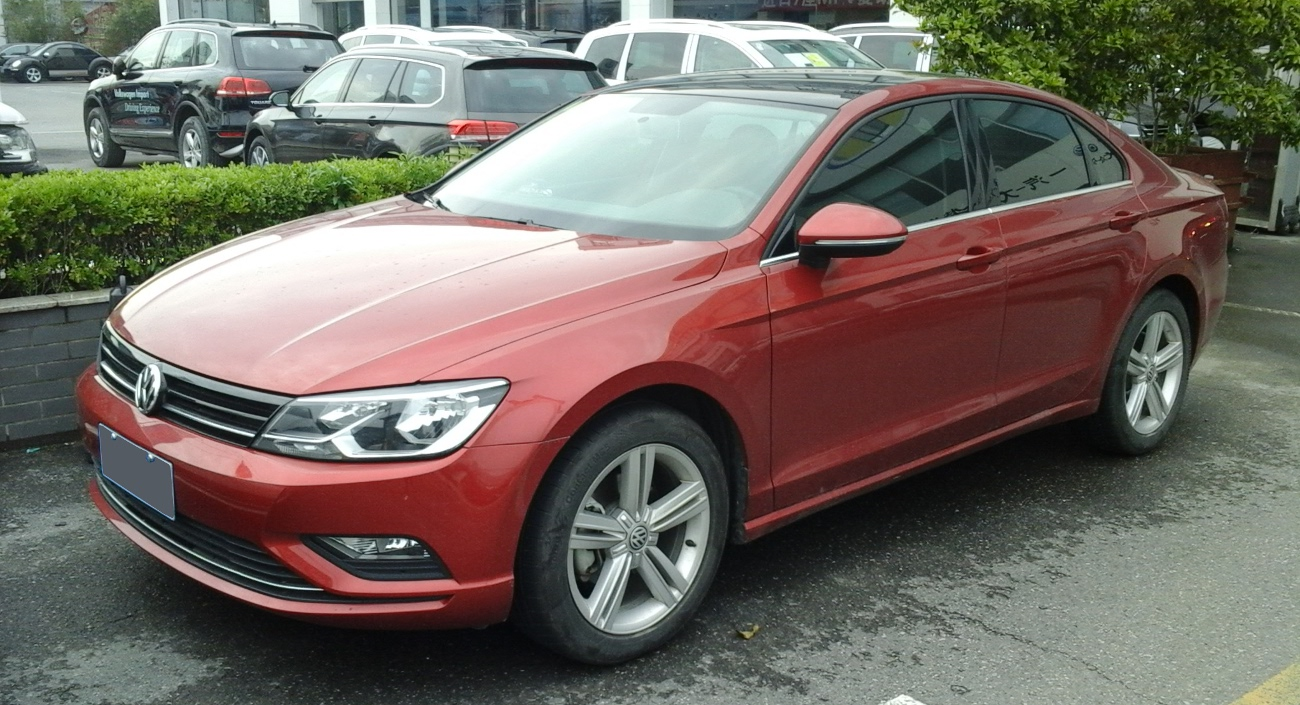
Front view of the Volkswagen Lamando

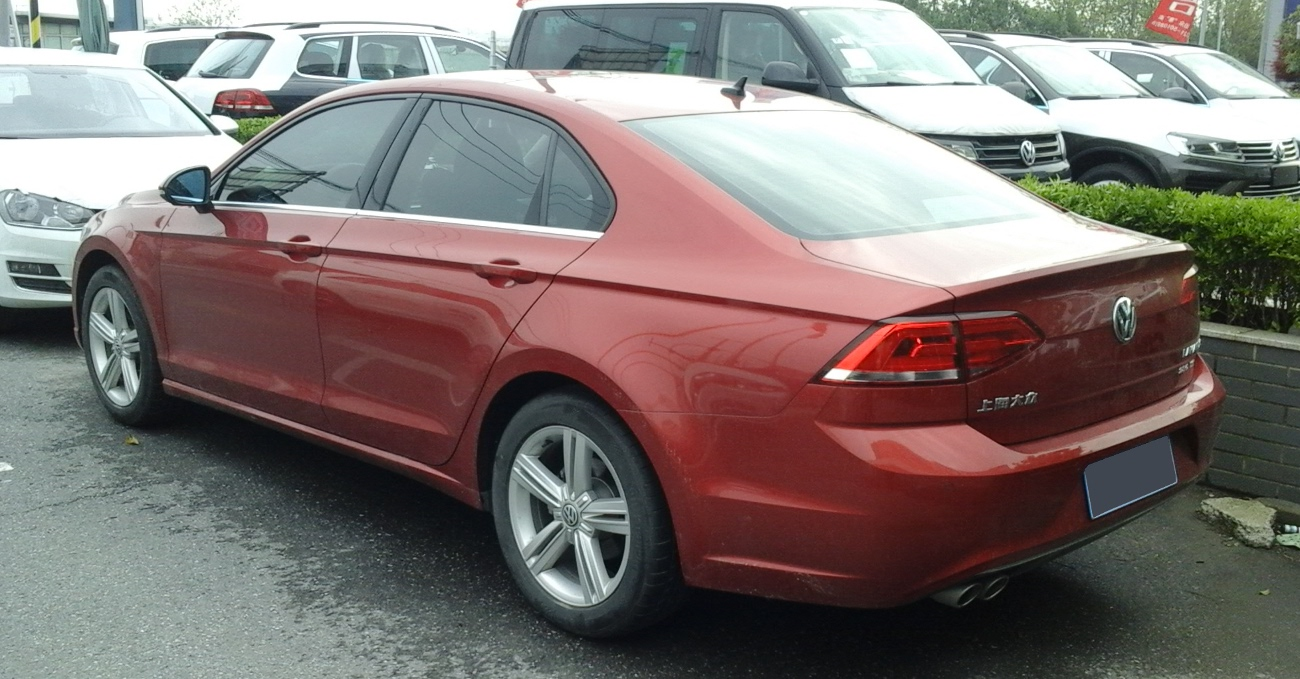
Rear view of the Volkswagen Lamando

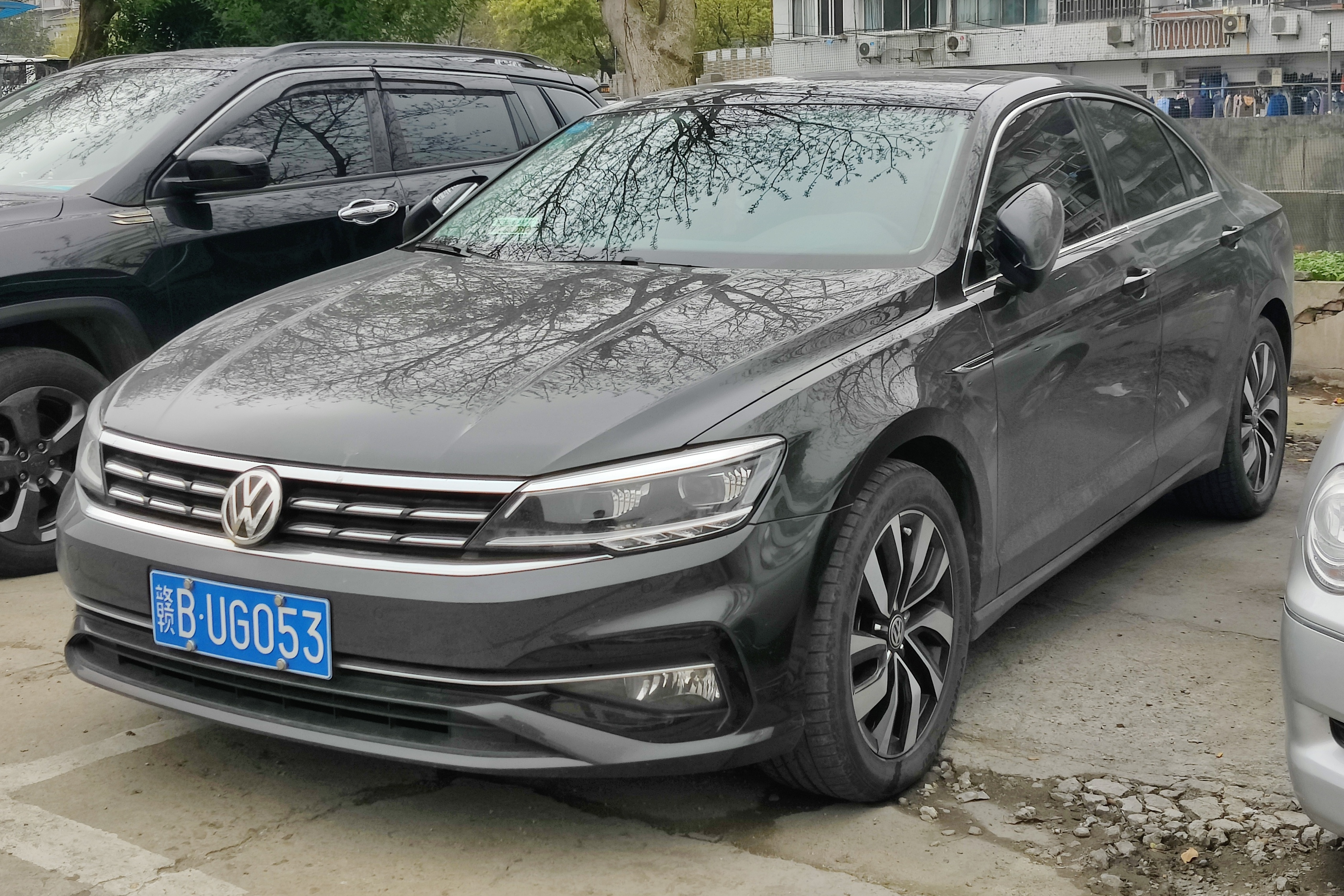
Volkswagen Lamando facelift

=== Export markets ===
The Lamando was exported to the Philippines from 2018 to 2022. Sales of the Lamando Discontinued in September 2025 following the Termination of Distributorship Agreement Between AC Industrials and Volkswagen Group.

=== Lamando GTS ===
In April 2016, a sportier GTS trim was launched with cosmetic upgrades and the 2-litre turbocharged engine from the Golf GTI producing 162 kW (220 PS; 217 hp) and 350 N⋅m (258 lb⋅ft; 36 kg⋅m) of torque, mated to a 7-speed wet-clutch DSG gearbox. Styling wise, several design features have been enhanced on the GTS, including the front bumper with extra-large air intakes and the upper grille featuring a red GTI-like stripe and honeycomb grilles. The Lamando was used on the Chinese version of Top Gear as part of the Star in a Reasonably Priced Car segment in the second season, replacing the Ford Focus.

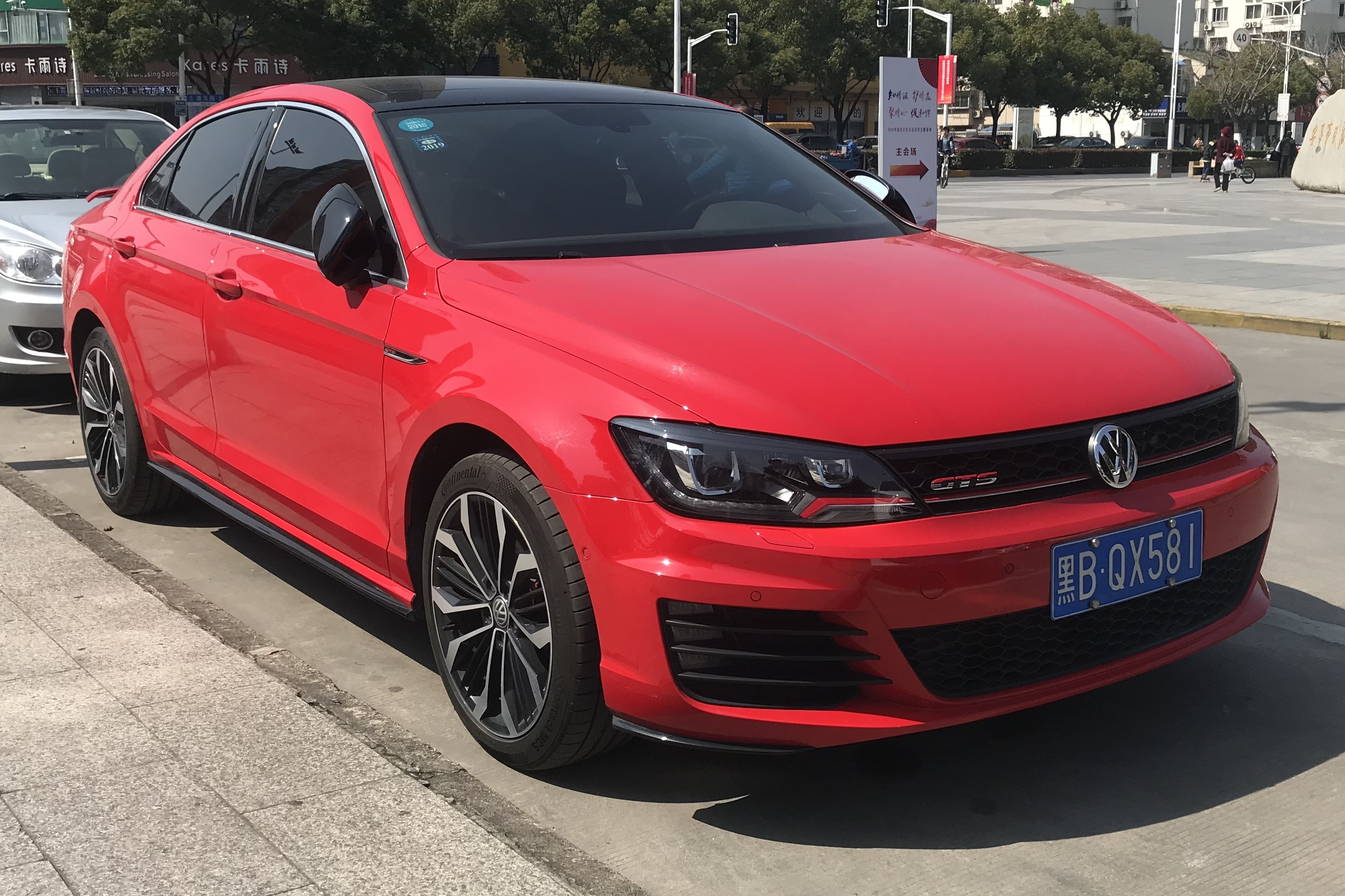
Lamando GTS

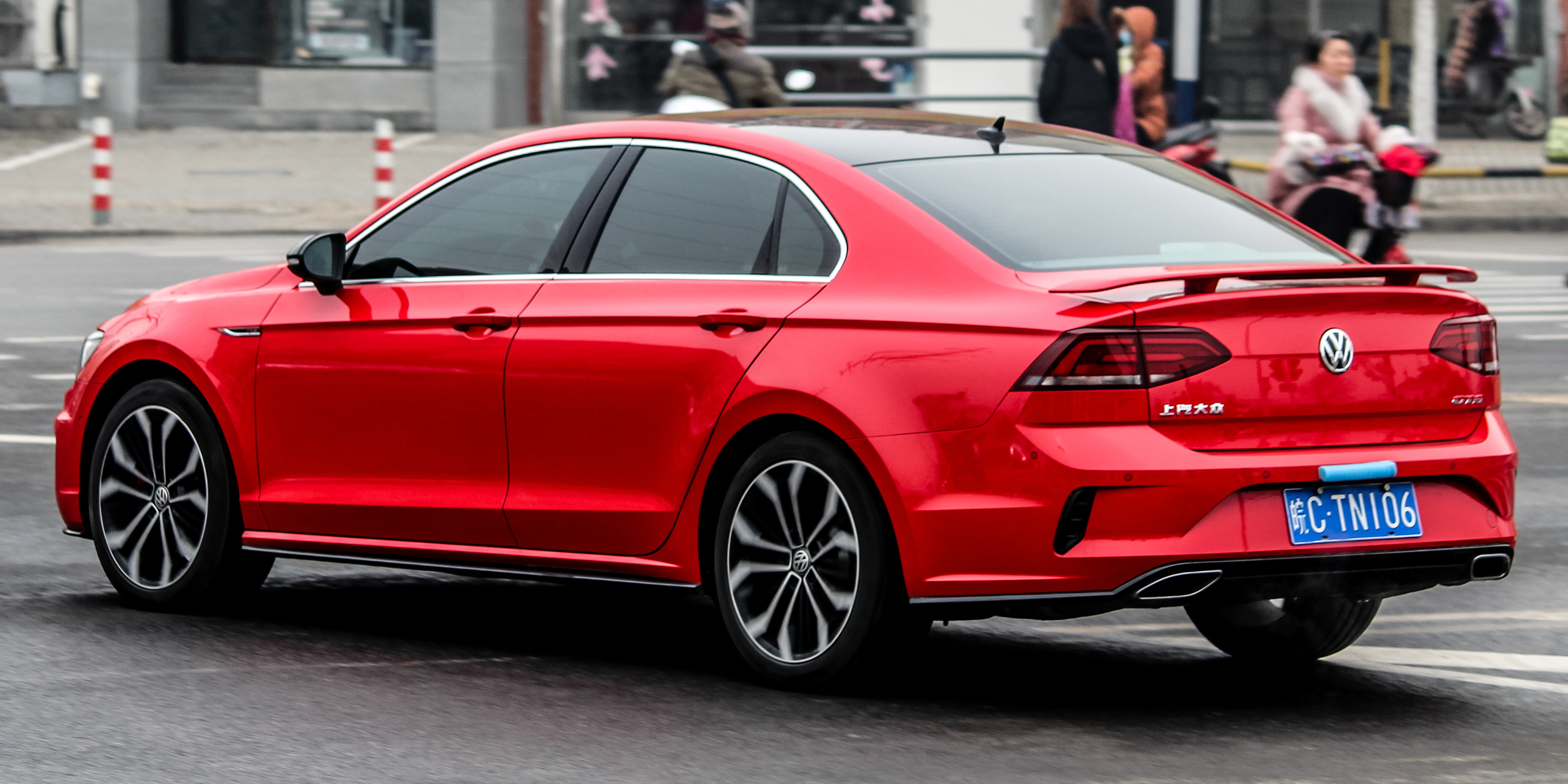
Lamando GTS

== Second generation (2022) ==
Second generation
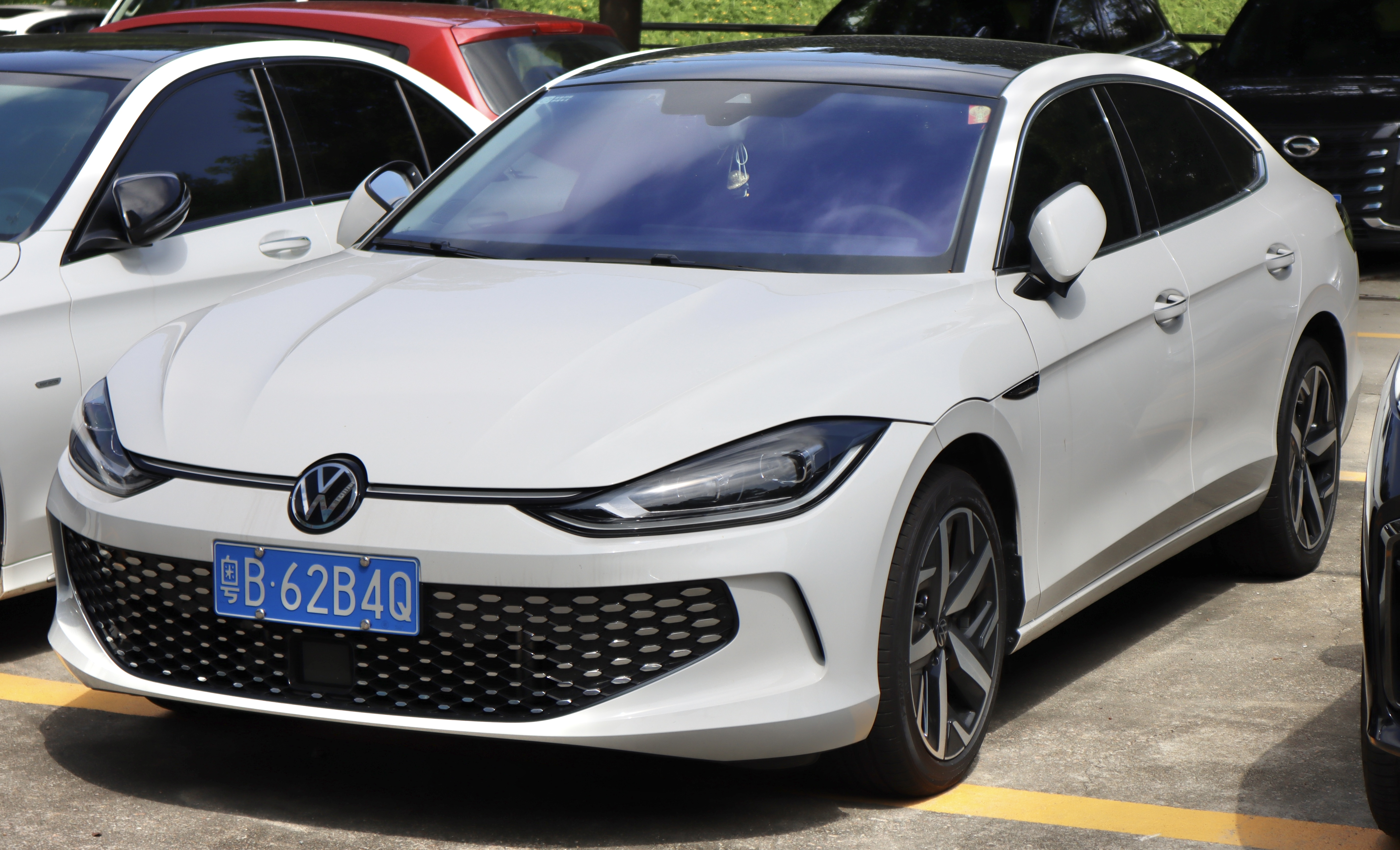

Overview
- Production: 2022–present
- Designer: Marco Pavone

Body and chassis
- Platform: Volkswagen Group MQB Evo

Powertrain
- Engine: Petrol: 1.4 L EA211 TSI I4

Dimensions
- Wheelbase: 2,731 mm (107.5 in)
- Length: 4,784 mm (188.3 in); 4,791 mm (188.6 in) (facelift)
- Width: 1,831 mm (72.1 in)
- Height: 1,469 mm (57.8 in)

The second-generation Lamando was released in January 2022. Marketed as the Lamando L, the second generation model features the updated Volkswagen design language with design cues taken from recent Volkswagen models. The second generation model continues to be powered by the 1.4-litre turbocharged petrol engine producing 150 horsepower (112 kW; 152 PS).

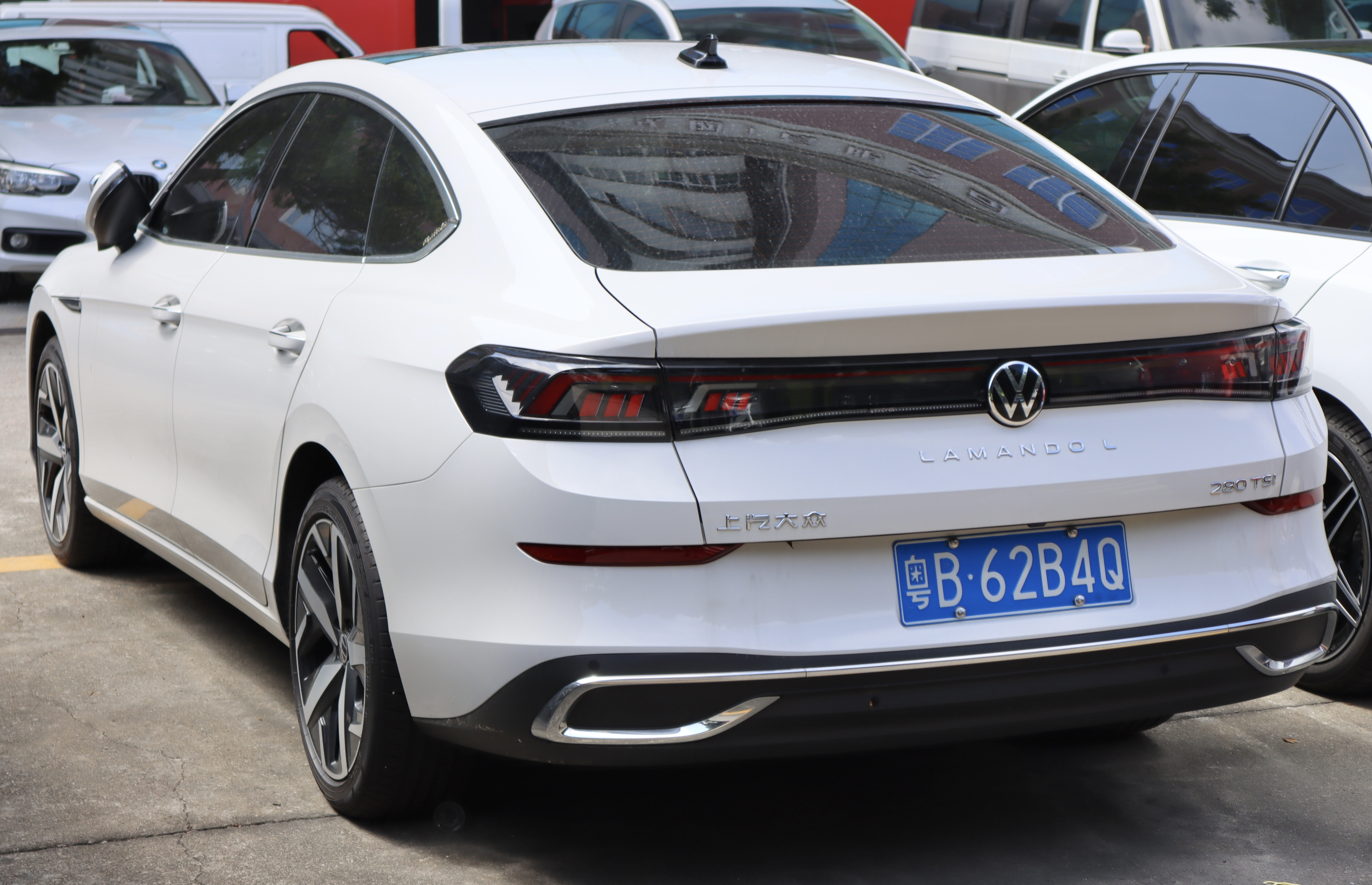
Rear view

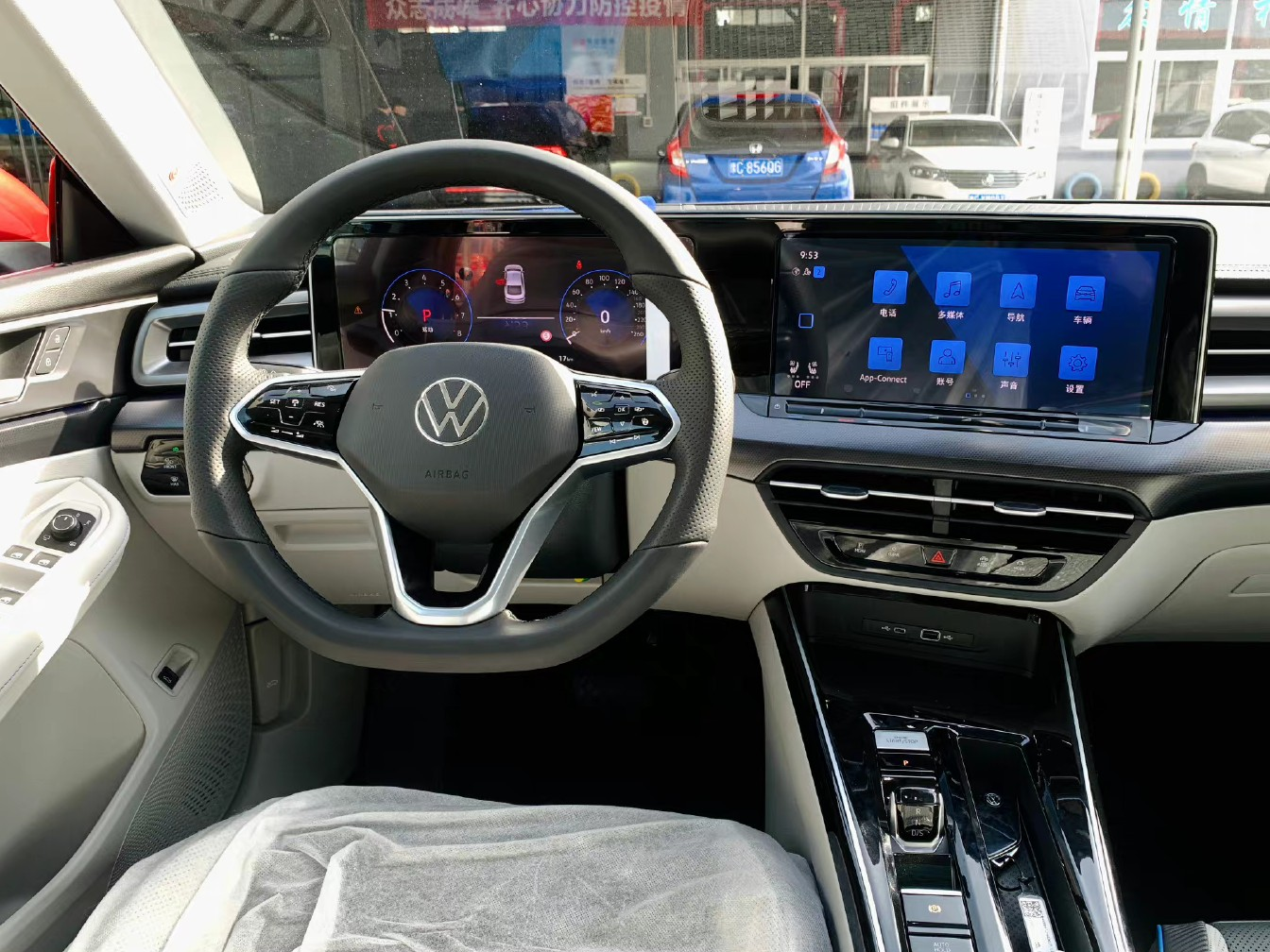
Interior

=== 2026 model year and GTS variant ===
The Lamando L received a facelift in 2025 for the 2026 model year. The facelift introduced refreshed front and rear end designs, and marks the return of the GTS performance variant. The 2026 model was introduced during the Chengdu Auto Show in August 2025. The Lamando L GTS is powered by the EA888 Gen3.5 2.0 liter turbo engine shared with the Golf GTI featuring 350bar high pressure injection producing a maximum output of 162 kW and 350N·m. The engine is mated to a DQ381 7-speed wet style dual clutch transmission, enabling a 0–100 km/h acceleration within 6.98 seconds.

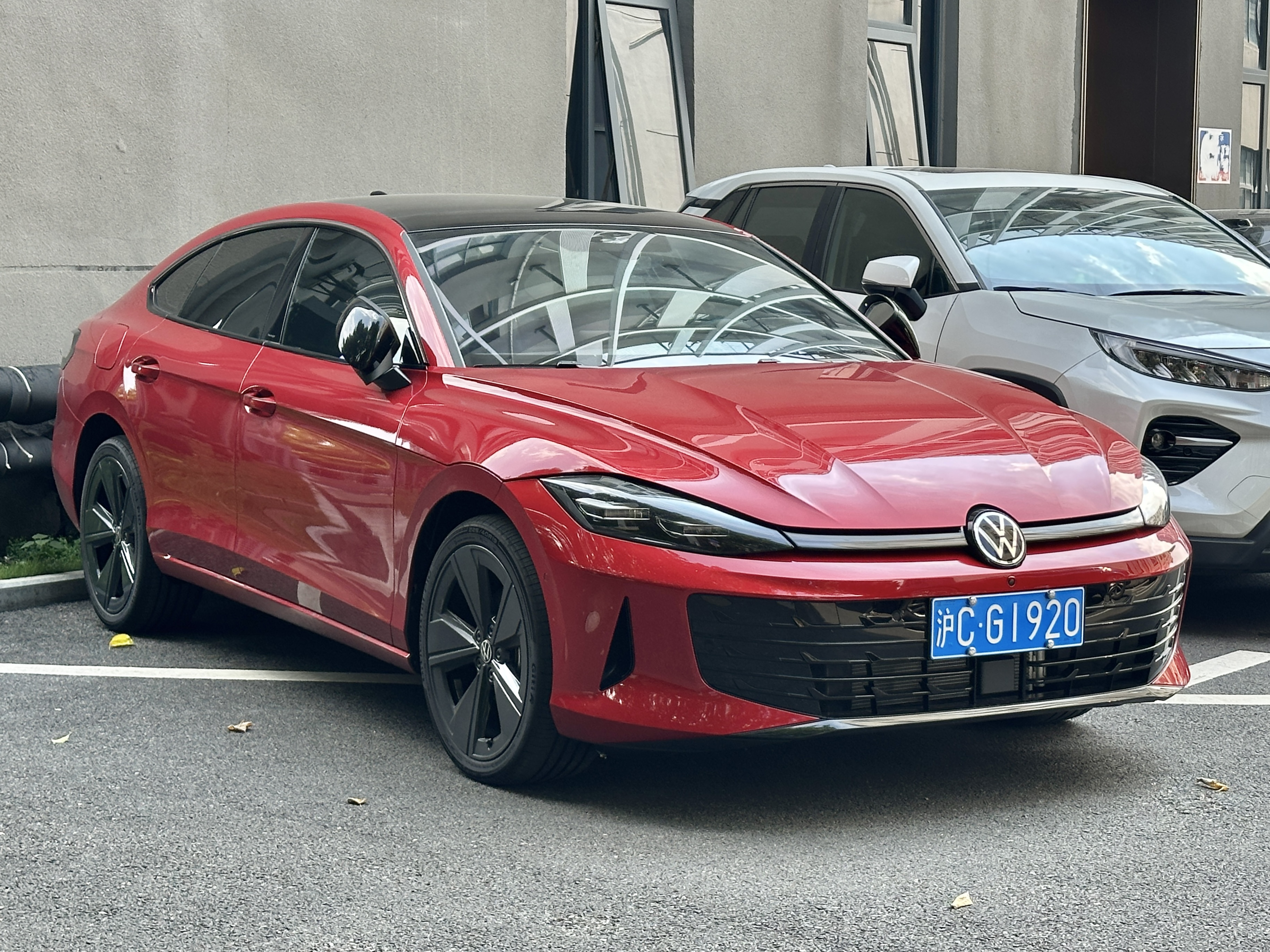
Volkswagen Lamando L GTS

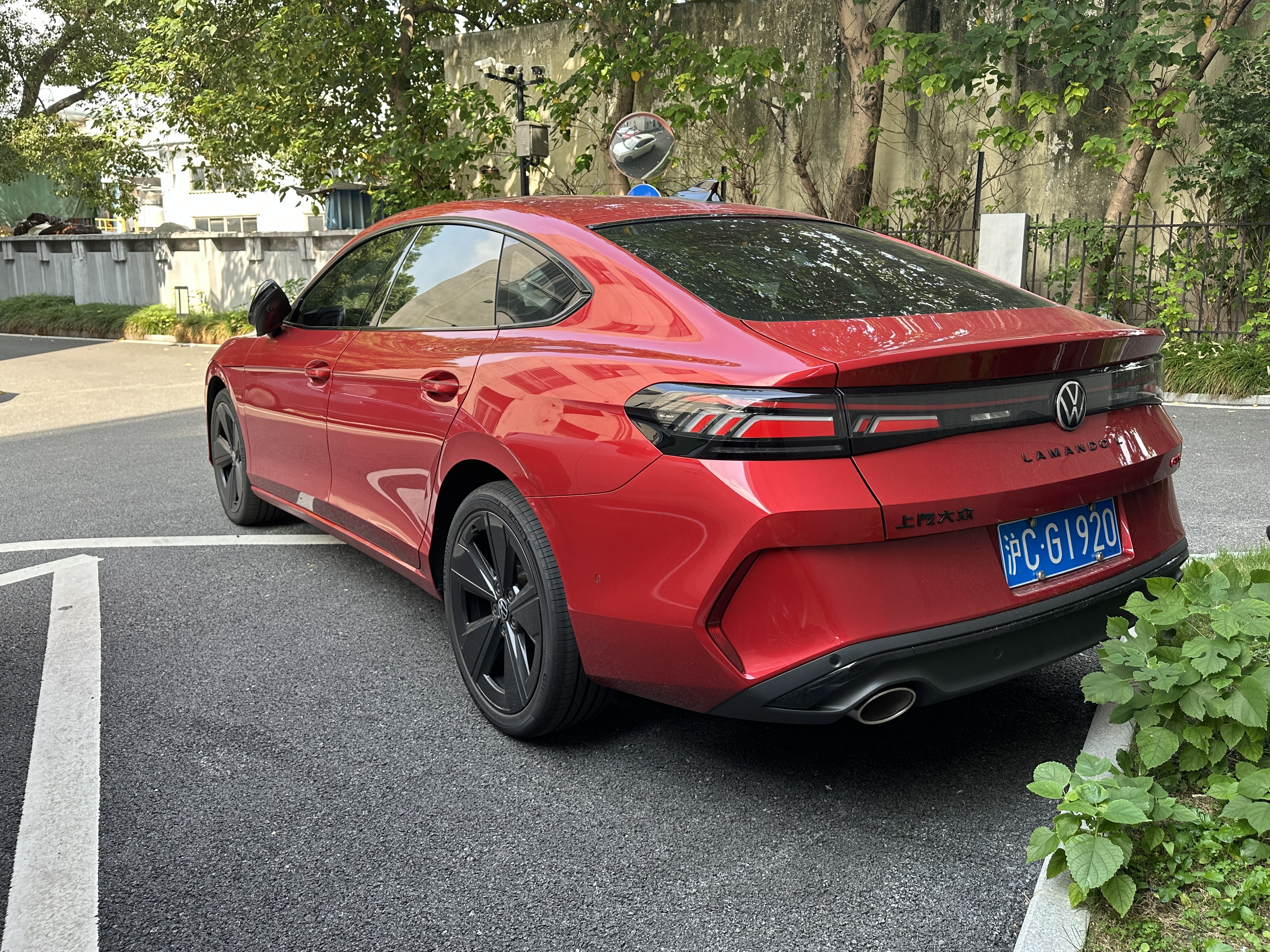
Rear

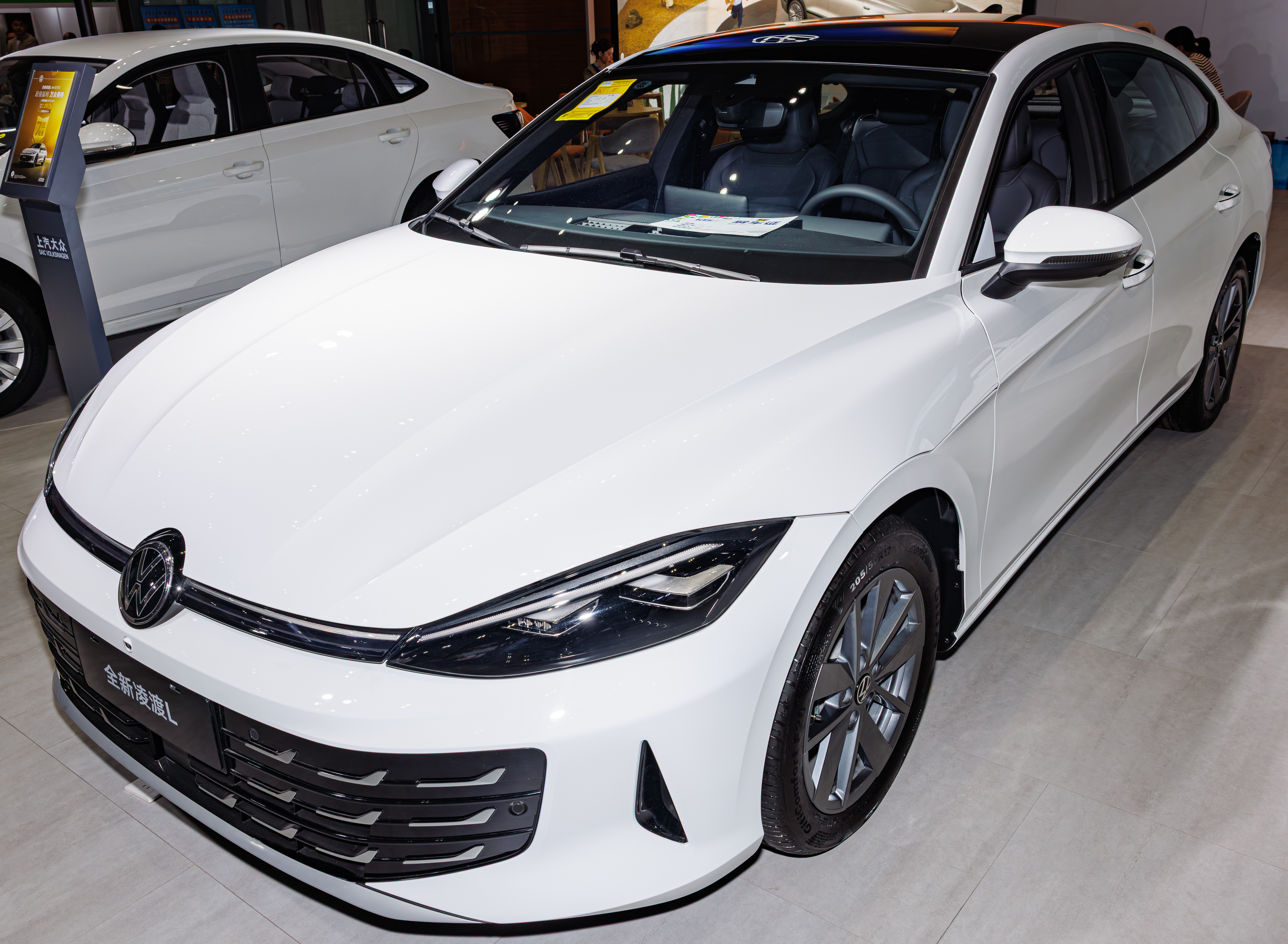
Facelift

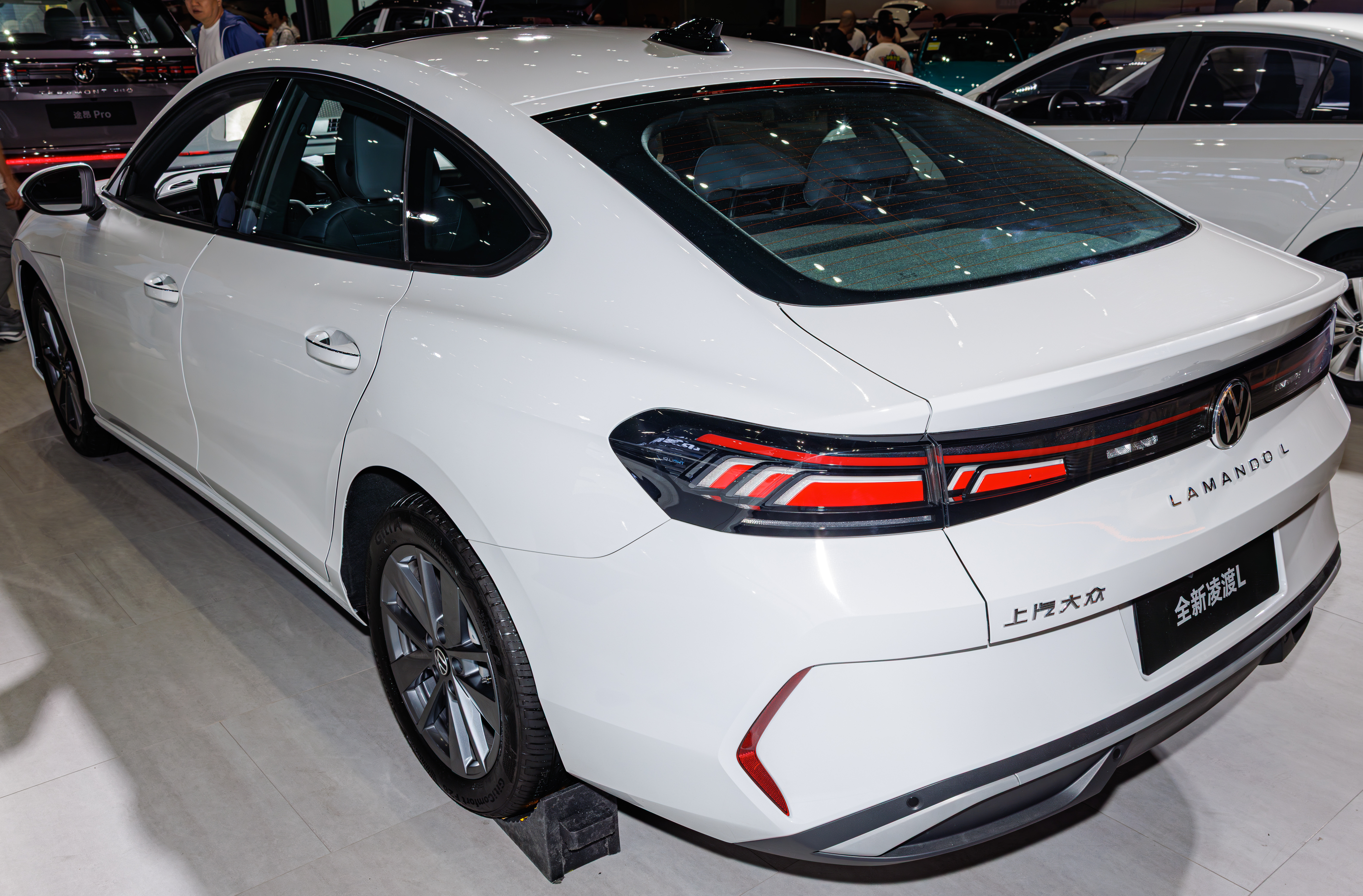
Facelift (Rear view)

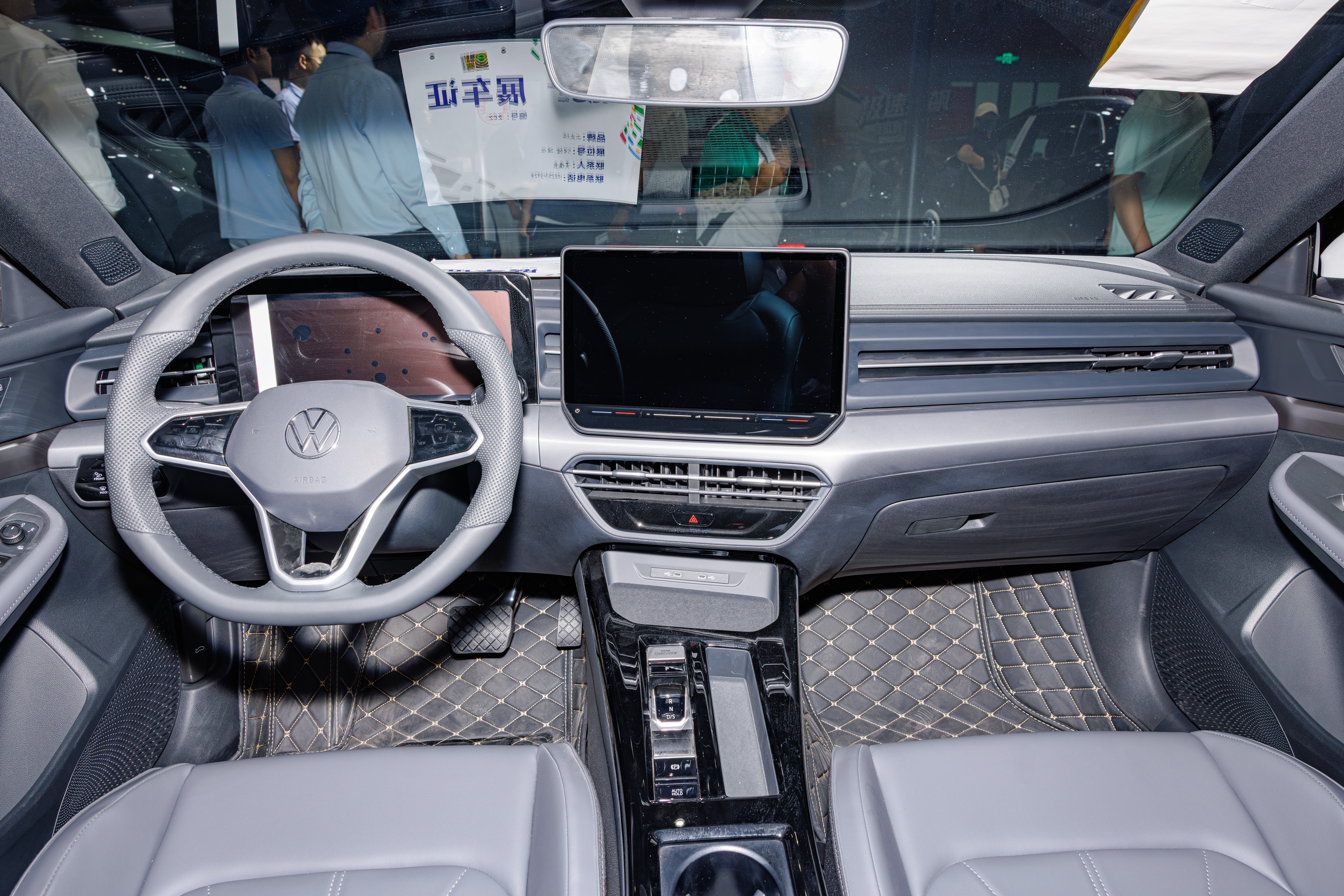
Interior (Facelift)

== Production ==
| Year | Production |
|---|---|
| 2014 | 3,080 |
| 2015 | 103,573 |
| 2016 | 146,285 |
| 2017 | 138,943 |
| 2018 | 141,076 |
| 2019 | 92,903 |
| 2020 | 65,730 |
| 2021 | 58,551 |
| 2022 | 99,966 |
| 2023 | 106,023 |

== Custom‐built Lamando 5XL ==
Video on YouTube

Based on the China‑only 2022 Volkswagen Lamando L—which originally features a standard five‑seat layout and a width of 71.9 inches (1.8 m)—the Lamando 5XL has been stretched to nearly 120 inches (over 3 m) wide, enabling a seating configuration that reportedly accommodates eight to ten passengers.

According to the reports, the project involved cutting the car along its center and inserting extra sheet metal between the wheels, as well as designing custom front and rear fascias that retain key styling cues despite the dramatic increase in width.

Notably, while the build retains the original turbocharged 1.4‑liter engine, its position is shifted to the driver's side, resulting in a unique layout and leaving a conspicuous gap on the passenger side of the engine bay—a detail widely discussed on online forums and social media.

== See also ==
- Volkswagen Lavida Pro
