= Top Gear (2014 TV series) =

- Presented by: Cheng Lei; Richie Jen; Tian Liang; Ma Dong; Ou Han-sheng "The Stig"
- Country of origin: China
- Original language: Mandarin
- No. of seasons: 2
- No. of episodes: 20

Original release
- Network: Shanghai Dragon TV
- Release: November 12, 2014 – December 21, 2015

Top Gear is a Chinese television series about motor vehicles, primarily on cars, and is an adaptation of the British television series Top Gear. The show premiered on 13 November 2014 on the network Shanghai Dragon TV. Series 1 was hosted by Cheng Lei, Richie Jen, and Tian Liang, Series 2 by Cheng Lei, Ma Dong, and Ou Han-sheng. The show also features a segment similar to Star in a Reasonably Priced Car (Ford Focus in Series 1 and Volkswagen Lamando in Series 2) and a Chinese Stig, whose identity is currently unknown.

== Episodes ==
Total	Episode	Reviews	Features	Guests	Air Date
Series 1
1	1	Porsche 918 Spyder	• Drive 310 kilometers from Zhangye to Jiayu Pass with a battery/fuel range of exactly 310 km left (Tesla Model S • Ford Mondeo)	Qiao Zhenyu • Michelle Ye • Tiger Hu • Ma Tianyu • Alan Ko • Cica Zhou • Jiang Wu	12 November 2014
2	2	Ferrari F12berlinetta	• Drive from Dali to Geladan (Jaguar XF • DS 6WR • Polaris RZR) to watch the night sky	Chopstick Brothers	19 November 2014
3	3	Jaguar F-Type R	• Climb to Bilutu Peak in the Badain Jaran Desert (Toyota Tundra • Arctic Cat Wildcat)	Zheng Kai • Gülnezer Bextiyar	26 November 2014
4	4	McLaren 650S	• Race near West Lake (Volkswagen Golf • bicycle • public transit) • Parkour vs. BMX vs. Chevrolet Cruze	Zhang Liang	3 December 2014
5	5	Bentley Continental GT V8 S		Gary Chaw	10 December 2014
6	6	Aston Martin Vanquish Volante			17 December 2014
7	7	KTM X-Bow GT			24 December 2014
8	8	Maserati GranTurismo MC Stradale		Kevin Cheng	7 January 2015
9	9	BMW M235i • Mercedes-Benz CLA 45 AMG • MINI Paceman JCW	• "Triathlon" in a zoo with Land Rover Discovery	Wu Chun	14 January 2015
10	10	Ford Mustang			21 January 2015
Series 2
11	1	N/A	• Race across Shanghai during morning rush hour (public transit • bicycle • boat • Toyota Reiz) • Wingsuit flying vs. drifting (Subaru BRZ) in Tianmen Mountain	Aarif Rahman	19 October 2015
12	2	N/A	• Drive ¥300,000 (about $45,000) sports cars (Porsche 996 Carrera 4 • Mercedes-Benz SL500 • Ferrari 360) across desert	Wong Cho-lam	26 October 2015
13	3	BMW i8	• Farewells to a to-be-decommissioned 14-year-old Volkswagen Polo	Ming Dao	2 November 2015
14	4	Caterham Seven	• Package delivery challenge (Arctic Cat utility task vehicle • Fengxian (奉贤) bus)	Christy Chung	9 November 2015
15	5	N/A	• London tour (Jaguar E-Type Roadster • Peel P50 • Abbot self-propelled gun) • Travel to the Top Gear test track and Waddesdon Manor in vehicles with Chinese connection (Benelli electric bicycle • TX4 • Chang'an Eado) • Race to Goodison Park in British lightweight sports cars (Morgan 3-Wheeler • Caterham Seven • Radical SR3)	Pan Xiaoting • Jeffrey Kung	16 November 2015
16	6	N/A	• Uber driver challenge in ¥400,000 (about $60,000) cars (Audi A6 • Chevrolet Camaro • Ford Taurus (Chinese version) • hot hatch face-off (Volkswagen Golf R • Renault Mégane RS)	Kelly Lin • Ho-Pin Tung	23 November 2015
17	7	N/A	• Race across Chongqing (Volkswagen Lamando • NIU eScooter • public transit) Part 1	Jimmy Lin	30 November 2015
18	8	Porsche 911 GT3	• Race across Chongqing Part 2 • Off-road SUV challenge (Toyota Land Cruiser Prado • Ford Everest • Jeep Wrangler Unlimited Sahara) on the Hulunbuir Prairie	Stephen Fung	7 December 2015
19	9	Lamborghini Huracán • Volkswagen Golf GTI	• Train for the CTCC	Lynn Hung	14 December 2015
20	10	McLaren 625C	• Race to Mount Putuo (Peugeot 308 • Roewe E50 • Maserati Quattroporte GTS) with ¥500 (about $75) for gas and tolls	Chang Chen	21 December 2015

== History ==
The first attempt at a Chinese Top Gear was in 2011.

In May 2014, BBC announced that it has signed a deal with Honyee Media to produce a local version of Top Gear in China. On 13 November 2014, the first series of the Top Gear China premiered on Shanghai Dragon Television, presented by Cheng Lei, a veteran Chinese TV presenter, Richie Jen, a Taiwanese singer and actor, and Tian Liang, a former Olympic gold-medalist in diving.

Production started in July 2014. Filming took place in various locations, such as: Inner Mongolia, Xinjiang, Chongqing, Guizhou, Shanghai, Beijing, and Wuxi.

== Reception ==
Season 2 has had a total audience of 217 million with 5 episodes.
