= Volkswagen Jetta =

Small family car manufactured by Volkswagen

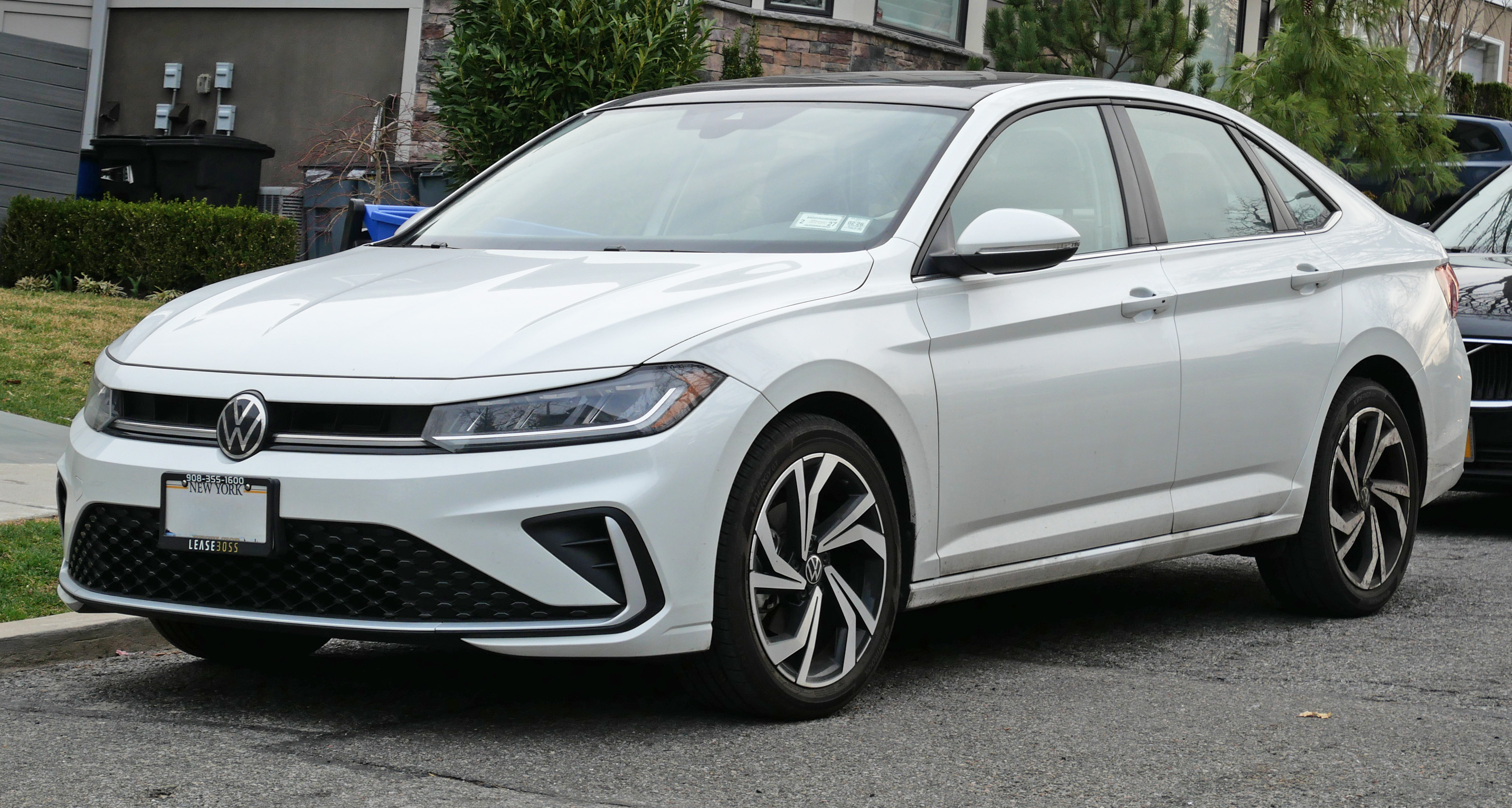
- 2025 Volkswagen Jetta SEL

Overview
- Manufacturer: Volkswagen
- Production: 1979–present

Body and chassis
- Class: Compact car (C)

The Volkswagen Jetta is a compact car/small family car manufactured and marketed by Volkswagen since 1979. Positioned to fill a sedan niche slightly above the Golf hatchback, it has been marketed over seven generations, variously as the Atlantic, Vento, Bora, City Jetta, Jetta City, GLI, Jetta, Clasico, and Sagitar (in China).

The Jetta has been offered in two- and four-door saloon/sedan and sometimes as five-door wagon/estate versions. Since the original 1980 version, the car has grown in size and power with each generation. By mid-2011, almost 10 million Jettas had been produced and sold around the world. As of April 2014, Volkswagen marketed over 14 million Jettas, becoming its top-selling model.

== Nameplate etymology ==
Numerous sources note that the Jetta nameplate derives from the Atlantic "jet stream" during a period when Volkswagen named its vehicles after prominent winds and currents (e.g. the Passat after the German word for trade wind, the Bora after bora, and the Scirocco after sirocco).

A 2013 report by former VW advertising copywriter Bertel Schmitt said that after consulting VW sources including former Volkswagen of America Chief Dr. Carl Hahn and former Volkswagen sales chief W.P. Schmidt, no evidence suggested that Volkswagen employed a naming theme for its front-drive, water-cooled vehicles, nor was there evidence that the names derived from a theme or that a naming system "was ever announced, either officially or confidentially."

== First generation (A1, Type 16; 1979) ==
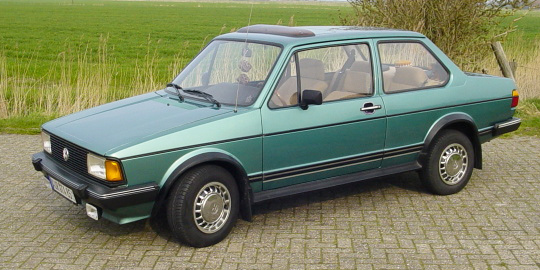
Volkswagen Jetta two-door (Germany)

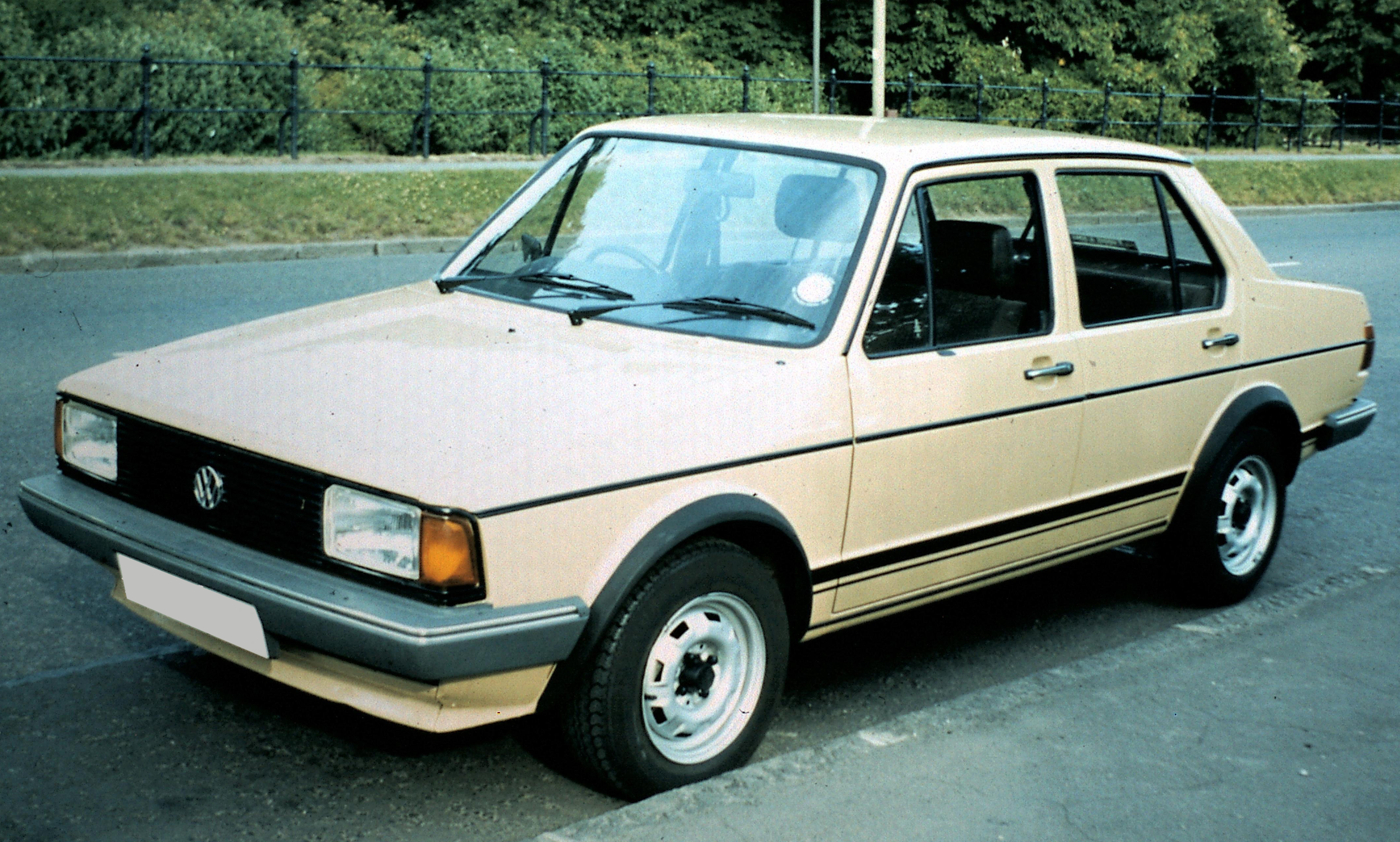
VW Jetta I four-door in 1980

Although the Golf (known as the Rabbit in the US and Canada) reached considerable success in the North American markets, Volkswagen saw that the hatchback body style lacked some of the appeal to those who preferred the traditional three-box configuration. The styling of the 1970 AMC Gremlin was controversial for truncating the Hornet sedan, but Volkswagen stylists reversed the process by essentially grafting a new trunk onto the tail of the Golf to produce a larger Jetta saloon. The Jetta became the best-selling European car in the United States, Canada, and Mexico. The car was also popular in Europe, including the United Kingdom, Germany, and Turkey.

The Jetta was introduced to the world at the 1979 Frankfurt Auto Show. Production of the first generation began in August 1979 at the Wolfsburg plant. In Mexico, the Mk1 Jetta was known as the "Volkswagen Atlantic".

The car was available as a two-door sedan (replacing the aging two-door, rear-engined, rear-wheel drive Volkswagen Beetle sedan in the United States and Canada) and four-door sedan body styles, both of which shared a traditional three-box design. Like the first-generation Golf, its angular styling was penned at ItalDesign by Giorgetto Giugiaro. Styling differences could be found depending on the market. In most of the world, the car was available with composite headlamps, while in the US, it was only available with rectangular sealed beam lamps due to Federal Motor Vehicle Safety Standard 108 (FMVSS 108). The suspension setup was identical to the Golf, and consisted of a MacPherson strut setup in front and a twist-beam rear suspension. It shared its 2,400 mm (94.5 in) wheelbase with its hatchback counterpart, although overall length was up by 380 millimetres (15 in). The capacity of the luggage compartment was 377 litres (13.3 ft^{3}), making the Jetta reasonably practical. To distinguish the car from the Golf, interiors were made more upscale in all markets. This included velour seating and color coordinated sill to sill carpeting.

Engine choices varied considerably depending on the local market. Most were based on 827 engines of the era. Choices in petrol engines ranged from a 1.1 litre four-cylinder engine producing 37 kW (50 hp; 50 PS), to a 1.8-litre I4 which made 82 kW (110 hp; 111 PS) and 150 newton-metres (111 lbf⋅ft) of torque. Some cars were equipped with carburetors, while others were fuel-injected using K or KE Jetronic supplied by Robert Bosch GmbH. Diesel engine choices included a 1.6-litre making 37 kilowatts (50 hp; 50 PS) and a turbocharged version of the same engine which produced 51 kilowatts (68 hp; 69 PS) and 130 newton-metres (96 lbf⋅ft) of torque.

Volkswagen briefly considered producing the Jetta in a plant located in Sterling Heights, Michigan, U.S. However, due to declining sales in North America, the decision was postponed and abandoned in 1982. The site was subsequently sold to Chrysler in 1983. This generation of the Jetta was also produced in SFR Yugoslavia, Bosnia and Herzegovina, under the joint venture Tvornica Automobila Sarajevo (TAS) for the Balkan area.

== Second generation (A2, Type 20E/1G; 1984) ==
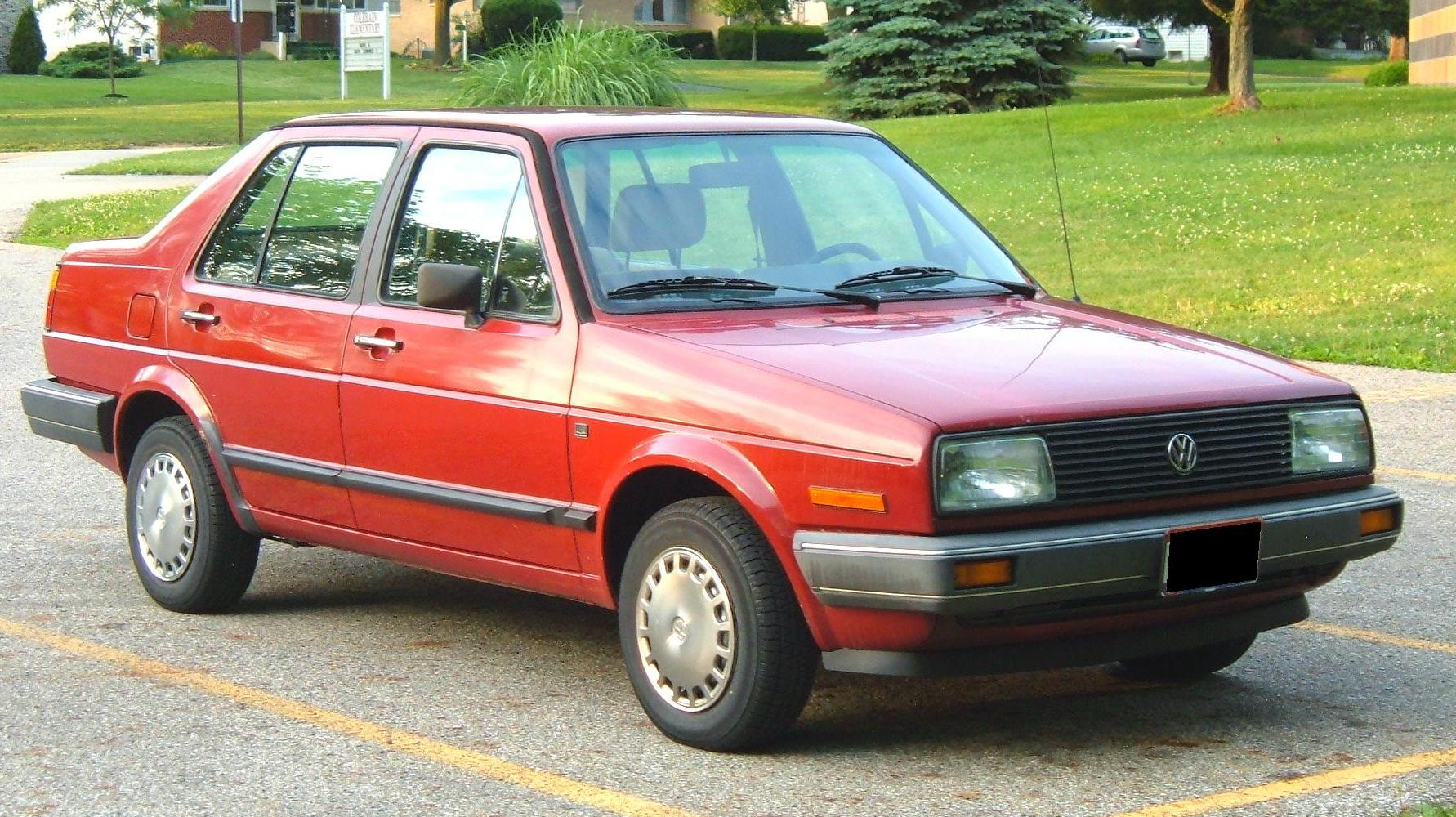
Volkswagen Jetta 4-door (USA)

The second generation of the Jetta is the longest-running so far. Introduced to Europe in early 1984 and North America in 1985, it proved to be a sales success for Volkswagen. The car secured the title of best-selling European car in North America, and outsold the similar Golf by two to one in that market. Based on the all-new second-generation Golf platform, the car was larger, heavier, and could seat five people instead of four as in the Jetta Mk1. Exterior dimensions increased in all directions. Overall length was up by 100 mm (3.9 in), the wheelbase grew 66 mm (2.6 in), and the width went up 53 mm (2.1 in). The suspension setup was basically unchanged from the first generation, albeit refined slightly, with the inclusion of a separate subframe for mounting the front control arms to help noise isolation, as well as improved rubber mountings for all components. Aerodynamics improved considerably, with a drag coefficient of 0.36. With a 470-litre (16.6 ft^{3}) luggage compartment, the trunk had grown nearly as large as some full-sized American sedans. Interior room was also increased by 14 percent, which changed the EPA class from sub-compact to compact.

In Germany, Volkswagens were assembled in a new plant at Wolfsburg in Assembly Hall 54, which was heavily robotised in an effort to make build quality more consistent. New innovations on the second generation included an optional trip computer (referred to as the MFA, German Multi-Funktions-Anzeige), as well as silicone dampened engine and transmission mounts to reduce noise, vibration, and harshness levels. In 1988, a more advanced, fully electronic fuel injection system, known as the Digifant engine management system, became available.

As with its predecessor, the second-generation Jetta was offered as a two- or four-door sedan. External changes throughout the series' run were few: the front-quarter windows were eliminated in 1988 (along with a grille and door trim change), and larger body-colored bumpers and lower side skirts were added in 1990.

In 2007, Volkswagen of America held a contest to find the diesel-powered Volkswagen with the highest distance traveled on the original engine. The winning car was a 1986 Jetta Turbodiesel in Blue Rock, Ohio, which had 562,000 miles (904,000 km). A local dealer verified the odometer reading. Notable on this particular car was that it also had the original muffler despite being located in an area subject to road salt in the winter.

== Third generation (A3, Typ 1H; 1992) ==
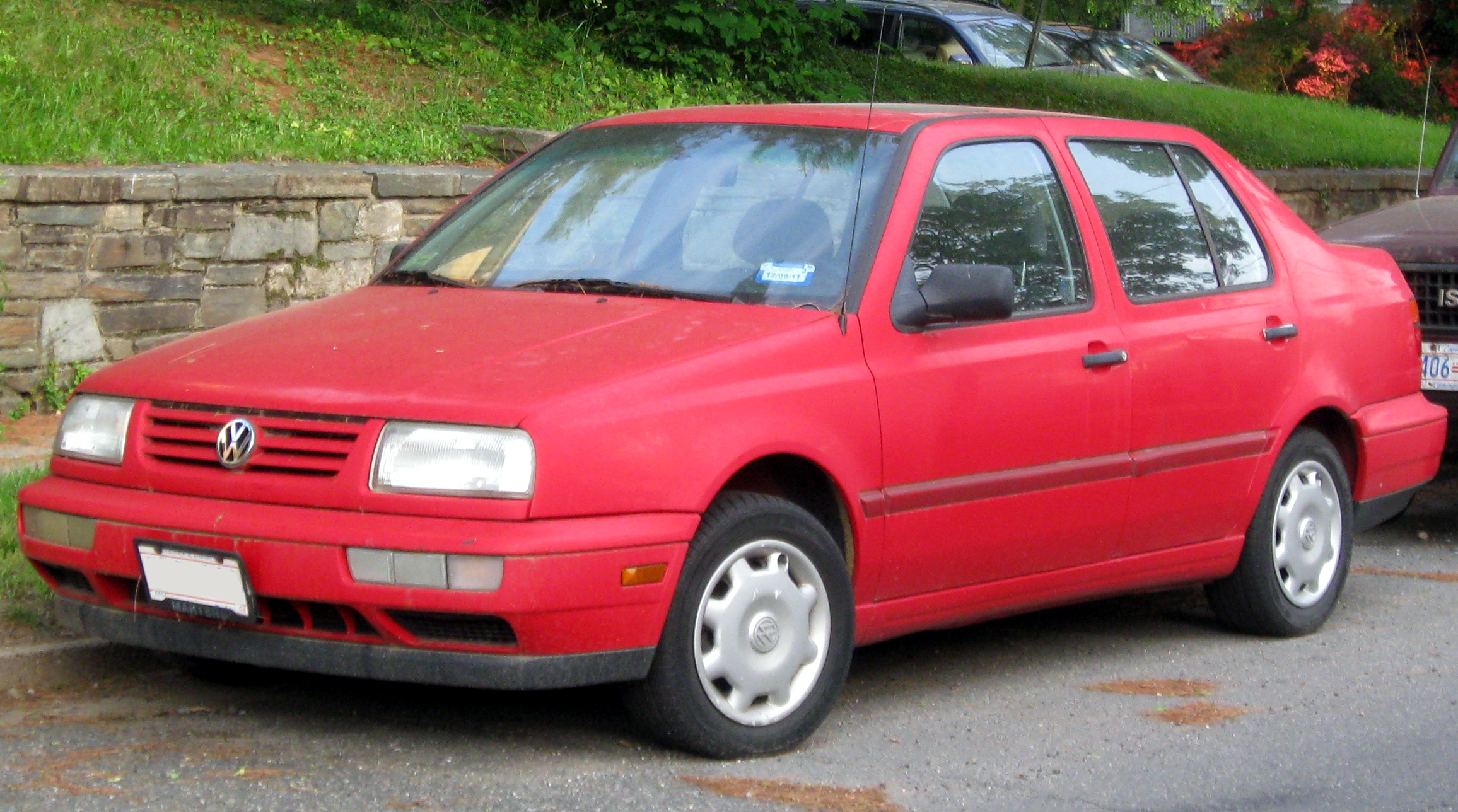
Volkswagen Jetta (USA)

For its third generation, the Jetta was renamed the Volkswagen Vento in European countries, following the precedent of naming cars after winds ("Vento" means "wind" in both Portuguese and Italian). This generation debuted in Europe in 1992, followed by North America in 1993 (as the Jetta) after production delays and quality problems at the Volkswagen plant in Puebla, Mexico. It went on sale in most of Europe in the first quarter of the year, though it did not arrive on the British market until September 1992. Because of the success of the second generation in North America, Volkswagen decided to keep the Jetta nameplate. However, the car was given the Vento name in Europe to appeal to a younger market.

Styling was penned by a design team led by Herbert Schafer, and the car became more aerodynamic than the previous generation. Although visually similar to the second-generation Jetta, there were many refinements underneath. The two-door model was dropped, and aerodynamics were improved, with the car now having a drag coefficient of 0.32. This included a new structure which now met worldwide crash standards. Suspensions were an evolutionary rather than revolutionary refinement of the setup on previous editions, and mainly consisted of a wider track, and even maintaining backwards compatibility with older models. In addition, the car became more environmentally friendly with the use of recycled plastics, CFC-free air conditioning systems, and paint that did not contain heavy metals.

This generation of the car is widely credited for keeping Volkswagen from pulling out of the North American market. At the time of its introduction in 1993, Volkswagen of America's sales hit a low not seen since the 1950s, as the division sold only 43,902 cars in that year. Sales began slowly due to the aforementioned issues at the Puebla plant. However, sales rebounded dramatically in the following years, mostly based on the strength of the Jetta, which continued to be the best-selling Volkswagen in the United States.

== Fourth generation (A4, Typ 1J; 1999) ==
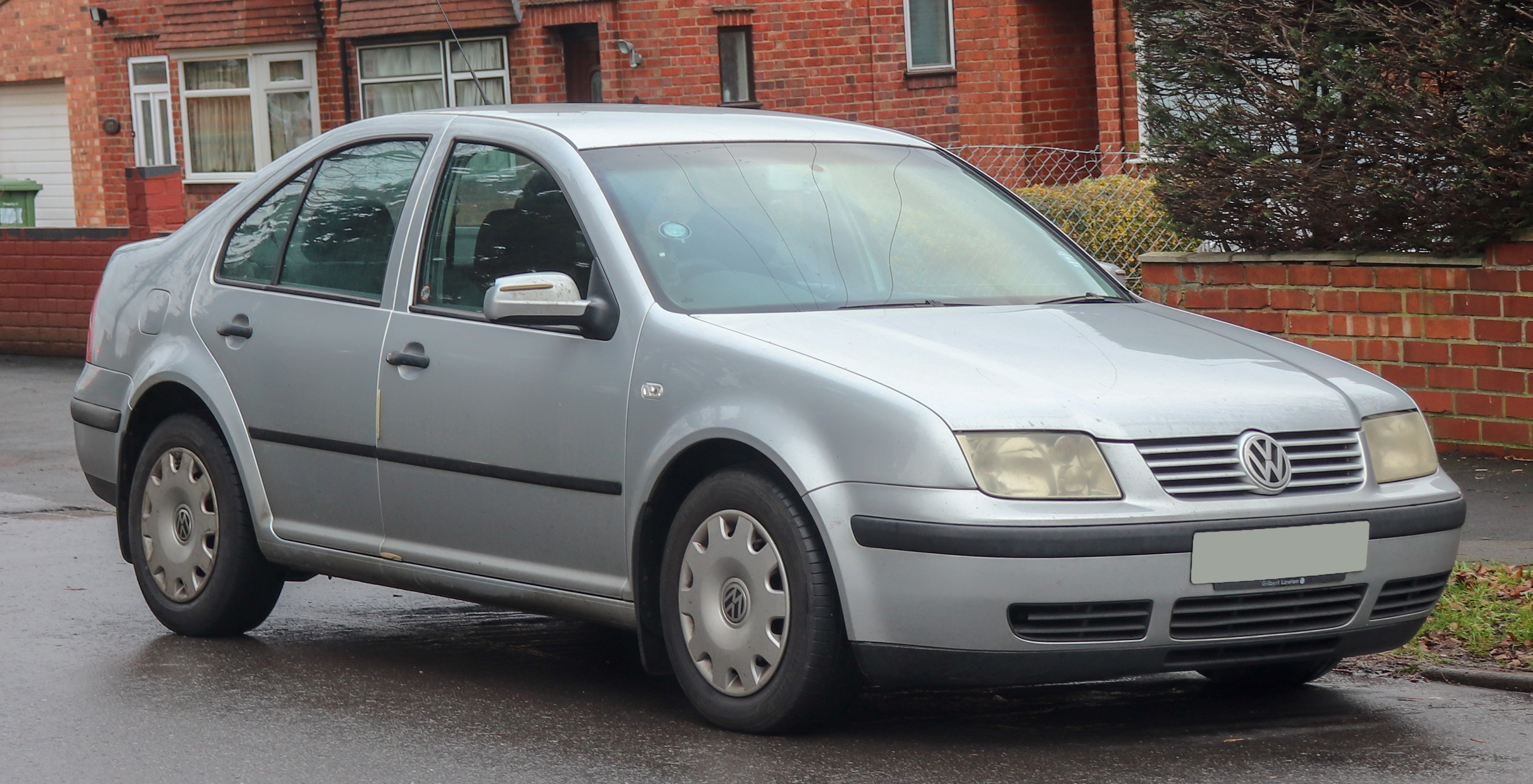
Volkswagen Bora (UK)

Production of the fourth generation began in July 1999. Carrying on the wind nomenclature, the car was known as the Volkswagen Bora in much of the world. Bora is a winter wind which blows intermittently over the coast of the Adriatic Sea, as well as in parts of Greece, Russia, Turkey, and in the Sliven region of Bulgaria. In North America and South Africa, the Jetta moniker was kept once more due to the continued popularity of the car in those markets.

The Bora debuted shortly after its larger sibling, the fifth-generation Passat, with which it shared many styling cues. The rounded shape and arched roofline served as the new Volkswagen styling trademark, abandoning traditional sharp creases for more curved corners. A distinguishing feature of the Bora is its Whiptenna, an antenna on the rear end of the roof which was said to incur less drag than traditional antennas due to its short length and leeward position. For the first time, the rear passenger doors differed from those of a five-door Golf. The car was also offered as an estate/wagon (whose rear doors are also non-interchangeable with the others). New on this generation was some advanced options such as rain sensor-controlled windshield wipers and automatic climate control. However, these were expensive extras and many buyers did not specify them on their cars; as a result, the used market has many sparsely equipped models.

Although slightly shorter overall than the Vento, the Bora saw the wheelbase extended slightly. Some powertrain options were carried over. Nevertheless, a new internal combustion engine was offered: the 1.8-litre turbo four-cylinder (often referred to as the 1.8 20vT). The suspension setup remained much as before. However, it was softened considerably in most models to give a comfortable ride, which was met with some criticism as it was still quite hard in comparison with rivals such as vehicles offered from French carmakers.

== Fifth generation (A5, Typ 1K5; 2005) ==
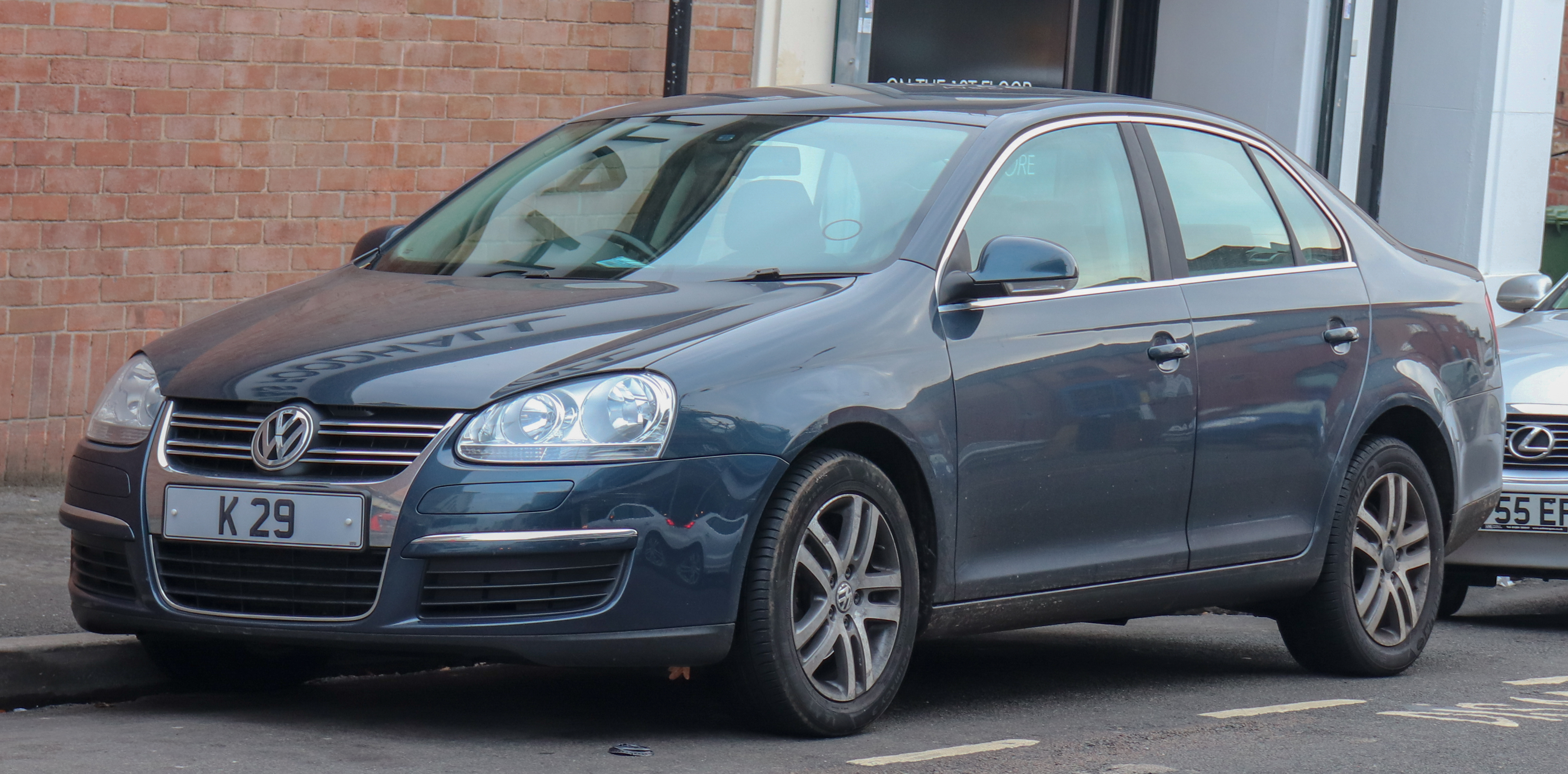
Volkswagen Jetta (A5)

The fifth generation Jetta debuted at the Los Angeles Auto Show on 5 January 2005. After the New Beetle, it was the second Volkswagen product to make its world debut at a US auto show. The A5 Jetta sedan went on sale in the US before any other country, reflecting the importance of the car in that market for Volkswagen.

The fifth generation was marketed as the Jetta in most markets, and as Bora in Mexico and Colombia, Vento in Argentina and Chile, and as the Sagitar in China. The Jetta Mk5 is 170 millimetres (6.7 in) longer, 30 millimetres (1.2 in) wider, and has a 70 millimetres (2.8 in) longer wheelbase than the previous iteration. Interior room has increased from 2.46 cubic metres (87 cu ft) to 2.58 cubic metres (91 cu ft). In particular, rear legroom was increased by 65 millimetres (2.6 in) over the fourth generation. Luggage compartment volume is up to 453 litres (16 cu ft). One major change is the introduction of the first multi-link independent rear suspension in a Jetta. The design of the rear suspension has a strong resemblance to the one found in the Ford Focus. Volkswagen reportedly hired engineers from Ford who designed the suspension on the Focus.

Styling included a new chrome front grille, first seen on the Golf Mk5 R32, which has since spread to other models. Some critics appreciated the new styling, while others dismissed it as just as bland as the fourth generation.

The A5 Jetta was manufactured in the largest volumes in Mexico. VW spent US$800 million to upgrade its Puebla facilities for this model's production. This included a US$290 million new engine production line for the 5-cylinder power plant, a US$50 million investment in the press shop, and a US$200 million purchase of 460 robots, which increased automation by 80%. Final A5 assembly also took place in China and South Africa for those markets. Like initial production of the second generation in China, the Asian and African plants built the car from a complete knock down (CKD) kit shipped from the factory in Puebla. Local assembly in Kaluga, Russia, started in early 2008. Production also began in India in 2008 at the Škoda factory in Aurangabad.

== Sixth generation (A6, Typ 5C6; 2010) ==
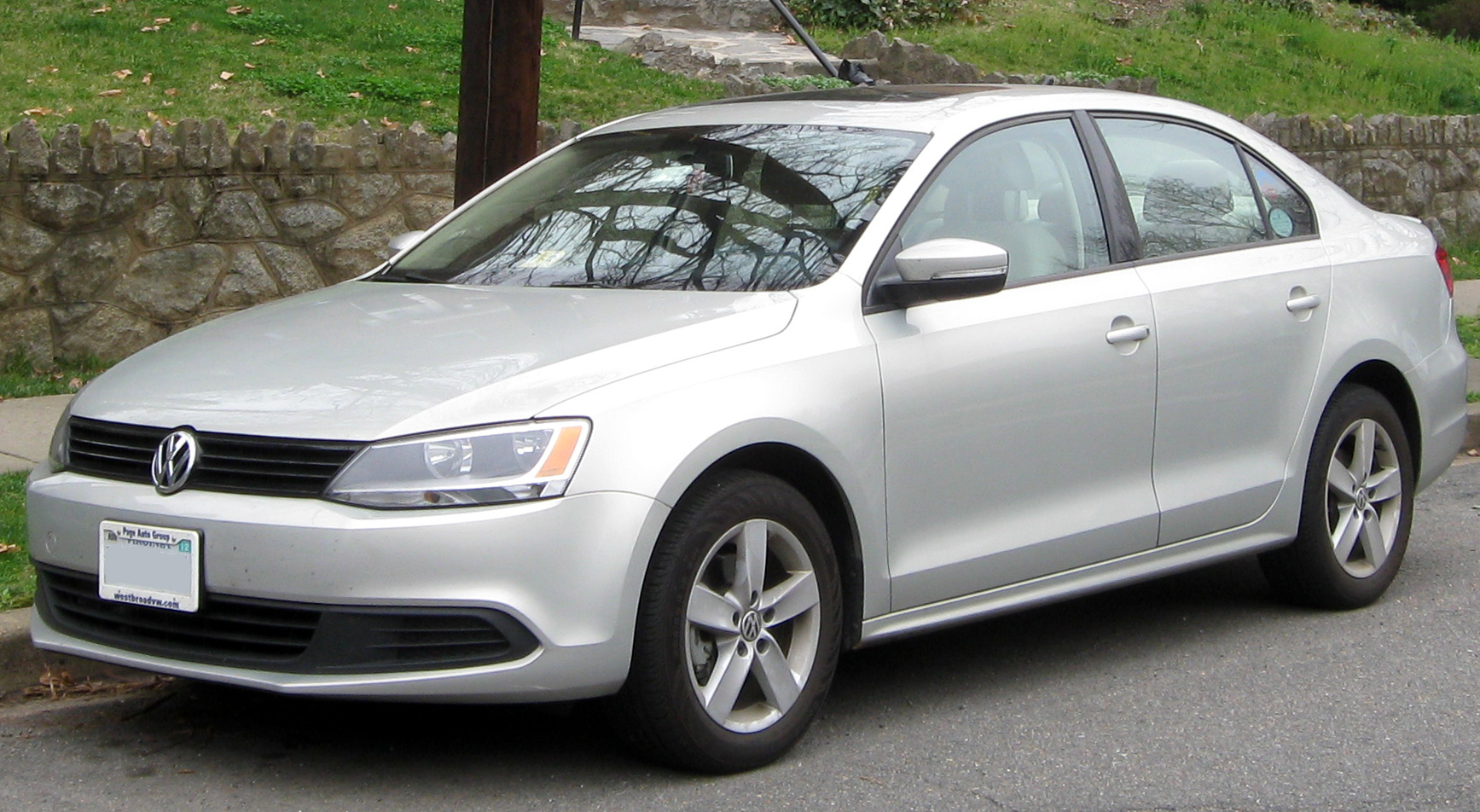
Volkswagen Jetta (A6)

The sixth-generation Volkswagen Jetta, known as the NCS (New Compact Sedan) during its development, was announced for the North American market on 16 June 2010. The A6 Jetta marked the departure from being a sedan derivative of the Golf, opting for a dedicated bodywork. It is partly based on the PQ35 platform shared with the Golf Mk6. The new model was larger and less expensive to manufacture than the previous generation, making the vehicle more competitive against mainstream rivals in the compact car segment, as part of Volkswagen's goal of reaching sales of 800,000 units in North America by 2018. The A6 Jetta was primarily designed by Volkswagen Mexico under the supervision of Volkswagen Germany.

Volkswagen's target of increasing its North American sales removed the Jetta from the premium compact car market. This forced many cost-cutting measures to be made for the North American models, which included a lower quality trim material for the interior and the replacement of leather with leatherette as an optional seating upholstery (leather was still available on Canadian-spec models). The North American version also lost the multi-link rear suspension of the previous generation. The turbo hybrid version was unveiled in January 2012 at the North American International Auto Show, and was discontinued in 2016.

This is the latest generation to be offered in Europe.

== Seventh generation (A7; 2018) ==
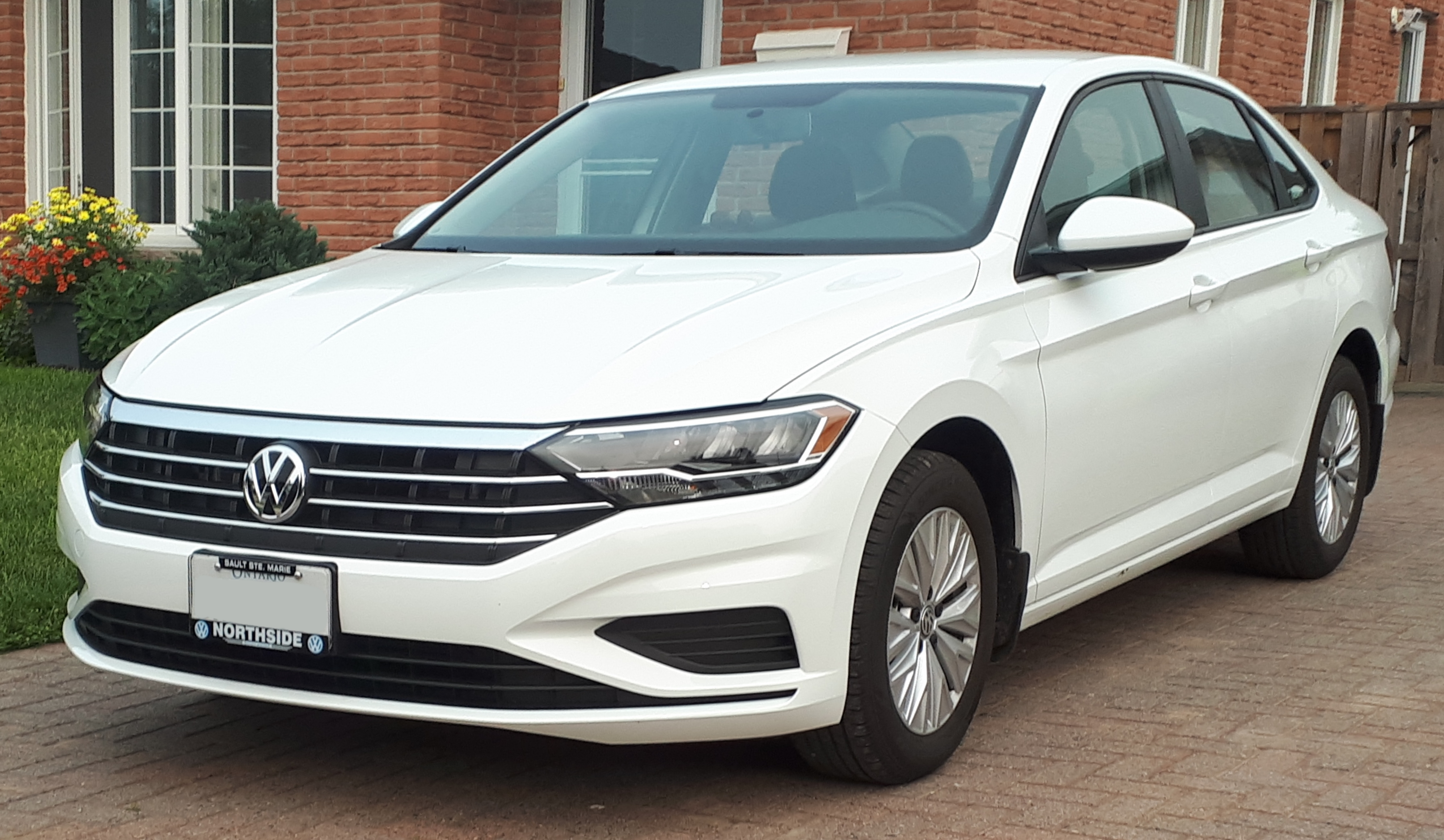
Volkswagen Jetta (A7)

The seventh-generation 2018 (2019 in the US) Jetta debuted at the 2018 North American International Auto Show in Detroit, Michigan, on 14 January 2018, after Volkswagen released an exterior design sketch in December 2017. It is based on Volkswagen's MQB platform, which underpins other vehicles including the Golf and Atlas.

The A7 Jetta is larger than its predecessor, offers more interior room, and has the latest generation of Volkswagen's infotainment systems, including integration of Apple CarPlay and Android Auto. Its ten-color customizable ambient interior lighting includes lighting across the dashboard and instrument panel, front and rear doors, footwells, and the gauge "rings" of a newly available fully digital instrument cluster display, marketed as the "Digital Cockpit".

As with its predecessors, production of the A7 Jetta would continue at Volkswagen's assembly plant in Puebla, Mexico. It would reach Volkswagen dealerships in the US in the second quarter of 2018. A GLI model with a multi-link rear suspension would come as a 2020 model. However, the A7 Jetta would not be sold in the European market nor in right-hand drive countries. The MK7 was recently launched in Korea, where it became one of the top selling imported models.

The Chinese-spec long-wheelbase Volkswagen Sagitar was launched on 19 January 2019, both in Beijing and Shanghai. It is about 50 mm longer than the U.S.-spec model, and is equipped with independent suspension. This was an attempt to occupy the more upscale market than the Volkswagen Lavida built by SAIC-VW, which share similar looks. Production would continue at the FAW-VW Chengdu plant.

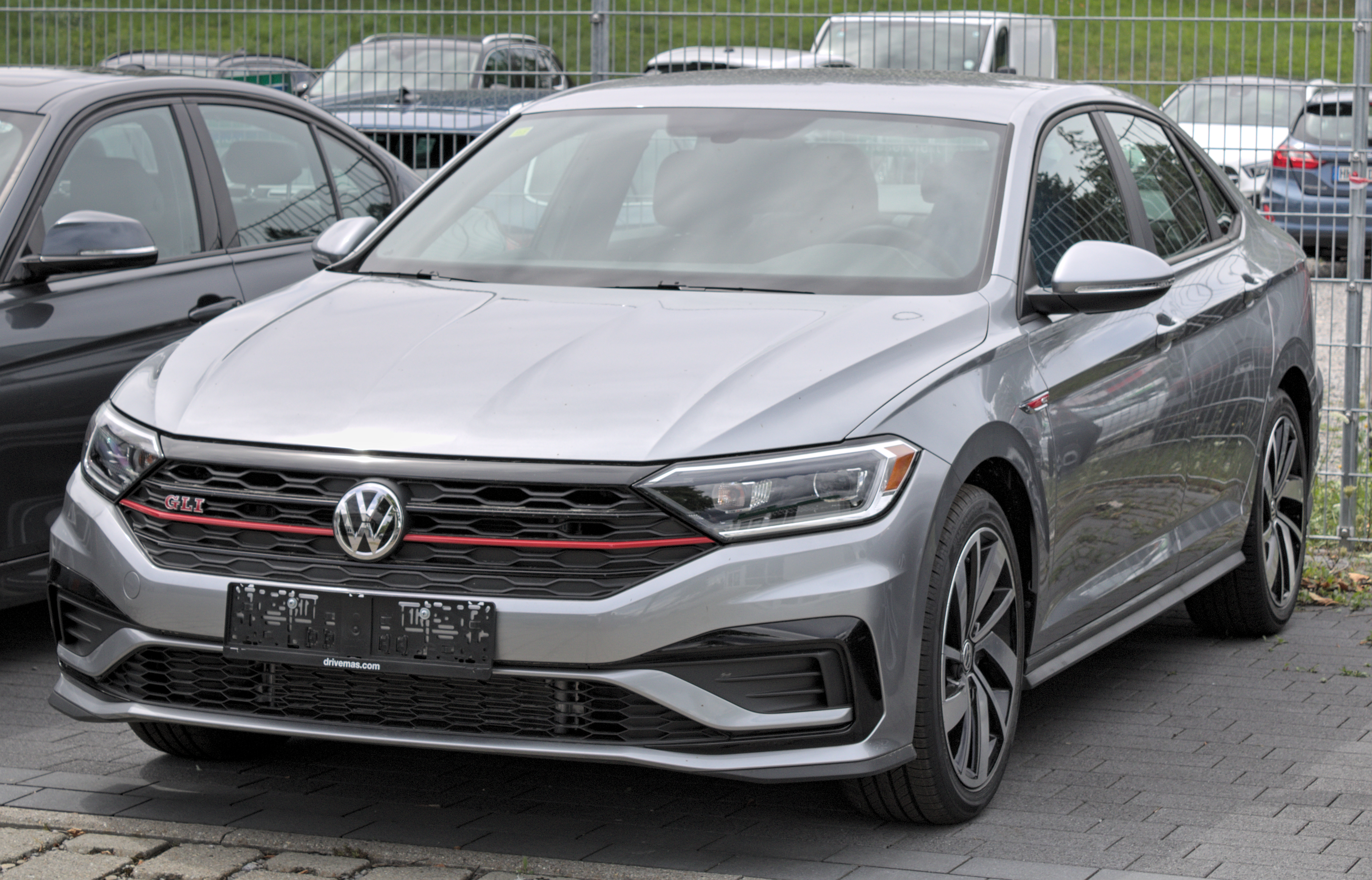
GLI Jetta

In 2022, the facelifted Jetta was revealed in Chicago. Bearing an updated look and design, the new C-segment sedan also gained added kit and a new engine. The 1.5 litre turbo four-cylinder replaced the long-serving 1.4 TSI. As for the GLI, it retained the EA888 2.0 litre four-cylinder turbo from the Golf GTI.

== Alternative-propulsion cars ==
In 2001, at the 18th International Electric Vehicle Symposium and Exhibition in Berlin, Volkswagen released two environmentally friendly cars: the Bora HyMotion and the Bora Electric.

The Bora HyMotion was a hydrogen powered variant of the Bora (the fourth generation of the Jetta) with a 75 kW fuel cell that could accelerate from 0 to 97 km/h (60 mph) in 12.5 seconds. With a 49-litre tank of cryogenically stored hydrogen, it had a range of 350 km (220 mi). Top speed was 140 km/h (87.0 mph).

In 2002, Volkswagen, along with Paul Scherrer Institute, released another hydrogen-powered car called the Bora Hy.Power. The car was powered by hydrogen compressed to a pressure of 320 bar (4600 psi). It had ratings very similar to the HyMotion, with a 75 kW (101 hp) power source. A special feature of the car was a 60-kilowatt supercapacitor which could boost power when needed and also recover energy when coasting.

Volkswagen had considered producing a mild hybrid version of the fifth generation mainly for the North American market, but never produced it. In 2013, Volkswagen produced a turbocharged full hybrid sixth generation for the North American market.

=== Biofuels ===
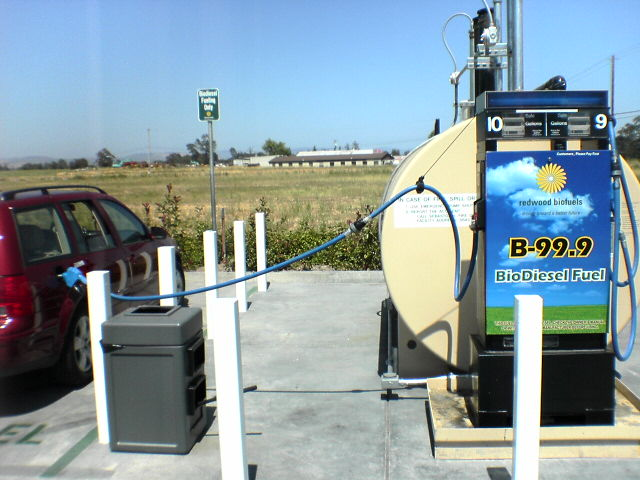
Wagon being fueled with biodiesel

Volkswagen released a Jetta MultiFuel in 1991, at first to the governments of the state of California and New York, then for limited retail sale in those states to the public. They are an early example of an E85 vehicle, burning a mixture of 85% ethanol and 15% gasoline. These Jettas can still be found on US roads.

Volkswagen also released a Bora TDI which was powered by SunFuel, a synthetic fuel developed in partnership with Royal Dutch Shell. The company also displayed the Bora TDI, powered by SunDiesel, which Volkswagen also developed with DaimlerChrysler, along with Choren Industries.

Use of the two most popular blends of biodiesel that are mostly biodiesel, B80 and B100, is not recommended in 2009 and 2010 US TDI engines.

In Brazil, until 2015, the Jetta was sold with the 2.0 L flex-fuel (marketed as "Total Flex") engine in Trendline and Comfortline trims. It could run on either E100 or Petrol. From the 2016 model year onwards, the 2.0 L flex-fuel was replaced by the 1.4 L TSI turbocharged engine from EA211 family, which runs exclusively on petrol.

=== Electric vehicle ===
In the early 1980s, Volkswagen released a limited production electric Jetta called the Jetta CityStromer. It featured a 24.8 hp (18.5 kW) powertrain (later 37.5 hp (28 kW)), with a range of 190 km (250 km in the later version).

The second concept vehicle was called the Bora Electric. It had a power rating that varied according to the operating conditions. The Bora Electric could accelerate from 0 to 100 km/h in 10 seconds with a range of 160 km. It was powered by a Lithium-ion battery. It was noted that its chance of success was limited in the marketplace, given the high cost of the electric drive system.

== Awards and recognition ==
In November 2008, the Jetta TDI (clean diesel) won the 2009 Green Car of the Year award from Green Car Journal. In 2015, however, as a result of the Volkswagen emissions scandal, the award was rescinded.

== Motorsport ==
From 2008 to 2010, Volkswagen and the Sports Car Club of America hosted the Volkswagen Jetta TDI Cup, using factory-prepared 2009 Jetta TDIs.

For the 2010 SCCA World Challenge season, Irish Mike's Racing campaigned GLIs in the touring car class. Todd Buras won rounds one and two at the Grand Prix of St. Petersburg and round 10 at Virginia International Raceway, while Chip Herr won round four at Mosport.

== Recalls ==
On 30 September 2011, Volkswagen of America announced a recall involving 2009–2012 Jetta and Jetta Sportwagen models with the 2.0L TDI engine. This recall pointed to a resonance condition with the number 2 fuel injector line and the fuel injector pulses, causing small cracks in the line which could leak.

=== Volkswagen emissions violations recall ===
In September 2015, it was discovered that some Volkswagen TDIs had exceeded the United States' legal emissions limits. These emissions violations, which would later be referred to as Volkswagen's "emissionsgate" or "dieselgate", affected the 2.0 L TDI diesel engines (the engines from 2008 that would later be in the Volkswagen TDIs in North America).

== Use in China ==
Many versions and derivations of Jetta has been built and produced in China by FAW-Volkswagen (FAW-VW) and SAIC Volkswagen (SAIC-VW), and the Jetta name itself has been used by FAW-VW as a new automotive brand since 2019.

The Volkswagen Jetta nameplate was produced from 1991 to 2019 by FAW-VW. It initially started as a rebadged version of the Mk2 Jetta, using the A2 platform. Later versions followed a different development path from the global Jetta, retaining the A2 platform until 2013, when it switched to the A05+ platform. In 2019, the Jetta nameplate was discontinued and spun off as a new brand called Jetta. The Jetta VA3 is the spiritual successor, as it is a sedan using the same A05+ platform.

The Volkswagen Bora has been produced by FAW-VW since 2001. It initially started as a rebadged version of the Mk4 Jetta (which was sold as the Bora in most markets). Later versions followed a different development path from the global Jetta, retaining the A4 (PQ34) platform until 2018, when it switched to the MQB A1 platform, similar to the global Mk7 Jetta.

The Volkswagen Sagitar has been produced by FAW-VW since 2006. It largely follows the design of the global Jetta, using the A5 (PQ35) platform from Mk5 to Mk6. For the Mk7 version, the Sagitar is still similar to the global Jetta (using the MQB A1 platform) except with a longer wheelbase of 2731mm.

The Volkswagen Lavida has been produced by SAIC-VW since 2008. It was based on a heavily modified FAW-VW first generation Bora (which itself was a rebadged Mk4 Jetta). In 2018, it also switched to the MQB A1 platform, similar to the 2018 Bora and global Mk7 Jetta.

Currently, the Bora and Lavida are considered to be similarly positioned as C segment cars, and the Sagitar is positioned slightly above them due to the longer wheelbase, while the Jetta VA3 is considered to be one segment below.

=== Jetta A2 (1991–2013) ===
The first known Jetta in China was the A2 model that was used as a passenger car and a taxicab.

The A2 was then given a facelift in April 1997, and was known as the Jetta King. Available engines were a 1.6-litre petrol engine called the EA113 for civilian cars and a 1.9-litre diesel engine only available for taxi models. A four-speed manual gearbox was standard, which could be replaced by a five-speed manual gearbox; a four-speed automatic gearbox was made available in November 1998. For 2002, the Jetta King was facelifted with a new exterior. Trim levels consisted of the AT, ATF, Avantgarde, CDX, CiF, CiX, CT, GDF, GiF, GT, GTI, GTX and Meeresbrise. This model was also converted into a two-door pickup truck in limited numbers.

The A2 was facelifted again in March 2010, with the same engines used by its predecessor, and was known as the Jetta Pioneer. This version of the Jetta was not offered in different trim levels, and was a single model for the Chinese market. A2-based Jetta production ended in March 2013, with the car being replaced by an independent model using the Volkswagen Group A05+ platform.

According to Carsalesbase.com, FAW-Volkswagen's Jetta A2 model has sold over 2.4 million cars.

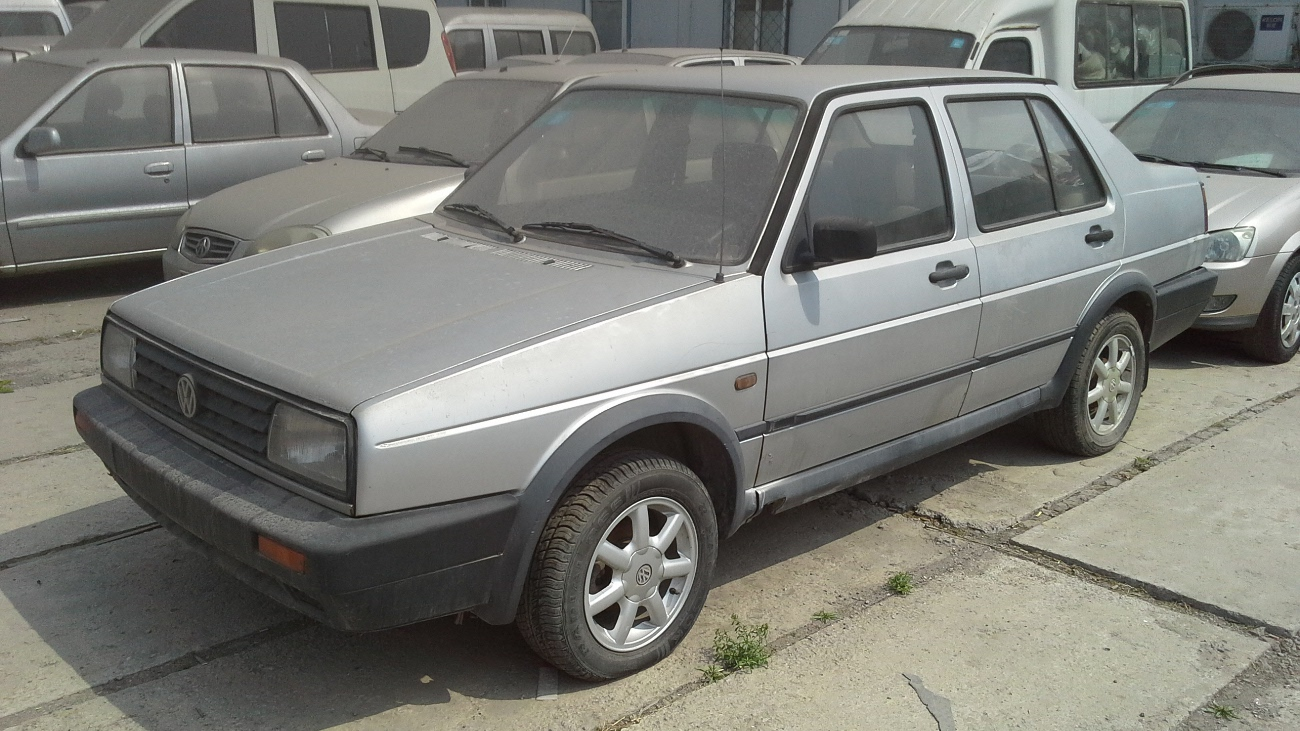
Volkswagen Jetta (China)

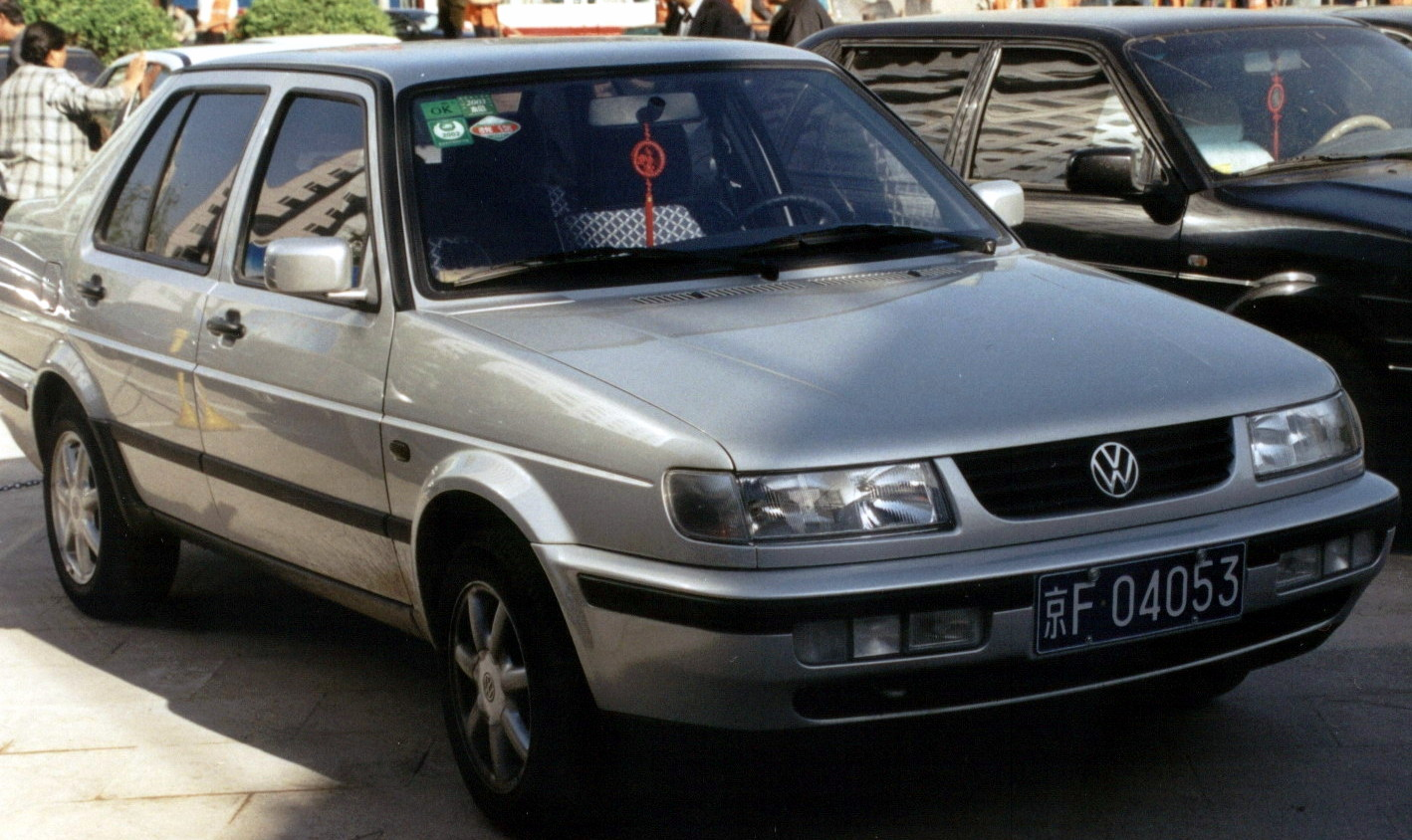
Volkswagen Jetta King (China)

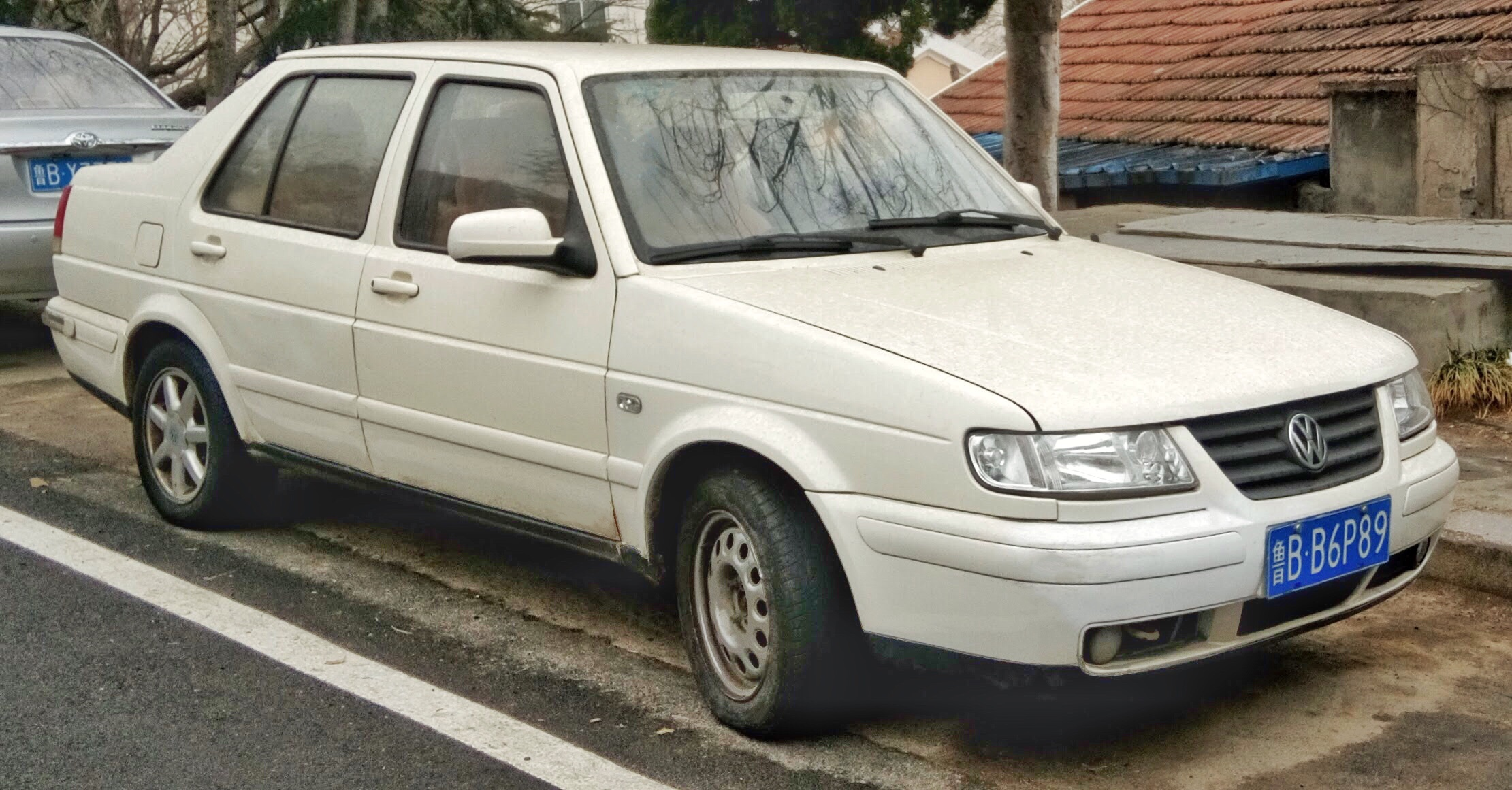
Volkswagen Jetta King minor facelift (China)

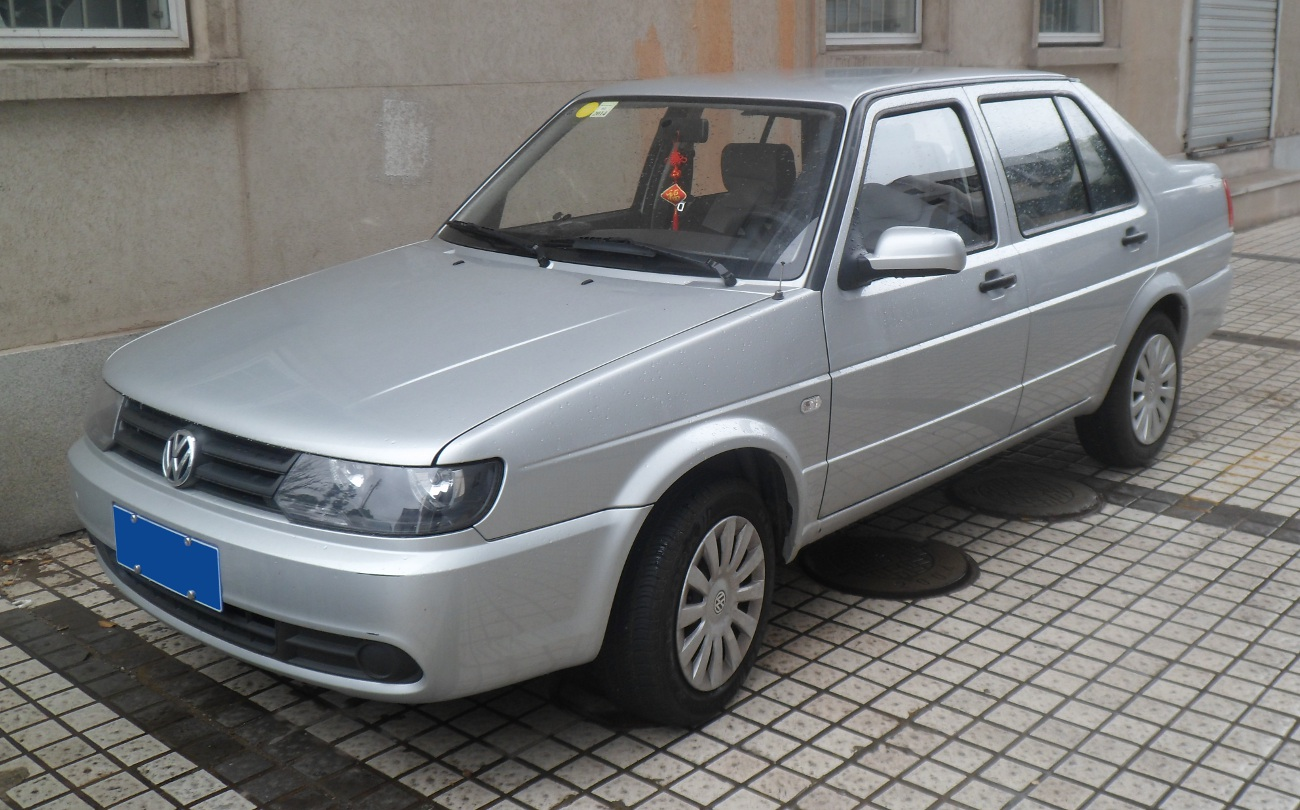
Volkswagen Jetta Pioneer (China)

=== Bora A4 (2001–present) ===
The second known Jetta in China was the A4 model sold under the Bora name, which commenced production in December 2001. It was given a facelift in 2006, and was available with the 1.6- and 1.8-litre EA113 petrol engine and a 1.9-litre diesel engine. A five-speed manual was available alongside a four-speed automatic transmission. A hatchback version was known as the Bora HS and was a badged Volkswagen Golf Mk4. Production for the first generation Bora ended in 2006, while the Bora HS ended production in 2008.

The Bora was facelifted in 2007 with two new engines, a 1.4-litre turbo and a 1.6, under the EA111 name. A five- and six-speed manual was standard alongside a seven-speed dual-clutch automatic gearbox. Production ended in 2015.

The third generation Bora commenced production in 2015 for the 2016 model year, with a new exterior and interior. 1.4-, 1.5-, and 1.6-litre engines were standard paired to five- and six-speed manual and a seven-speed dual-clutch automatic gearbox. This generation is still available as of May 2019 as the Bora Classic with three trim levels.

The fourth generation Bora was produced beginning in April 2018, and used Volkswagen's MQB platform. 1.4- and 1.5-litre engines were standard paired to a six-speed manual and seven-speed dual-clutch automatic gearbox.

According to Carsalesbase.com, FAW-Volkswagen's Bora model had sold over 2.6 million cars as of 2019.

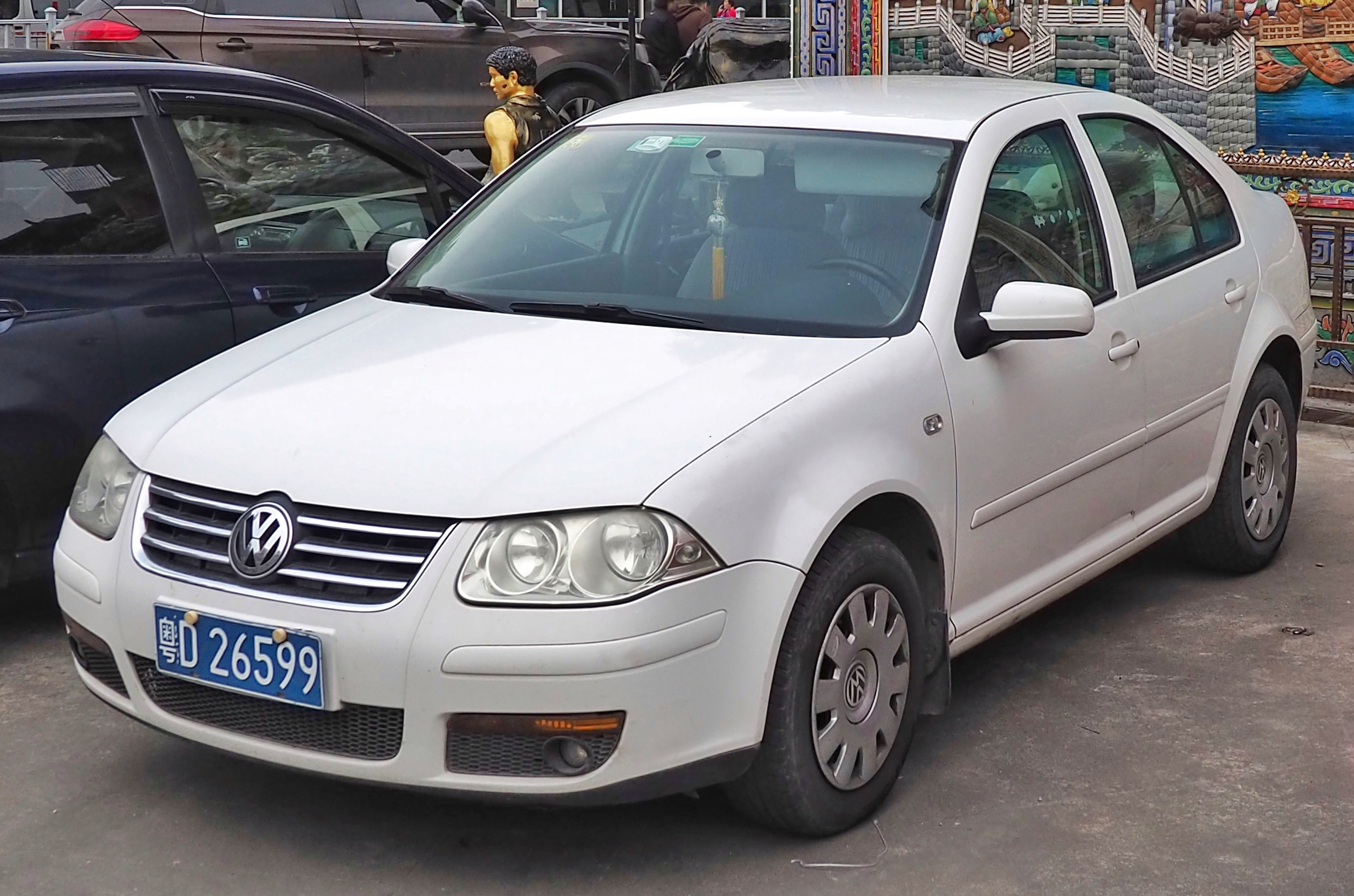
Volkswagen Bora (MK1)

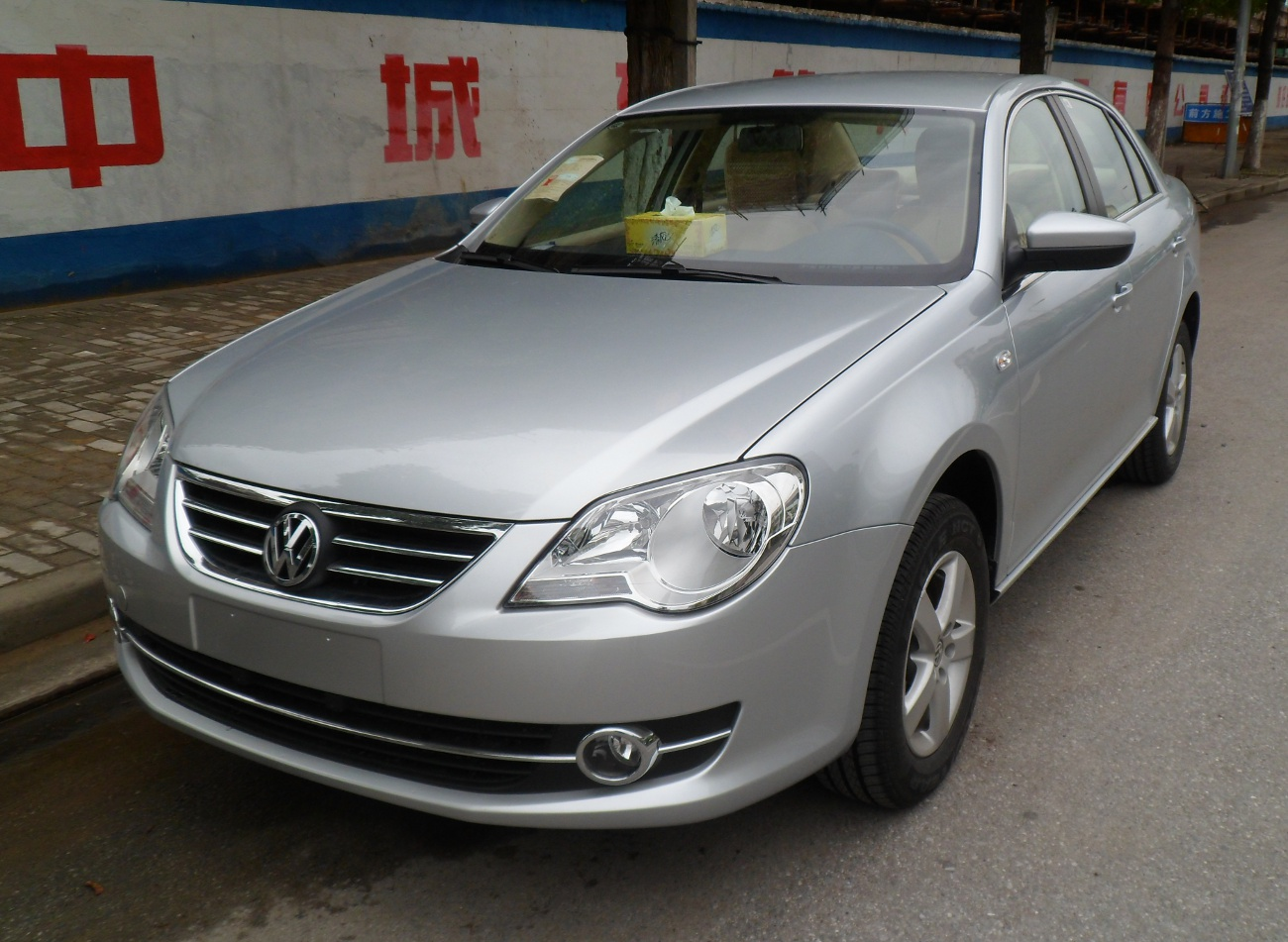
Volkswagen Bora (MK2)

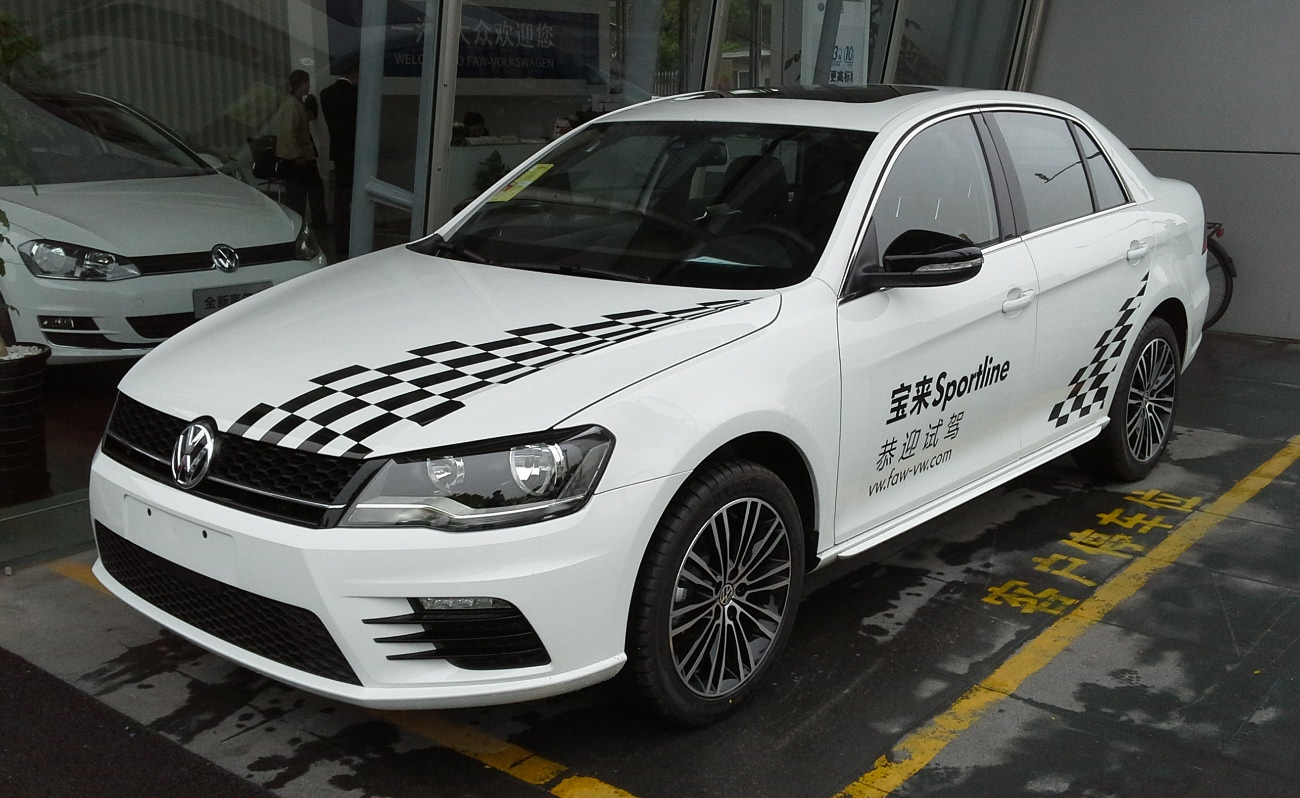
Volkswagen Bora (MK2) facelift

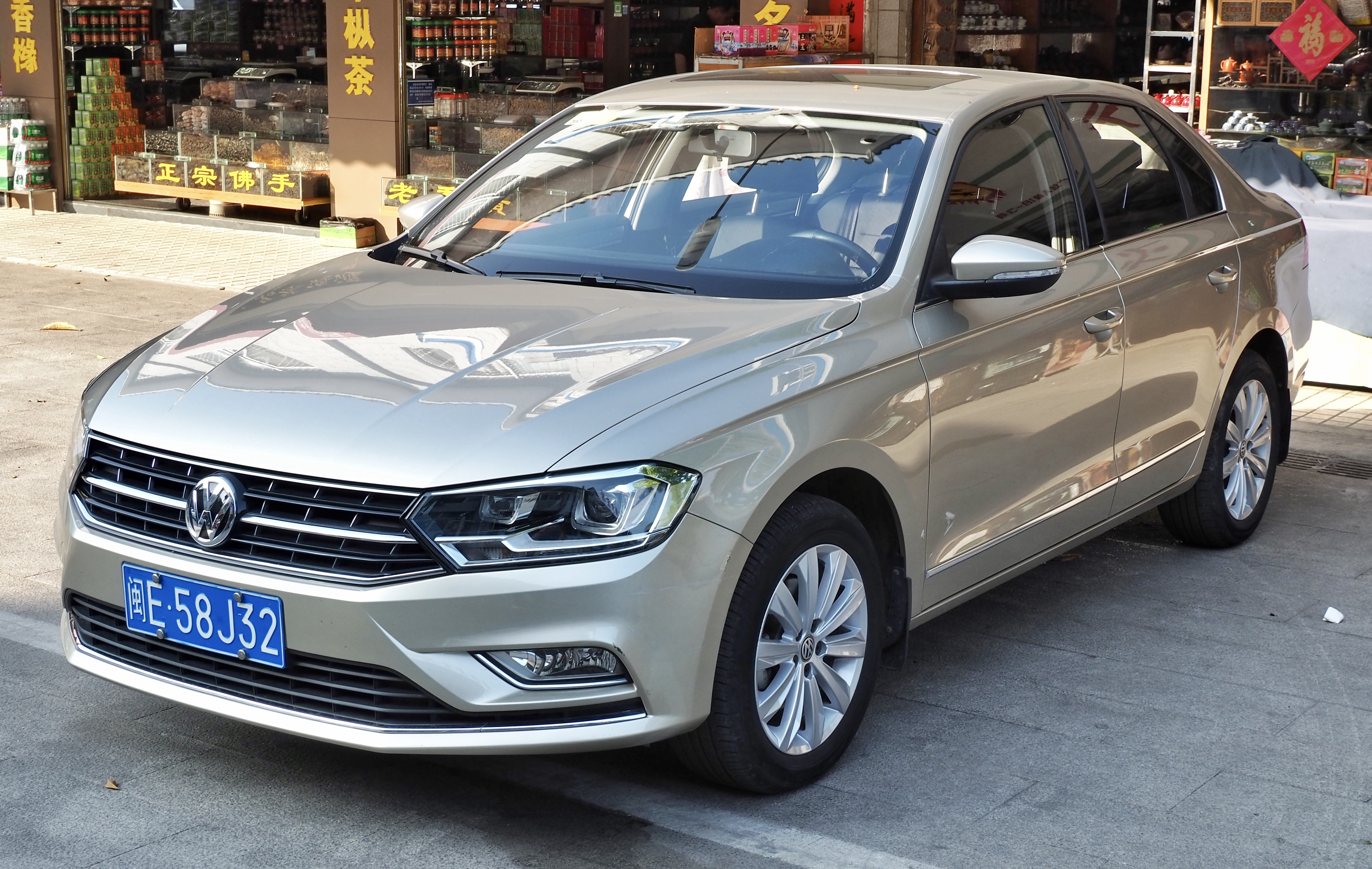
Volkswagen Bora (MK3)

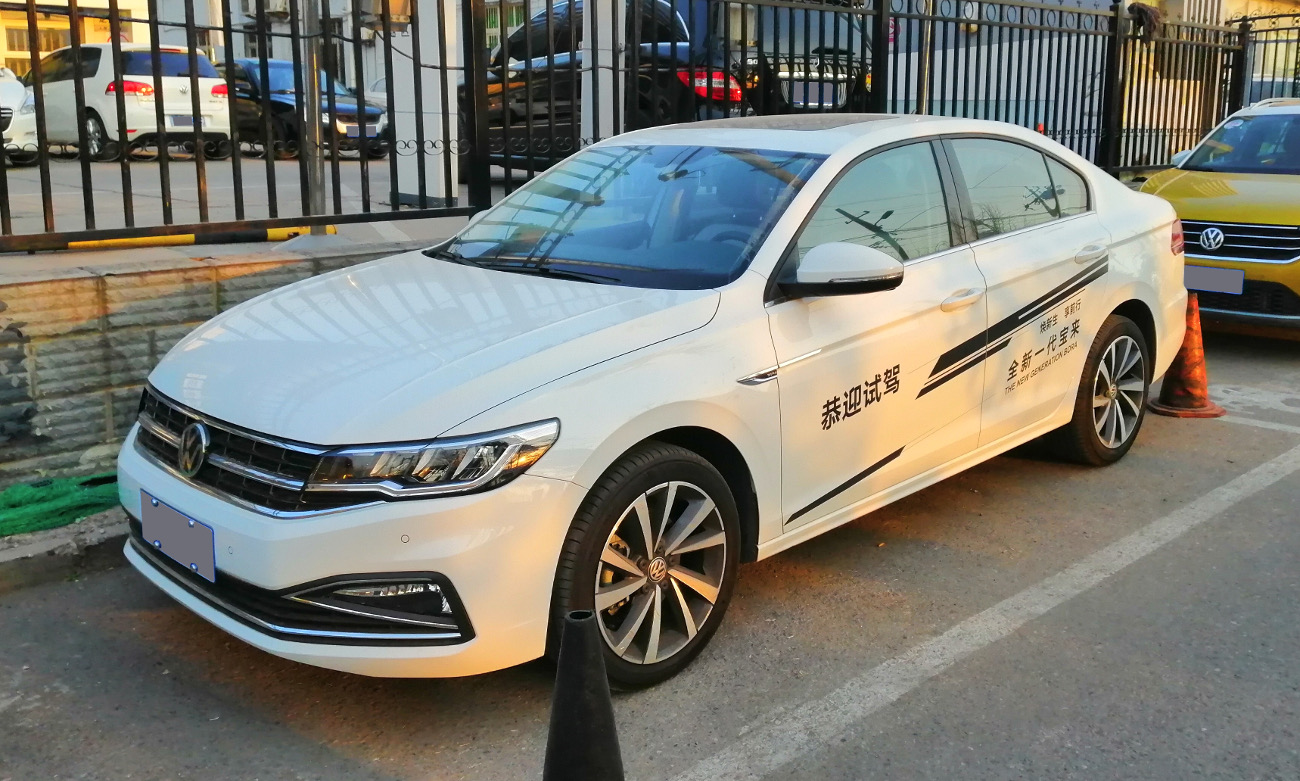
Volkswagen Bora (MK4)

=== Sagitar (2006–present) ===
The third known Jetta in China is known as the Sagitar, and has been produced since April 2006. The Sagitar name was used for the fifth, sixth, and seventh generation Jetta in China, as FAW-Volkswagen already used the Jetta name on one of its models.

For the Mk1 Sagitar, a 1.6-litre engine was standard alongside a 1.8-litre turbo and two-litre engine. The two-litre was removed in 2009 to make way for a 1.4-litre turbocharged engine. Available gearboxes were a five-speed manual, six-speed automatic, and seven-speed dual-clutch automatic transmission.

The Mk2 Sagitar entered the Chinese market in March 2012. The Sagitar was available with the 1.4-litre turbo and 1.6-litre engine paired with a five-speed manual gearbox for both engines, a six-speed automatic gearbox for 1.6 models, and a seven-speed dual-clutch automatic for 1.4 models. 1.8 TSI models were available for 2014 followed by the 2.0 litre TSI for 2016 and 1.2 TSI for 2017 and 2018. The 2.0 litre TSI engine and 6-speed DSG combination are standard on Sagitar GLi models while the 1.4 litre turbo with the 7-speed dual-clutch gearbox is available on Sagitar R-Line models. The Mk2 Sagitar ended production in September 2019.

Its successor, the Mk3 Sagitar was launched in January 2019. A 1.4 and 1.5 litre EA211 engine was standard paired to a 5 speed manual and 6-speed automatic gearbox.

According to Carsalesbase.com, the Sagitar has had 2.8 million units sold in China as of 2019.

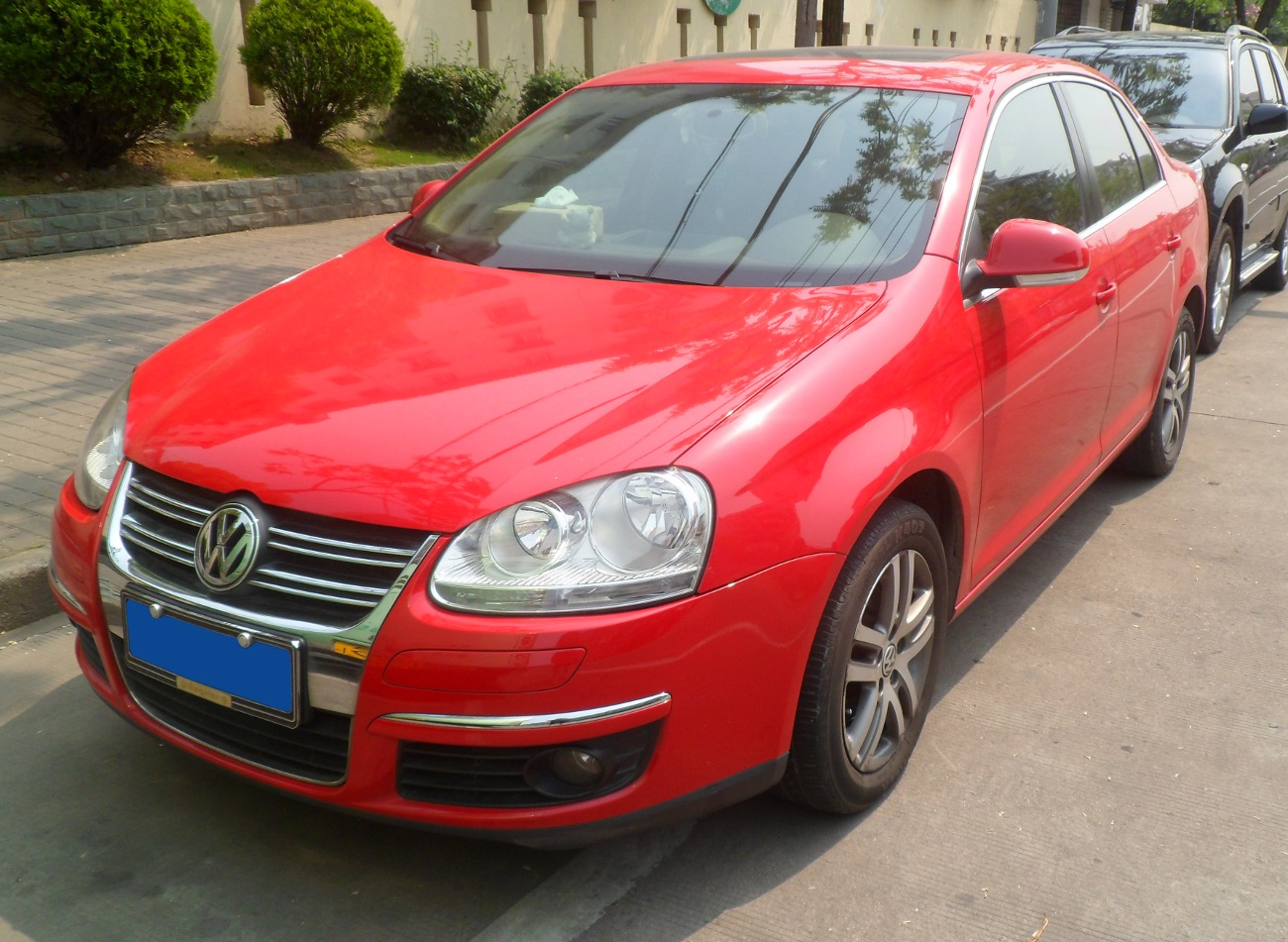
Volkswagen Sagitar MK1

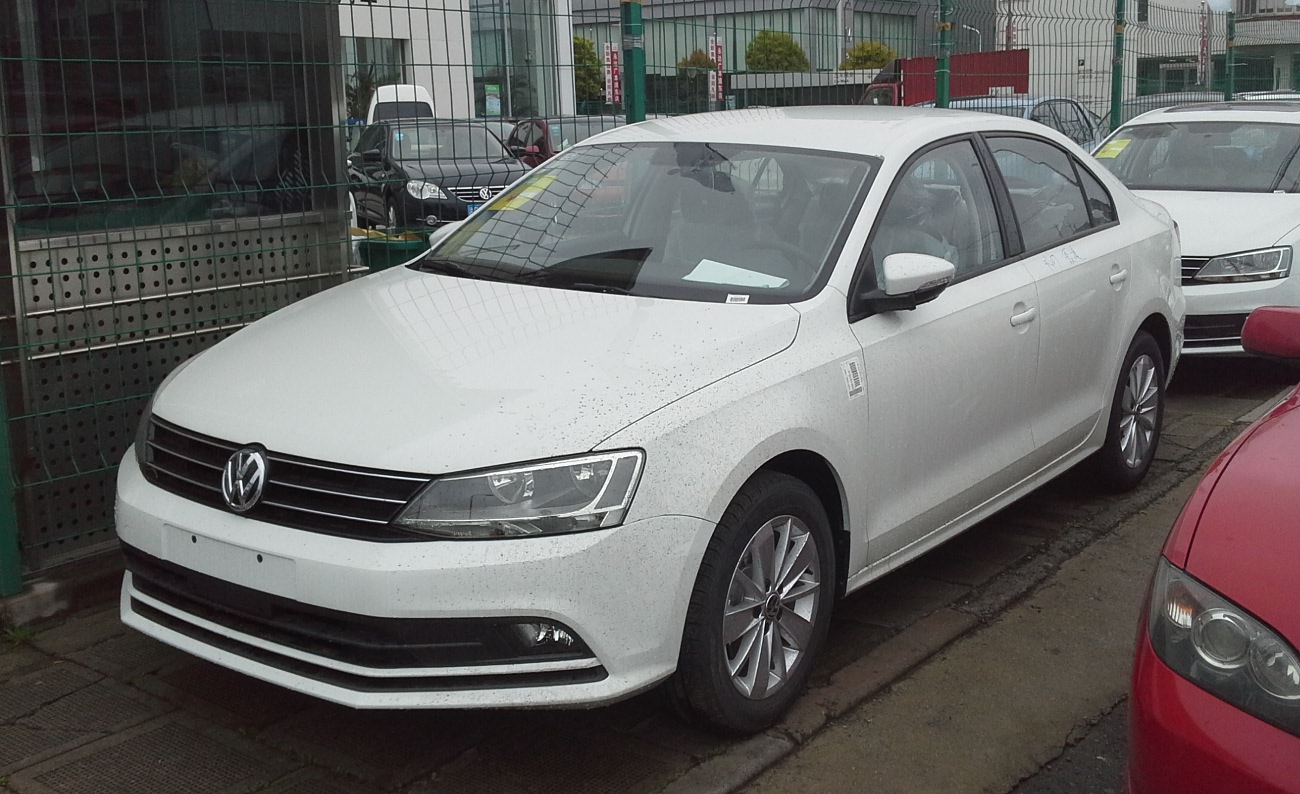
Volkswagen Sagitar MK2

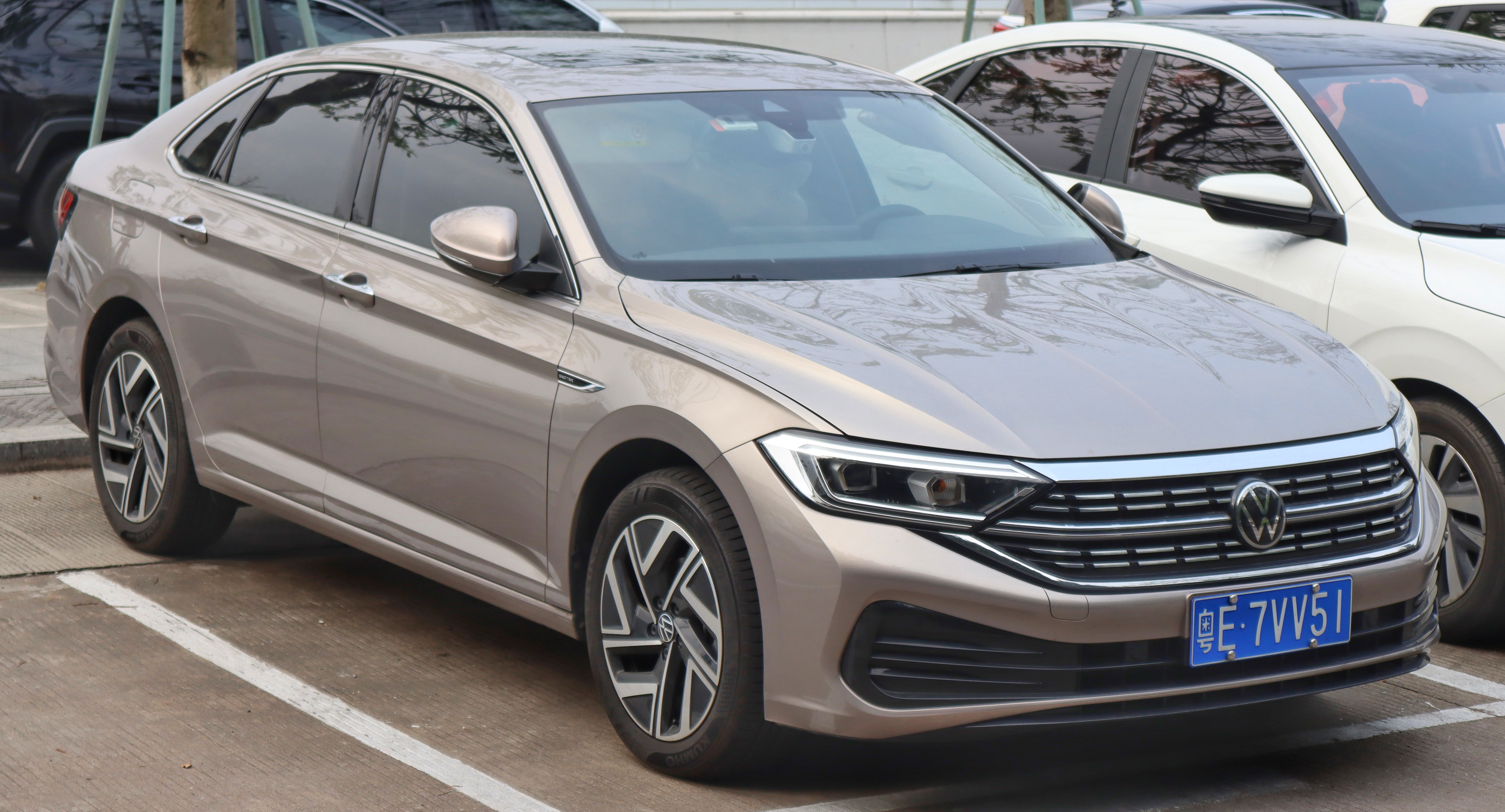
Volkswagen Sagitar MK3

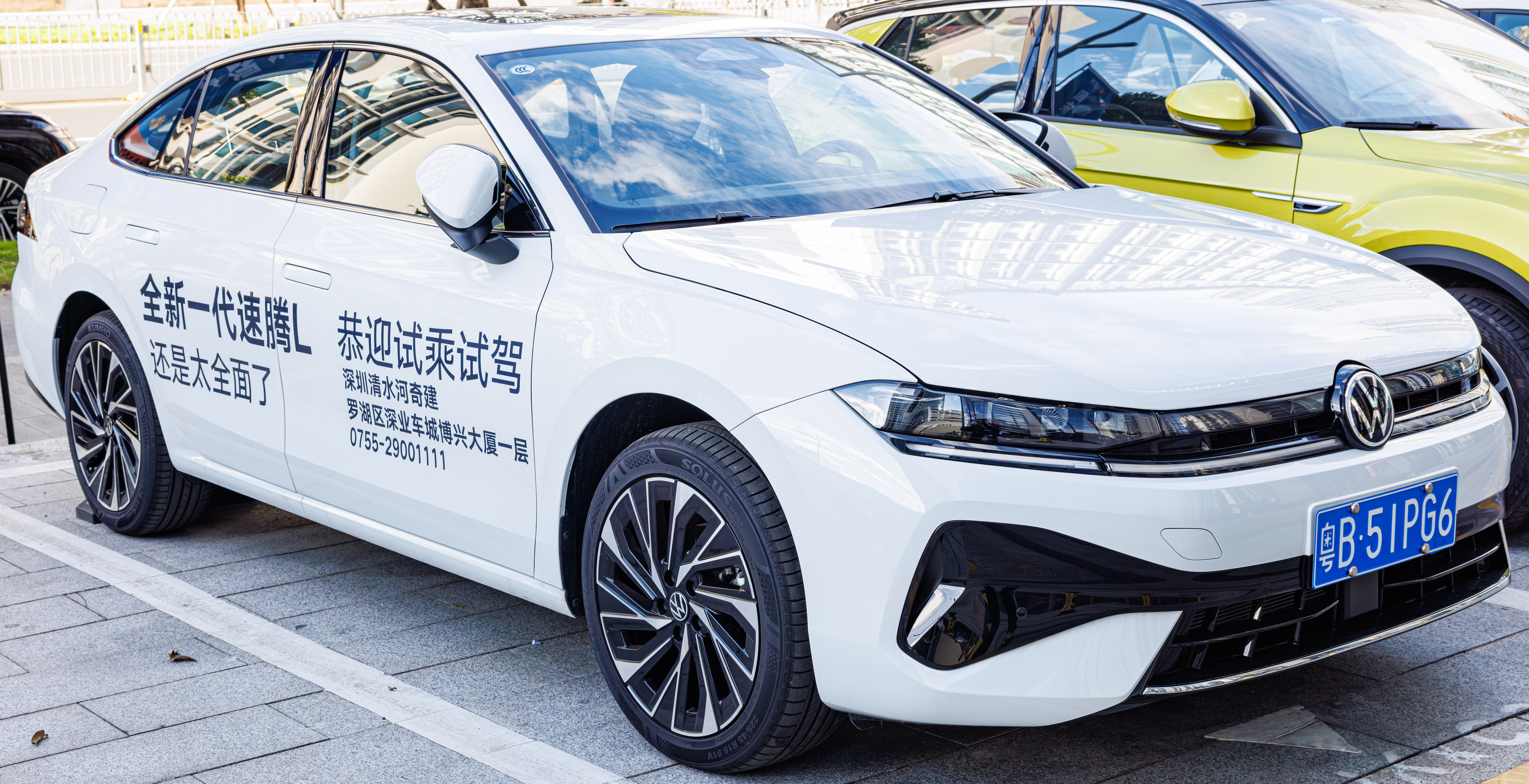
Volkswagen Sagitar L

=== New Jetta/Jetta VA3 (2013–present) ===
The Volkswagen New Jetta was introduced in March 2013, replacing the Chinese-built A2 model, and is a China-built exclusive. The New Jetta was paired with two new Volkswagen engines under the codename EA211, with displacements of 1.4 and 1.6 litres, respectively. The EA211 firstly made its debut in the fifth-generation Volkswagen Santana in 2012. For horsepower ratings, the 1.4-litre unit produced 66 kilowatts (88 horsepower), while the latter produced 81 kilowatts (108 horsepower). Transmission options consist of a five-speed manual or a six-speed automatic. Trim levels were known as Avantgarde ("时尚"), Comfortline ("舒适"), and Luxury ("豪华"), and pricing in 2013 ranged between 82,800 yuan and 119,300 yuan ($12,820 to $18,470 US – February 2021 exchange rate).

The New Jetta was given a facelift in 2017, with a new front and rear design and a new 1.5-litre engine producing 82 kilowatts (110 horsepower). A seven-speed dual clutch gearbox comes standard for the 230TSI model. To differentiate this version with 2013 type, the selling name was branded as "New Jetta 2017" ("新捷达2017款" in Chinese). Production for the New Jetta ended in March 2020. According to Carsalesbase.com, the new Jetta model achieved 1.9 million units sold.

A new car marque was launched in China in February 2019, known as Jetta. One of the models, the Jetta VA3, is a facelifted and rebadged New Jetta. According to pictures found on Chinese car website Autohome, the Jetta VA3 was to be powered by two engines, a 1.4-litre turbo and the 1.5-litre naturally aspirated EA211 four-cylinder engine. The VA3 was officially listed in September 2019, and the 1.5-litre EA211 is available paired to a five-speed manual and six-speed automatic gearbox. Pricing ranges between 65,800 and 92,800 yuan, with four trim levels (10,185 and US$13,365 – February 2021 exchange rate). According to Carsalesbase.com, the Jetta VA3 model sold 12,384 cars in 2019 and 42,376 in 2020.

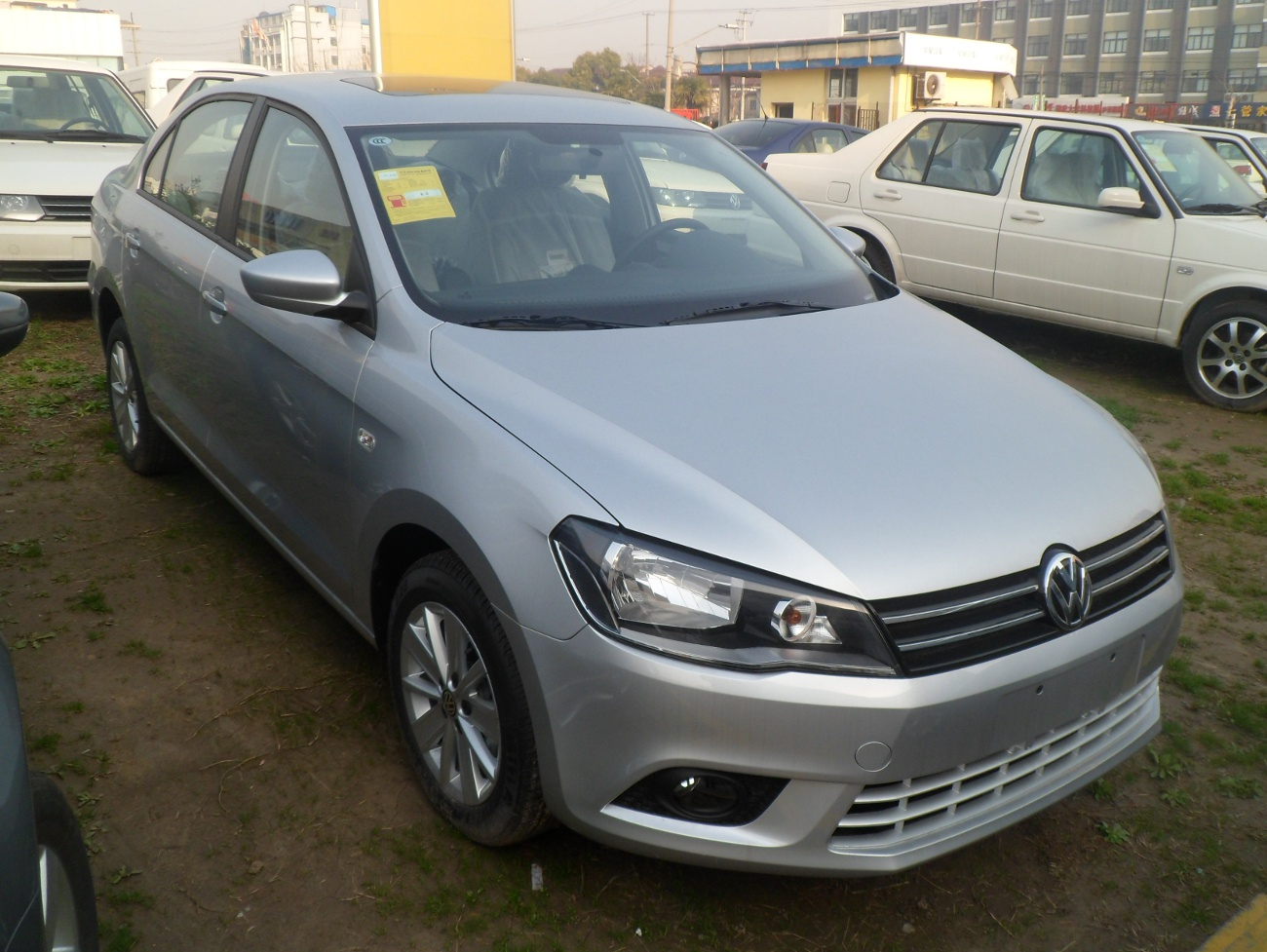
Jetta II (2013–2017) front

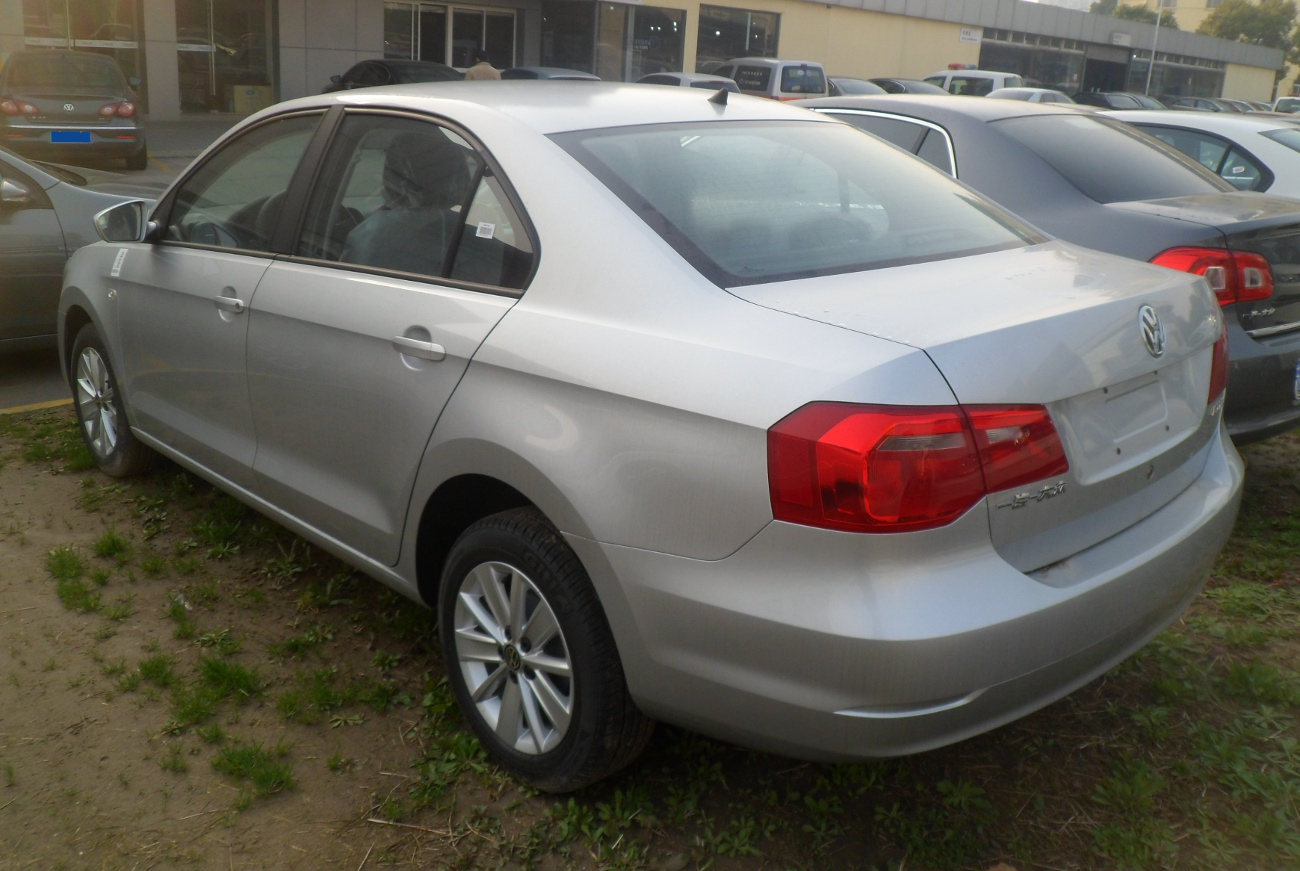
Jetta II (2013–2017) rear

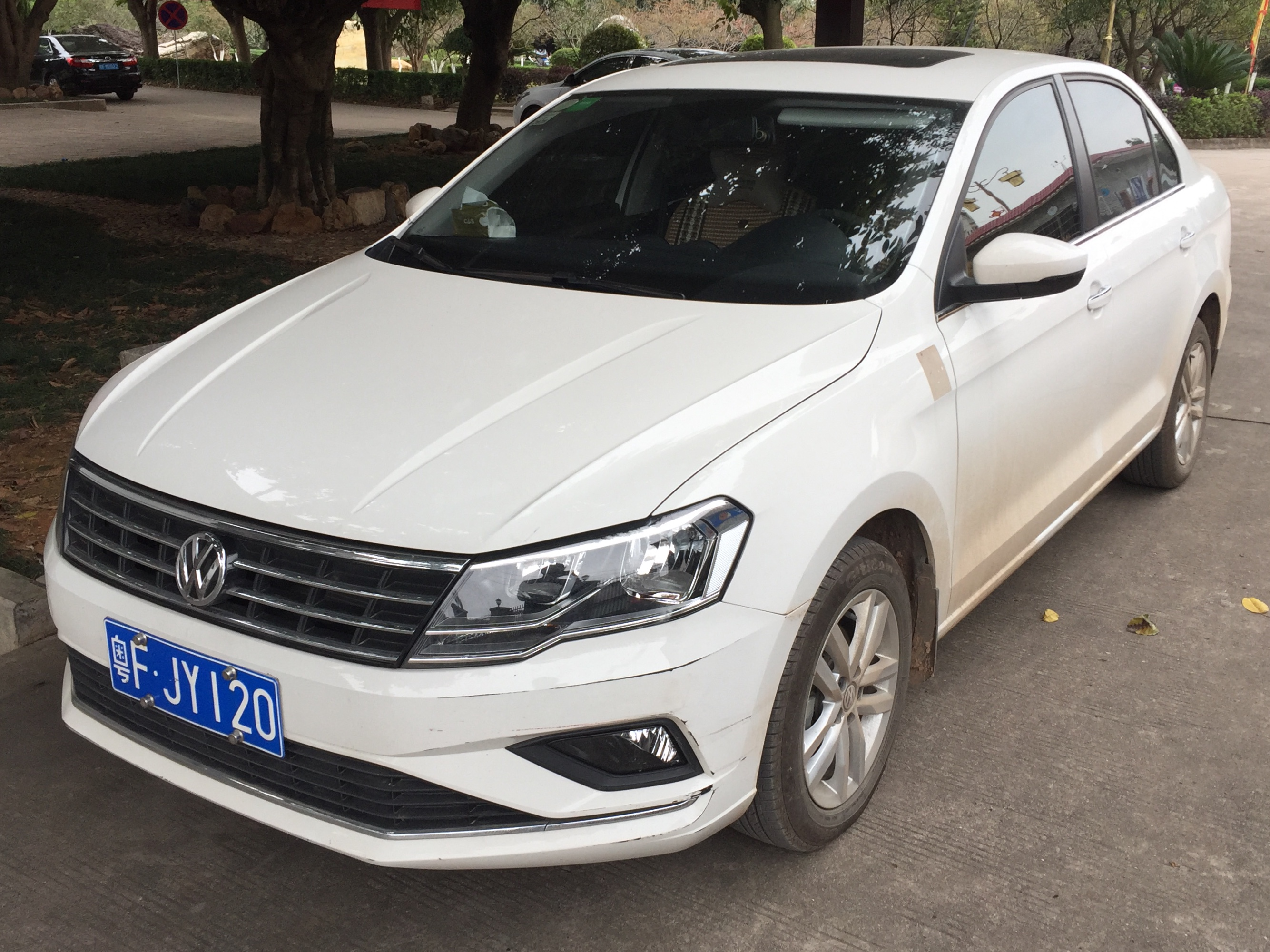
Volkswagen Jetta II facelift (2017–2020) front

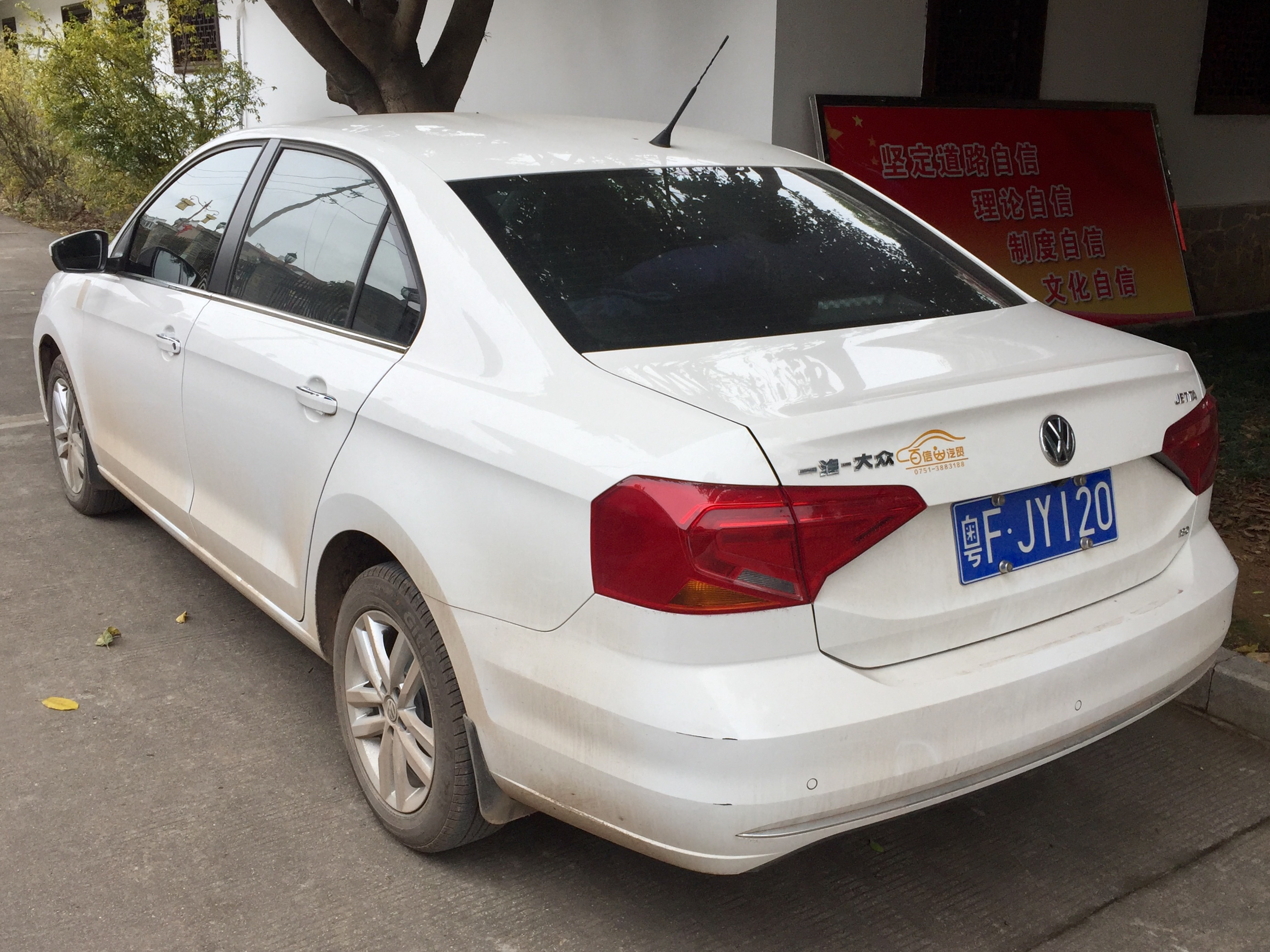
Jetta II (2017–2020) rear

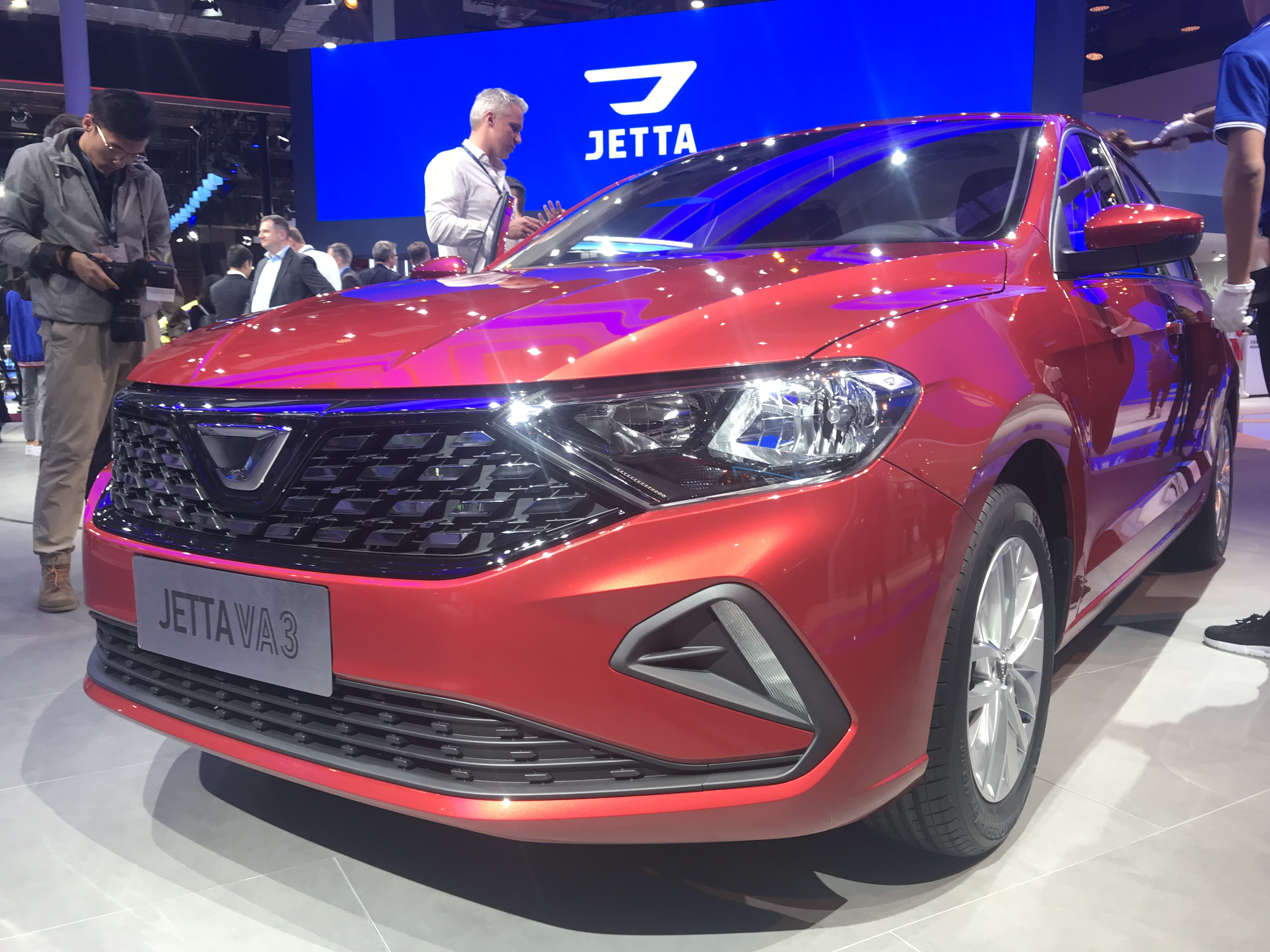
Jetta VA3 (2019–present) front

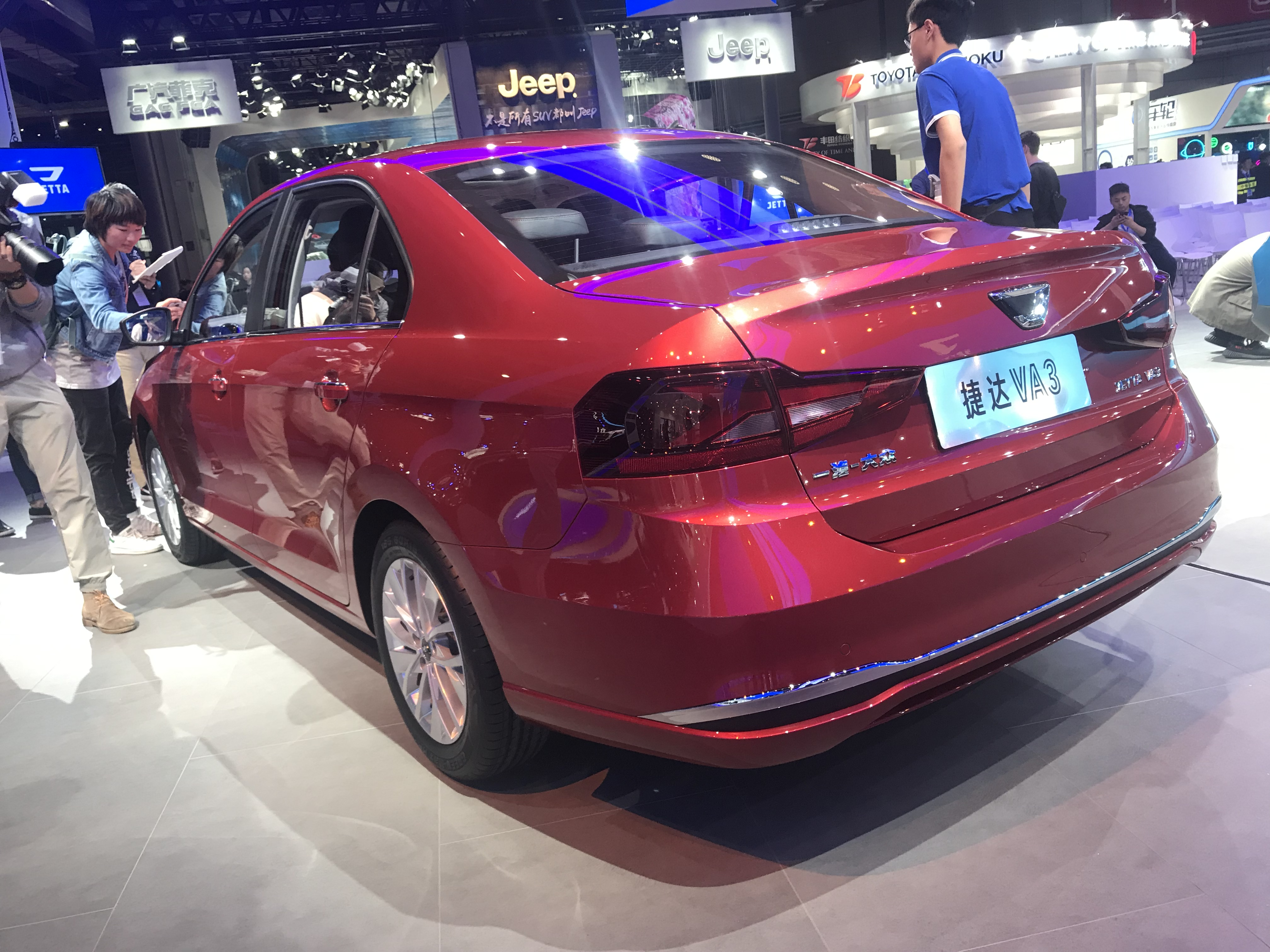
Jetta VA3 (2019–present) rear

== Sales ==
Year	U.S.	Canada	Mexico	Europe		Brazil		China		
Year	U.S.	Canada	Mexico	Bora	Jetta	Bora	Jetta	Jetta	Jetta VA3	Sagitar
1980	8,157									
1981	24,773									
1982	21,561									
1983	19,154									
1984	36,636									
1985	82,883									
1986	92,875									
1987	67,284									
1988	61,058									
1989	55,145									
1990	57,935									
1991	37,751		23,736							
1992	29,907									
1993	14,583									
1994	55,688		38,716							
1995	75,393		8,117							
1996	85,022		14,031							
1997	90,984		23,054					43,869		
1998	89,311		33,378					60,085		
1999	130,054			97,805				75,566		
2000	144,853			91,609				94,147		
2001	145,221		42,457	73,228				94,437		
2002	145,604		40,483	64,260				106,210		
2003	117,867		46,945	44,155		111		143,134		
2004	91,790	15,826	57,149	34,217	23	209		153,916		
2005	104,063	18,202	37,817	17,239	13,868	157	1	152,487		
2006	103,331	19,251	40,690		48,829	2,641	747	183,821		35,159
2007	98,951	14,665	44,395		40,403	2,432	5,012	200,530		65,028
2008	97,461	13,915	41,783		25,186	4,595	5,843	202,303		75,456
2009	108,427	13,970	32,585		22,976	4,491	5,794	224,857		98,712
2010	123,213	14,758	51,743		19,466	1,971	3,316	224,523		112,887
2011	177,360	26,749	83,047		37,121	298	15,997	218,864		127,555
2012	170,424	26,904	75,833		19,169		21,839	242,528		196,293
2013	163,793	30,413	91,096		14,693		14,483	263,408		271,188
2014	160,873	31,042	64,381		9,675		10,600	296,961		300,082
2015	131,109	27,719	55,932		10,414		9,241	274,932		279,887
2016	121,107	20,954	60,561		8,947		8,655	348,437		341,331
2017	115,807	17,483	45,246		6,906		7,670	317,637		327,062
2018	90,805	15,129	34,900		4,190		4,404	327,685		309,902
2019	100,453	17,260	27,873		84		11,252	105,163	12,384	307,323
2020	82,662	10,552	20,711		19		5,796	10	42,376	299,839
2021	61,967	12,585	8,773				2,927		54,763	235,607
2022	38,260	5,745	8,836				548		45,780	227,556
2023	47,407	8,153	16,344				2,230			285,051
2024	71,829	11,769	19,306				2,814			241,127
2025	54,291	15,849	20,820							

== See also ==
- Volkswagen Jetta (China)
- List of modern production plug-in electric vehicles
