= VW Electronics Research Laboratory =

Division of the Volkswagen Group of America, Inc.

Volkswagen Electronics Research Laboratory ("VWERL")
- Type: Private company, subsidiary of Volkswagen Group of America, Inc.
- Industry: Automotive electronics
- Founded: Sunnyvale, California, United States (August 1998)
- Headquarters: Belmont, California, U.S.
- Area served: Worldwide, with North American emphasis
- Key people: Nikolai Reimer, Director
- Services: Research and development
- Parent: Volkswagen Group
- Website: VWERL.com

The Volkswagen Electronics Research Laboratory (VWERL) is a division of the Volkswagen Group of America, Inc., with its headquarters in Silicon Valley (Belmont, California).

The VWERL's slogan Technology to the People! indicates its mission: to leverage Silicon Valley resources for the advancement of the Volkswagen Groups' products through technical knowledge and electronics expertise.

The VWERL has recently received media attention surrounding its joint victory with Stanford University in the DARPA Grand Challenge, a prize competition for driverless cars.

== History ==
The VWERL was founded in August 1998 and began operations in October 1998 with three employees. By December 2002, the lab had outgrown its Sunnyvale, California, office and moved to Palo Alto. In 2011, it relocated again to Belmont. The Belmont facility provides office, workshop, and prototyping spaces for about 60 workers. It also supports VWERL employees at Volkswagen Group of America's offices in Auburn Hills, Michigan, and its headquarters in Herndon, Virginia.

== Affiliation ==
The VWERL supports all brands within the Volkswagen Group, including Volkswagen Passenger Cars, Škoda, Bentley,Bugatti, Audi, SEAT, and Lamborghini. In addition to working with research and development teams in Germany, the VWERL also supports the development of U.S.-specific features for the Volkswagen Group of America.

== Research "teams" at VWERL ==
The VWERL comprises four teams:

- Driver Information and Assistance (DIA) - Instrumentation, visualization systems
- Human Machine Interface (HMI) - Interface concepts for driver assistance, infotainment systems
- Connected Vehicle (CV) - Wireless infotainment, collaborative intelligence, distributed computing
- Test Concepts and Validations (TCV) - Testing procedures, specifications compliance

== Headquarters ==
The VWERL's headquarters are located at 500 Clipper Drive, Belmont CA.

== See also ==
- List of German cars
- Volkswagen Group
- Volkswagen Group of America
