= Volkswagen Group of America =

North American operational headquarters and subsidiary of Volkswagen Group

Volkswagen Group of America, Inc.
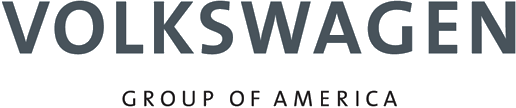
- Type: Subsidiary
- Industry: Automotive
- Founded: October 1955; 71 years ago in Englewood Cliffs, New Jersey, U.S.
- Headquarters: Reston, Virginia, U.S.
- Area served: North America
- Key people: Kjell Gruner (CEO)
- Products: Automobiles, auto part
- Brands: Volkswagen; Audi; Bentley; Lamborghini; Bugatti; Rimac
- Services: Automotive financial services
- Parent: Volkswagen Group
- Subsidiaries: Electrify America
- Website: volkswagengroupofamerica.com

Volkswagen Group of America, Inc. (also known as Volkswagen of America and abbreviated to VWoA) is the North American operational headquarters and subsidiary of the Volkswagen Group of automobile companies of Germany. It is responsible for six marques: Audi, Bentley, Lamborghini, and Volkswagen, and is the exclusive importer and distributor of Bugatti and Rimac cars in the United States. It also controls VW Credit, Inc. (operating as Volkswagen Financial Services), Volkswagen's financial services and credit operations. The company is headquartered in Reston, Virginia.

In Germany, the parent company Volkswagen AG is responsible for eight marques of the group, from six European countries: Volkswagen, Audi, Bentley, Bugatti, Lamborghini, Porsche, SEAT, Škoda and Volkswagen Commercial Vehicles.

As of March 2008, VWoA has 20 operational facilities spanning coast to coast. Its primary objective is "to offer attractive, safe and environmentally sound vehicles which are competitive on an increasingly tough market and which set world standards in their respective classes".

On July 16, 2008, Volkswagen AG announced plans to build its first production facility in the United States since the closure of its Westmoreland assembly plant in 1988. The Volkswagen Chattanooga Assembly Plant was inaugurated on May 24, 2011, and initially built the US-spec Volkswagen Passat before starting production of the Volkswagen Atlas in 2017.

On December 12, 2024, Kjell Gruner became chief executive officer of Volkswagen of America, taking the helm from Pablo Di Si, who stepped down on his own request.

== History ==
=== Foundation ===
Volkswagen of America was formed in October 1955 at 476 Hudson Terrace in Englewood Cliffs, New Jersey, to standardize Volkswagen's dealer service in the United States. Under the leadership of Dr. Carl Hahn, the organization expanded to 909 dealers nationwide by 1965. Under Hahn—and later his successor as president of Volkswagen of America, J. Stuart Perkins—Volkswagen's US sales climbed to an all-time peak of 569,696 vehicles in 1970, when the company captured roughly 7% of the US car market and supported more than a thousand American dealerships. The Volkswagen Beetle was by far the brand's best-selling model in the US. In the early 1970s, Volkswagen of America relocated from its original Hudson Terrace office to a newly constructed corporate office at 818 Sylvan Avenue, also in Englewood Cliffs.

From then on, however, intense competition from American and Japanese automakers caused VW sales in America to fall as much as 87 percent between 1970 and 1992, despite the introduction of new front-drive models in 1975 to replace the Beetle and its rear-engined, air-cooled stablemates. As a result, the number of VW dealerships in the US was also reduced to 630 by the mid-1990s. As of 2007, there were 596 operating Volkswagen dealerships in the country.

=== Westmoreland and Auburn Hills ===
VWoA inaugurated the Volkswagen Westmoreland Assembly Plant near New Stanton, Pennsylvania, in 1978. This was the first modern venture by a foreign automaker at making cars in the United States. In 1988, the plant was closed. In the early 1980s, the manufacturing division and the sales division were merged, and Volkswagen of America moved to Troy, Michigan, as a result, settling in Auburn Hills, Michigan, in 1991 (42°38′43.2″N 83°12′55.4″W).

=== 1990s uncertainties ===
Volkswagen of America's sales hit bottomed out in 1993, with fewer than 50,000 cars sold that year. Sales began to recover the following year with the introduction of the third generation of the Golf and Jetta. By the end of the decade, thanks to effective advertising and the launch of more competitive new products, including the New Beetle in 1997, the VW brand was back on firmer ground. Volkswagen of America went on to sell 355,648 cars in 2001, its best year since 1973.

=== 2000s ===
In the 2000s, sales tapered off somewhat due to competition, quality issues, and delays in product introductions. VW's US sales for 2005 totaled 224,195, a reduction of about 37 percent from four years earlier. New models for the 2006 and 2007 model years, such as the Passat, Rabbit, and GTI, resulted in a sales growth of 4.9% for 2006, with sales of 235,140 vehicles. Profitability still remained an issue, as Volkswagen of America had not turned a profit for its parent company since 2002. In January 2007, Volkswagen of America president Adrian Hallmark publicly stated that he planned to get the subsidiary back to profitability in two to three years. He hoped to introduce new models for North America and develop new marketing to encompass the whole brand, as well as individual cars. Stefan Jacoby soon replaced him, and Volkswagen of America continued to look at new products to add to its lineup.

In the meantime, advertising agency Crispin Porter + Bogusky helped rejuvenate VW's presence in the US as well. Its ads for the fifth-generation GTI sparked interest in the brand that had not been seen since the launch of the New Beetle, and ads for the fifth-generation Golf/Rabbit hatchback translated into initial strong sales for that model. Due to new air pollution rules promulgated by the Environmental Protection Agency (EPA), the diesel powered VWs with TDI-PD technology could no longer be produced after December 31, 2006. For the 2009 model year, VW introduced a new generation of diesels, based on common rail technology. These would meet air pollution standards in all 50 states. The first of these units was made available for sale in August 2008. VW sold 2,050 Jetta Sedan TDIs and 361 Jetta Sportwagen TDIs that first month. However, the company was later charged with three felonies and fined $25 billion for defrauding the US government when it was discovered that their vehicles were only passing laboratory emissions testing due to company tampering of their system's internal software.

In October 2009, Deutsch LA, the ad agency of renowned ad man Donny Deutsch, won Volkswagen's American advertising account, fourteen years after Deutsch had tried for VW's advertising business against Arnold Advertising.

=== New headquarters in Virginia ===
On September 6, 2007, Volkswagen of America announced that it would relocate its North American headquarters to Herndon, Virginia. Volkswagen sales were particularly strong in the Mid-Atlantic region, as well as both coasts. The company indicated that it was important for them to locate in a region where their customer base is strongest. Presently, the Big Three domestic brands dominate the Midwestern United States, especially Detroit, where the company was formerly located.

Volkswagen of America began its move from Auburn Hills to Herndon in April 2008. The company anticipated that 600 of the 1,400 staff would remain at Auburn Hills in the call center and technical services positions, while 400 jobs would transferred to Virginia. Volkswagen of America President and CEO Stefan Jacoby said that about 150 employees in Michigan were expected to move to Herndon; the 400 remaining jobs were to be cut.

The state of Virginia, which was among 14 locations that Volkswagen of America considered for the move, offered Volkswagen $6 million in incentives that will be awarded pending Volkswagen's fulfillment of employment and other various quotas.

Volkswagen moved its North American headquarters from Herndon to Reston, Virginia in 2023.

=== New manufacturing plant ===
On July 15, 2008, after an intense, months-long battle between Huntsville, Alabama, a site in Michigan and Chattanooga, Tennessee, the company's supervisory board chose Chattanooga as the location for the new plant. This $1 billion investment was expected to result in production of about 150,000 cars a year by its slated opening in 2011, playing a major role in the company's strategy to gain more than 6% of the car market, or about 800,000 cars on top of the 230,000 it produced in the US in 2007, by 2018. This plant also became Volkswagen Group of America's manufacturing headquarters in the US. The plant was inaugurated on May 24, 2011.

== Current US facilities ==
As of March 2018, Volkswagen Group of America has the following 20 "operational facilities" across the US:

- Auburn Hills, Michigan – Customer Relations and After Sales Support Center, Information Technology & Services
- Reston, Virginia – Corporate Headquarters
- Hillsboro, Oregon – VW Credit, Inc. Center
- Belmont, California – Electronics Research Laboratory (ERL)
- Oxnard, California – Technical Center
- Ontario, California – Parts Distribution Center
- San Diego, California – Port/PPC
- Maricopa, Arizona – Proving Ground
- Golden, Colorado – VW Credit, Inc. and Technical Center
- Fort Worth, Texas – Parts Distribution Center
- Houston, Texas – Port/PPC and Parts Distribution Center
- Libertyville, Illinois – VW Credit, Inc. Center
- Pleasant Prairie, Wisconsin – Parts Distribution Center
- Jacksonville, Florida – Parts Distribution Center
- Brunswick, Georgia – Port/PPC
- Cranbury, New Jersey – Parts Distribution Center
- Allendale, New Jersey – Technical Center
- Englewood Cliffs, New Jersey – Product Liaison
- Davisville, Rhode Island – Port/PPC
- Chattanooga, Tennessee – Volkswagen Chattanooga Assembly Plant
- Lenoir City, Tennessee - Distribution center
- Woodcliff Lake, New Jersey – Northeast Region Office
- Rosemont, Illinois – Midwest Region Office
- Irving, Texas – South Central Region Office
- Alpharetta, Georgia – Southeast Region Office
- Westlake Village, California – Pacific Region Office

== Regional offices ==
- VW Canada Head Office - Ajax, Ontario
- Volkswagen Finance Canada - Saint-Laurent, Quebec

== Brands ==
=== Volkswagen ===
==== Current models ====
The following is a list of the models currently available in the American market:

Sedan
Jetta
SUV
Tiguan · Atlas · Atlas Cross Sport ·Taos · ID.4
Performance
Golf GTI · Golf R
Minivans
ID. Buzz

==== Sales ====
The total number of new vehicle sales year-by-year in the U.S. market is as follows:

Calendar Year	Total American sales
1970	569,696
1997	137,885
1998	219,679
1999	315,563
2000	355,479
2001	355,648
2002	338,125
2003	302,686
2004	256,111
2005	224,195
2006	235,140
2007	230,572
2008	223,128
2009	213,454
2010	256,830
2011	324,402
2012	438,133
2013	407,704
2014	366,970
2015	349,440
2016	322,948
2017	339,676
2018	354,064
2019	363,322
2020	325,784
2021	375,030
2022	301,069
2023	329,029

=== Audi ===
==== Current Audi models ====
The following is a list of the Audi/Audi Sport models currently available in the American market:

Audi AG		Audi Sport
A/Q-models	S-models	RS-models
A3 Sedan	S3 Sedan	RS 3 Sedan
Q3 SUV	–	–
Q4 e-tron SUV & Sportback	–	–
A5 Sedan	S5 Sedan	–
Q5 SUV & Sportback	SQ5 SUV & Sportback	–
A6 Sedan & allroad	–	RS 6 Avant
A6 e-tron Sedan	S6 e-tron Sedan	–
Q6 e-tron SUV & Sportback	SQ6 e-tron SUV & Sportback	–
–	–	RS 7 Sportback
–	S e-tron GT	RS e-tron GT
Q7 SUV	SQ7 SUV	–
Q8 SUV	SQ8 SUV	RS Q8 SUV
A8 Sedan	S8 Sedan	–

==== Sales ====
Calendar Year	Total American sales
1995	18,124
1996	27,379
1997	34,160
1998	47,517
1999	65,959
2000	80,372
2001	83,283
2002	85,726
2003	86,421
2004	77,917
2005	83,066
2006	90,116
2007	93,506
2008	87,760
2009	82,716
2010	101,629
2011	117,570
2012	139,310
2013	158,061
2014	182,011
2015	202,202
2016	210,213
2017	226,511
2018	223,323

=== Bentley ===
==== Current models ====
The following is a list of the models currently available in the American market:

- Flying Spur
- Continental GT Coupe
- Continental GT Convertible
- Bentayga

=== Lamborghini ===
==== Current models ====
The following is a list of the models currently available in the American market:

- Urus

=== Bugatti ===
The only vehicle sold new under the Bugatti label is the Chiron.

== See also ==
- list of German cars
- Volkswagen Group
- Volkswagen Group China
- Volkswagen do Brasil
