= J. Stuart Perkins =

British-American businessman

J. Stuart Perkins (1928-2014) was a British-born businessman who served as president of the U.S. sales subsidiary of Volkswagen, Volkswagen of America, from 1965 to 1978. During his tenure as president of Volkswagen's American operations, sales of Volkswagen cars peaked in the United States, the model lineup was greatly expanded beyond the Volkswagen Beetle with new rear-engined, air-cooled cars, and Volkswagen offered its first front-wheel-drive vehicles. Perkins also presided over Volkswagen's sales peak in the United States; the brand sold a record 569,696 automobiles in 1970, 71.2 percent of those cars being Beetles. (Beetle sales, 405,615 in 1970, had peaked at 423,008 in 1968.)

Perkins was born in London in 1928, and was one of Volkswagen's first three U.S. employees when the American sales office was established in April 1955. He had previously worked in VW's subsidiary in Canada. In June 1965, Perkins was appointed vice president and general manager of the operation, and he became president that December, succeeding Dr. Carl Hahn.

He enjoyed great success in expanding Volkswagen's dealership network and increasing sales figures in America, and Volkswagen had a tremendous advantage in marketing the Beetle's front-wheel-drive replacement, the Rabbit (known as the Volkswagen Golf in Europe) when it was introduced in January 1975. By 1976, however, Perkins was at odds with the company's plans to build Rabbits in the United States when it seemed a questionable idea due to logistical problems. He was further agitated when the job of running Volkswagen's new Westmoreland Assembly Plant, was given to James McLernon, a manager from Chevrolet, whose cars were distinctly different from Volkswagen's.

Once the Volkswagen plant commenced production of the Volkswagen Rabbit, the North American version of the original Volkswagen Golf, Perkins was no longer president Volkswagen of America but only the president of the sales and marketing department, which remained at Volkswagen's original American offices Englewood Cliffs, New Jersey. He instead reported to McLernon, who assumed leadership of all of Volkswagen of America as well as the manufacturing end of the business. Perkins left the company shortly thereafter, and McLernon closed the Englewood Cliffs office and consolidated Volkswagen's American business in Troy, Michigan, which was his base of operation.

Perkins remained on the VW board of directors for about three years after he retired, and he eventually moved to Sarasota, Florida, where he died on December 25, 2014.

== Sources ==
Flammang, James M., Volkswagen: Beetles, Buses and Beyond, Krause Publications, Iola, Wis., 1996

Kiley, David, "Getting The Bugs Out: The Rise, Fall and Comeback of Volkswagen in America", Adweek, 2002
