= Volkswagen Bora (disambiguation) =

Volkswagen Bora is a name used by the German company Volkswagen on several different models of cars:

- Volkswagen Bora, the Jetta MK4 was rebadged as the Volkswagen Bora outside of North America.
- Volkswagen Bora, the Jetta MK5 was rebadged as the Volkswagen Bora in Mexico and Colombia.
- Volkswagen Bora (China), an independent model line originated from the Jetta MK4-based Bora produced by FAW-VW in China.
- Volkswagen Bora, the Sagitar L, was rebadged as Volkswagen Bora in Kazakhstan.
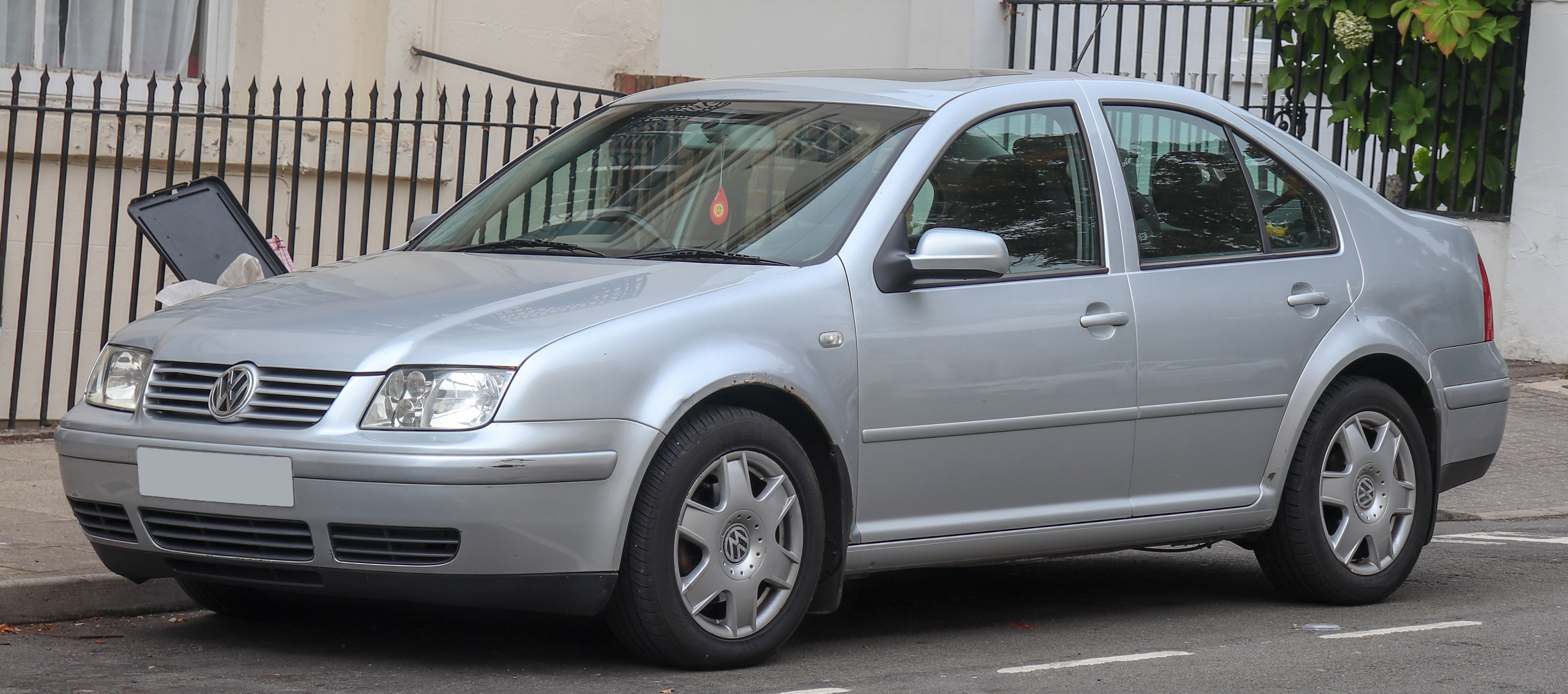
Volkswagen Bora (1999–2005)

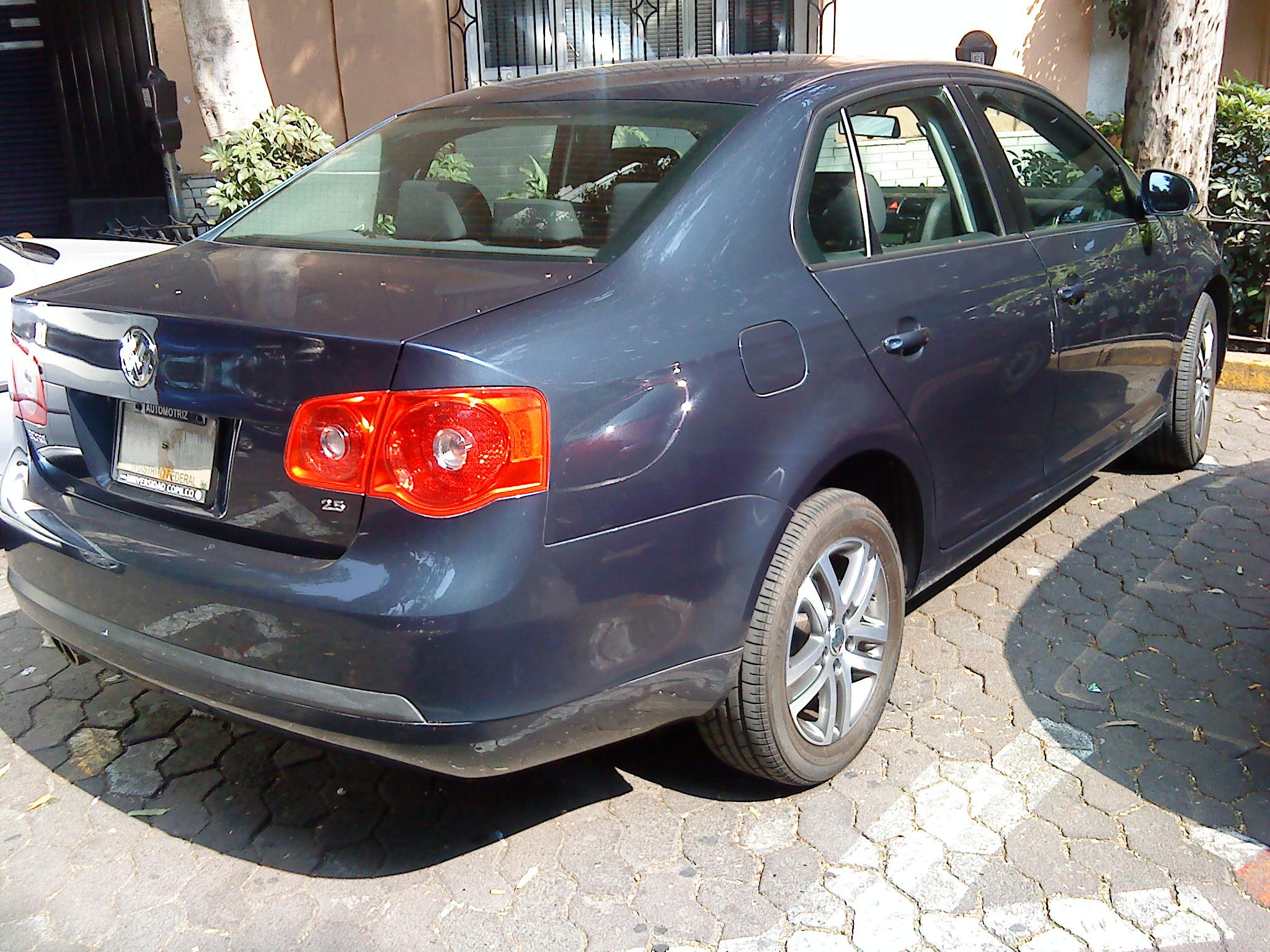
Volkswagen Jetta (A5) (2006-2010)

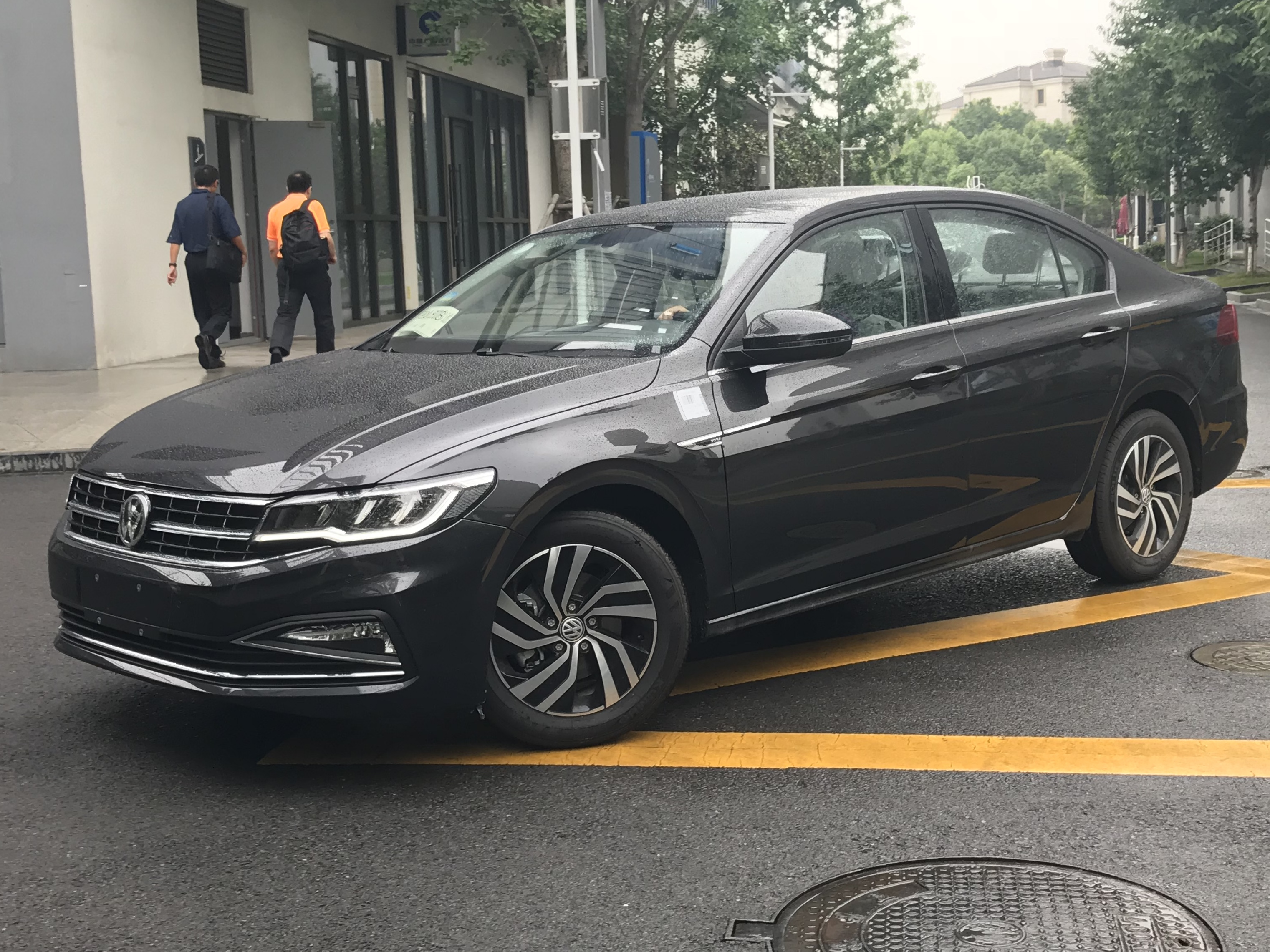
Volkswagen Bora (China) (2001–present)
