= Volkswagen Bora (China) =

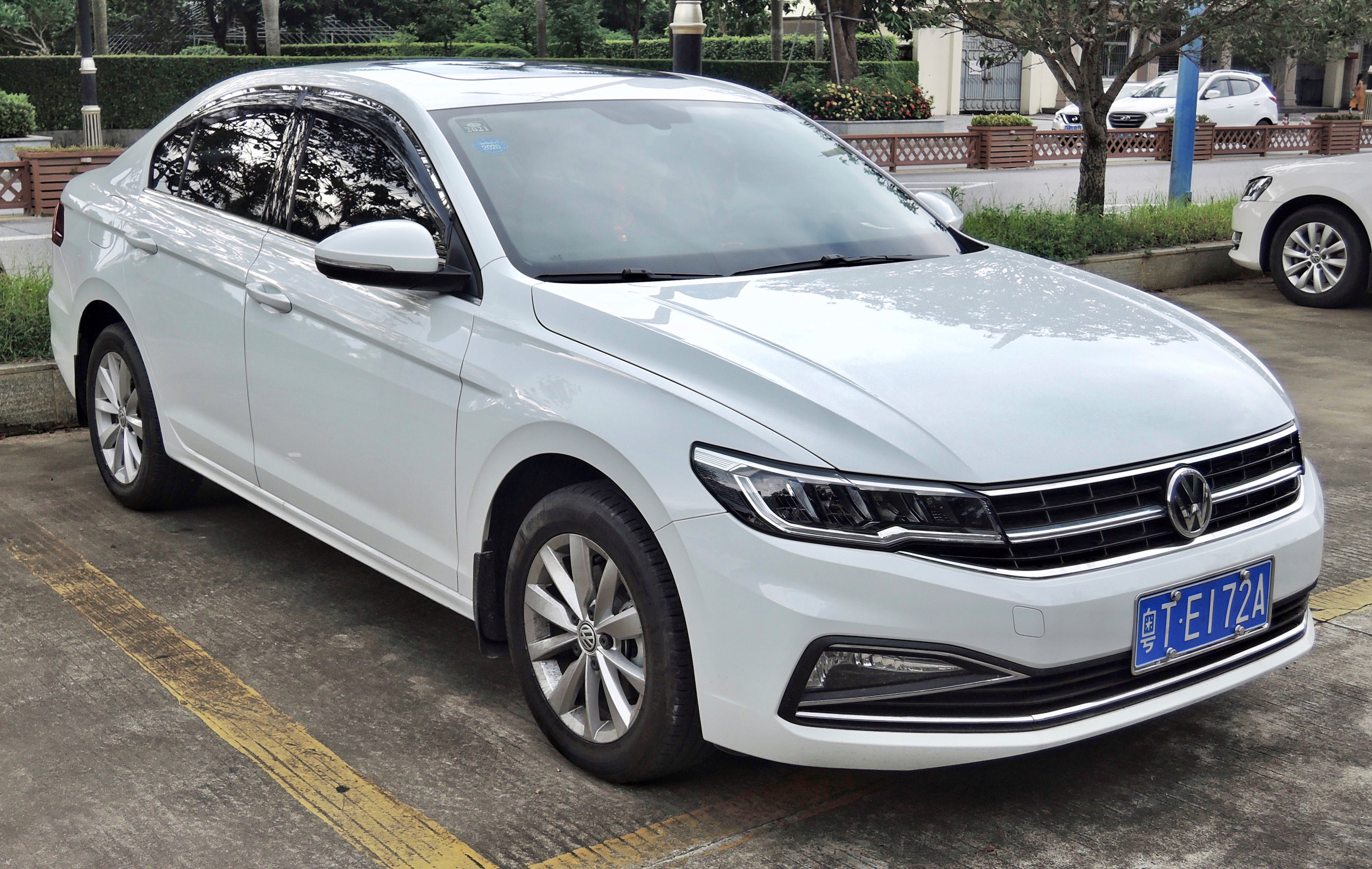

Overview
- Manufacturer: Volkswagen
- Production: 2001–2026

Body and chassis
- Class: Compact car (C)
- Layout: Front-engine, front-wheel-drive

Chronology
- Predecessor: Volkswagen Citi Golf
- Successor: Volkswagen Sagitar S

The Volkswagen Bora (Chinese: 大众宝来; pinyin: Dàzhòng Bǎolái) for the Chinese market is a compact car manufactured and marketed by FAW-Volkswagen since 2001. Originally started as the fourth generation Volkswagen Jetta in North America and the Volkswagen Bora in other parts of the world, it went through a few heavy facelifts, and production carried on with new updates long after the international Volkswagen Bora was out of production.

== First generation (1J; 2001) ==
First generation
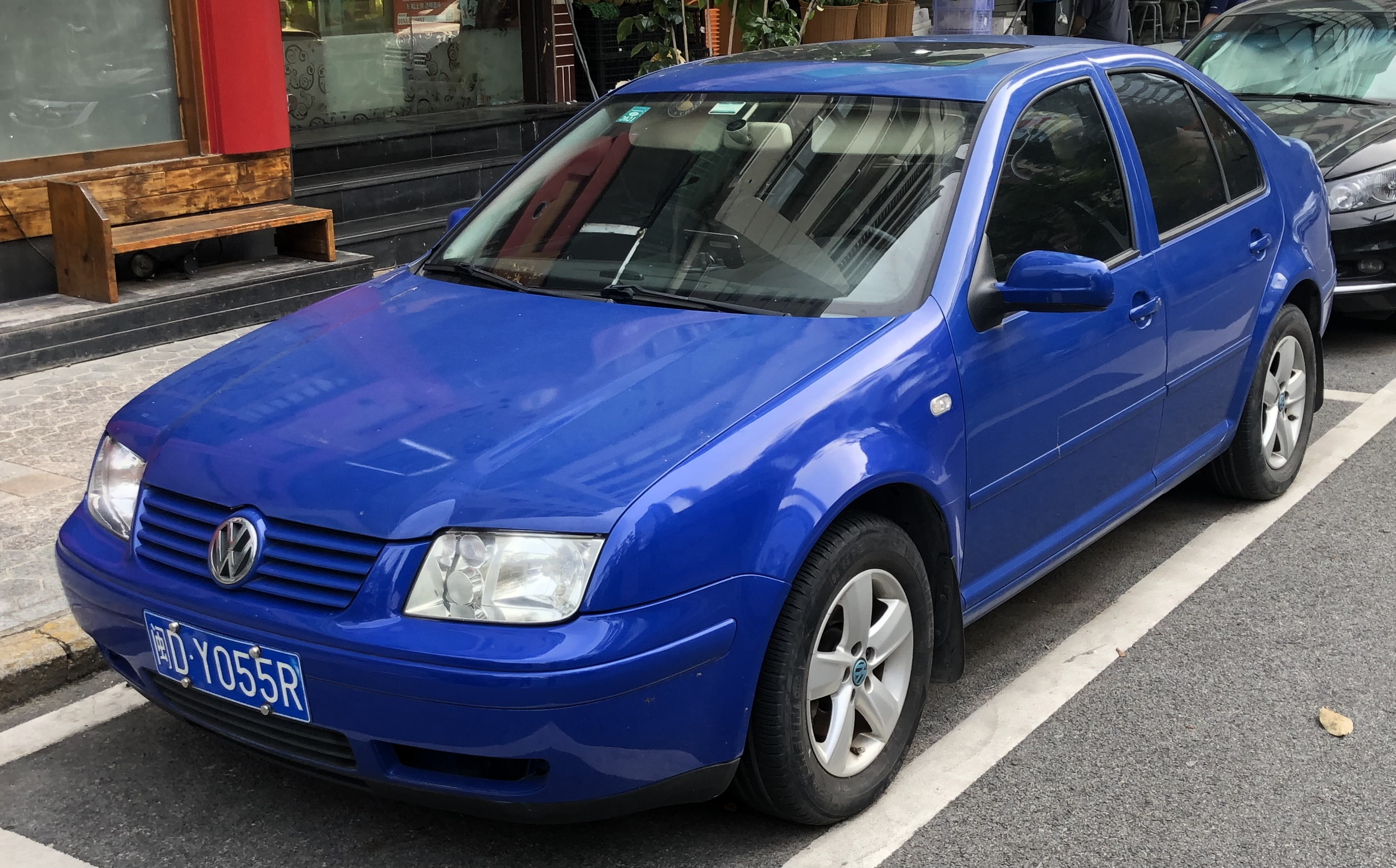

Overview
- Also called: Volkswagen Jetta; Volkswagen City Jetta (Canada); Volkswagen Clásico (Mexico); Volkswagen Bora Classic (2006–2008)
- Production: 2001–2008
- Assembly: China: Changchun (FAW-VW)

Body and chassis
- Body style: 4-door notchback sedan / saloon 5-door hatchback
- Layout: Front-engine, front-wheel-drive or four-wheel-drive
- Platform: Volkswagen Group A4 (PQ34) platform
- Related: Volkswagen Golf Mk4; Audi A3 Mk1; SEAT León Mk1; SEAT Toledo Mk2; Škoda Octavia Mk1

Powertrain
- Engine: Petrol: 1.6 L EA113 I4 (petrol); 1.8 L EA113 I4; 1.8 L EA113 turbo I4; Diesel: 1.9 L TDI I4
- Transmission: 5-speed 02J manual 4-speed 01M automatic

Dimensions
- Wheelbase: 2,511 mm (98.9 in); 2,513 mm (98.9 in)
- Length: 4,376 mm (172.3 in) (2001–05); 4,383 mm (172.6 in) (2006); 4,178 mm (164.5 in) (Bora HS)
- Width: 1,735 mm (68.3 in); 1,742 mm (68.6 in) (Bora HS)
- Height: 1,446 mm (56.9 in); 1,444 mm (56.9 in) (Bora HS)

The original Volkswagen Bora started out as a rebadged MK4 Jetta. There is also a heavily modified Jetta called the Volkswagen Lavida for the Chinese market, developed by Shanghai Volkswagen on the same platform.

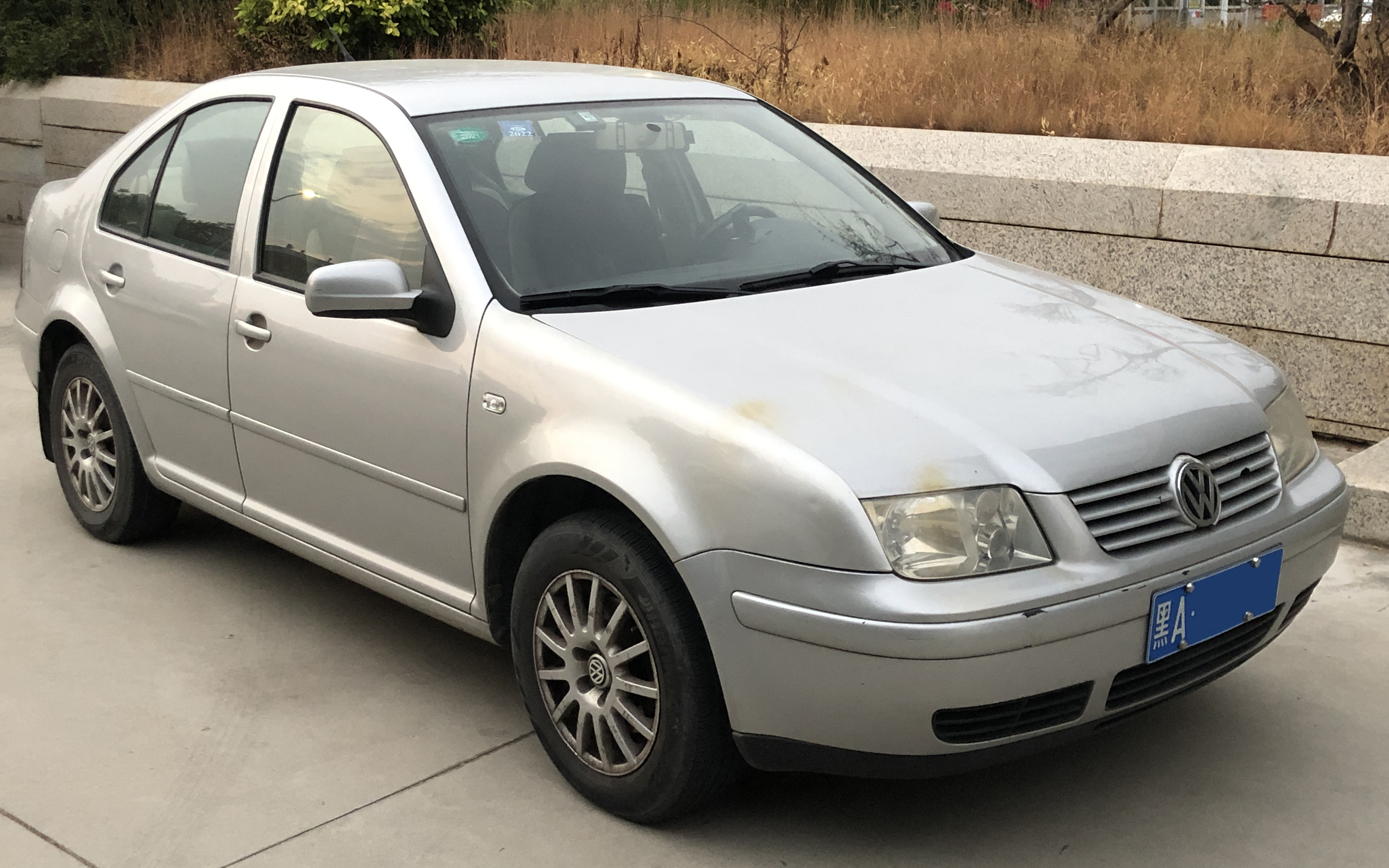
Volkswagen Bora I

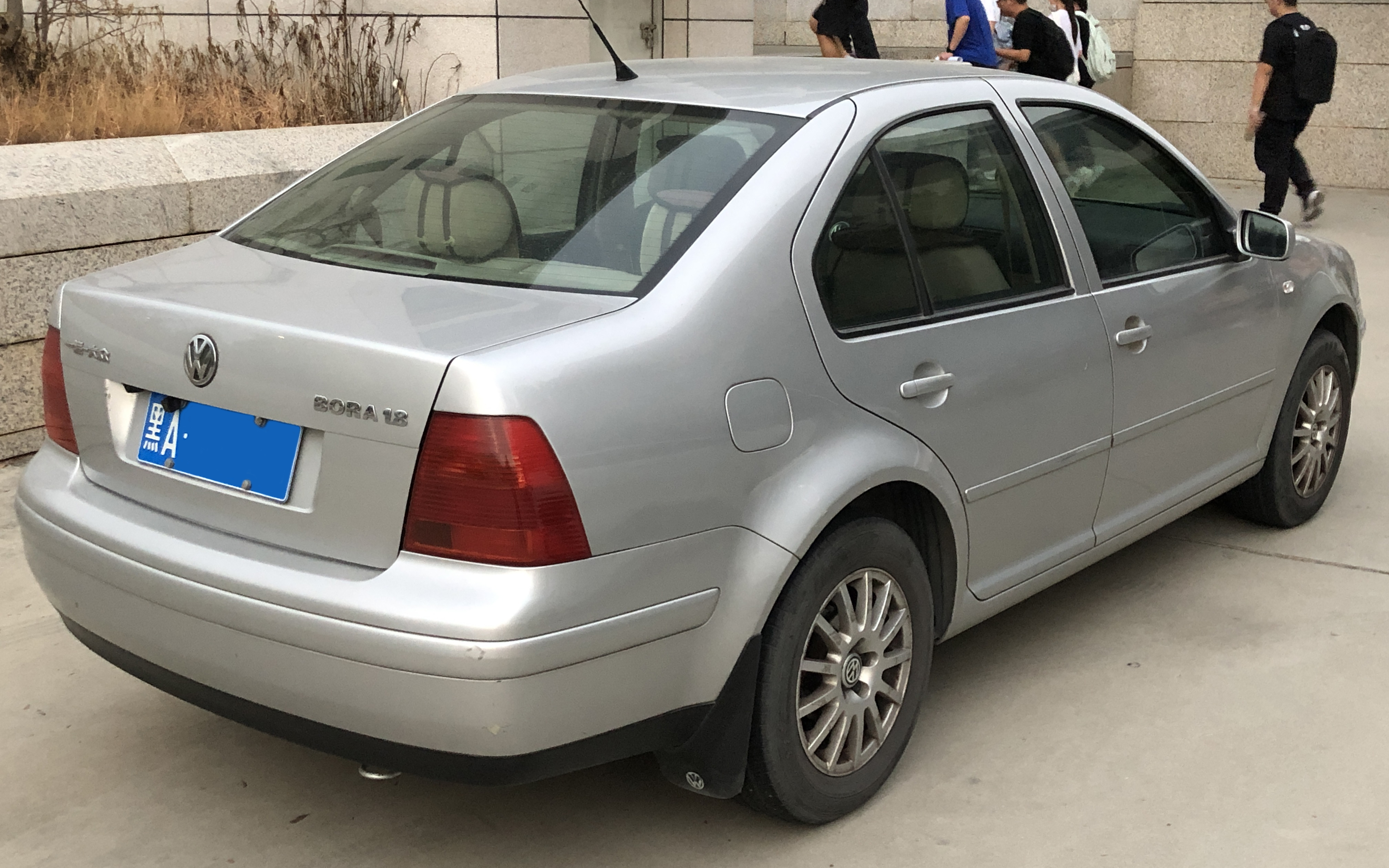
Volkswagen Bora I rear

=== 2006 facelift ===
The Bora in China received a facelift in the summer of 2006, with a Passat Mk5.5 lookalike face which is a rebadged City Jetta. The model available in Mexico, Colombia, Canada, Brazil and Argentina from 2008 was likewise facelifted with the same design found in China.

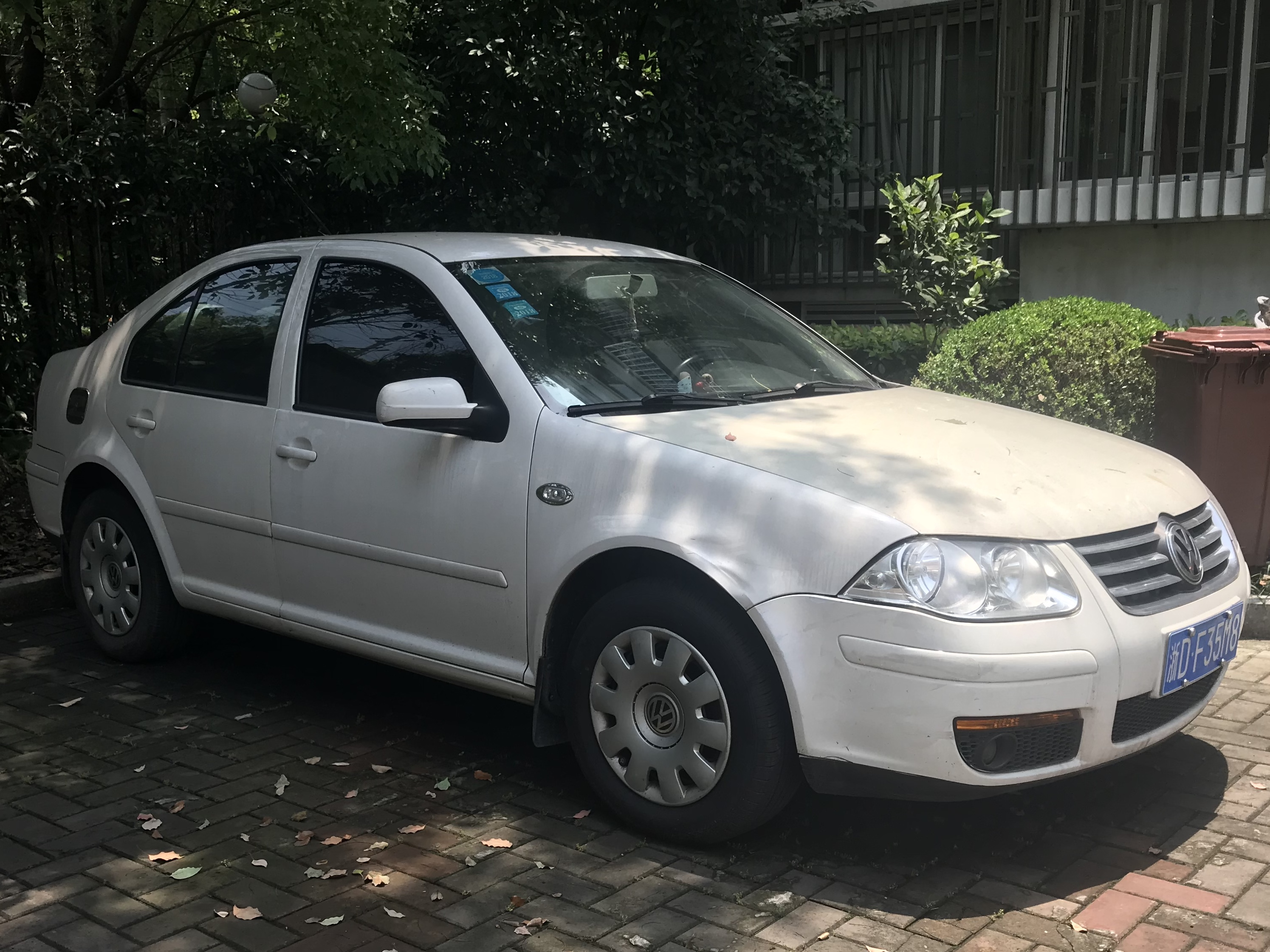
Volkswagen Bora I facelift

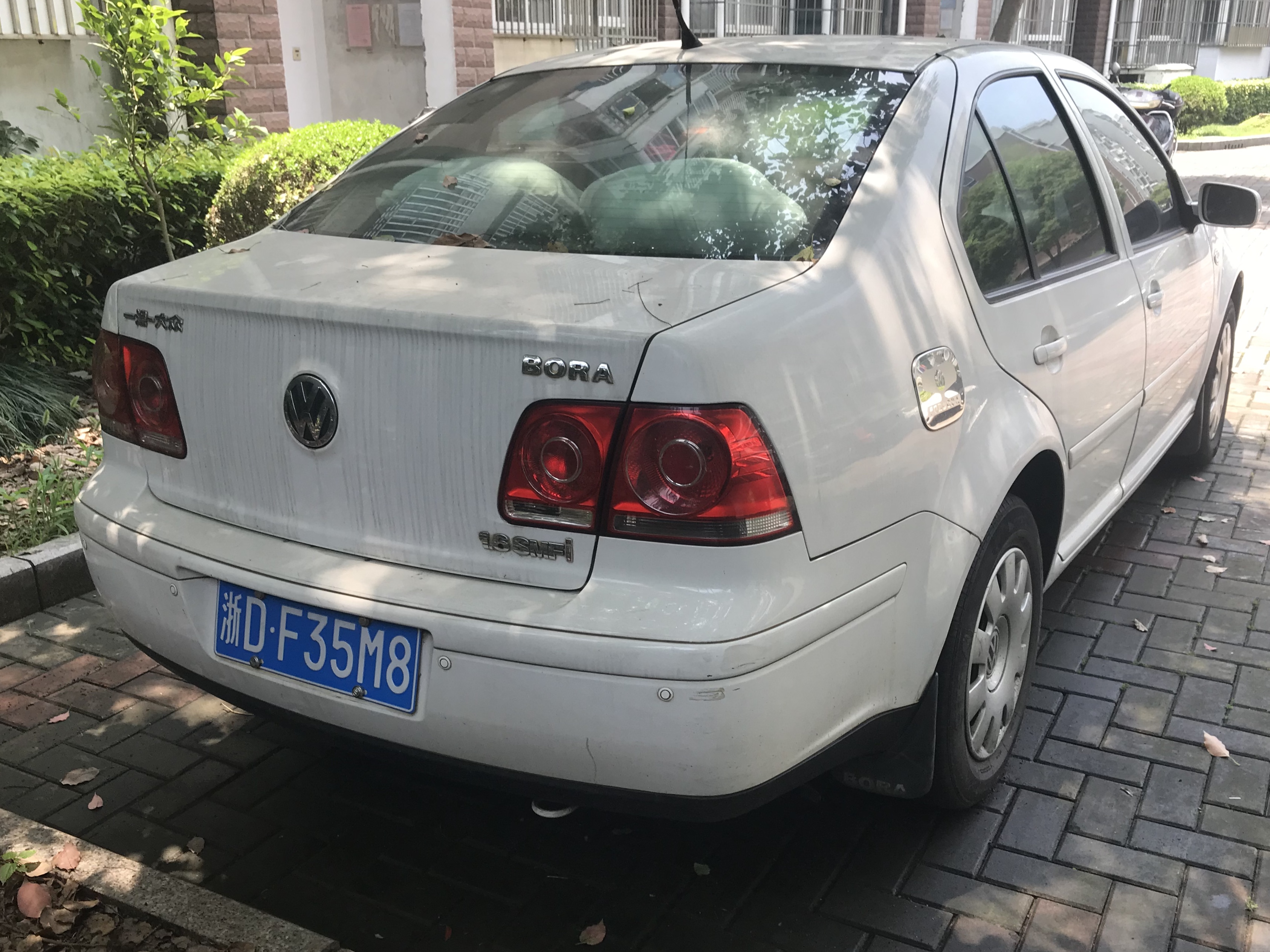
Volkswagen Bora I facelift rear

=== Bora HS ===
A hatchback version (i.e. the Golf) is also available after the facelift, and is badged as the Bora HS. Production began in 2006 and ended in 2008.

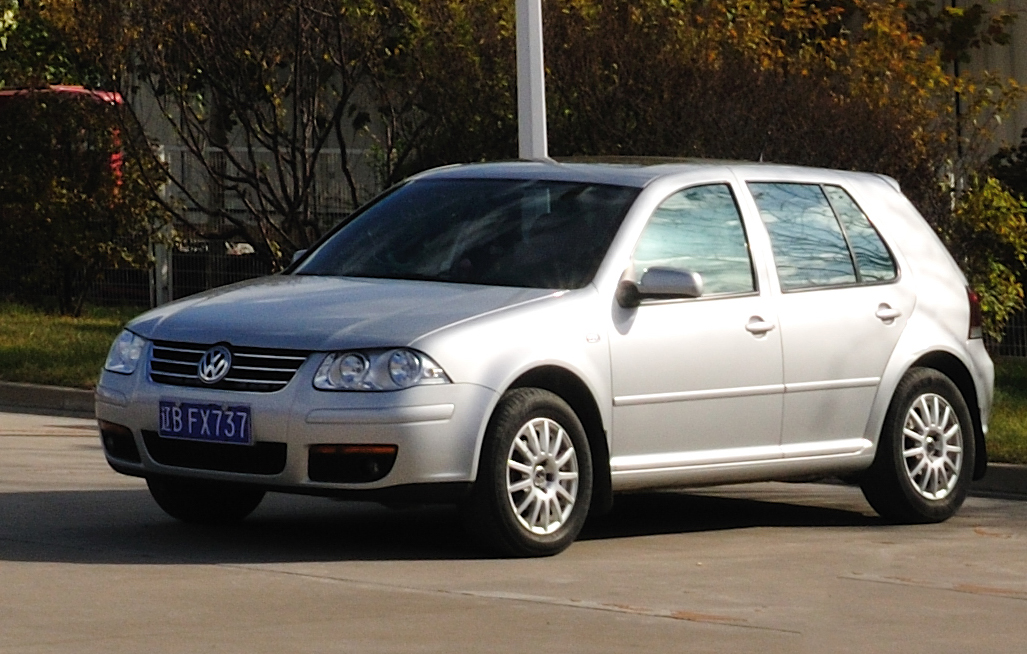
Volkswagen Bora HS front

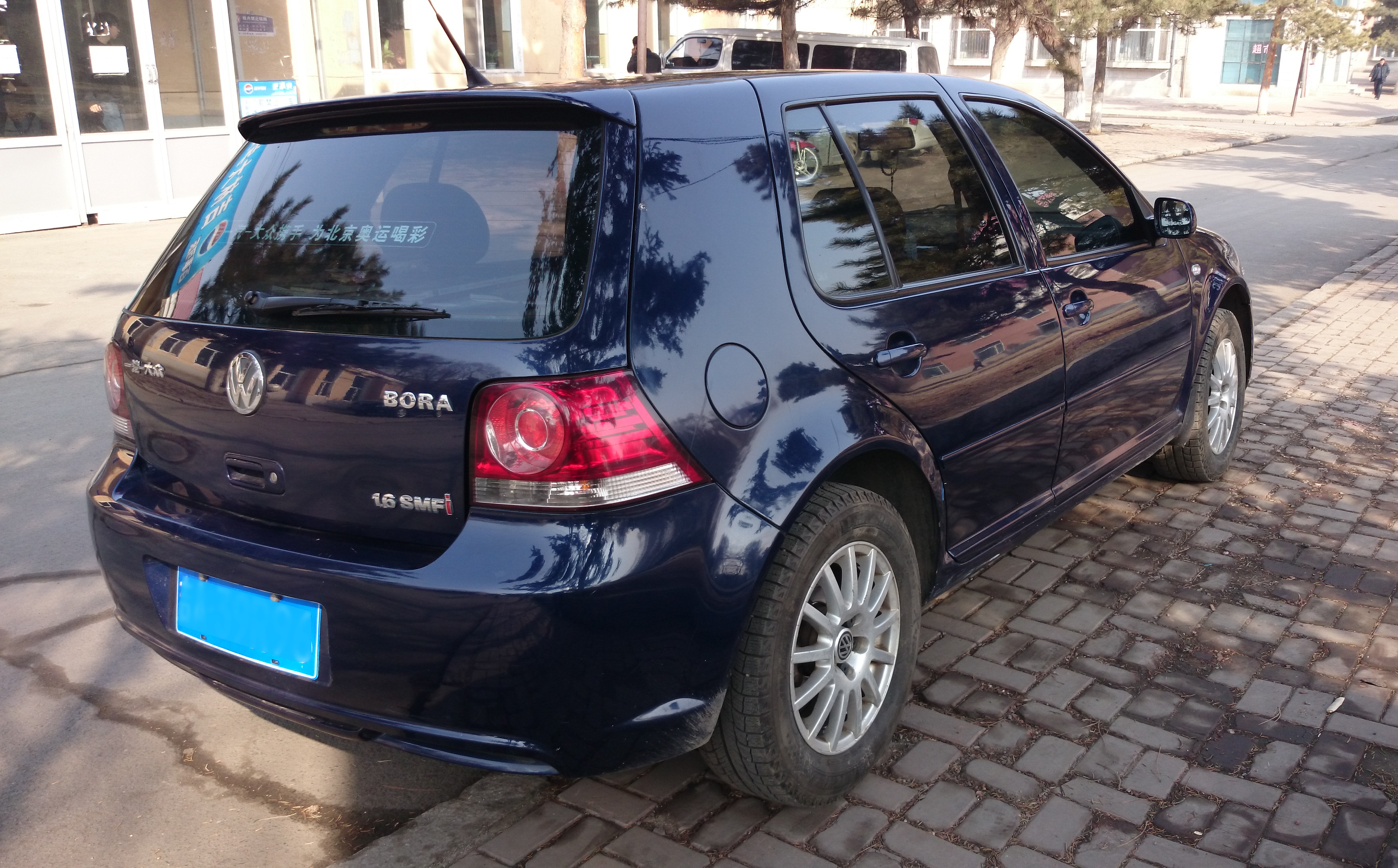
Volkswagen Bora HS rear

== Second generation (2008) ==
Second generation
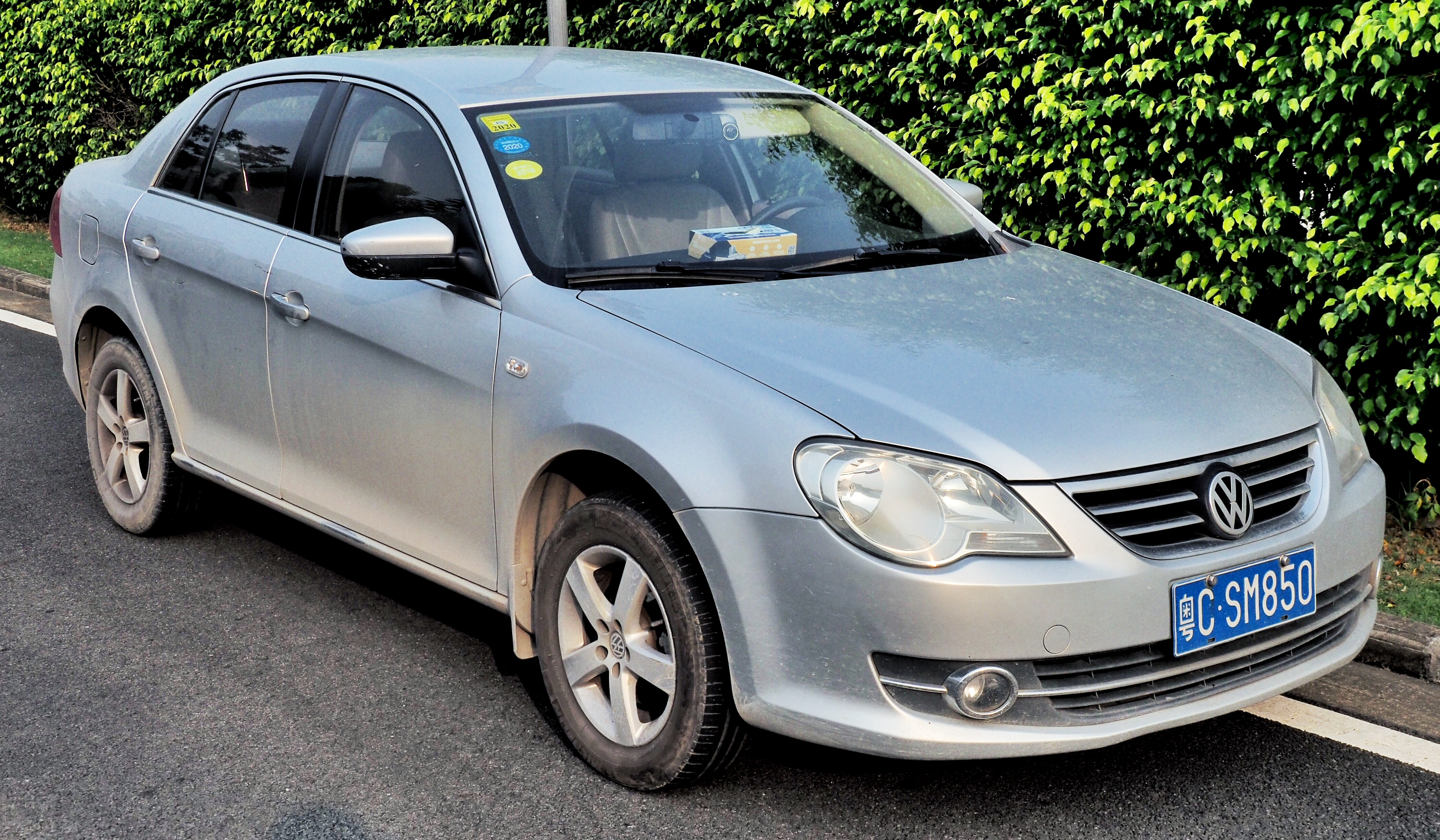

Overview
- Also called: Volkswagen New Bora (2008–2010)
- Production: 2008–2015
- Model years: 2008–2015
- Assembly: China: Changchun

Body and chassis
- Body style: 4-door sedan
- Platform: Volkswagen Group A4 (PQ34) platform
- Related: Volkswagen Golf Mk4; Volkswagen Lavida

Powertrain
- Engine: 1.4 L EA111 I4 (turbo petrol); 1.6 L EA111 I4 (petrol); 2.0 L EA113 I4 (petrol)
- Transmission: 5-speed manual 6-speed 02M manual 7-speed DCT

Dimensions
- Wheelbase: 2,610 mm (102.8 in)
- Length: 4,523 mm (178.1 in)
- Width: 1,775 mm (69.9 in)
- Height: 1,476 mm (58.1 in)

The Bora received a complete makeover in 2008, being marketed as the New Bora, and from 2010, only as the Bora. This new model was developed by FAW-Volkswagen and is still being based on same platform as Golf IV, but using some components from the newer PQ35 platform. Engine options for the second generation Bora are a 129 hp (96 kW; 131 PS) 1.4-liter TSI engine for the Sport model, a 118 hp (88 kW; 120 PS) 2.0-liter engine and a 100–103 hp (75–77 kW; 101–104 PS) 1.6-liter engine for regular models.

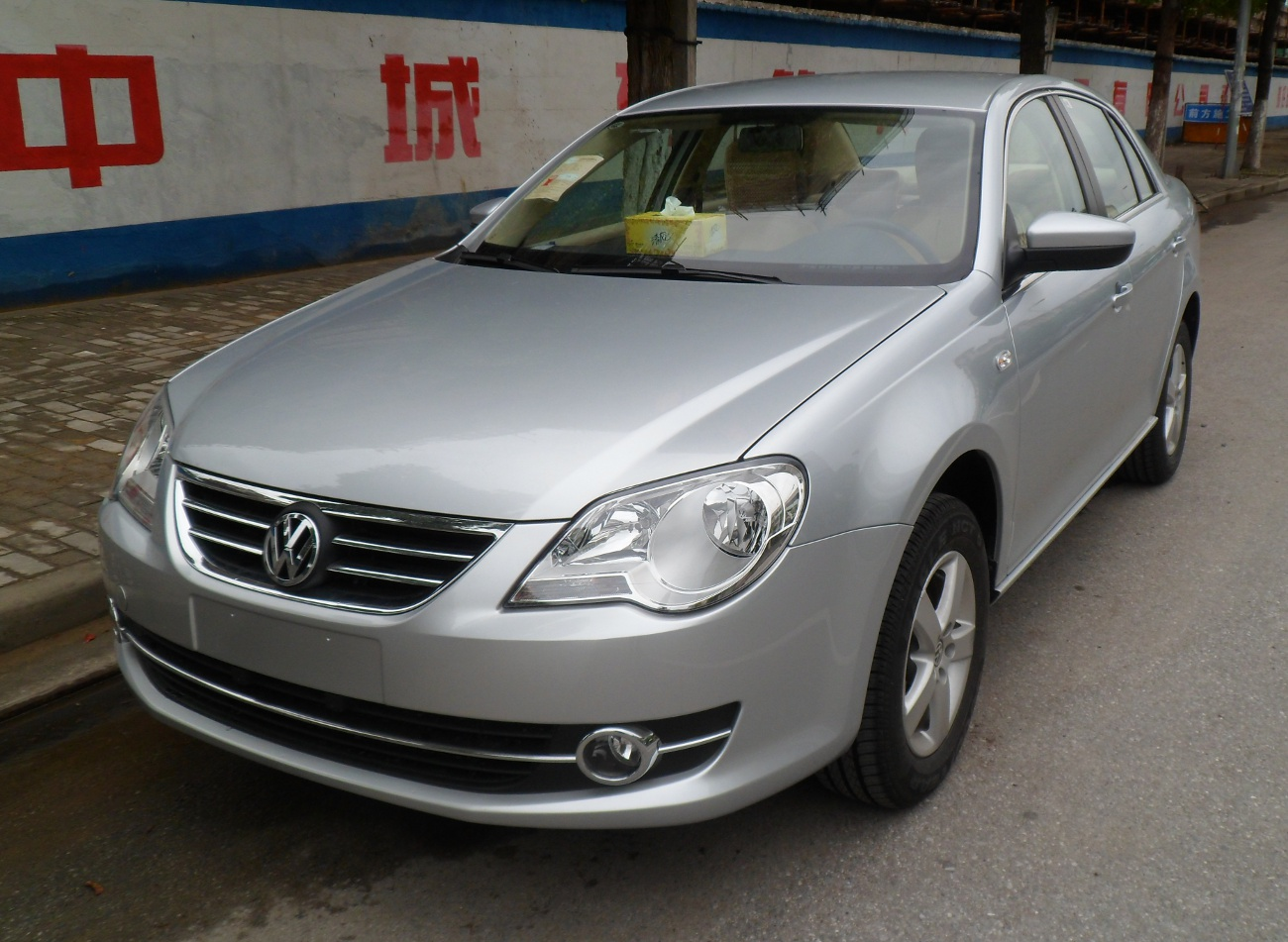
Volkswagen Bora II front pre-facelift

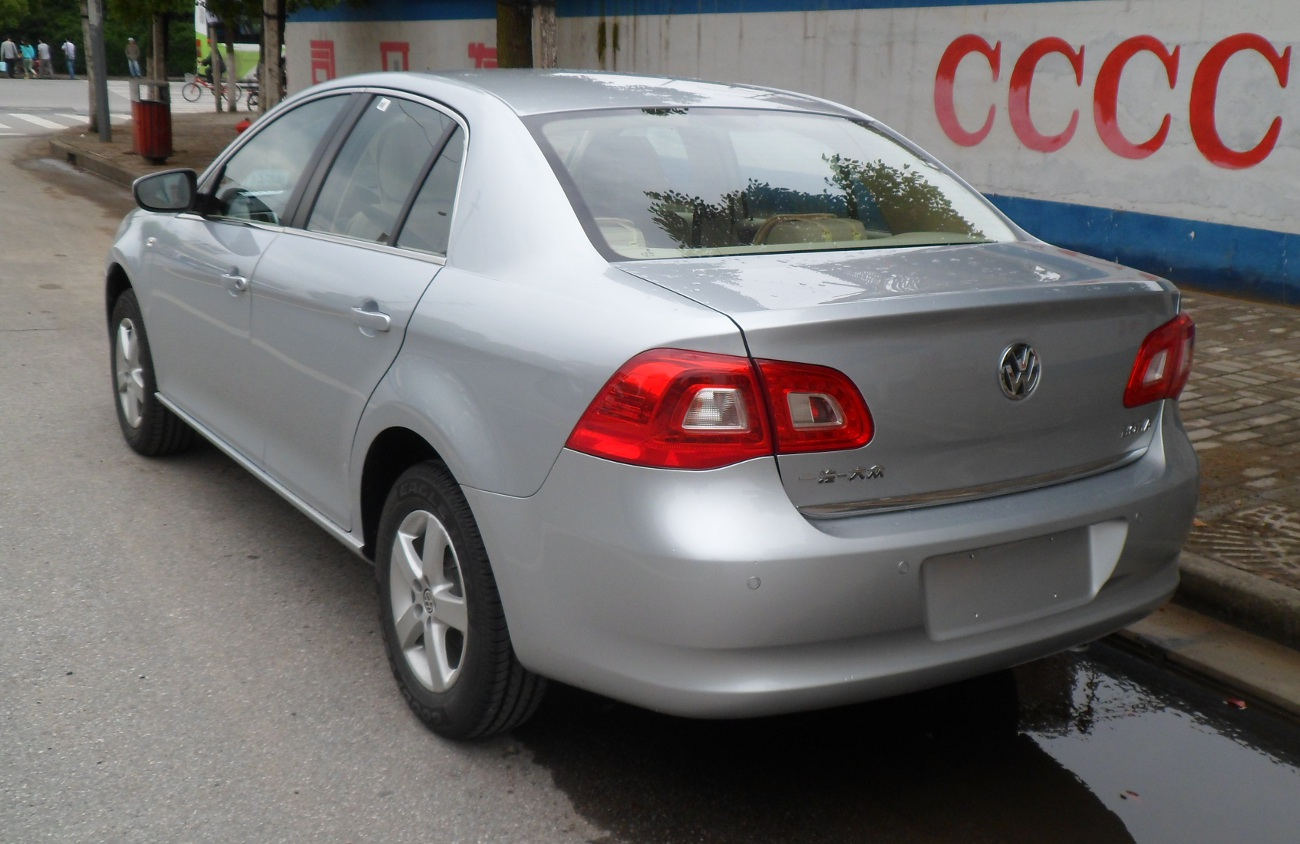
Volkswagen Bora II rear pre-facelift

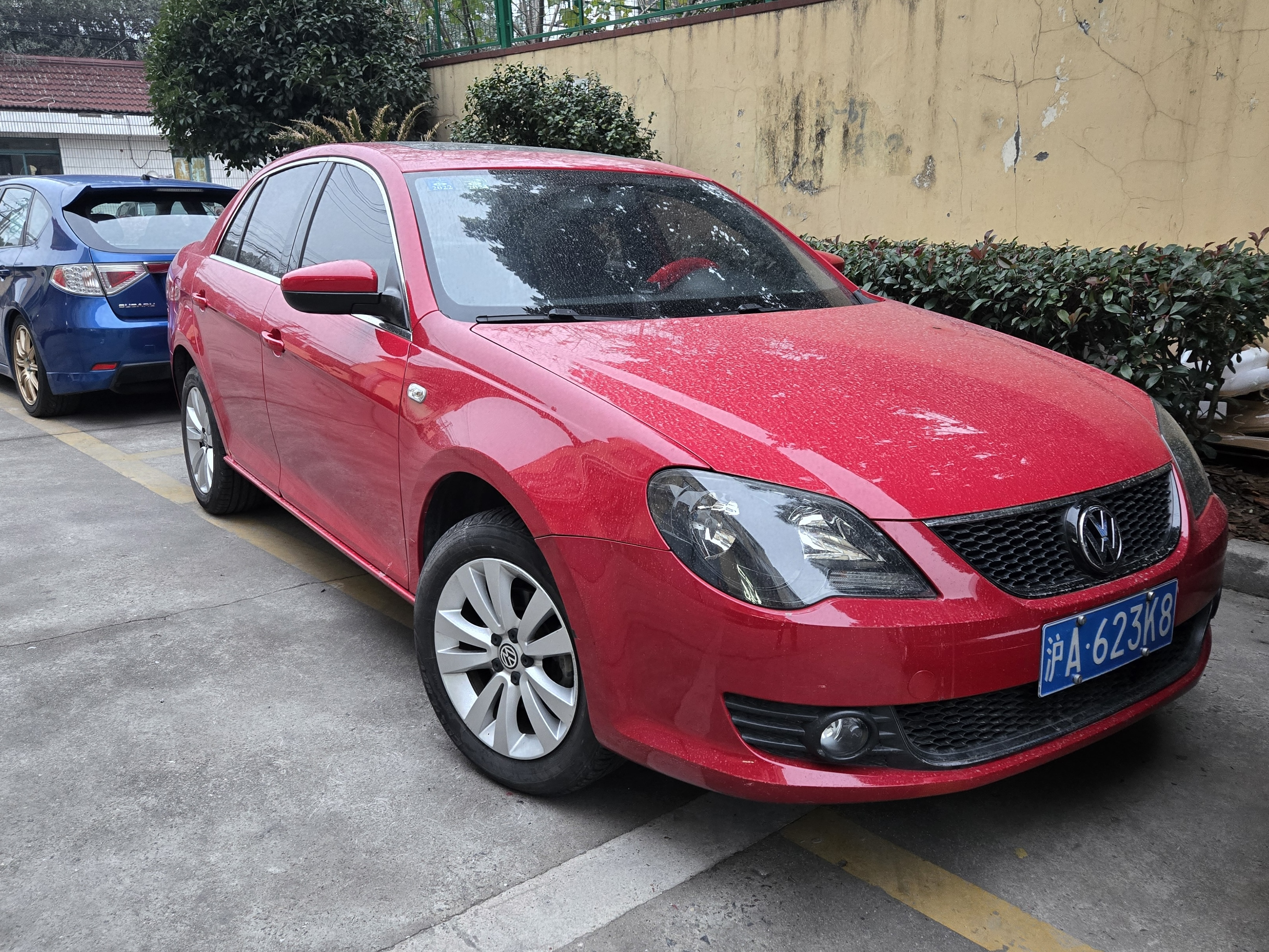
Volkswagen Bora II TSI Sport front

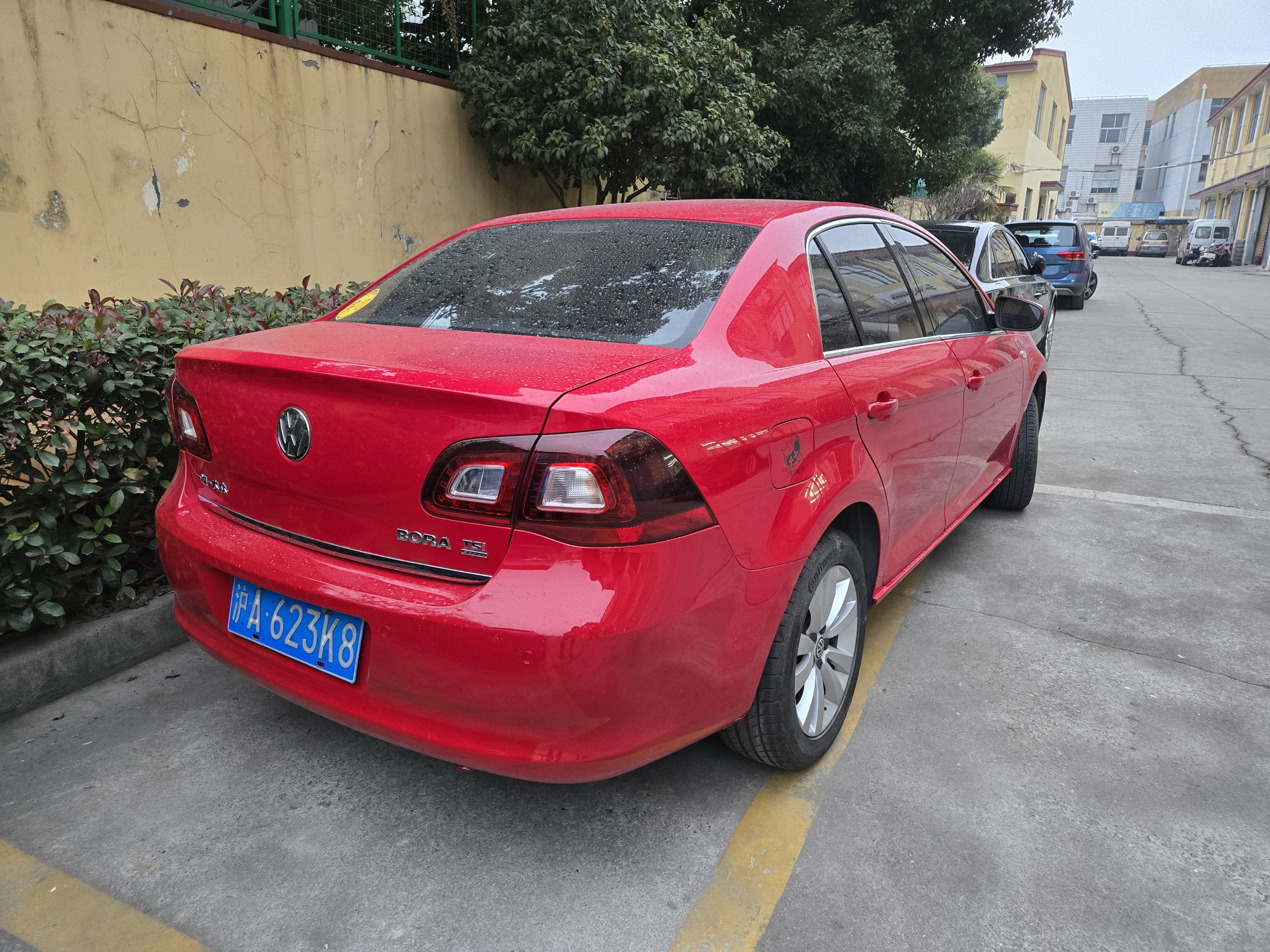
Volkswagen Bora II TSI Sport rear

=== 2013 facelift ===
The Bora had a major facelift in December 2012, and a sportier and more premium trim level was created called the Volkswagen Bora Sportline.

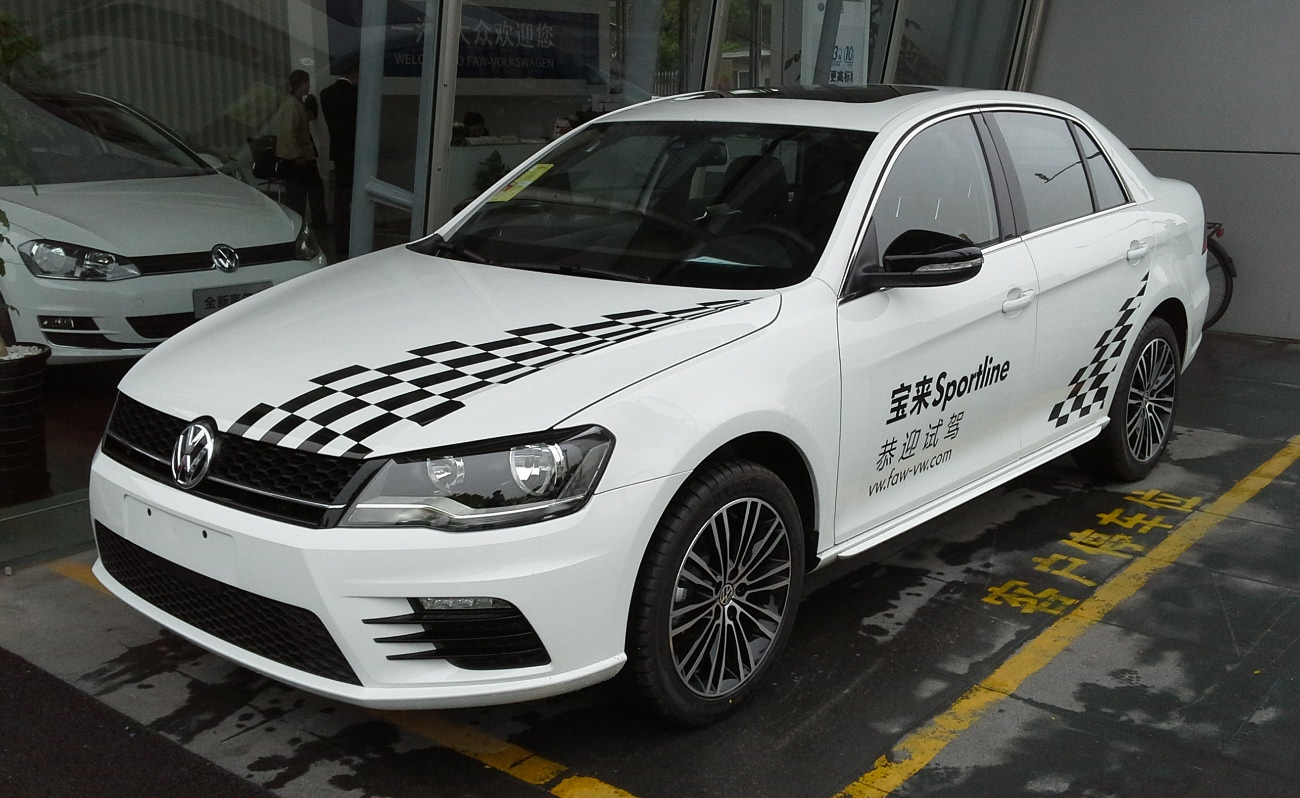
Volkswagen Bora II facelift Sportline front

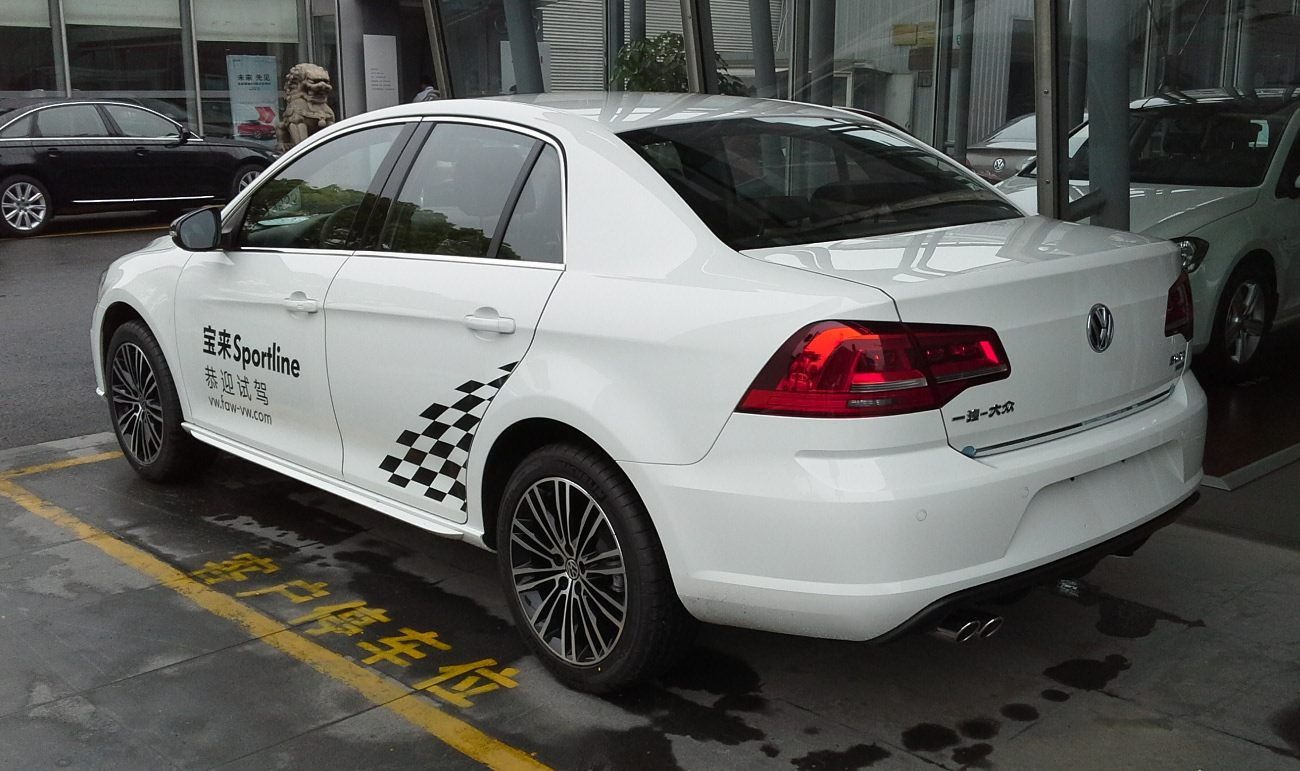
Volkswagen Bora II facelift Sportline rear

== Third generation (2016) ==
Third generation
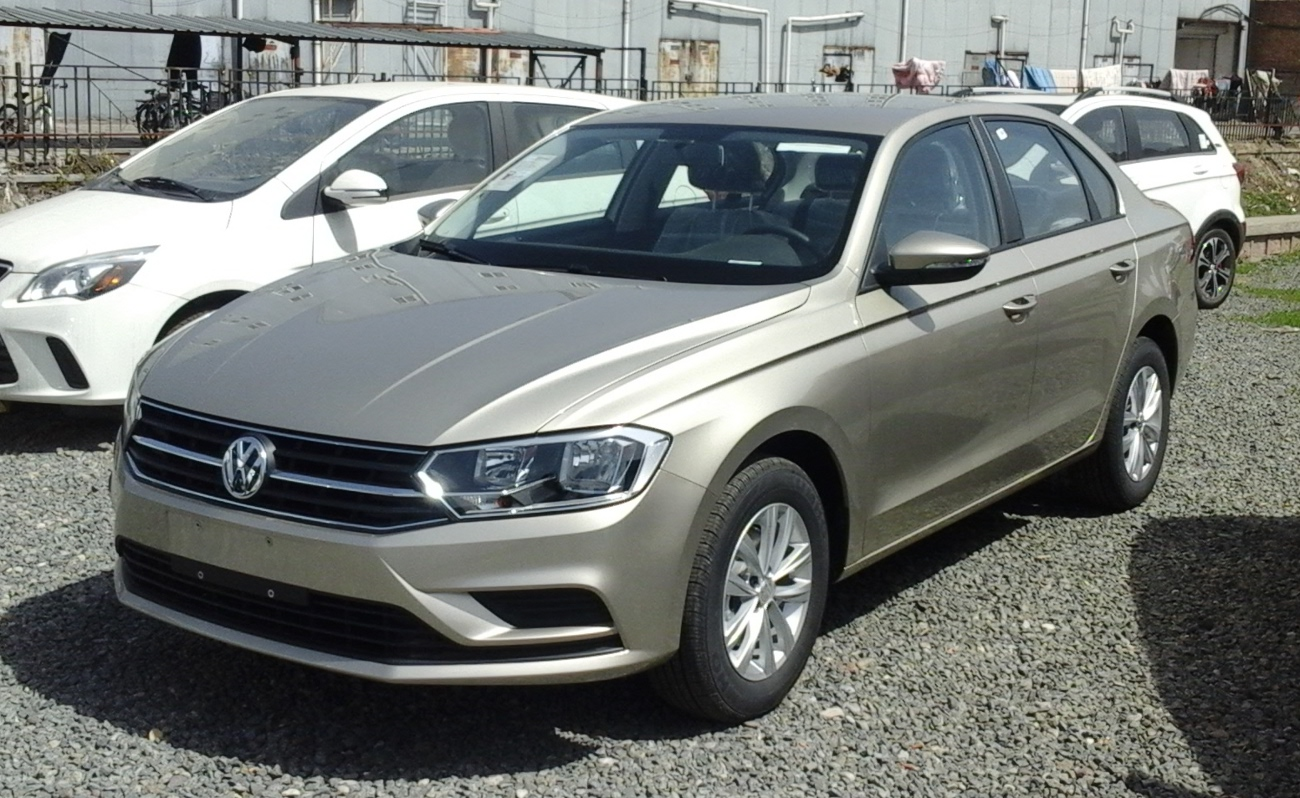

Overview
- Also called: Volkswagen Bora Classic (2018–2022)
- Production: 2015–2022
- Model years: 2016–2022
- Assembly: China: Changchun

Body and chassis
- Body style: 4-door sedan 5-door wagon
- Platform: Volkswagen Group A4 (PQ34) platform
- Related: Volkswagen Golf Mk4; Volkswagen Lavida

Powertrain
- Engine: 1.4 L EA211 I4 (petrol); 1.5 L EA211 I4 (petrol); 1.6 L EA211 I4 (petrol)
- Transmission: 5-speed manual 6-speed 02M manual 7-speed DSG

Dimensions
- Wheelbase: 2,614 mm (102.9 in)
- Length: 4,562 mm (179.6 in)
- Width: 1,793 mm (70.6 in)
- Height: 1,468 mm (57.8 in)

In March 2016 the model received another complete makeover featuring a completely redesigned exterior while continuing the platform, the engines, and the interior of the previous generation.

Two engines are available, both are updated units from the previous Bora models, with a 1.6-liter engine with 110 PS (81 kW; 108 hp) and 155 N⋅m (114 lb⋅ft), and a 1.4-liter turbo engine with 129 hp (96 kW; 131 PS) and 225 N⋅m (166 lb⋅ft). The 1.6-liter engine is mated to a five-speed manual transmission or a six-speed automatic transmission, and the 1.4-liter turbo engine is mated to a seven-speed DCT.

This generation is still available as of May 2019 as the Bora Classic with three trim levels and pricing is between 106,800 and 116,800 yuan (15,440 to 16,890 USD).

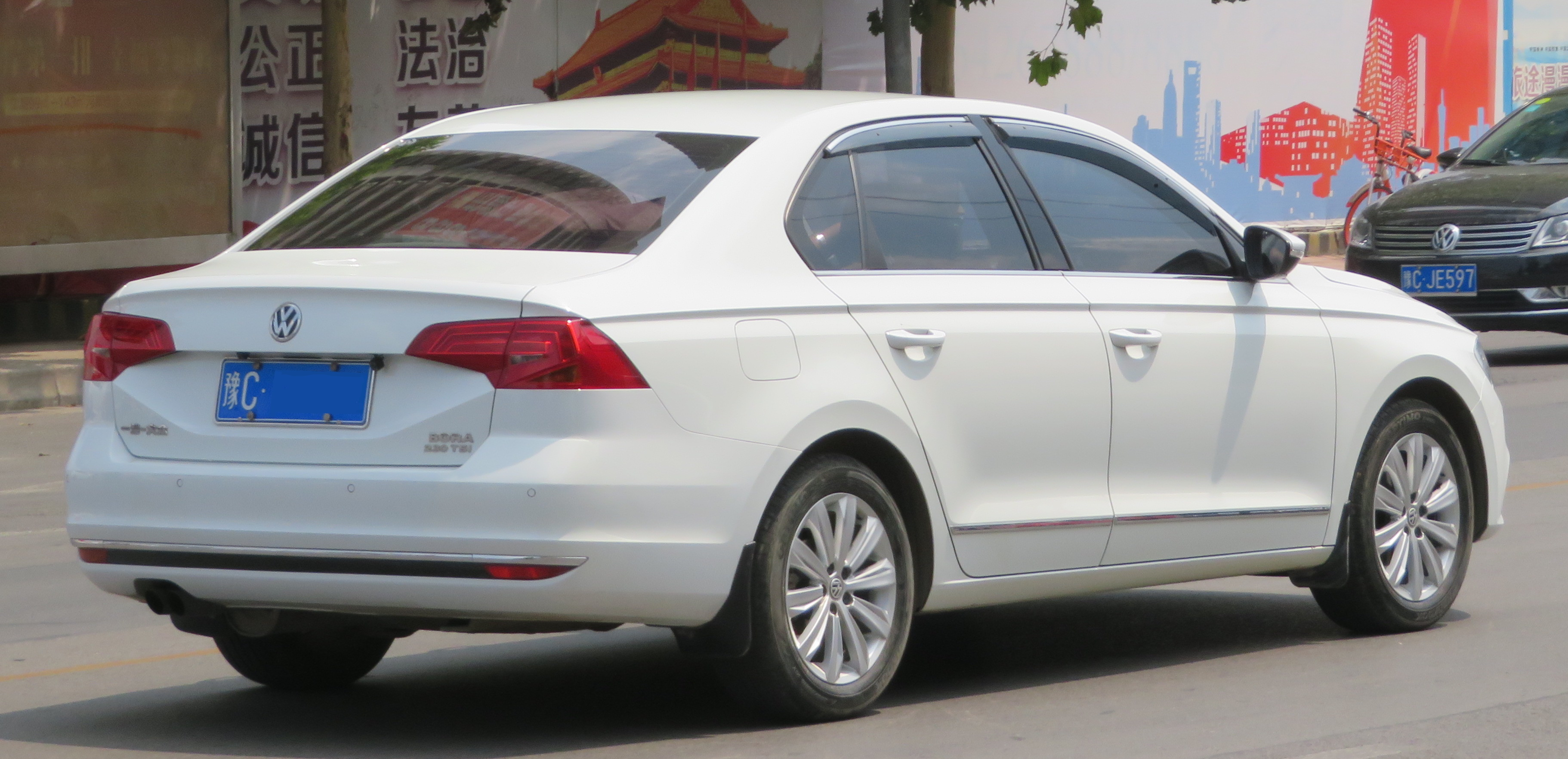
Volkswagen Bora III rear

=== Volkswagen C-Trek ===
The FAW-Volkswagen later launched a lifted wagon version of the updated Bora called the Volkswagen C-Trek.

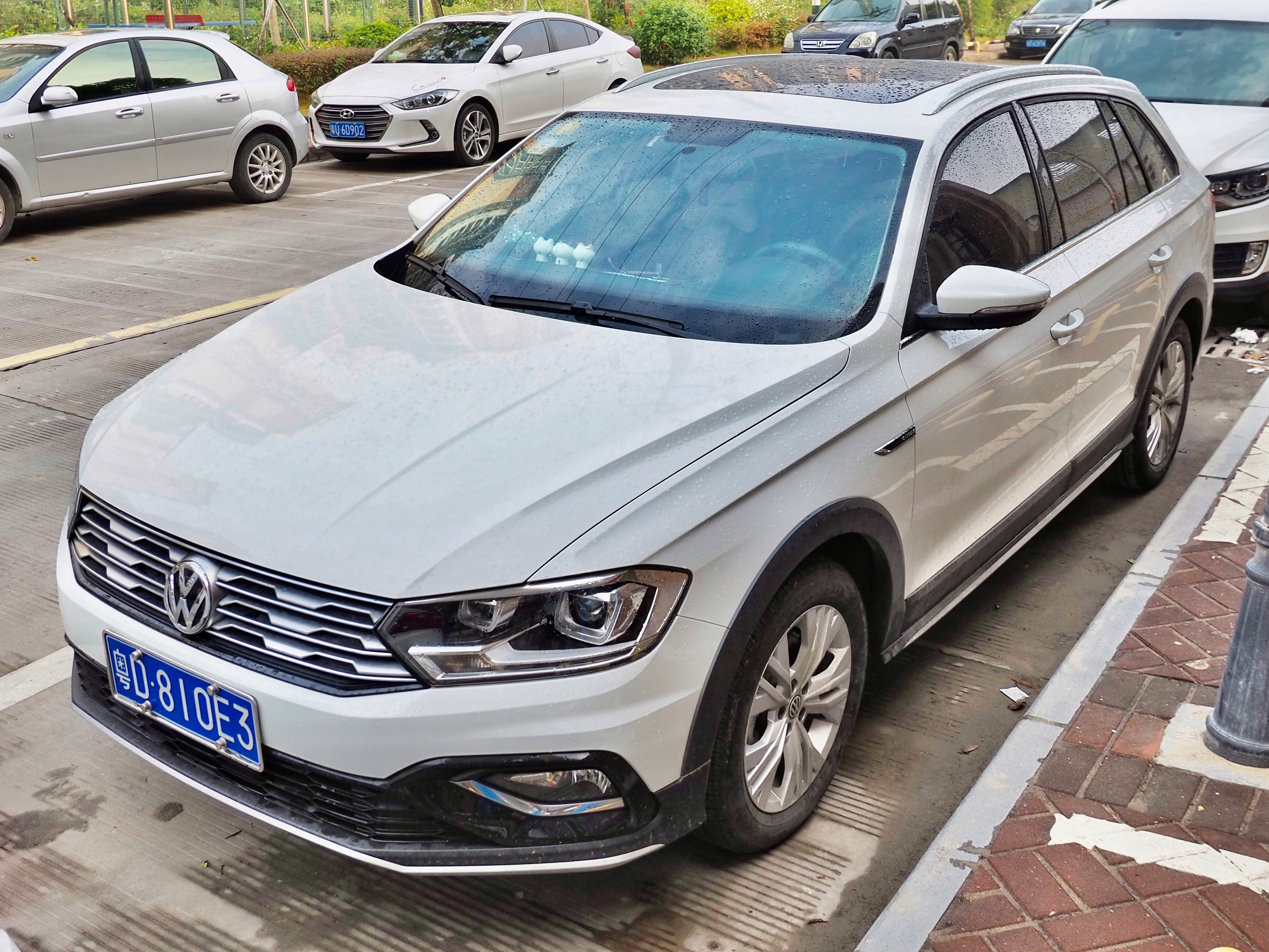
Volkswagen C-Trek (China)

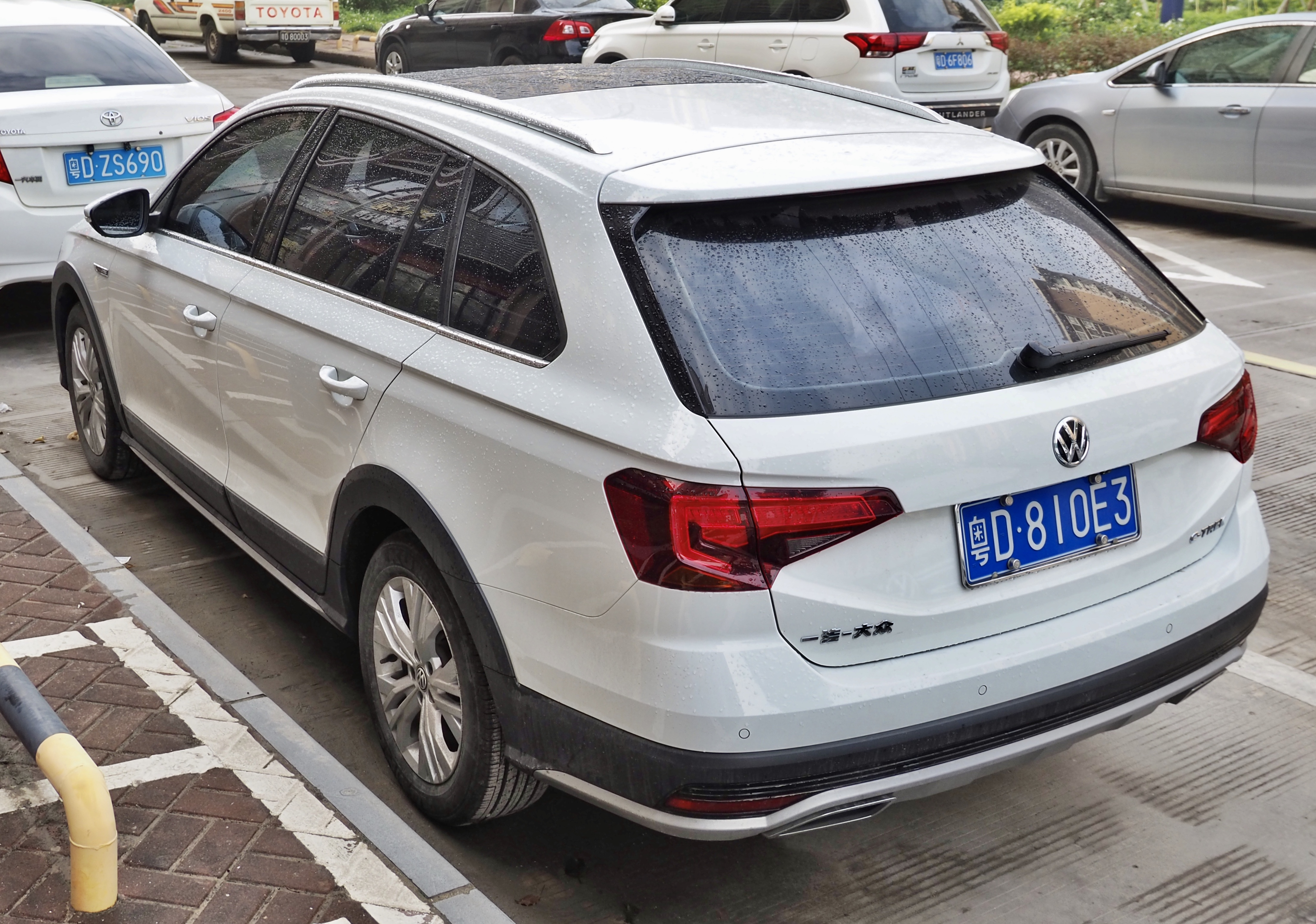
Volkswagen C-Trek rear (China)

== Fourth generation (2018) ==
Fourth generation
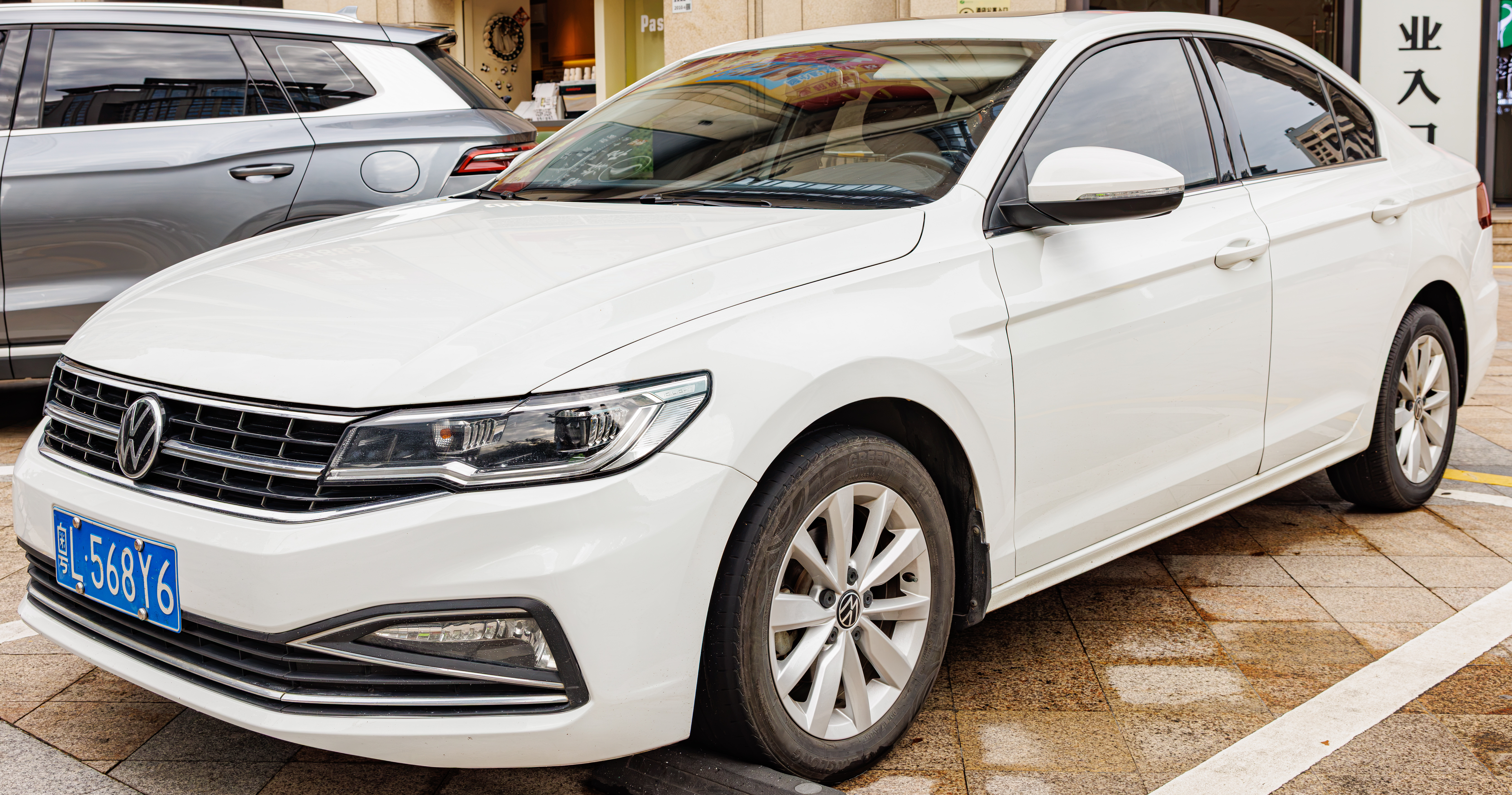

Overview
- Production: 2018-2026
- Assembly: China: Qingdao

Body and chassis
- Body style: 4-door sedan
- Platform: Volkswagen Group MQB platform
- Related: Volkswagen Lavida Plus; Volkswagen Sagitar S

Powertrain
- Engine: 1.4 L EA211 turbo I4 (petrol); 1.5 L EA211 turbo I4 (petrol)
- Transmission: 6-speed 02M manual 7-speed DSG
- Electric range: 270 km (168 mi)

Dimensions
- Wheelbase: 2,688 mm (105.8 in)
- Length: 4,663 mm (183.6 in)
- Width: 1,815 mm (71.5 in)
- Height: 1,473 mm (58.0 in)
- Kerb weight: 1,560 kg (3,440 lb) (e-Bora)

In April 2018, FAW-Volkswagen revealed a new Volkswagen Bora sedan based on the MQB platform. The new model is similarly sized compared with the just revealed Volkswagen Lavida Plus which also stands on the MQB platform. The new Volkswagen Bora is available in the Chinese car market in September 2018 with prices starting from around 115,000 yuan.

The powertrain of the fourth generation Bora is equipped with a 1.4-liter turbo inline-4 engine developing 148 hp (110 kW; 150 PS) and 250 N⋅m (184 lb⋅ft) or a 1.5-liter engine developing 113 hp (84 kW; 115 PS) and 150 N⋅m (111 lb⋅ft).

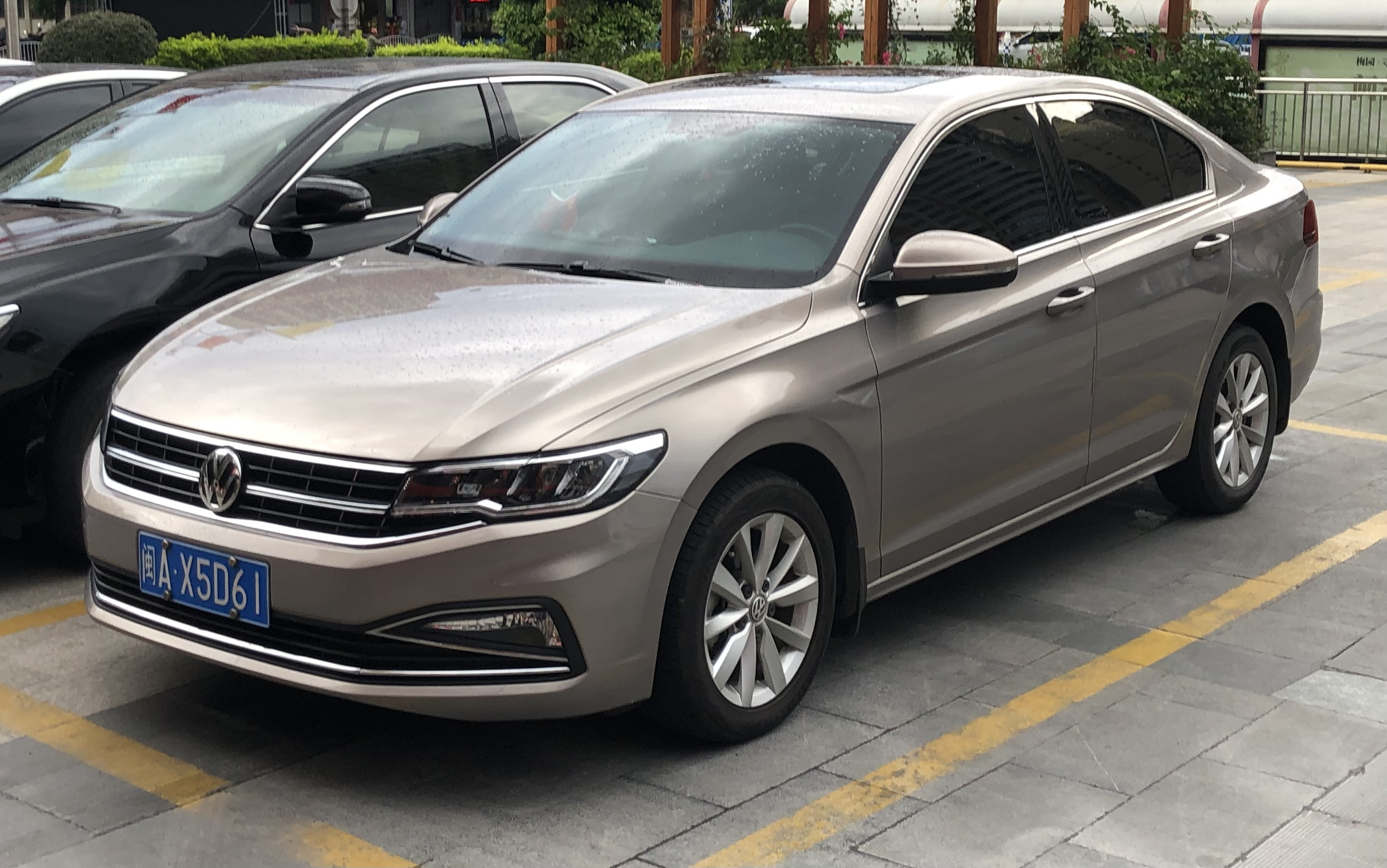
2018 Volkswagen Bora

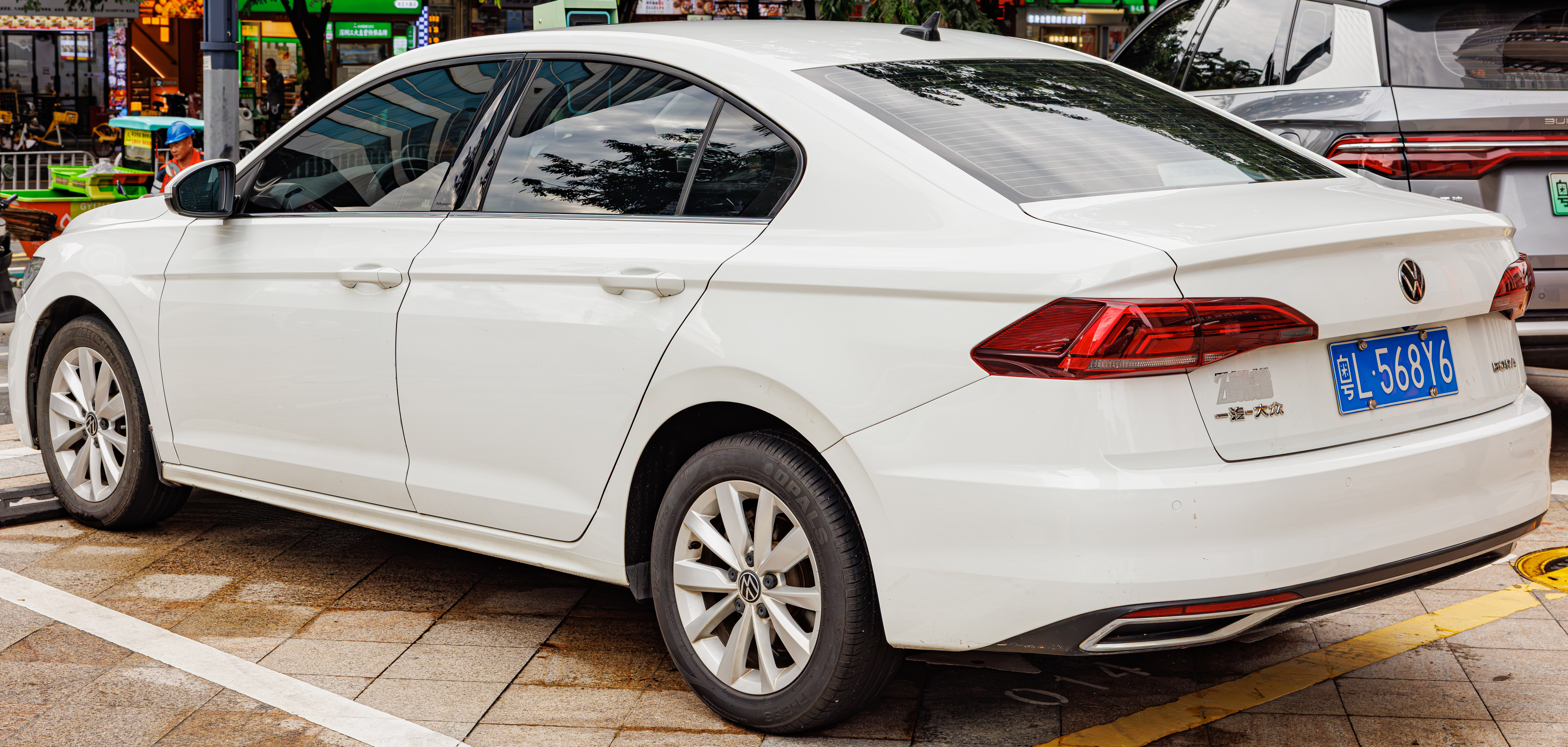
2018 Volkswagen Bora rear

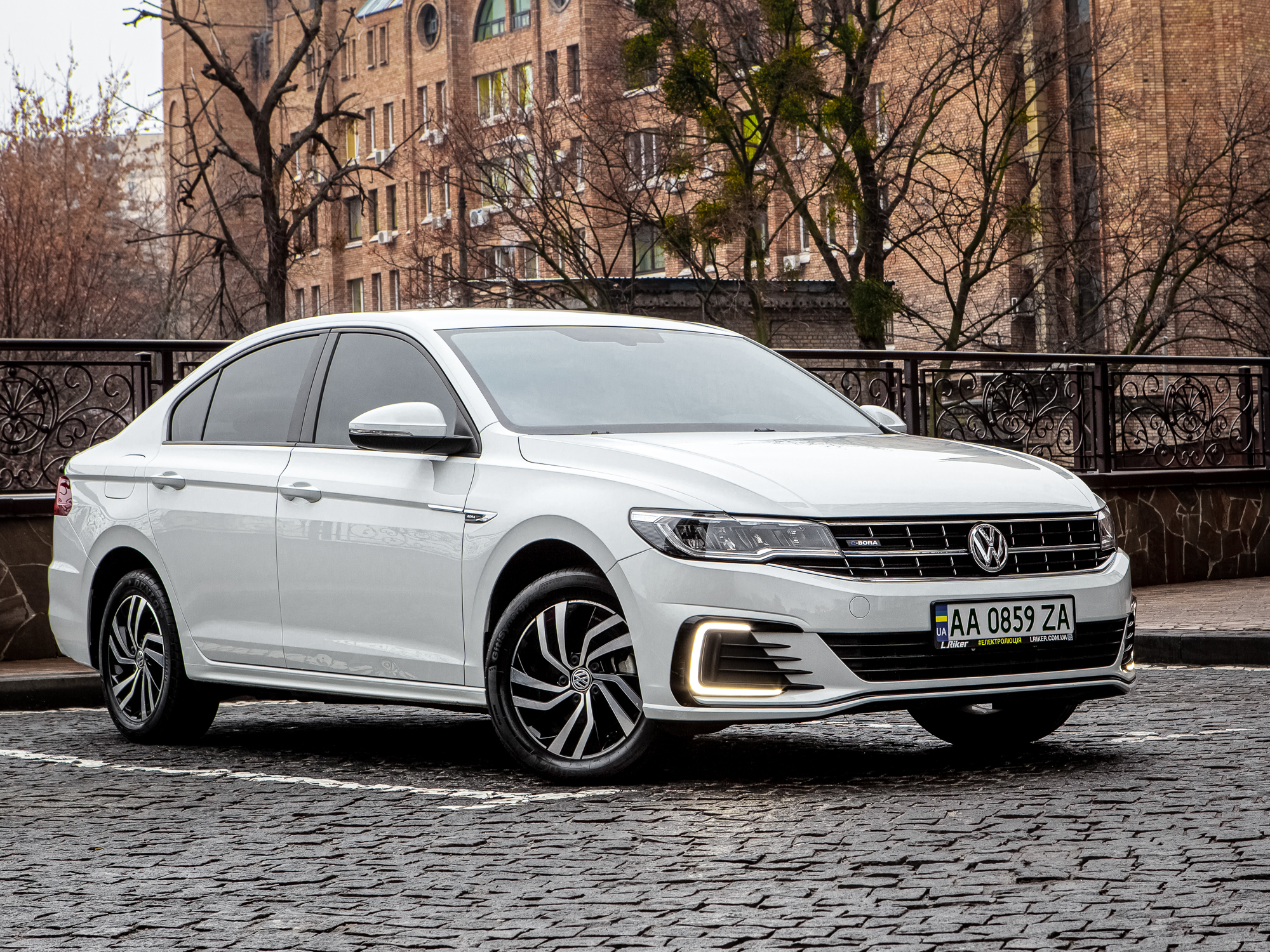
Volkswagen e-Bora

=== 2022 facelift ===
The fourth generation Volkswagen Bora received a facelift for the 2022 model year in the Chinese market. The update was launched in June 2022, with slightly revised exterior styling and slight adjustments to the powertrain options. The 1.5-liter engine was cancelled with the main powertrain options including a 1.2-liter turbocharged engine and a 1.4-liter turbocharged engine. the 1.2-liter engine develops a maximum output of 114 hp (85 kW; 116 PS) and 200 N⋅m (148 lb⋅ft), while the 1.4-liter engine produces 148 hp (110 kW; 150 PS) and 250 N⋅m (184 lb⋅ft) with gearbox options including a 5-speed manual gearbox and a 7-speed dual clutch transmission.

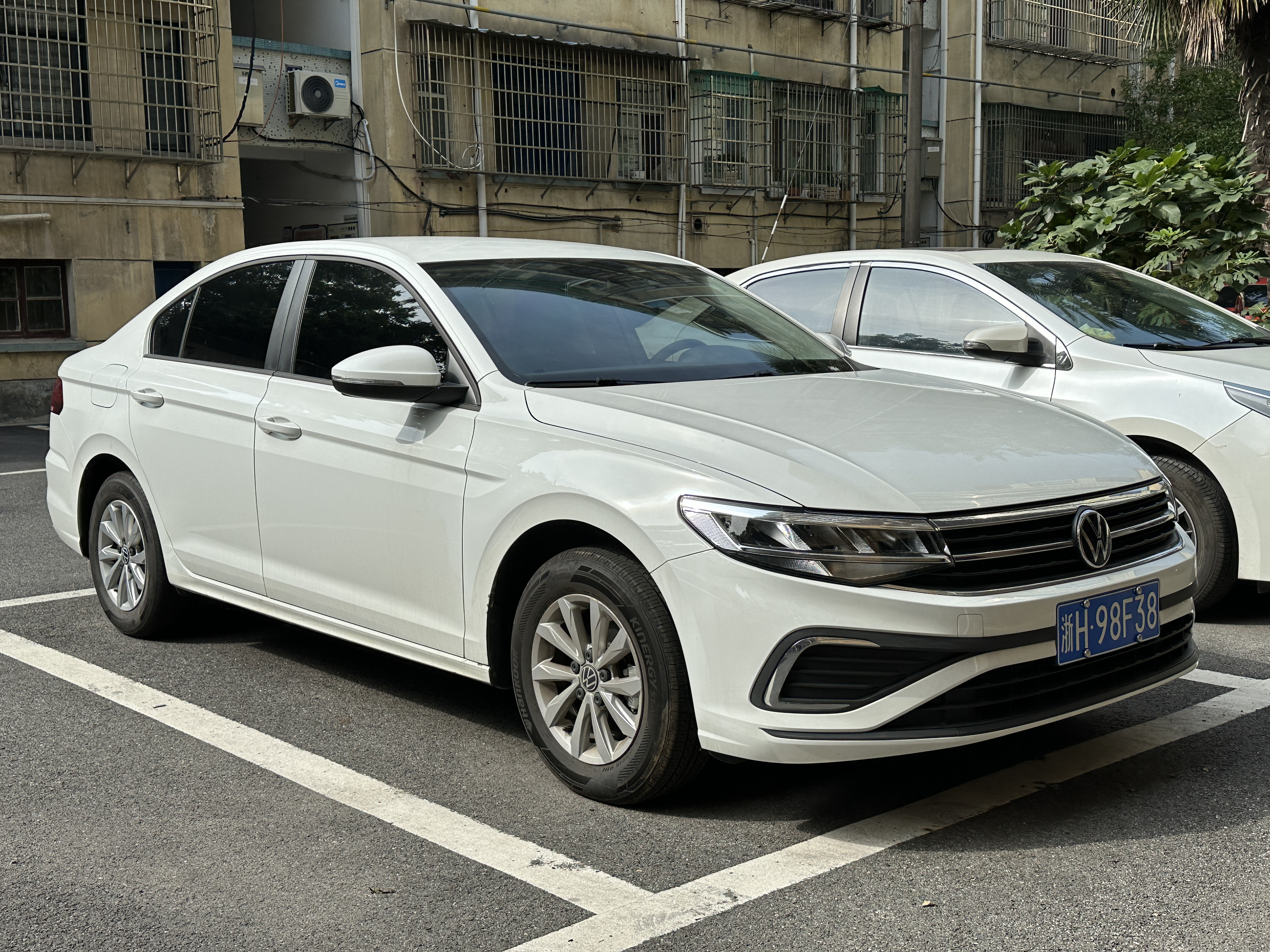
Volkswagen Bora IV MY2022

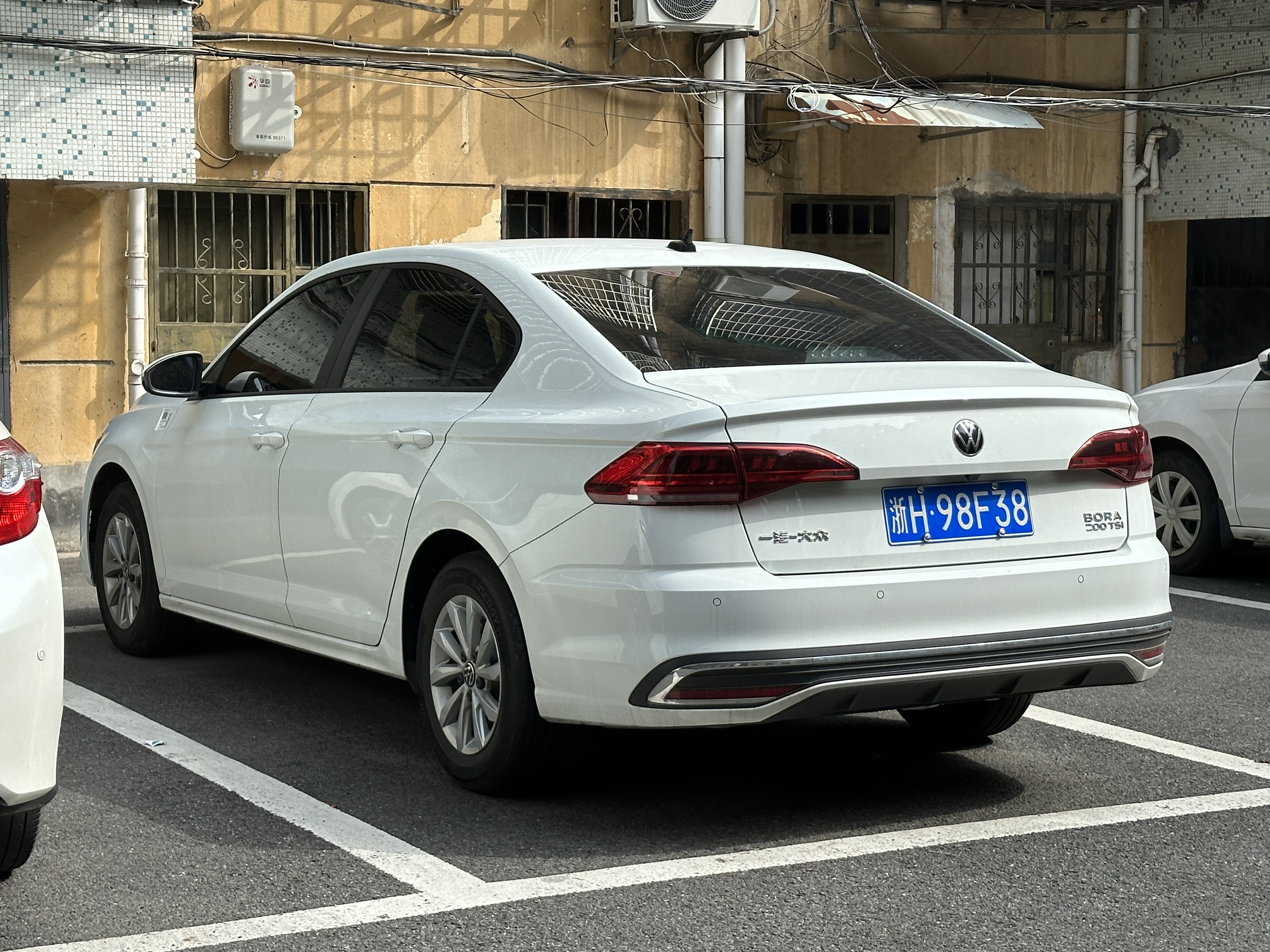
Volkswagen Bora IV MY2022 rear quarter

== Sales ==
Year	China
2023	160,171
2024	101,848
2025	77,920
