= Volkswagen ID. Life =

Volkswagen concept vehicle

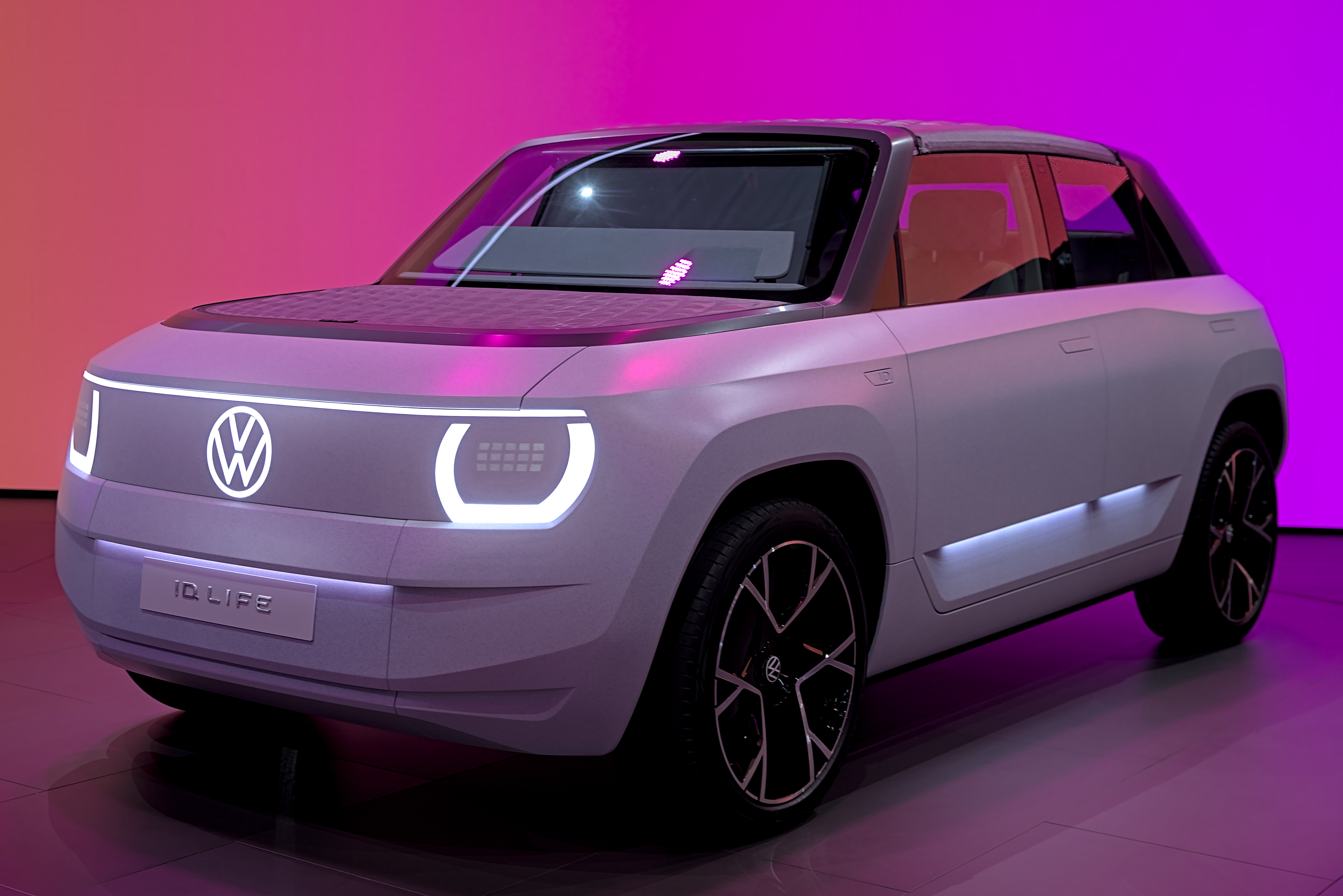
- 2021 Volkswagen ID. Life at the 2021 International Motor Show Germany (front)

Overview
- Manufacturer: Volkswagen
- Production: 2021
- Assembly: Spain: Pamplona (Volkswagen Navarra, S.A.)
- Designer: Jozef Kabaň

Body and chassis
- Class: Subcompact car
- Body style: 5-door SUV
- Layout: Front-motor, front-wheel drive
- Platform: Volkswagen MEB-Small Platform

Powertrain
- Electric motor: Permanent Magnet Motor on Front Axle
- Power output: 172 kW (234 PS)
- Battery: 57 kWh battery pack

Dimensions
- Wheelbase: 2,649 mm (104.3 in)
- Length: 4,105 mm (161.6 in)
- Width: 1,844 mm (72.6 in)
- Height: 1,600 mm (63 in)

The Volkswagen ID. Life is an electric subcompact SUV concept revealed by German automobile manufacturer Volkswagen at the 2021 International Motor Show Germany. In 2022, it was reported that the ID. Life concept has fallen out of favour in Wolfsburg already, to be replaced by models probably named ID.2(X), and designed closer to existing VW models, like Volkswagen Polo or Volkswagen T-Cross.

== Overview ==
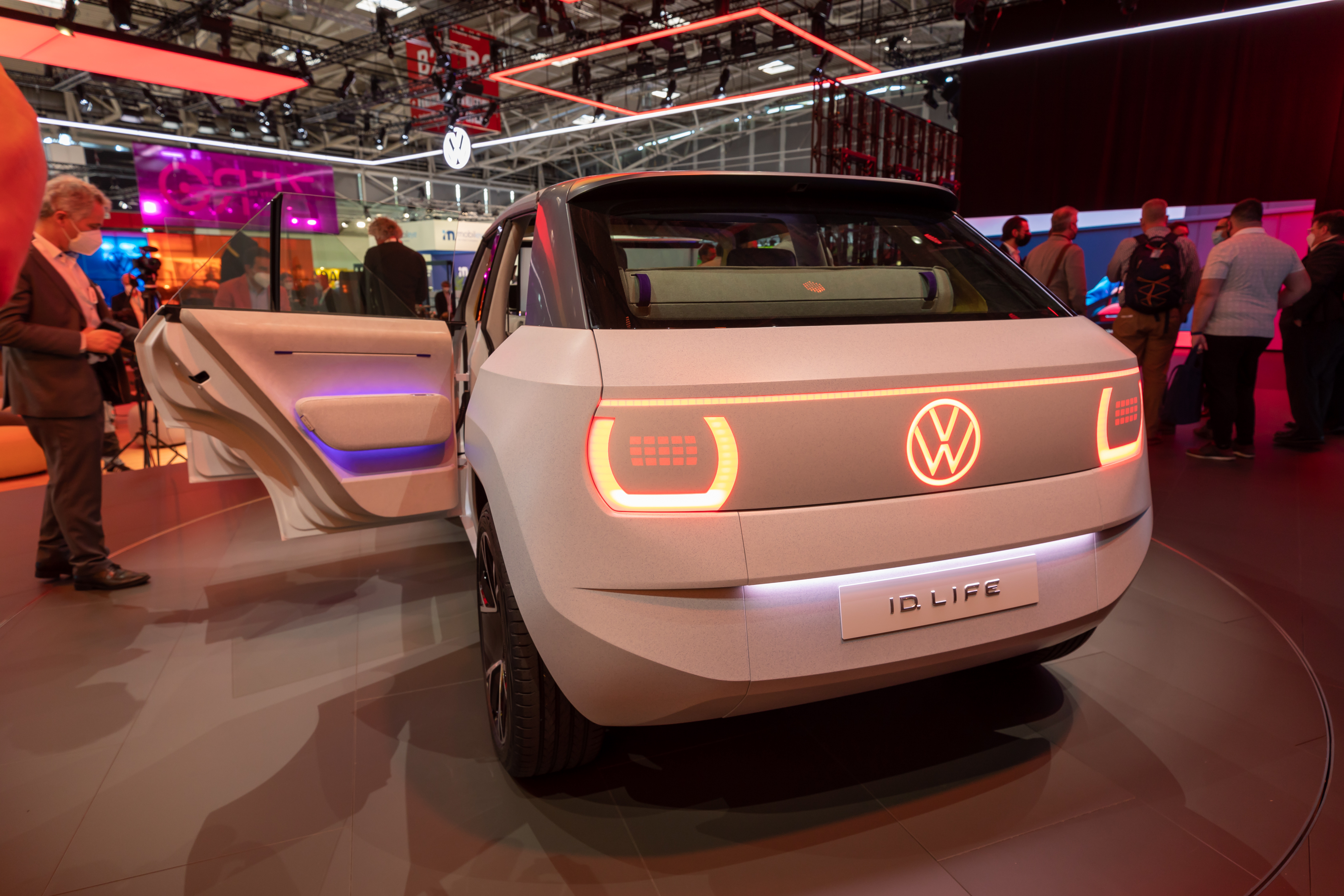
Rear view

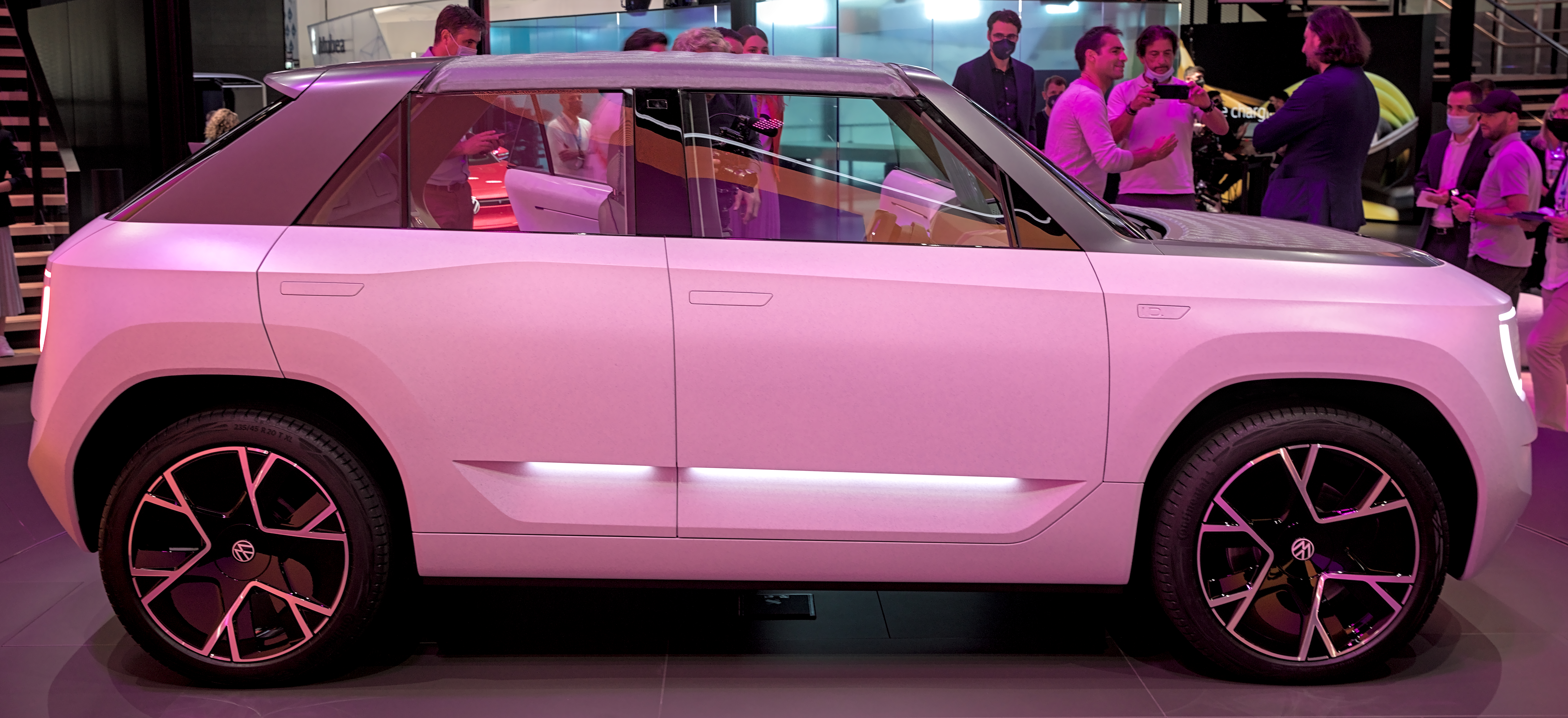
Side view

The Volkswagen ID. Life concept was revealed at International Motor Show Germany on September 7, 2021, in Munich, Germany. It is a retro-styled 5-door electric subcompact SUV. The ID. Life was designed by Klaus Zyciora and Slovak automobile designer Jozef Kabaň, who says "Volkswagen's design language always has to move in a more timeless direction. It fits the brand. We want to be authentic and clear and use real materials; there's no fake of any kind or trying to look like something else. Fake exhaust outlets, fake wood, and so on. We want our cars to be well balanced.”

== Specifications ==
=== Technical specs ===
The Volkswagen ID. Life concept is built on Volkswagen's MEB platform, designed for electric vehicles. It uses a 57 kWh battery pack and has a front wheel motor, giving a range of 400 km (249 mi) (under the WLTP cycle) and a total output of 172 kW (231 hp). Volkswagen claims the car can accelerate from 0 to 100 km/h (62 mph) in 6.9 seconds. This would be the first application of MEB to a front-drive vehicle.

=== Exterior ===
The ID. Life is finished in a white paint with a black matte retractable roof constructed of textile and plastic material, which is also used on the hood. The front grille and rear tailgate feature Volkswagen's illuminated logo, used on EVs and concept vehicles, as well as squarish-shaped headlights and taillights.

=== Interior ===
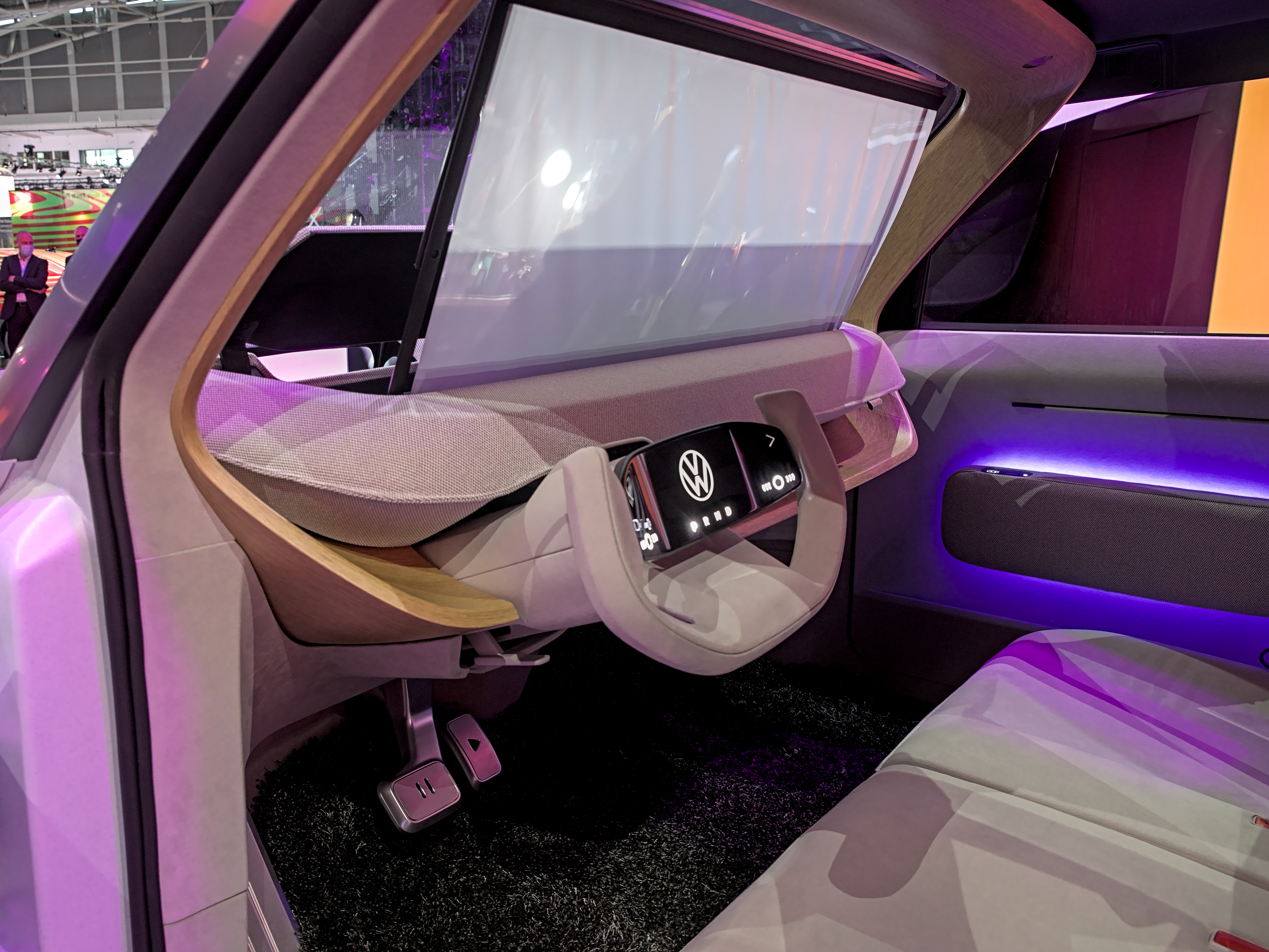
2021 Volkswagen ID. Life at the 2021 International Motor Show Germany (interior)

The interior of the ID. Life concept is made from recycle materials and natural wood and seats four. With the second row seats folded down, the ID. Life has a cargo space of 40.3 cubic feet.

== Production model ==
The Volkswagen ID. Life concept previews a production model that will be released by 2025 as a €20,000 (US$24,000) electric subcompact SUV, likely to be called the Volkswagen ID.2 or the ID.1, positioned under the ID.3 hatchback. It will be based on the same MEB platform used by the concept and all other Volkswagen ID. series EVs.
