= List of Volkswagen Group electric drive units =

The VW Group produces a number of electric axle drive units for use in their battery-electric vehicles. These drive units integrate a variable-frequency drive, traction motor and reduction gearing as well as an output differential (for most units) into a combined unit.

== History ==
Since the 1970s there have been several small-scale runs of electric vehicles produced by VW, such as multiple iterations of the Golf CityStromer, however, these used lead-acid batteries and had short ranges. In the 2000s, a research plug-in hybrid vehicle was built using lithium-ion batteries.

In the early 2010s, two series production electric vehicles were introduced: In 2013, the e-up!, and in 2014 the e-Golf.

Since roughly 2019, Volkswagen has introduced a large number of electric vehicles.

== Models ==
=== Nomenclature used since 2018 ===
Similar to other drivetrain components of the VW Group (for example, their direct-shift gearboxes), the electric axles have descriptive model numbers, which directly encode key specifications of the unit in the model number.

Current nomenclature for VW Group electric axles
Model number		Key	Meaning	Description
1st letter	A	Type of unit	Axle drive (Achsantrieb)	Integrated electronics, motor and gearing package
2nd letter	P	Motor arrangement	Parallel arrangement	Motor sits in parallel with the drive shafts
2nd letter	K	Motor arrangement	Coaxial arrangement (koaxial)	One drive shaft passes through the rotor coaxially
2nd letter	T	Motor arrangement	Twin axle arrangement	Two fully independent motors; no differential. Enables torque steering.
3rd letter	P	Motor type	Permanent magnet motor	Permanent-magnet synchronous electric motor. Typically used as permanently driven rear axle.
3rd letter	A	Motor type	Asynchronous motor	Asynchronous induction motor. Typically used in AWD vehicles for the front axle.
Number	x	Peak torque	xxx Nm peak motor torque	Rounded
Number	x	Peak torque	xxx Nm peak motor torque	Rounded
Number	x	Peak torque	xxx Nm peak motor torque	Rounded

=== Models ===
Model number	Peak torque	Peak power	Power	Models, platforms	Introduction	Notes
EAQ210	210 N⋅m (155 lb⋅ft)	60 kW (82 PS; 80 hp)	40 kW (54 PS; 54 hp)	VW e-up!, Škoda Citigo e iV, Seat Mii electric	2013	According to another press release, the e-Golf motor is called EEM 85 and the gear box is called EQ 270.
EAQ270	270 N⋅m (199 lb⋅ft)/290 N⋅m (214 lb⋅ft)	85 kW (116 PS; 114 hp)/100 kW (136 PS; 134 hp)	50 kW (68 PS; 67 hp)	VW e-Golf	2014	According to another press release, the e-Golf motor is called EEM 85 and the gear box is called EQ 270.
APP290						
APP310	310 N⋅m (229 lb⋅ft)	150 kW (204 PS; 201 hp)	70 kW (95 PS; 94 hp)	VW Group MEB platform		
APP350	350 N⋅m (258 lb⋅ft)	170 kW (231 PS; 228 hp)		VW ID.3 Neo	2026	
APP550	545 N⋅m (402 lb⋅ft)/560 N⋅m (413 lb⋅ft)	210 kW (286 PS; 282 hp)/240 kW (326 PS; 322 hp)		MEB (VW GTX, Škoda RS , ID.7)		
AKA150	134 N⋅m (99 lb⋅ft)	80 kW (109 PS; 107 hp)		MEB		Front-axle drive in AWD models
APA250	247 N⋅m (182 lb⋅ft)	125 kW (170 PS; 168 hp)		Audi e-tron		Modular concept with single electronics package, two different motors (250/320 Nm) and three different gear/differential packages (parallel, coaxial, twin).
APA320	314 N⋅m (232 lb⋅ft)	129 kW (175 PS; 173 hp)		Audi e-tron		Modular concept with single electronics package, two different motors (250/320 Nm) and three different gear/differential packages (parallel, coaxial, twin).
AKA320	314 N⋅m (232 lb⋅ft)	140 kW (190 PS; 188 hp)		Audi e-tron		Modular concept with single electronics package, two different motors (250/320 Nm) and three different gear/differential packages (parallel, coaxial, twin).
ATA250	2x 247 N⋅m (182 lb⋅ft)	2x 102 kW (139 PS; 137 hp)		Audi e-tron		Modular concept with single electronics package, two different motors (250/320 Nm) and three different gear/differential packages (parallel, coaxial, twin).
