= Volkswagen ID. Buggy =

Volkswagen concept vehicle

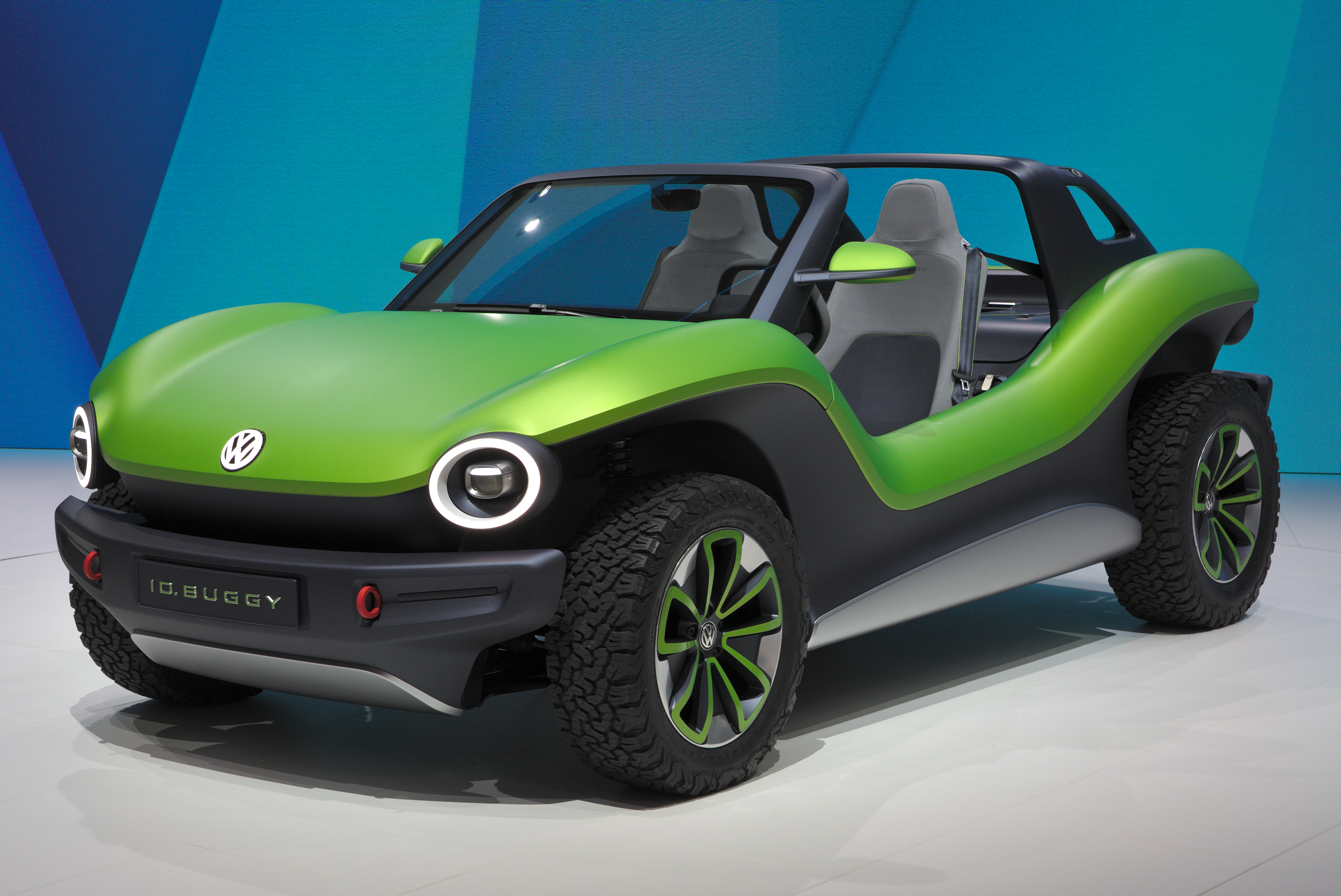
- 2019 Volkswagen ID. Buggy at the Geneva International Motor Show (front)

Overview
- Manufacturer: Volkswagen
- Production: 2019
- Designer: Björn Hackbarth

Body and chassis
- Class: Dune buggy
- Body style: 2-seat dune buggy
- Layout: Dual-motors, 4WD
- Platform: Volkswagen MEB platform

Powertrain
- Electric motor: Permanent Magnet Motors
- Battery: 62 kWh lithium-ion battery

Dimensions
- Wheelbase: 2,649 mm (104.3 in)
- Length: 4,064 mm (160.0 in)

The Volkswagen ID. Buggy is an electric dune buggy concept revealed by German automobile manufacturer Volkswagen at the 2019 Geneva International Motor Show.

== Overview ==
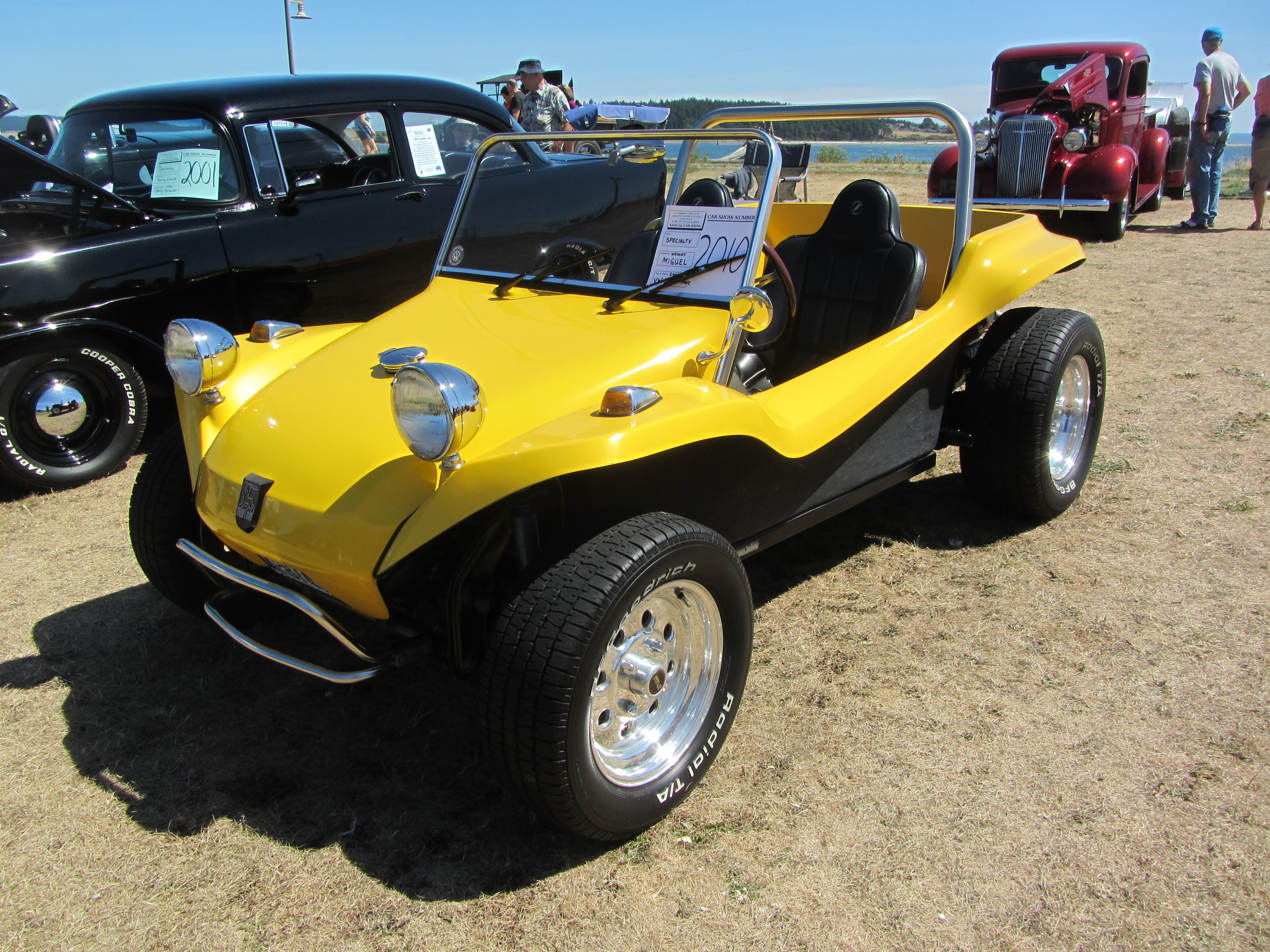
Volkswagen Beetle-based dune buggies such as the Meyers Manx are the basis for inspiration of the Volkswagen ID. Buggy concept.

The Volkswagen ID. Buggy concept was revealed at the Geneva International Motor Show on March 7, 2019 in Geneva, Switzerland. It is a retro-styled 2-seat, roofless, and doorless electric dune buggy, inspired by other Volkswagen Beetle-based dune buggies from the 1960s such as the Meyers Manx. The ID. Buggy was designed by Volkswagen's head designer Klaus Zyciora.

== Specifications ==
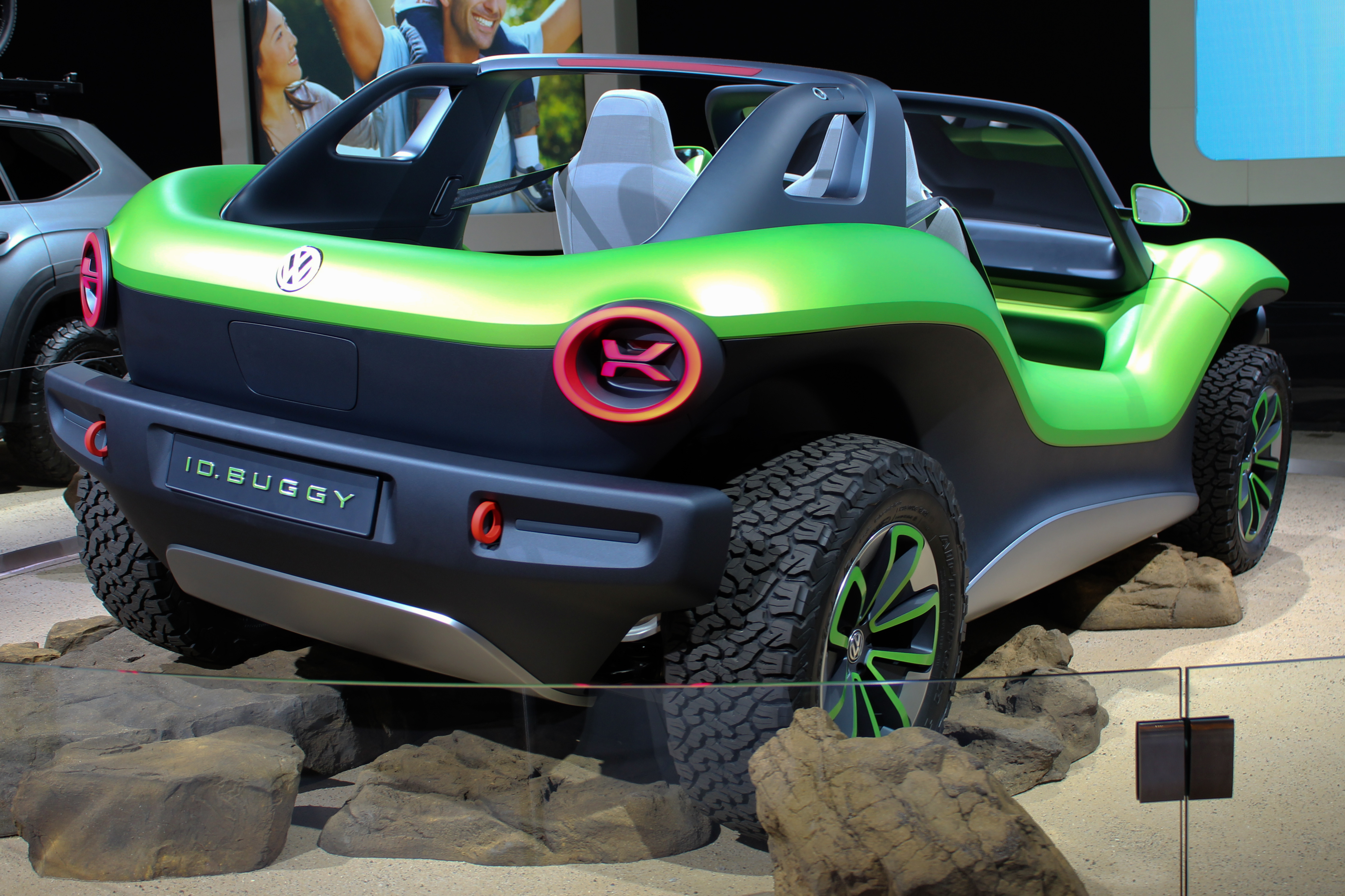
2019 Volkswagen ID. Buggy at the 2019 New York International Auto Show (rear)

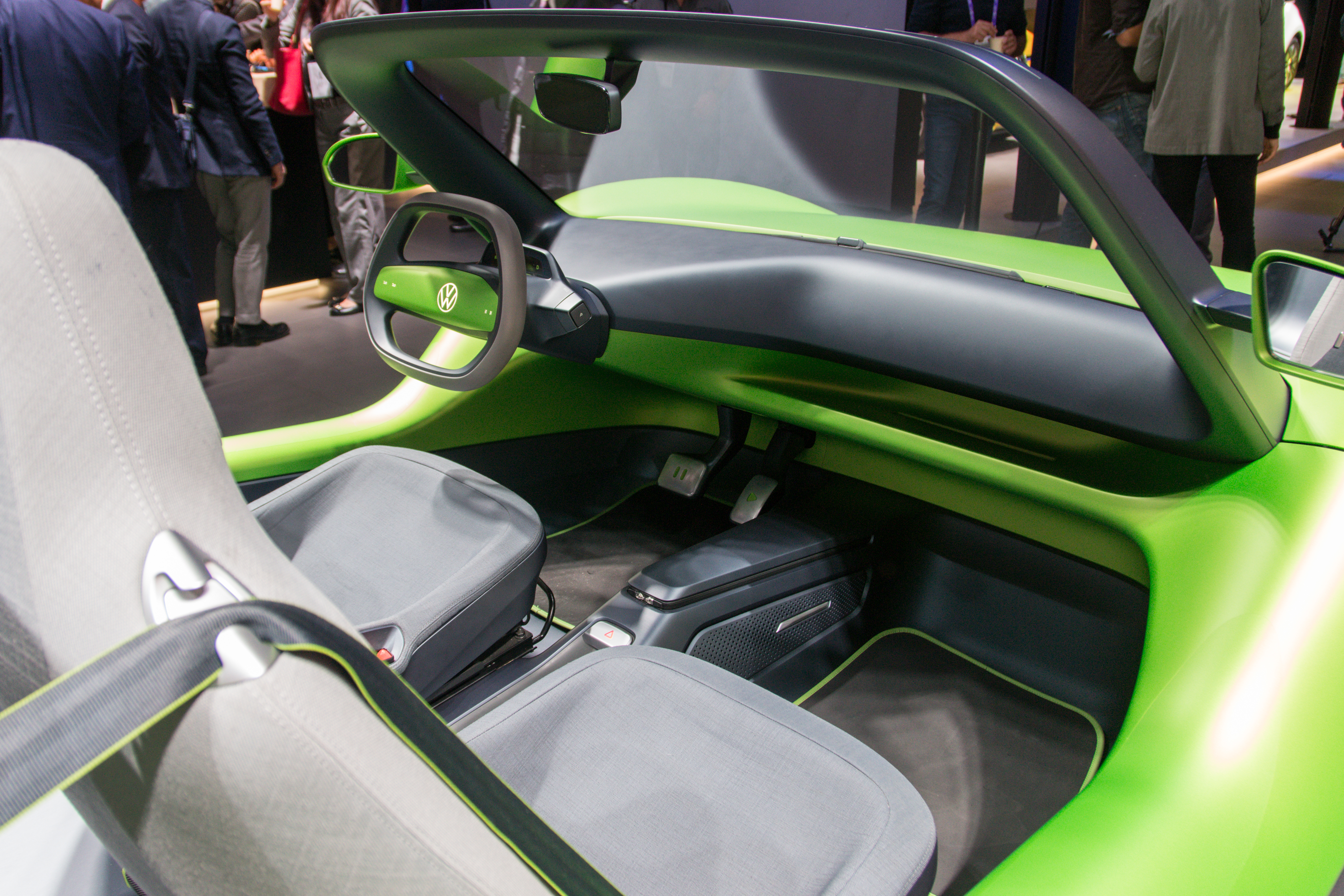
2019 Volkswagen ID. Buggy at the 2019 International Motor Show Germany (interior)

=== Technical specifications ===
The Volkswagen ID. Buggy concept is built on Volkswagen's MEB platform for electric vehicles. It uses a 62 kWh lithium-ion battery pack and two axle-mounted motors with a total output of 201 horsepower, 250 lb⋅ft (340 N⋅m) of torque, and a 0-60 mph (97 km/h) time of 7.2 seconds. The ID. Buggy has an estimated Worldwide Harmonised Light Vehicles Test Procedure range of 155 mi (249 km). The ID. Buggy has a flat aluminum unibody and 9.4 in (240 mm) of ground clearance.

=== Exterior ===
The Volkswagen ID. Buggy, designed for off-roading, is finished in a waterproof fern green paint, uses 18-inch rims with BF Goodrich All-Terrain TA tires, a rear targa bar, and two steel tow hooks on the front and rear bumpers for the event the vehicle gets stuck in mud or sand.

=== Interior ===
The interior of the Volkswagen ID. Buggy has two seats and—like its exterior—is waterproof, as the vehicle lacks both a roof and doors.
