= Volkswagen Group MEB platform =

Modular electric car platform

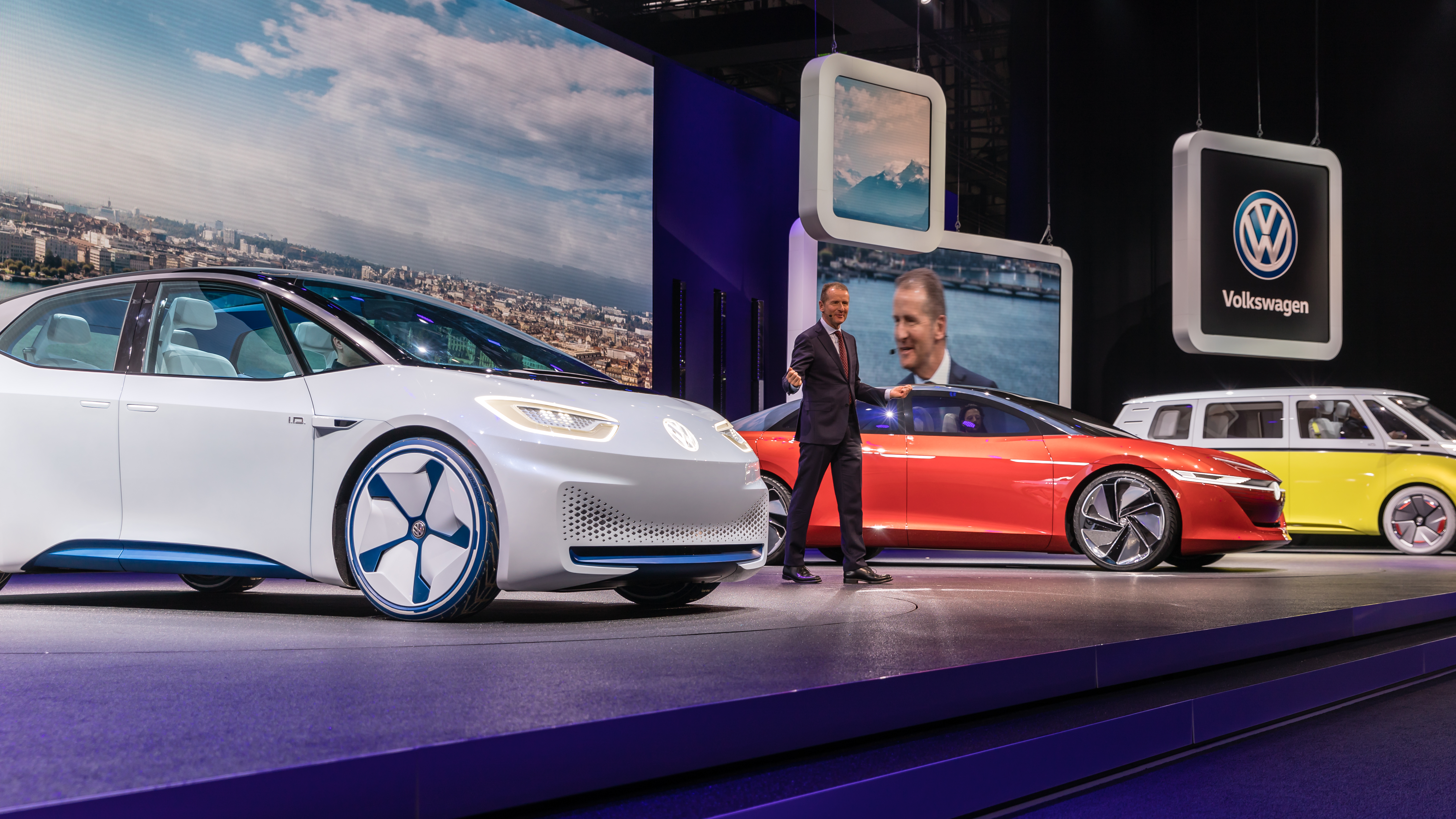
- Herbert Diess presents the ID. line-up based on the MEB platform

Overview
- Manufacturer: Volkswagen Group
- Production: 2019–present

Body and chassis
- Layout: Front-motor, front-wheel-drive (MEB.Entry); Rear-motor, rear-wheel-drive; Dual-motor, all-wheel-drive
- Related: MQB Evo platform PPE platform

The Volkswagen Group MEB platform (German: Modularer E-Antriebs Baukasten, lit. 'modular electric-drive toolkit') is a modular car platform for electric cars developed by the Volkswagen Group and its subsidiaries.

It is used in models of Audi, Cupra, Škoda, and Volkswagen, along with Ford through partnership. The architecture is aimed to "consolidate electronic controls and reduce the number of microprocessors, advance the application of new driver-assistance technology and somewhat alter the way cars are built" by the VW Group.

== History and development ==
MEB was developed as part of Volkswagen Group's electrification strategy. In 2017, the Group announced its "Roadmap E" programme, which set a target of offering a battery-electric or hybrid version of each of its approximately 300 models by 2030.

In March 2018, Volkswagen announced that 16 production sites would be equipped to manufacture electric vehicles by the end of 2022. By May, it had awarded battery-supply contracts worth approximately €40 billion. In September, Volkswagen Commercial Vehicles unveiled the MEB-based ID. Buzz Cargo concept.

Volkswagen opened MEB to other manufacturers in March 2019, seeking to reduce costs through economies of scale. Series production of the Volkswagen ID.3 started at the Zwickau plant in Germany on 4 November 2019. During 2020, MEB vehicle production expanded to Anting and Foshan in China. Škoda started building the Enyaq at Mladá Boleslav in the Czech Republic on 25 November that year.

The ID. Life concept, unveiled in September 2021, used a smaller MEB variant with front-wheel drive. Škoda began manufacturing MEB battery systems at Mladá Boleslav in May 2022. Volkswagen's Chattanooga plant in Tennessee began assembling the ID.4 in July 2022.

Volkswagen announced MEB+ in December 2022, with plans for faster charging and increased range. In 2023, it presented the ID.2all concept, which used the front-wheel-drive MEB Entry platform.

In September 2025, Volkswagen Group announced that the Cupra Raval, Škoda Epiq, Volkswagen ID. Polo and Volkswagen ID. Cross would use MEB+ as members of its Electric Urban Car Family. The Raval and ID. Polo entered production at Martorell, Spain, in June 2026. Epiq production also started that month at Volkswagen Navarra's plant in Pamplona.

== Technical specifications ==
Volkswagen developed MEB specifically for electric cars, rather than adapting a platform shared with petrol and diesel models, as it had done with the e-Golf. The e-Golf's battery modules were fitted into several spaces beneath the floor, while MEB uses a large, flat battery pack between the axles. This allows for a longer wheelbase and more interior space.

MEB uses a 400-volt electrical system and the original battery packs contained lithium-ion cells grouped into modules inside a protective aluminium housing. The early Volkswagen ID.3 battery had 12 modules, each containing 24 cells. The system supported AC charging at up to 11 kW and DC fast charging at up to 125 kW.

The MEB+ introduced in 2026 added front-wheel drive for smaller cars such as the Volkswagen ID. Polo, alongside new electric motors and battery technology. The new batteries use cell-to-pack construction, removing the need for separate module housings. They are available with lithium iron phosphate (LFP) and nickel manganese cobalt (NMC) chemistry.

== Models ==
=== MEB ===
As of 2026, the MEB platform underpins nine core models, with eight of them in active production, resulting in a total of 13 different vehicles.

(Sub-bullets indicate rebadged versions or derivatives of the same vehicle, e.g., coupe or cargo)

- Audi A2 e-tron (2026–present)
- Audi Q4 e-tron (2021–present)
  - Audi Q4 Sportback e-tron (2021–present)
- Audi Q5 e-tron (2021–present)
- Cupra Born (2021–present)
- Cupra Tavascan (2023–present)
  - Volkswagen ID. Unyx 06 (2024–present)
- Ford Explorer EV (2024–present)
- Ford Capri EV (2024–present)
- Škoda Elroq (2025–present)
- Škoda Enyaq (2020–present)
  - Škoda Enyaq Coupé (2022–present)
- Volkswagen ID.3 (2019–present)
- Volkswagen ID.4 (2020–present)
  - Volkswagen ID.5 (2021–present)
- Volkswagen ID.6 (2021–present)
- Volkswagen ID.7 (2023–present)
  - Volkswagen ID.7 Tourer (2024–present)
  - Volkswagen ID. Unyx 07 (2026–present)
- Volkswagen ID. Buzz (2022–present)
  - Volkswagen ID. Buzz Cargo (2022–present)
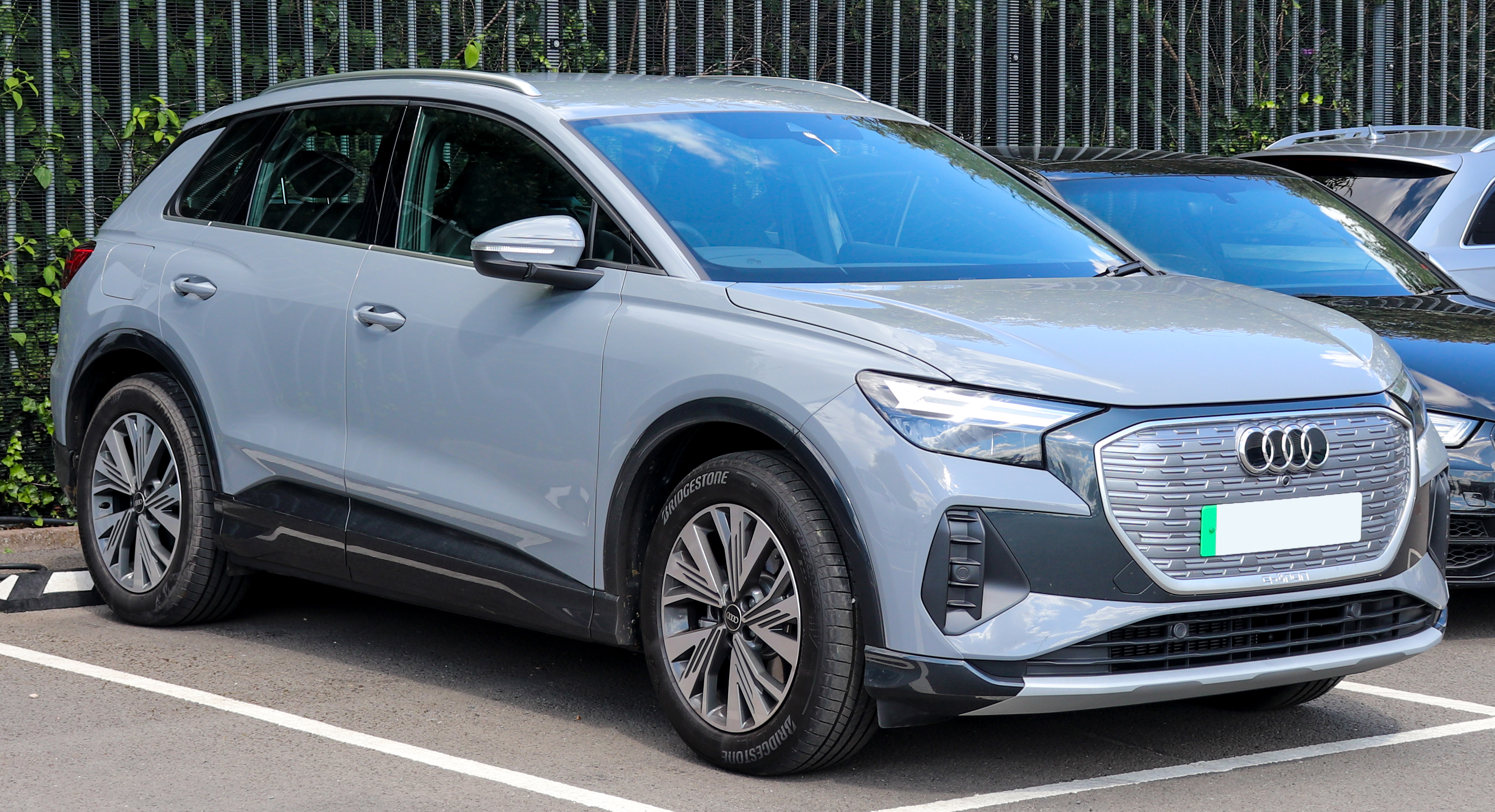
Audi Q4 e-tron

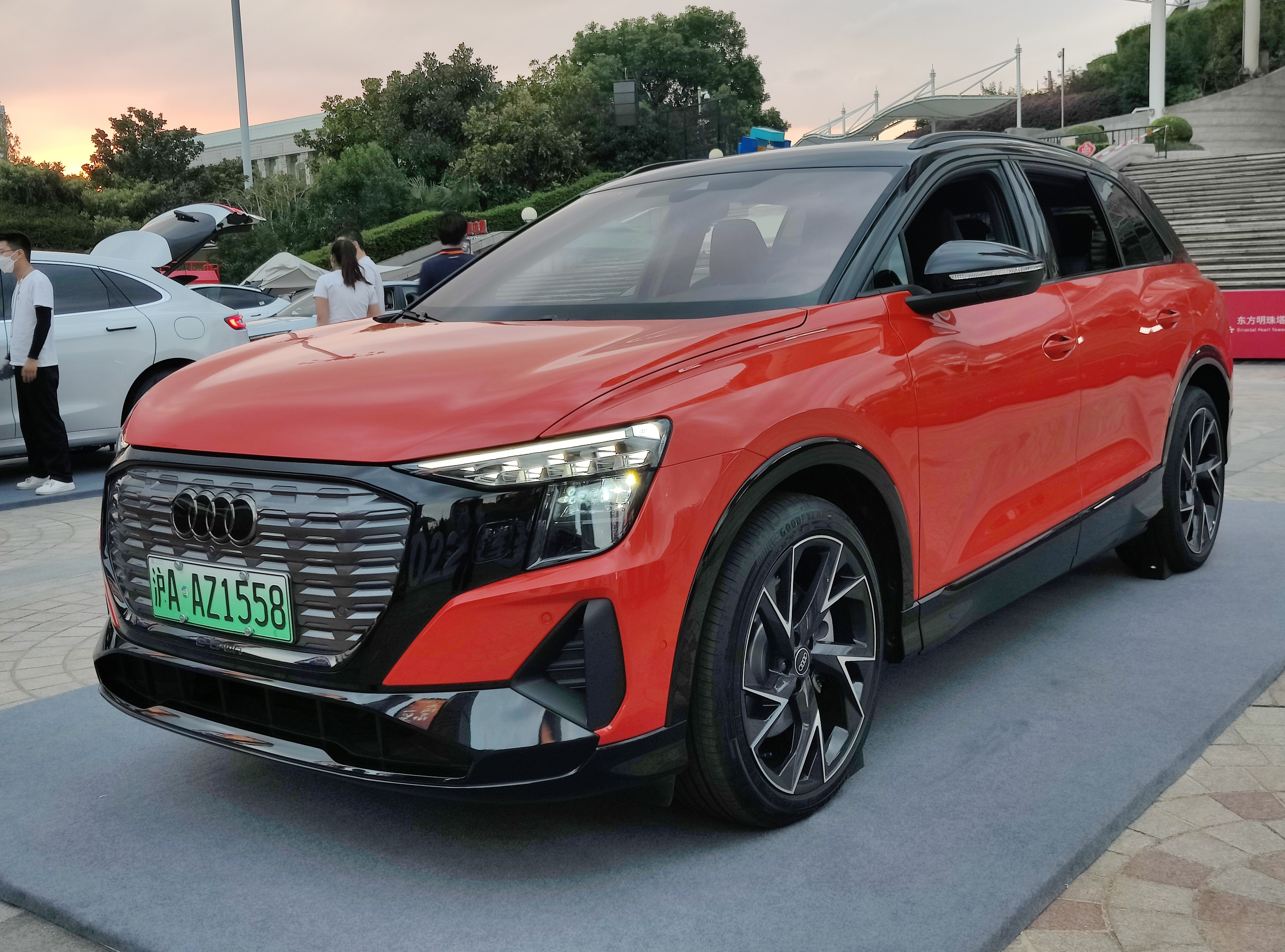
Audi Q5 e-tron

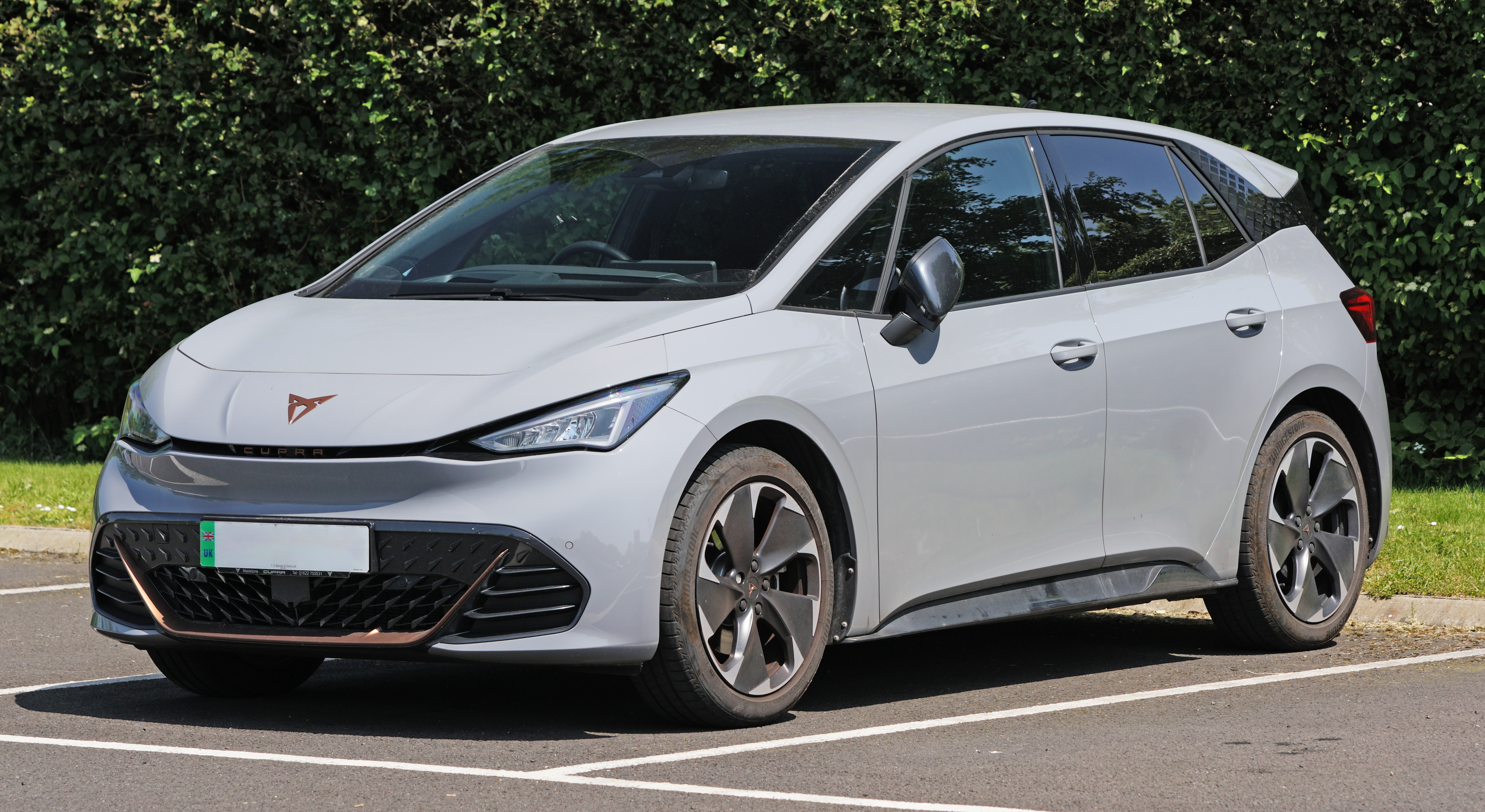
Cupra Born

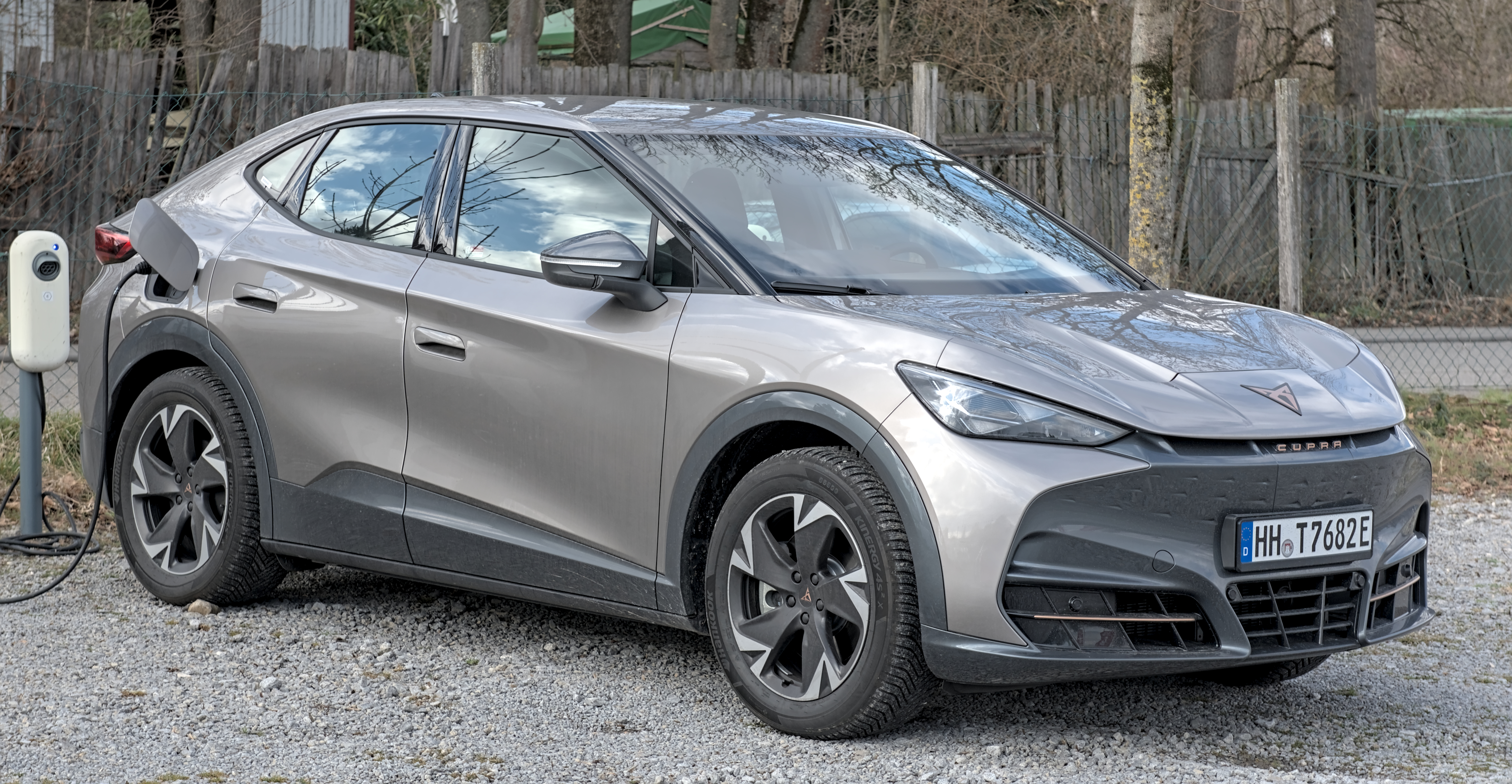
Cupra Tavascan

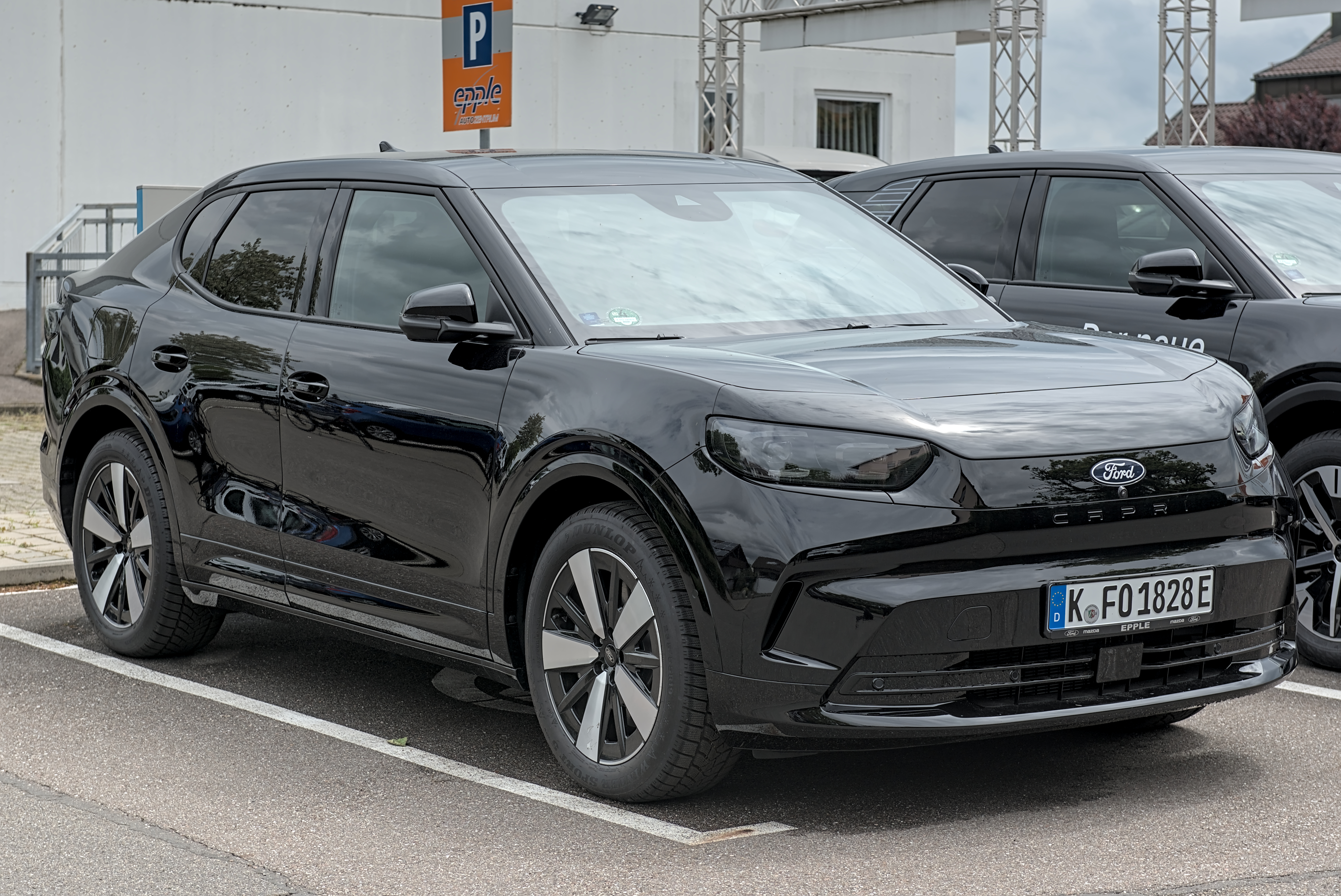
Ford Capri EV

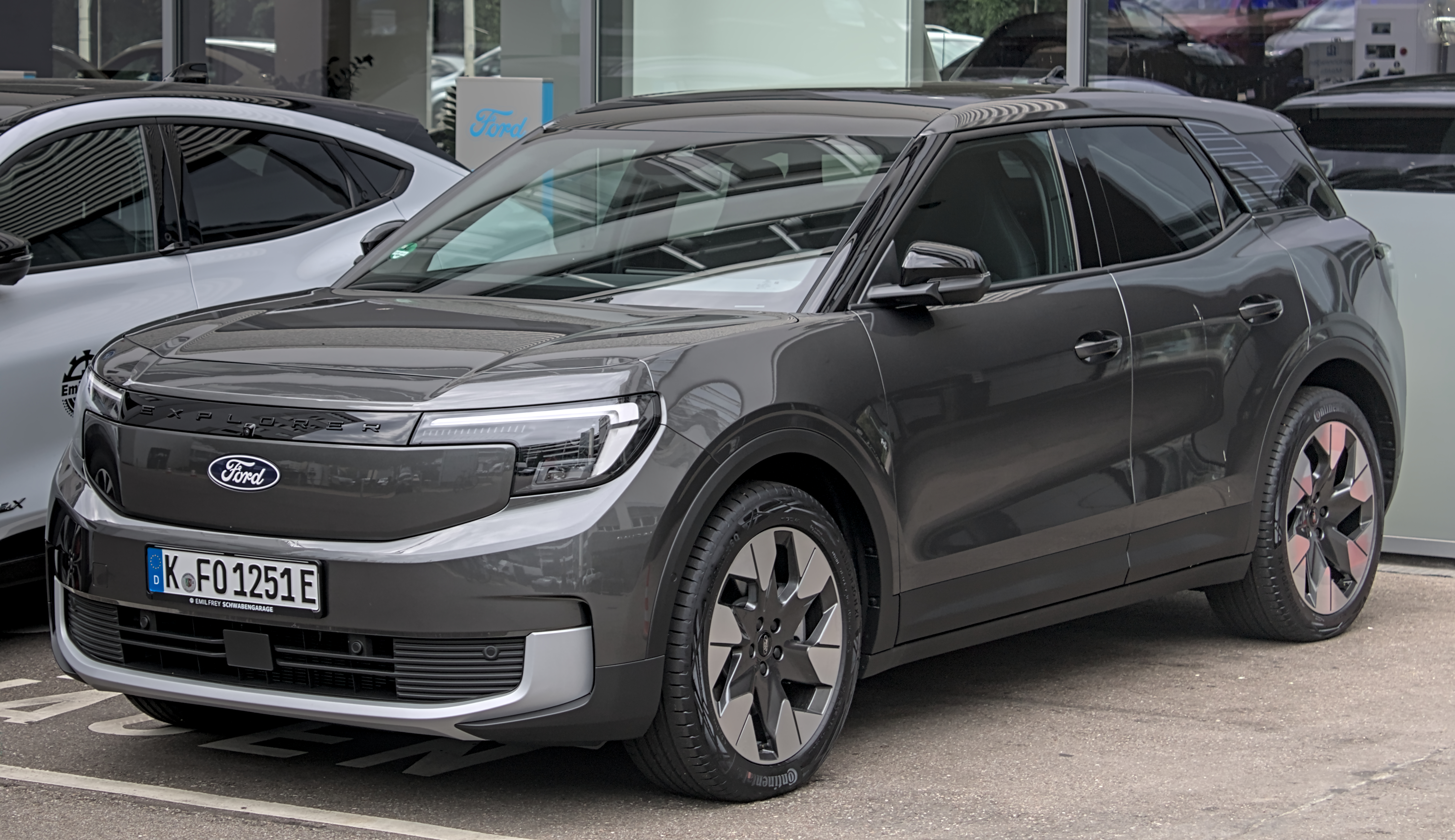
Ford Explorer EV

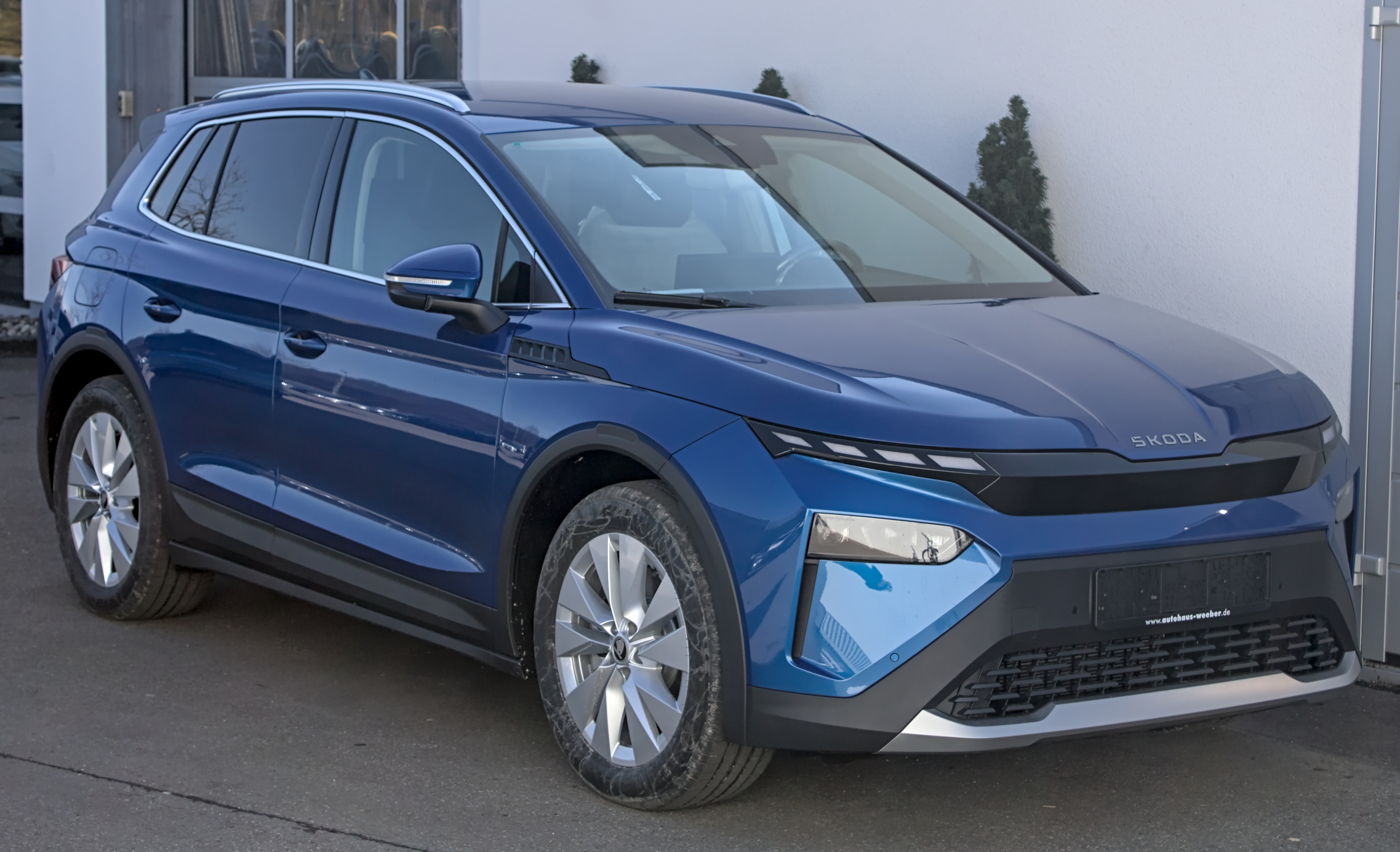
Škoda Elroq

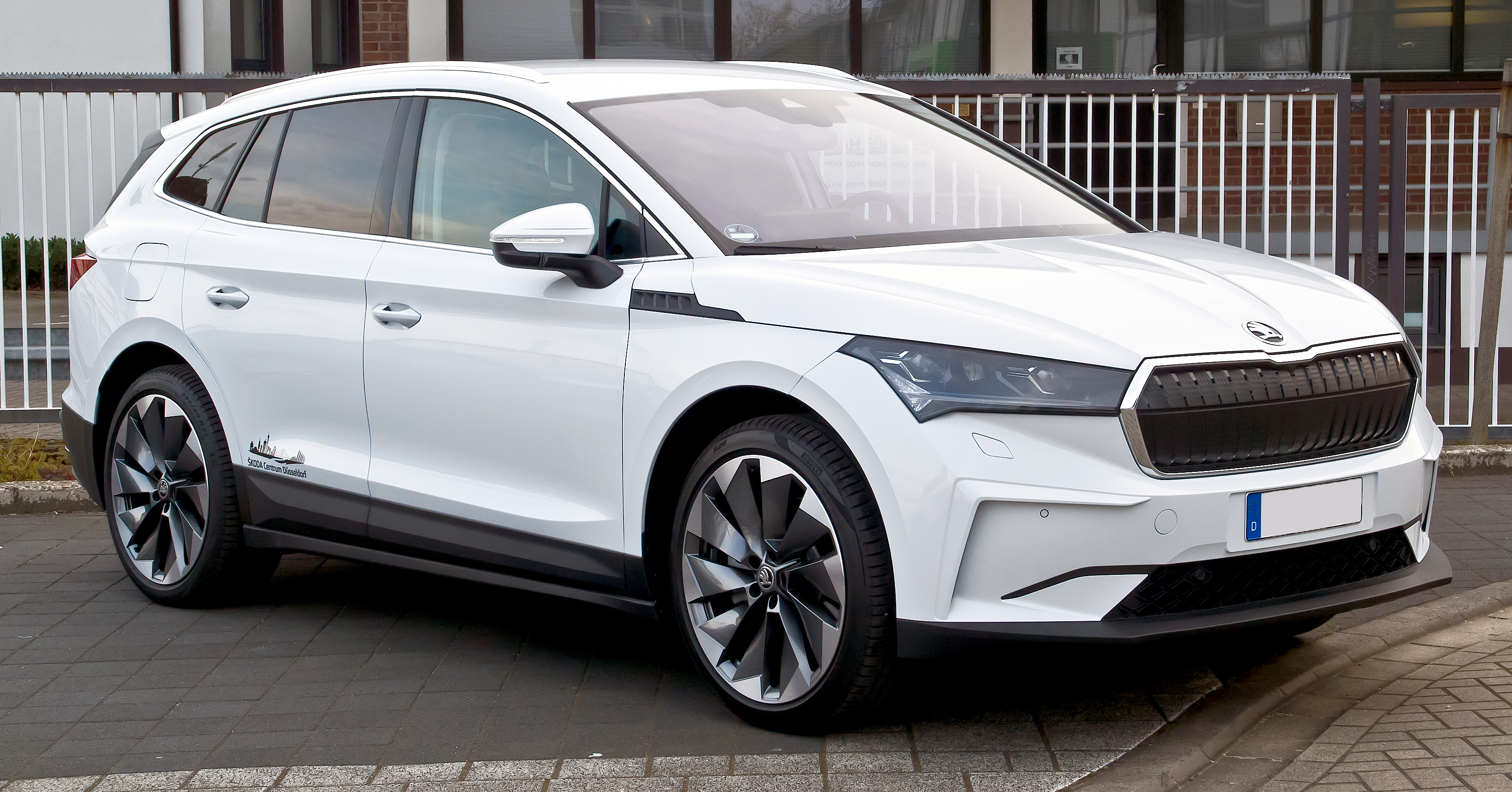
Škoda Enyaq

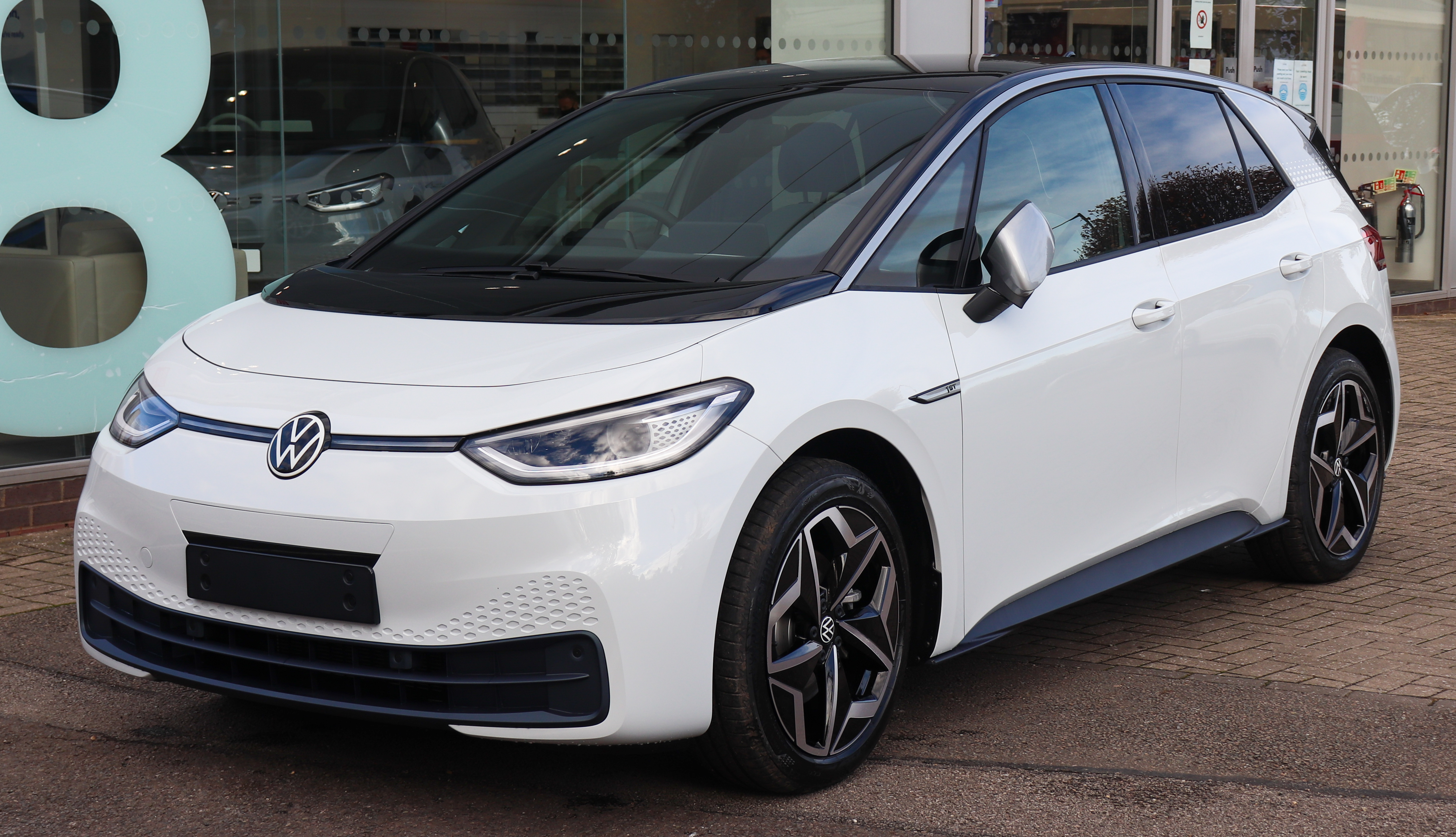
Volkswagen ID.3

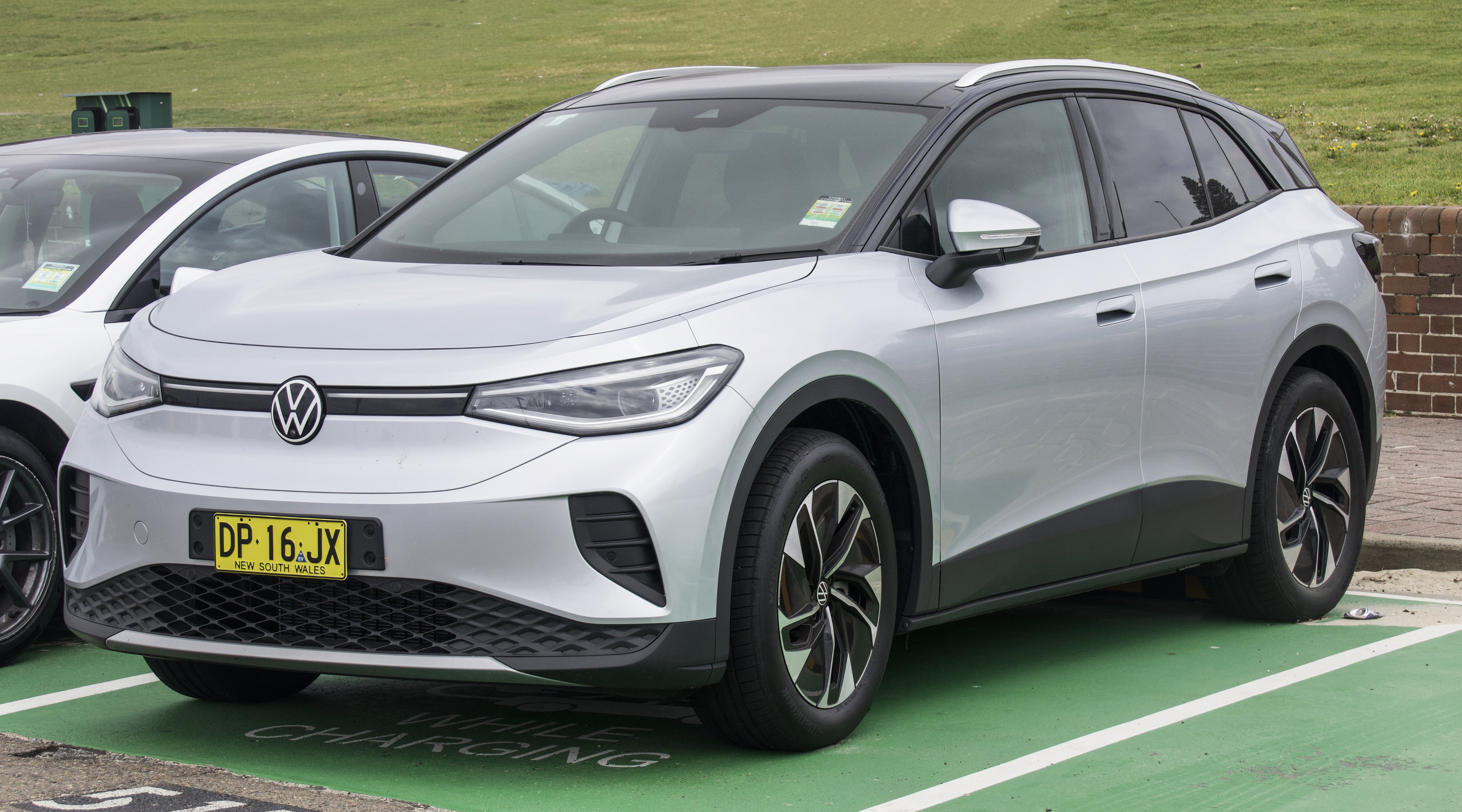
Volkswagen ID.4

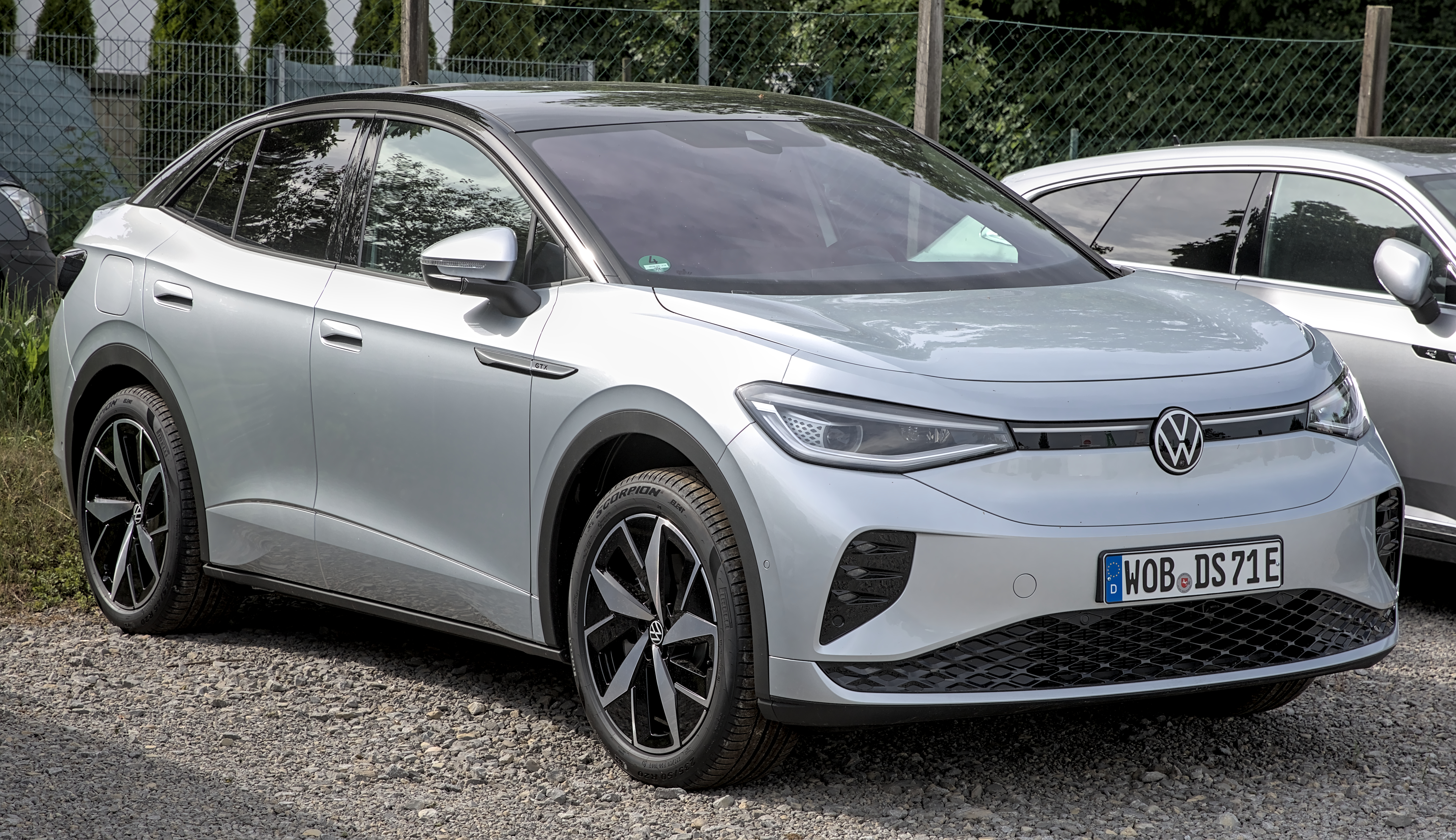
Volkswagen ID.5

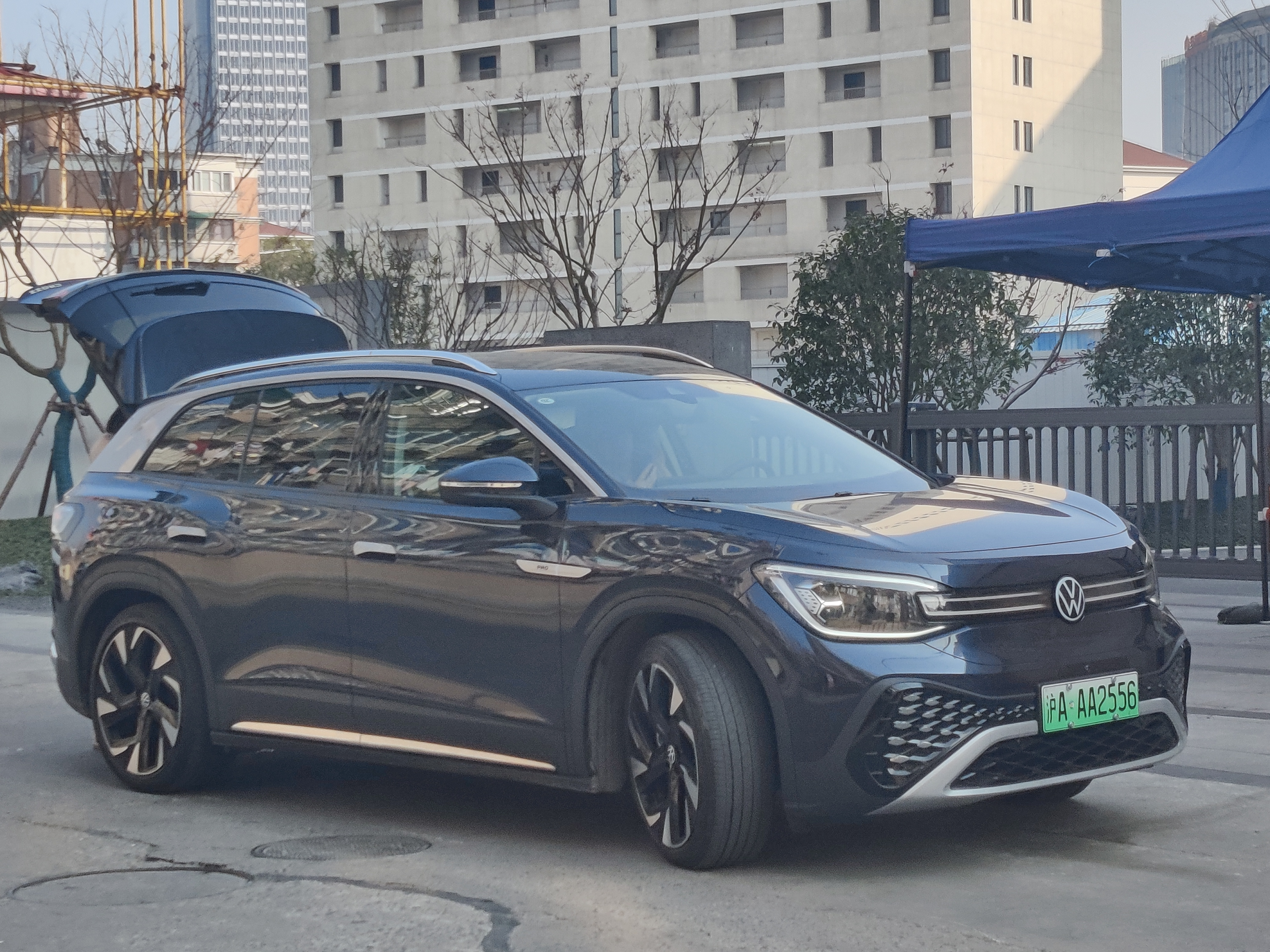
Volkswagen ID.6

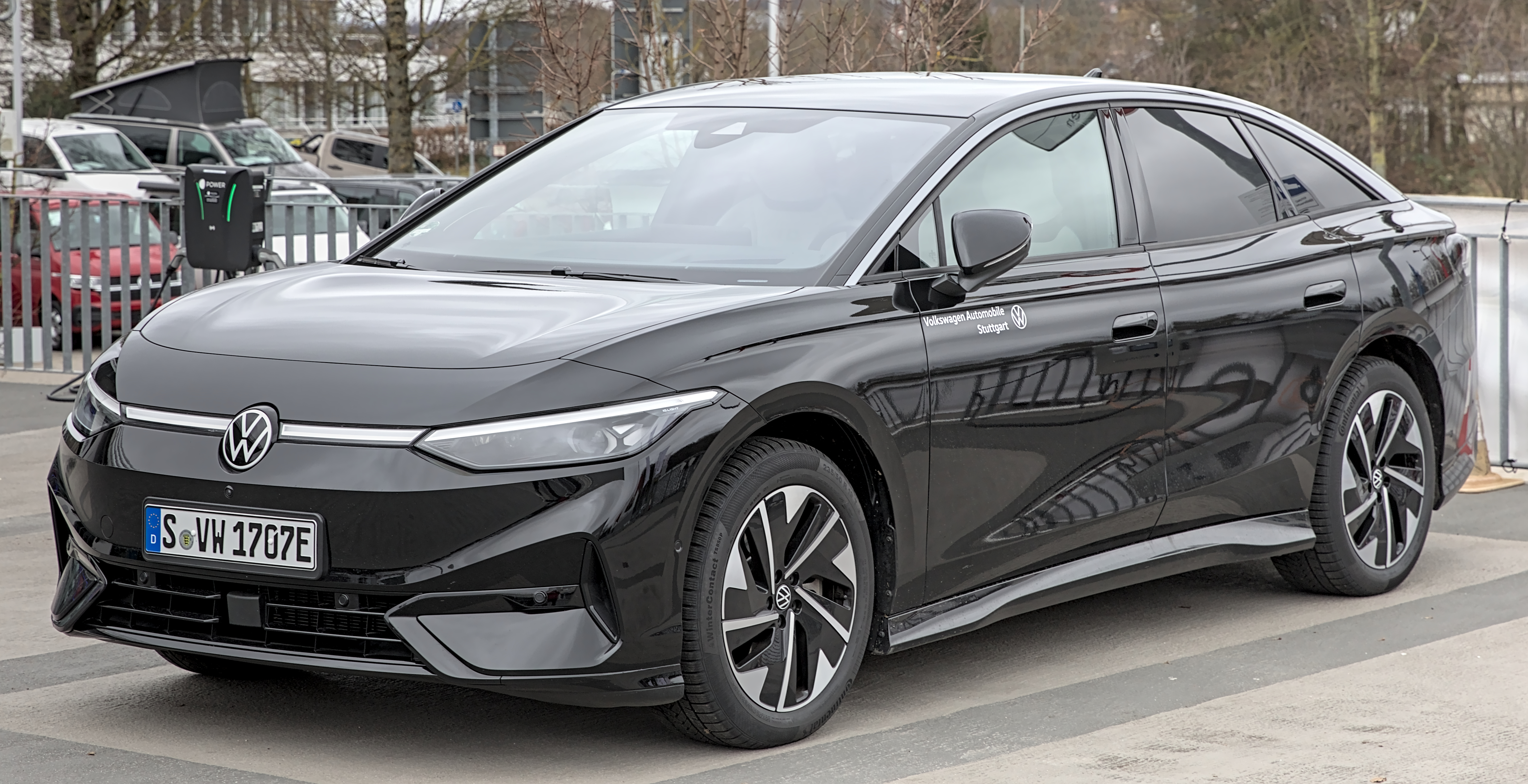
Volkswagen ID. 7

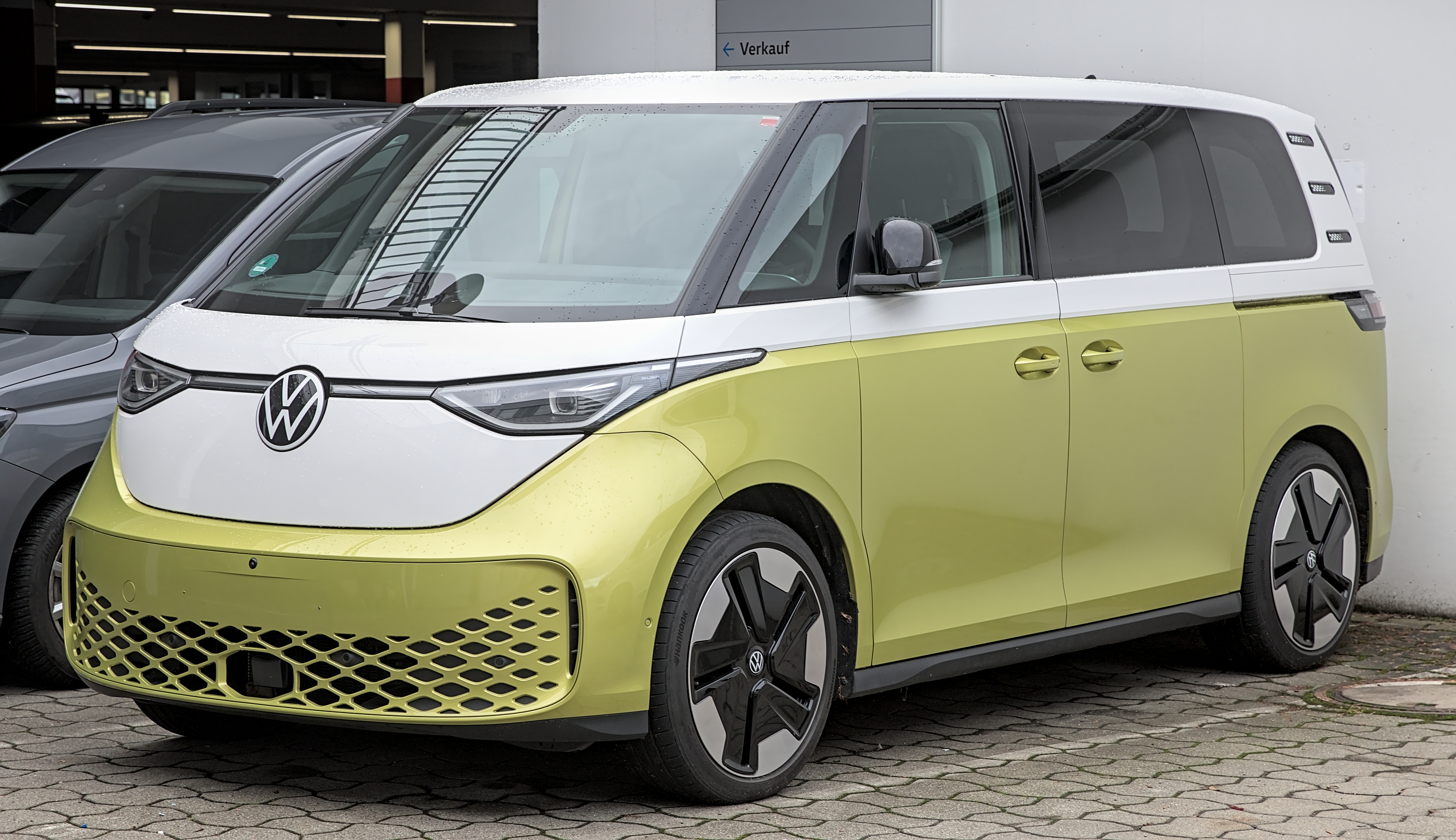
Volkswagen ID. Buzz

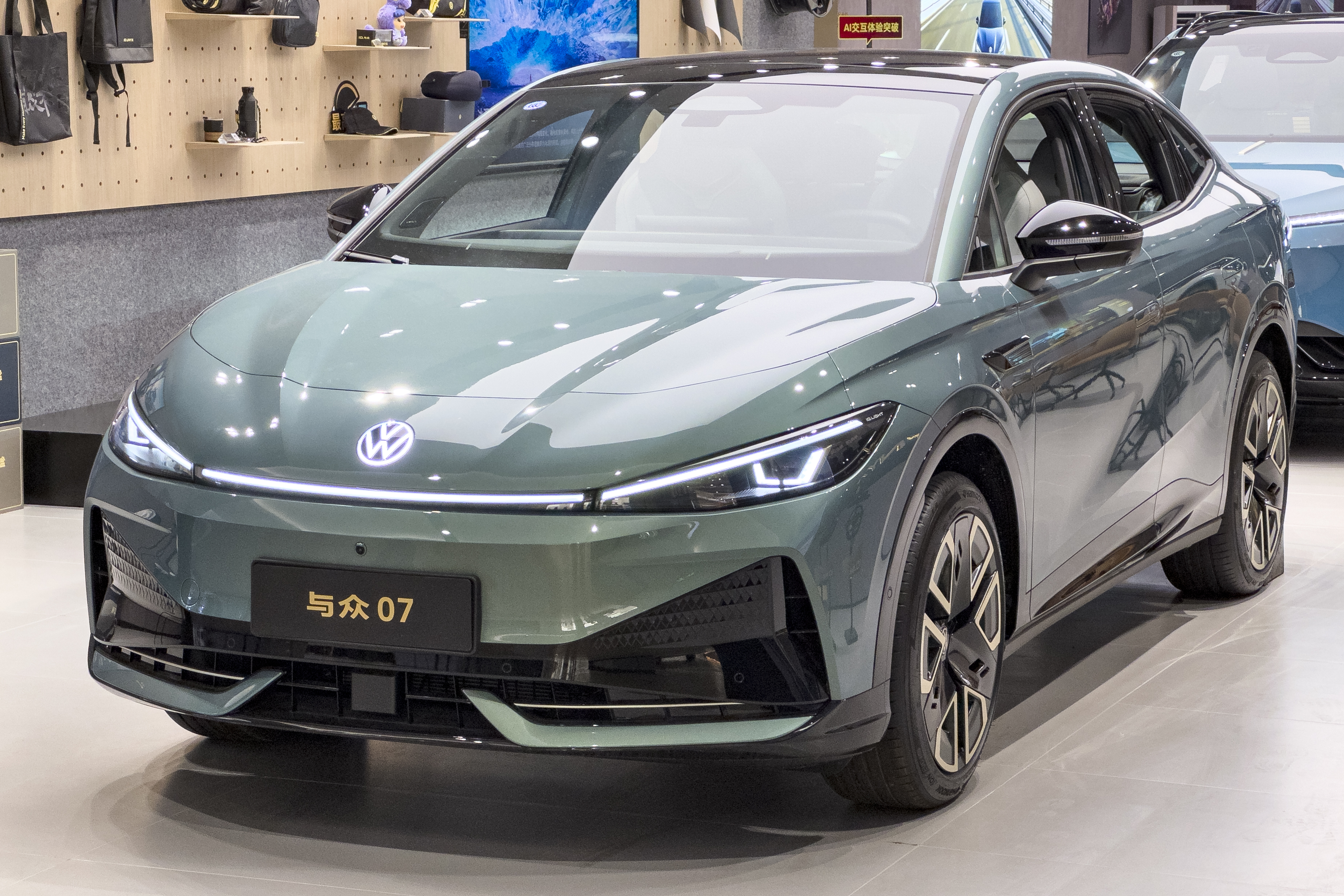
Volkswagen ID. Unyx 07

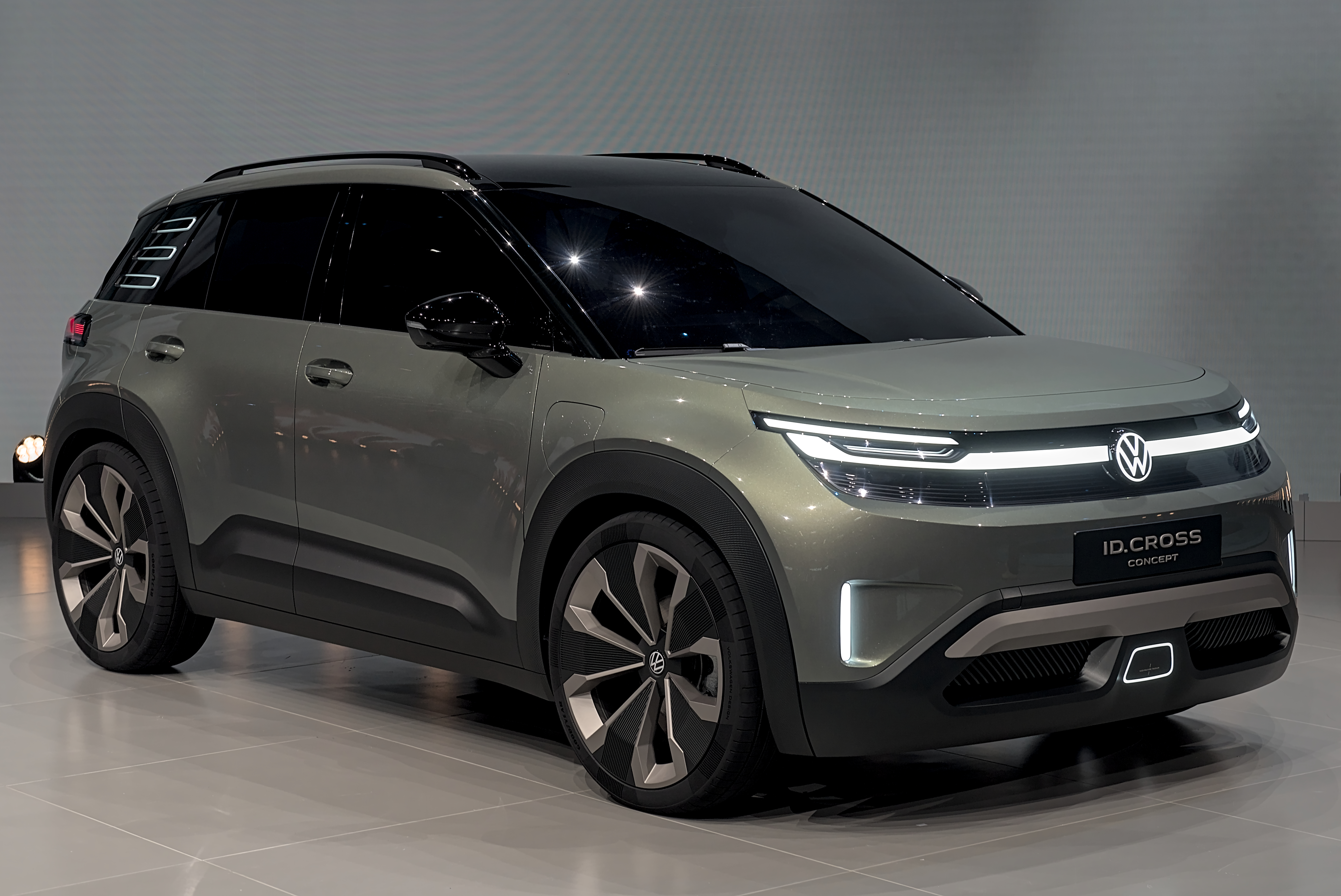
Volkswagen ID. Cross

=== MEB+ ===
- Cupra Raval (2026–present)
- Škoda Epiq (2026–present)
- Škoda Peaq (2026–present)
- Volkswagen ID. Tiguan (2026-present)
Škoda Peaq

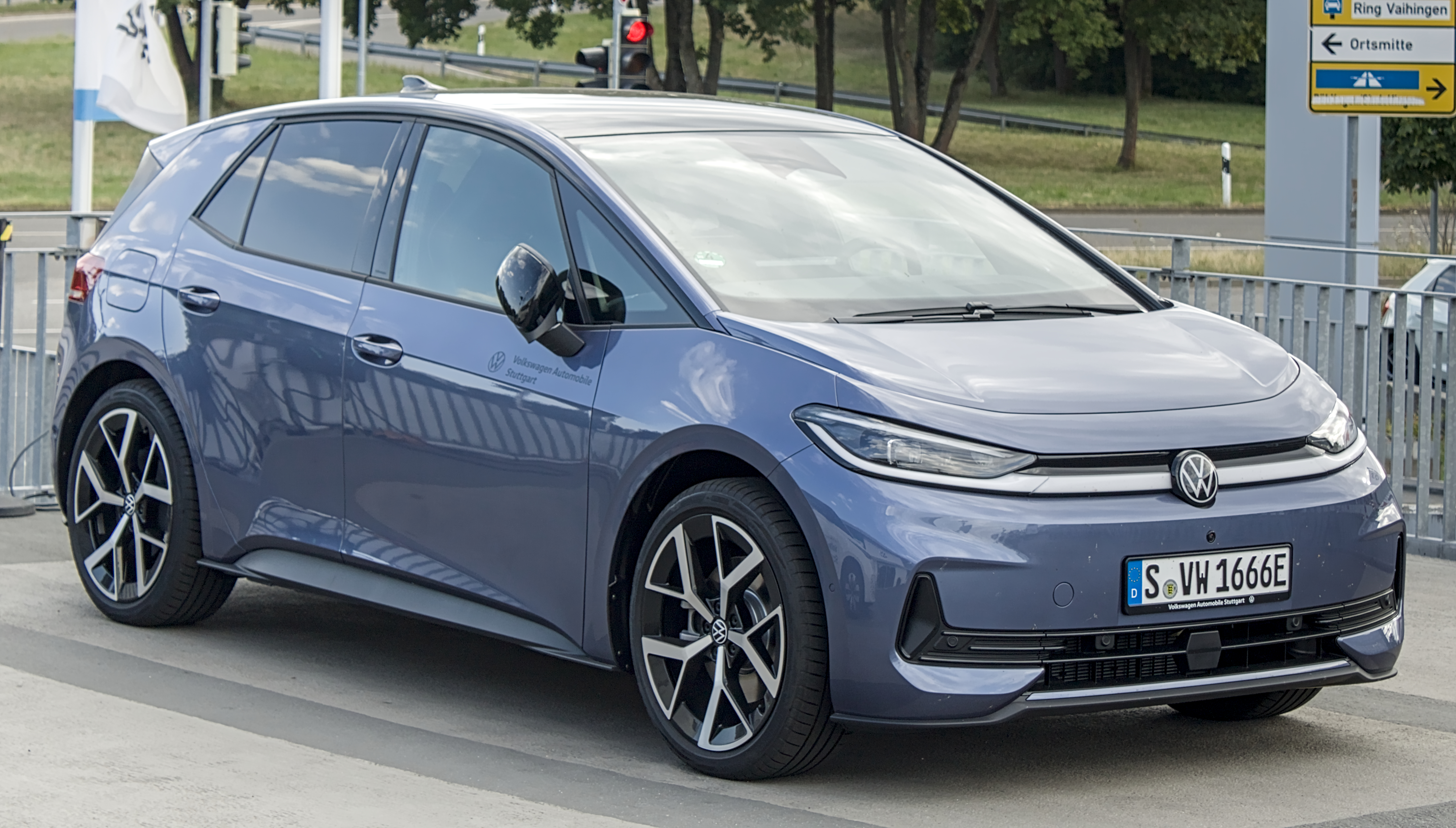
Volkswagen ID.3 Neo
- Volkswagen ID. Polo (2026–present)
- Volkswagen ID. Cross (2026–present)
Cupra Raval

Škoda Epiq

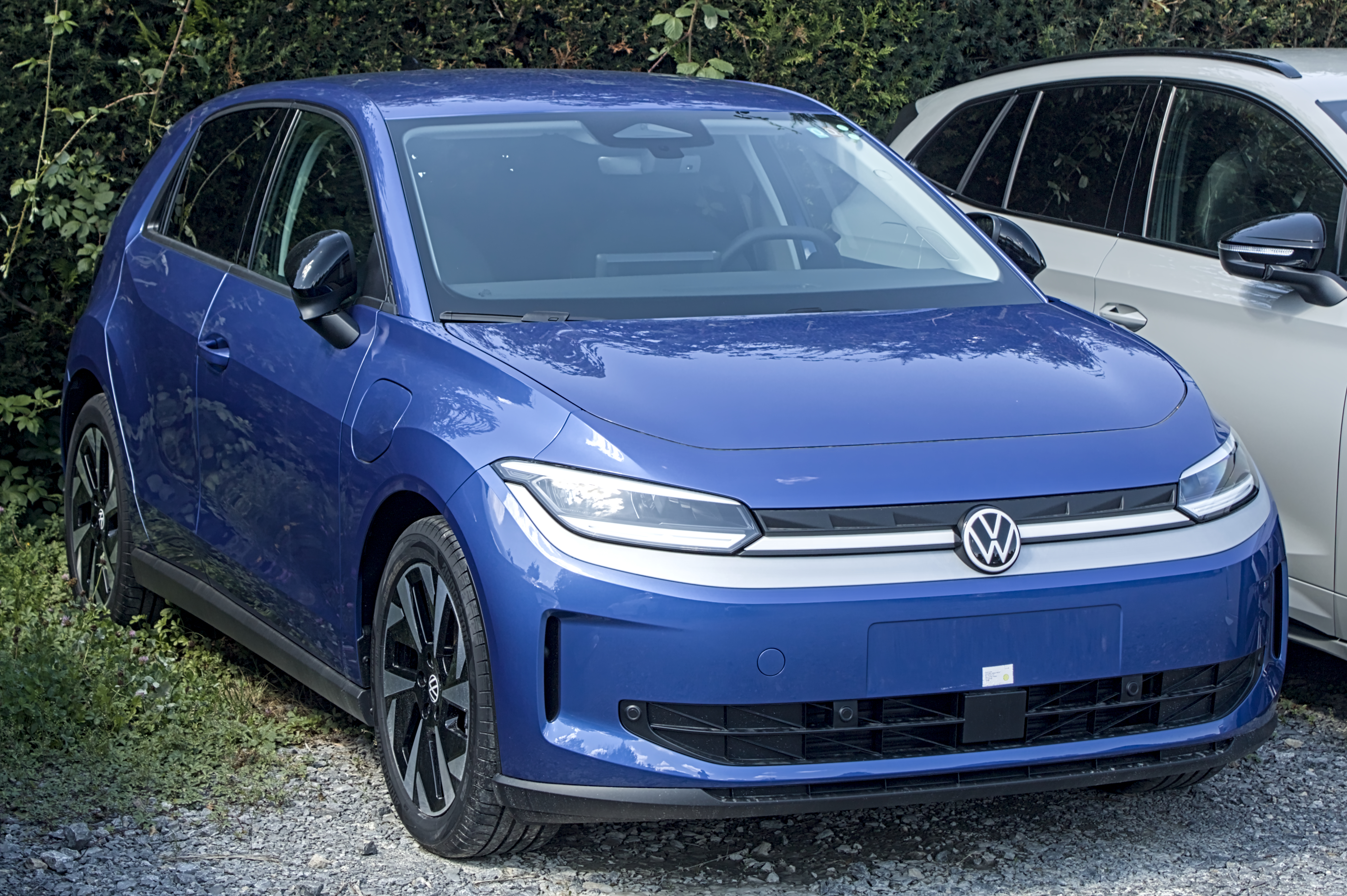
Volkswagen ID. Polo

Volkswagen ID. Cross

=== Concept vehicles ===
- Volkswagen ID. Buggy
- Volkswagen ID. Life
- Volkswagen ID.2all/ID.GTI
- Volkswagen ID.Every1
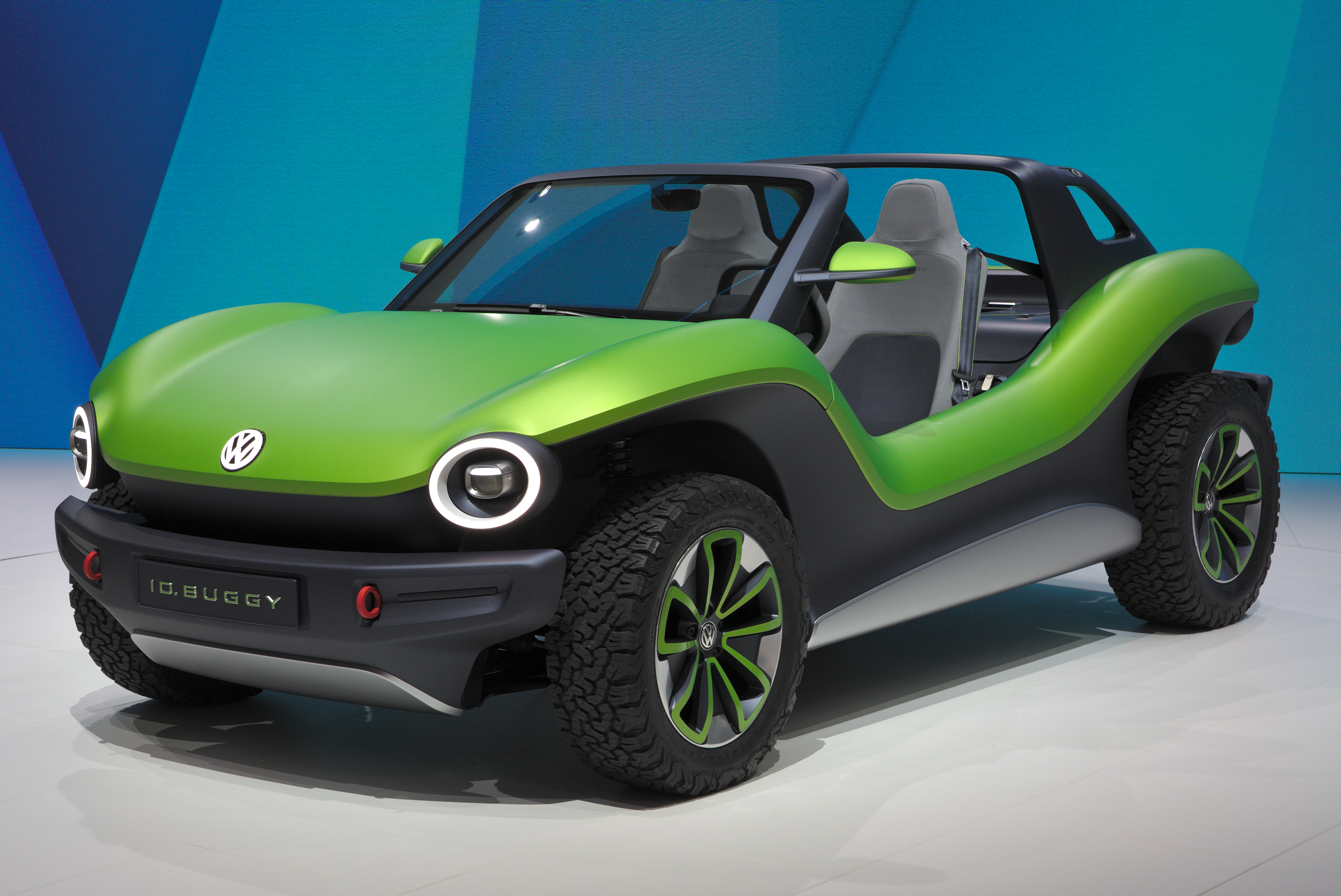
Volkswagen ID. Buggy

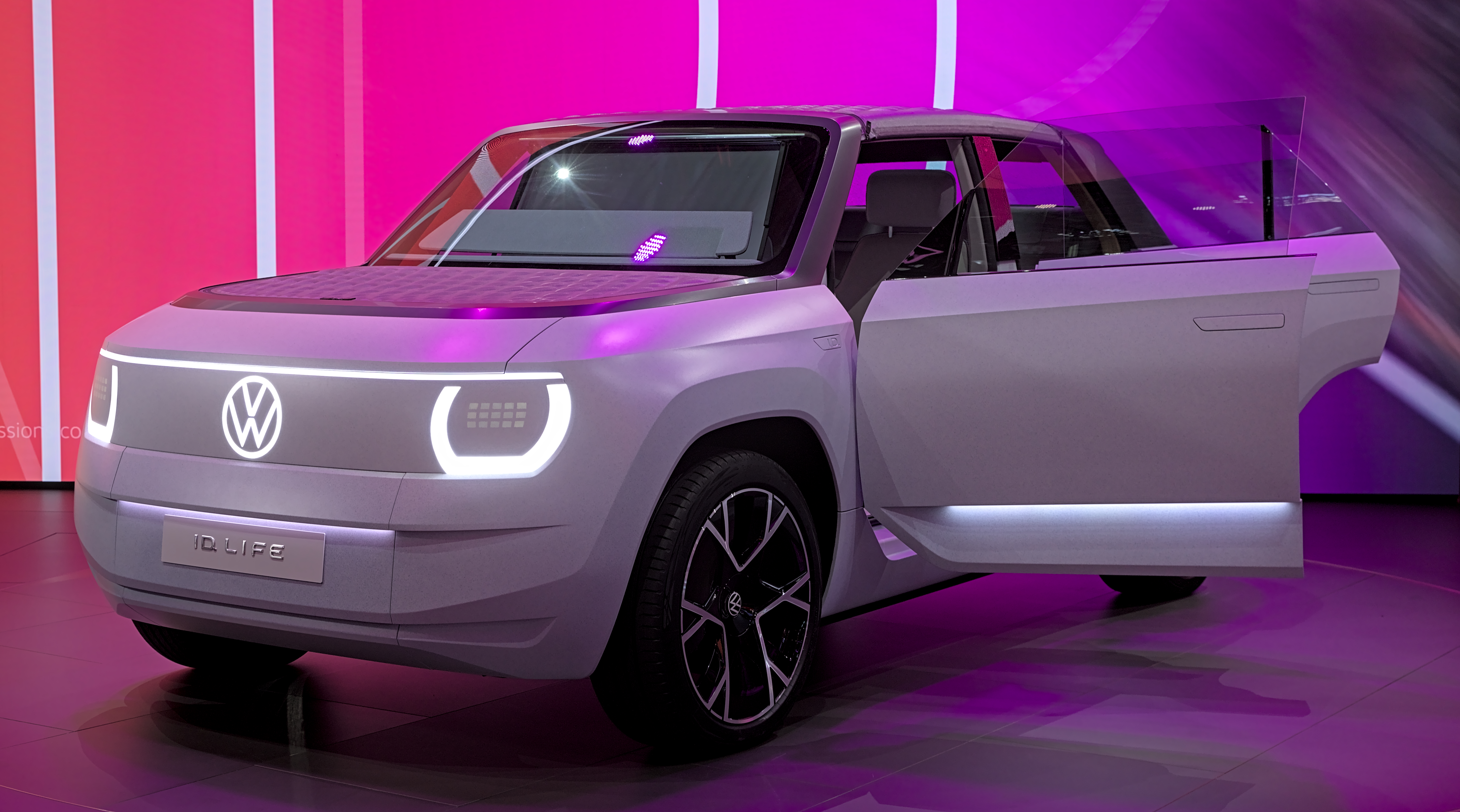
Volkswagen ID. Life

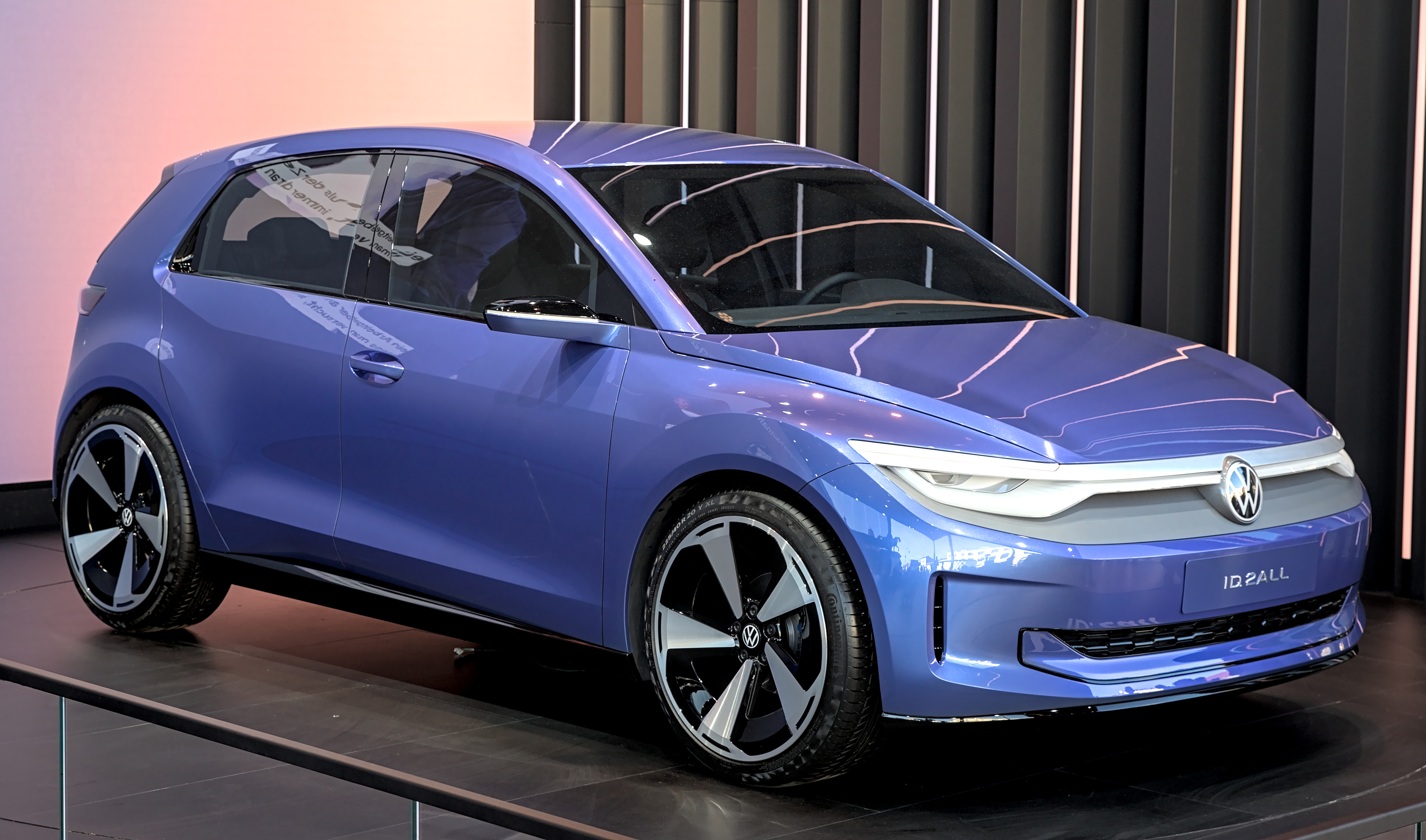
Volkswagen ID. 2all

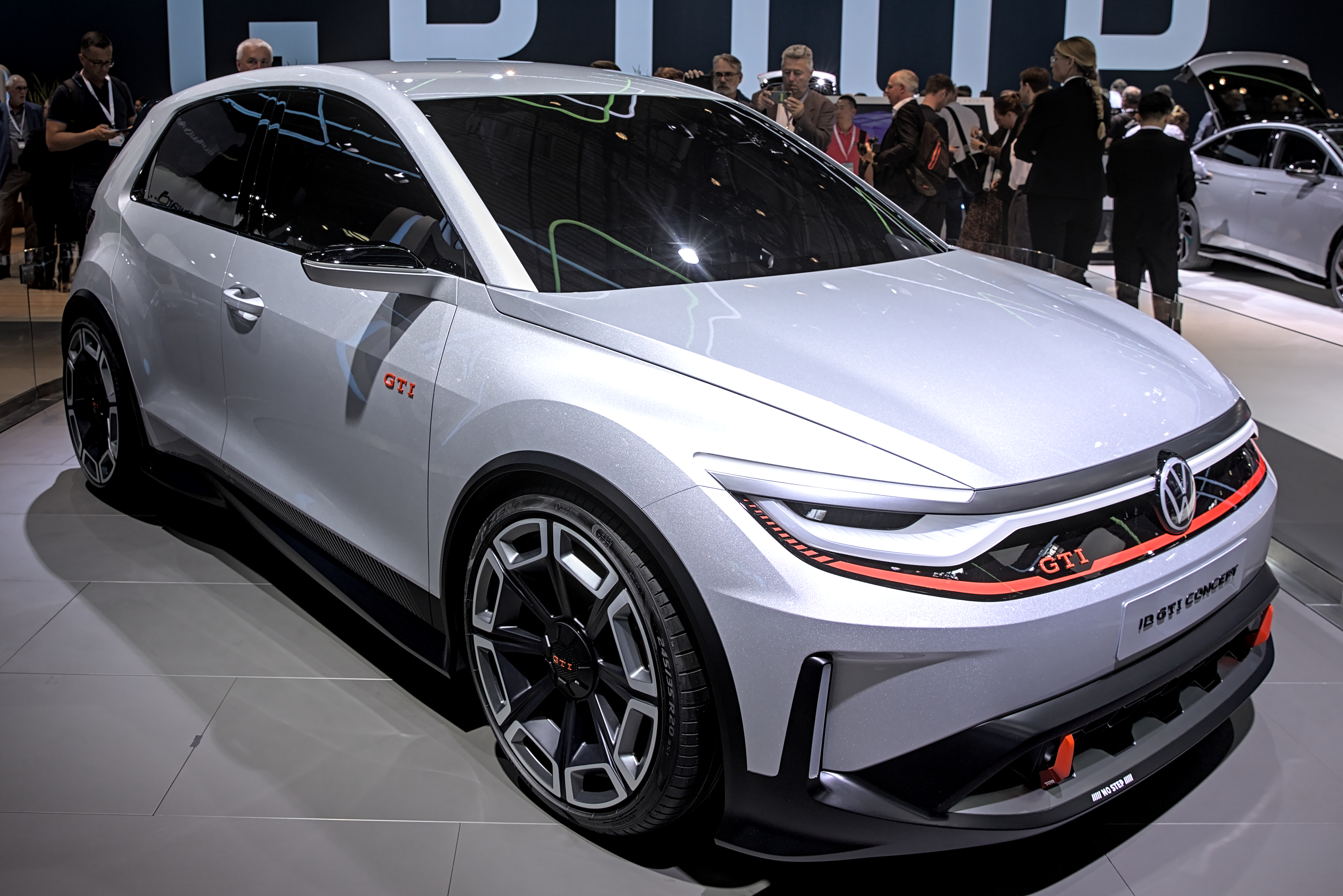
Volkswagen ID. GTI

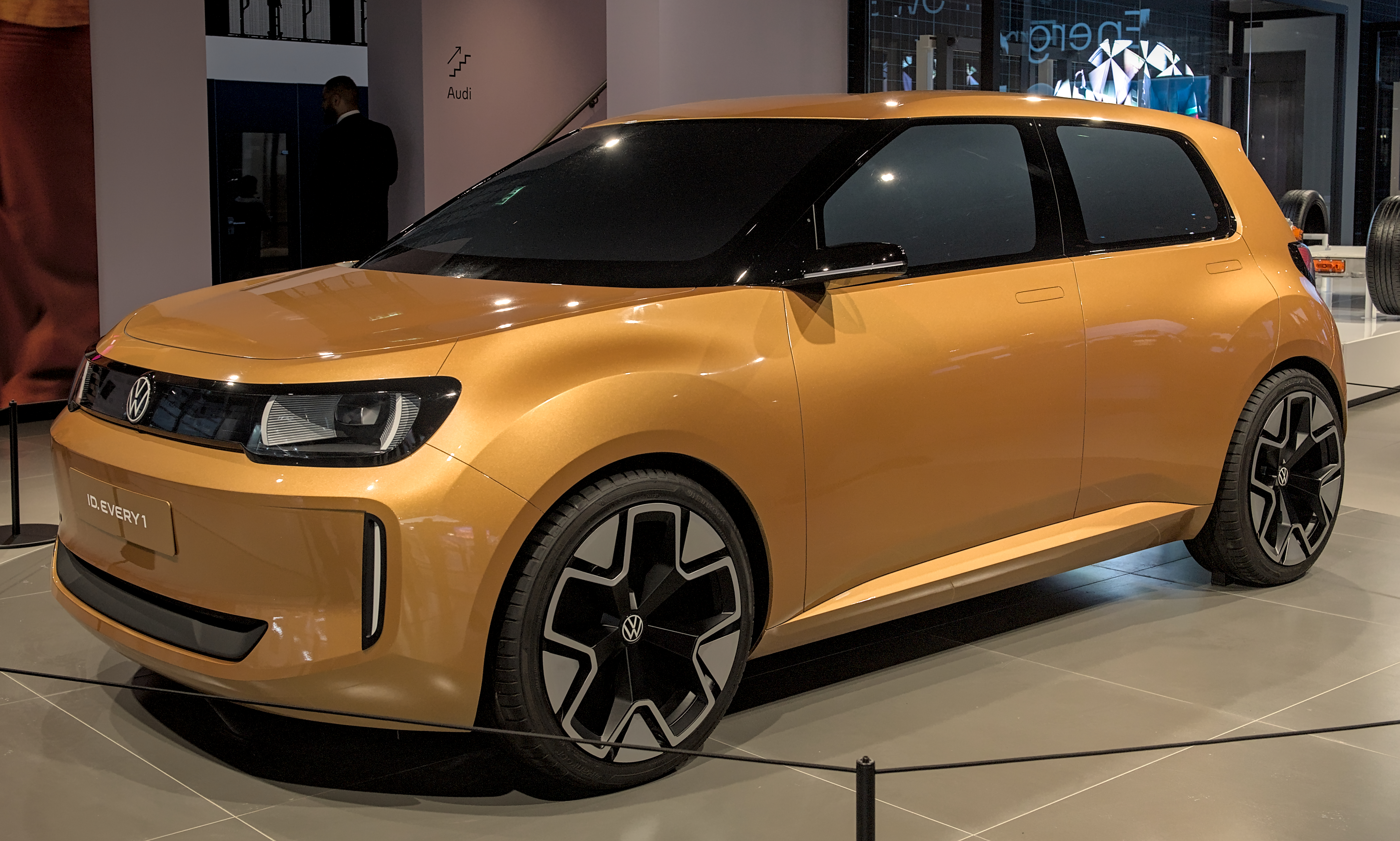
Volkswagen ID. Every1

== Sales to other manufacturers ==
In 2018, VW announced that it is open to sharing the platform with manufacturers outside of the VW Group. In addition to the platform, VW also offered individual components as well as top hat development and contract manufacturing.

=== Ford ===
In late 2018, the companies announced talks about the sharing of technology. Ford Motor Company became the first manufacturer outside Volkswagen Group to use MEB in production vehicles. The companies agreed to cooperate on electric vehicles in 2019, initially planning around 600,000 MEB-based cars. In March 2022, Ford increased its planned production volume to 1.2 million vehicles over six years.

The Explorer and Capri both entered production in 2024 at Ford's plant in Cologne, Germany. Ford also began assembling battery packs for the two models in Cologne in June 2025.

=== Mahindra ===
In 2022, Volkswagen began working with Indian car manufacturer Mahindra & Mahindra on the use of MEB components in Mahindra's own electric vehicle platform, INGLO. The companies signed a supply agreement in February 2024, covering electric components and battery cells, with a planned total battery capacity of around 50 GWh over the agreement's lifetime.

Volkswagen began supplying MEB components in June 2024, while deliveries of standardized battery cells from PowerCo remained planned. Mahindra uses the INGLO platform for its electric SUVs, including the BE 6, XEV 9e and XEV 9S.

== Electric motors ==
Early MEB models used the APP310, a permanent-magnet synchronous motor mounted at the rear axle. All-wheel-drive versions add an induction motor at the front axle, which provides additional power when needed.

Drive unit	Position	Maximum output	Maximum torque	Example model
APP310	Rear	150 kW	310 Nm	Volkswagen ID.3
APP550	Rear	240 kW	560 Nm	Volkswagen ID.7
APP350	Rear	170 kW	350 Nm	Volkswagen ID.3 Neo
APP290	Front	155 kW	290 Nm	Volkswagen ID. Polo
AKA150	Front (all-wheel drive)	80 kW	—	Volkswagen ID.7 GTX

The MEB+ update in 2026 introduced two new drive units. The rear-mounted APP350 replaced the APP310 in most versions of the ID.3 Neo, while smaller front-wheel drive models such as the ID. Polo use a newly developed APP290. The latter has a Volkswagen-developed power inverter using silicon carbide semiconductors to reduce energy losses.

== Production numbers ==
Model	2019	2020	2021	2022	2023	Total
Volkswagen ID.3	50	64,259	73,738	83,432	142,216	363,695
Volkswagen ID.4/5	-	6,487	134,319	207,934	223,425	572,165
Škoda Enyaq iV	-	939	49,811	57,213	86,732	194,695
Audi Q4 e-tron	-	-	27,519	58,764	125,441	211,724
Volkswagen ID.6	-	-	20,461	38,846	15,926	75,233
Cupra Born	-	-	4,801	36,153	45,748	86,702
Audi Q5 e-tron	-	-	99	3,113	5,506	8,718
Volkswagen ID. Buzz	-	-	-	11,013	35,272	46,285
Volkswagen ID.7	-	-	-	-	8,592	8,592
Ford Explorer EV	-	-	-	-	-	0
Ford Capri EV	-	-	-	-	-	0
Annual	50	71,685	310,748	496,468	688,858	1,567,809

=== Global market share ===
	2019	2020	2021	2022	2023	2024	2025
MEB production	50	71,685	310,748	496,468	688,858		
Global BEV Sales	1,692,000	2,270,800	4,805,280	7,681,060			
market share	0.00%	3.16%	6.47%	6.46%	%	%	%

== See also ==
- Volkswagen ID. series
- Volkswagen Group Premium Platform Electric – a similar platform for premium cars
- Volkswagen Group Scalable Systems Platform – a similar platform to be introduced from 2026
- List of Volkswagen Group platforms
- Hyundai E-GMP – a similar multi-vehicle electric platform
