= Klaus Zyciora =

German automotive designer

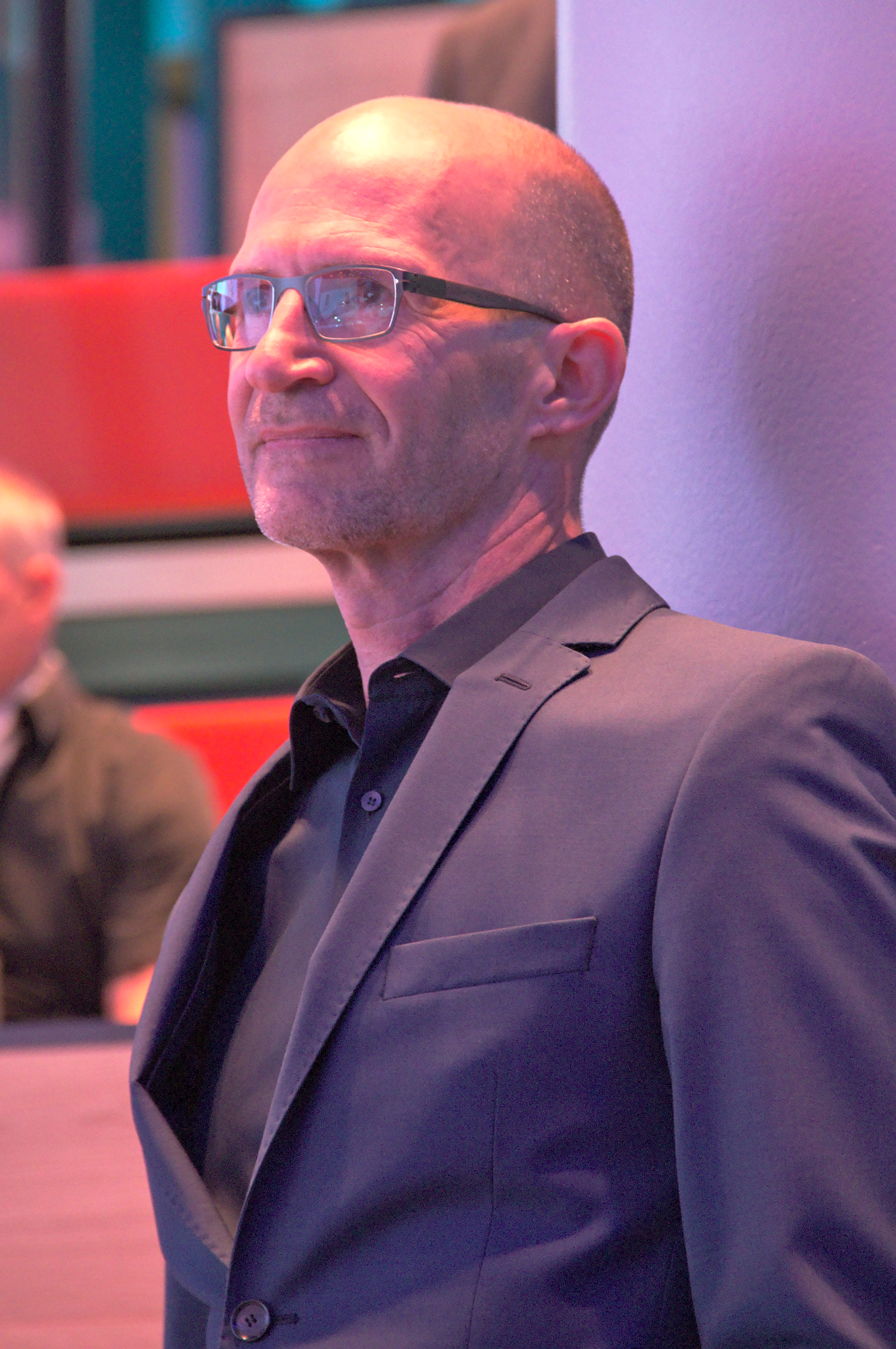
- Klaus Zyciora at International Motor Show Germany 2019
- Born: Klaus Bischoff; 13 December 1961 (age 63); Hamburg, West Germany
- Occupation: Automotive designer
- Notable work: Volkswagen ID. series
- Spouse: Janine Zyciora

Klaus Zyciora (né Bischoff, born 13 December 1961) is a German automotive designer. He is vice president at Changan Automobile and in charge of the group's global design. Previously he was a designer at Volkswagen.

== Early life ==
He was born on 13 December 1961, in Hamburg, Germany.

== Career ==
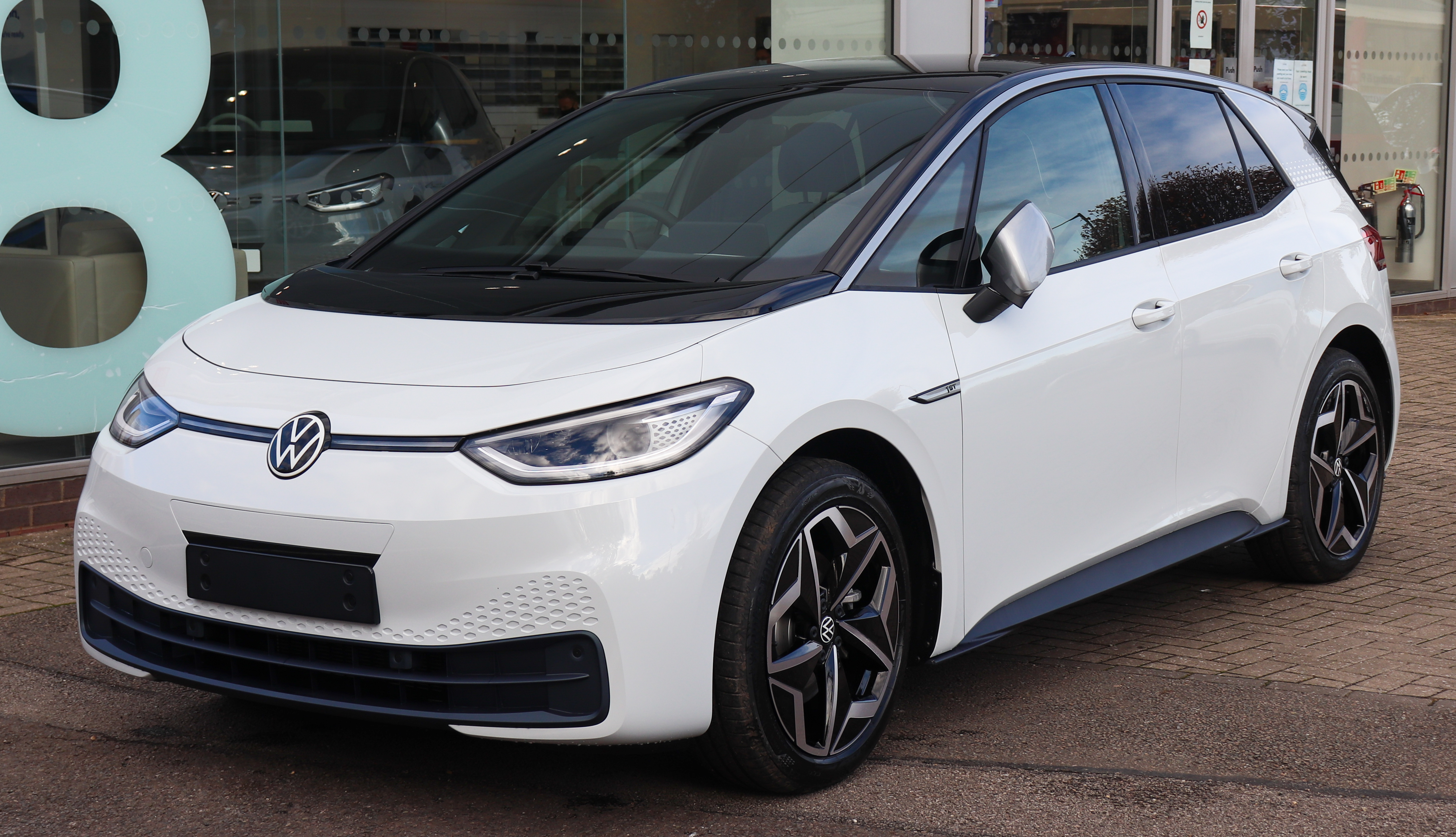
Volkswagen ID.3

Zyciora studied industrial design at Braunschweig University of Art. He graduated in 1989 and began working at Volkswagen as an automotive interior designer. His first project at the company was designing the interior of the Volkswagen Golf Mk4. He later became exterior designer and concept designer at Volkswagen before becoming head of Interior Design in 2000 then head of Exterior Design in 2002, before becoming head of Design (for the Volkswagen marque) and executive director in 2007.

In April 2020, Zyciora was promoted to Head of Design for the Volkswagen Group as a whole, with his previous position being taken over by Jozef Kabaň.

Zyciora is the designer of all current Volkswagen ID. series production models; the ID.3, ID.4, ID.5, ID.6, ID.7, ID. Buzz and the ID. Buggy concept.

In December 2022, Volkswagen Group announced that Zyciora would be leaving the company and that Michael Mauer will be replacing him as the Head of Volkswagen Group Design on 1 January 2023.

On 7 October 2023, Klaus Zyciora became a vice president at Changan Automobile and in charge of the group's global design.
