= Volkswagen ID. series =

Family of battery, plug-in hybrid and extended-range electric cars

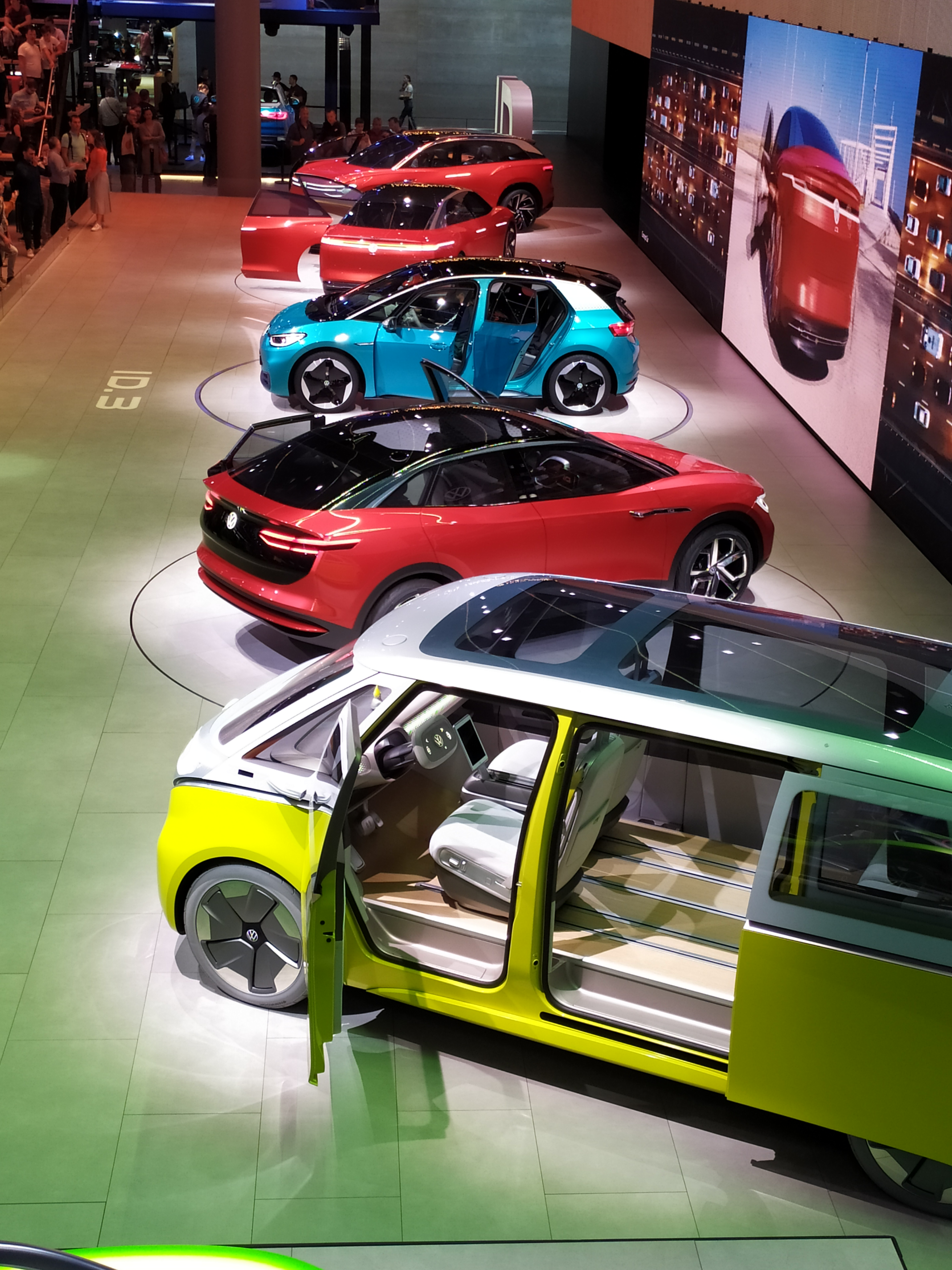
Volkswagen ID. concept cars

The Volkswagen ID. series is a family of battery, plug-in hybrid and extended-range electric cars from Volkswagen (VW) primarily using its MEB platform that is developed by the Volkswagen Group for a range of vehicles.

Deliveries began in late 2020. By November 2022, half a million vehicles had been delivered.

== History and etymology ==
The ID. series is the first series of cars from VW, purpose-built as electric vehicles. Most of its production vehicles were adapted from several concept car models. According to Volkswagen, ID. stands for "intelligent design, identity and visionary technologies".

== Production models ==
| Model | Segment / type | Image | Introduction | Markets | Vehicle information |
|---|---|---|---|---|---|
| ID. Polo | B / hatchback | | April 2026 | Europe | B-segment full-electric hatchback. Derived from Volkswagen ID.2all and ID.GTI concept. |
| ID. Polo GTI | B / hatchback | | May 2026 | Europe | B-segment full-electric hatchback. Derived from Volkswagen ID.2all and ID.GTI concept. |
| ID. Cross | B / crossover SUV | | July 2026 | Europe | B-segment full-electric crossover SUV. Derived from Volkswagen ID. Cross concept. |
| ID.3 | C / hatchback | | September 2019 | Europe, China and others | C-segment full-electric hatchback. Derived from Volkswagen ID. concept. |
| ID. Tiguan | C / crossover SUV | | October 2026 | Europe | Two-row C-segment full-electric crossover SUV. Replaces the ID.4, starting in Europe and coming to the United States "at a later date.". |
| ID. Era 5X | C / crossover SUV | | August 2026 | China | C-segment electric SUV. |
| ID. Unyx 06 | C / coupe SUV | | July 2024 | China | Two-row C-segment full-electric coupe SUV. Rebadged Cupra Tavascan. |
| ID.6 | D / crossover SUV | | April 2021 | China | Three-row D-segment crossover SUV. Derived from Volkswagen ID. Roomzz concept. |
| ID. Aura T6 | D / crossover SUV | | April 2026 | China | D-segment electric crossover SUV. |
| ID.7 | D / saloon | | April 2023 | Europe and others | D-segment full-electric saloon. Derived from Volkswagen ID. Vizzion and ID. Aero concept. |
| ID. Era 5S | D / saloon | | August 2026 | China | D-segment plug-in hybrid saloon. |
| ID. Unyx 07 | D / saloon | | April 2026 | China | D-segment electric saloon. |
| ID.7 Tourer | D / estate | | February 2024 | Europe | Estate version of the ID.7. Derived from Volkswagen ID. Space Vizzion concept. |
| ID. Unyx 09 | E / saloon | | April 2026 | China | E-segment electric saloon. |
| ID. Era 8X | E / crossover SUV | | August 2026 | China | E-segment range extender SUV. |
| ID. Unyx 08 | E / crossover SUV | | March 2026 | China | E-segment full-electric crossover SUV. Derived from Volkswagen ID. Evo concept. |
| ID. Era 9X | F / crossover SUV | | January 2026 | China | F-segment range extender crossover SUV. Derived from Volkswagen ID. Era concept. |
| ID. Buzz | Van/minivan | | March 2022 | Europe, North America and others | Two-row and three-row van/minivan and panel van. Derived from Volkswagen ID. Buzz and ID. Buzz Cargo concept. |
| ID. Buzz Cargo | Van/minivan | | March 2022 | Europe | Two-row and three-row van/minivan and panel van. Derived from Volkswagen ID. Buzz and ID. Buzz Cargo concept. |

== Former production models ==
| Model | Segment / type | Image | Introduction | Discontinued | Markets | Vehicle information |
|---|---|---|---|---|---|---|
| ID.4 | C / crossover SUV | | September 2020 | 2026 | Europe, North America, China, and others | Two-row C-segment full-electric crossover SUV. Derived from Volkswagen ID. Crozz concept. |
| ID.5 | C / coupe SUV | | November 2021 | 2026 | Europe | Coupe SUV version of the ID.4. |

== Upcoming models ==
| Model | Segment / Type | Production | Notes | Refs |
|---|---|---|---|---|
| ID. Up / Lupo | A / hatchback | 2027 (planned) | Replaces VW E-up! | |
| ID. Aura L5 | D / saloon | 2026 (planned) | D-segment electric saloon. Derived from Volkswagen ID. Aura concept. Will only be sold in China | |

== Concept vehicles ==
Summary of Volkswagen ID. series concept vehicles
| Model | Segment / Type | Image | Production | Notes | Refs |
|---|---|---|---|---|---|
| ID. | C / hatchback | | 2019 (as ID.3) | Introduced at the 2016 Paris Motor Show, First ID. concept vehicle. | |
| ID. Crozz | C / crossover | | 2020 (as ID.4) | Introduced at the 2017 Shanghai Motor Show and Frankfurt Auto Show; planned production 2020. | |
| ID. Crozz II | C / crossover | | 2020 (as ID.4) | Introduced at the 2017 Shanghai Motor Show and Frankfurt Auto Show; planned production 2020. | |
| ID. Vizzion | D / saloon | | 2023 (as ID.7) | Introduced at the 2018 Geneva Motor Show; planned production 2022. Intended to demonstrate advanced driver assistance systems. | |
| ID. Space Vizzion | D / estate | | 2024 (as ID.7 Tourer) | Introduced at the 2019 Los Angeles Auto Show; planned production 2024. | |
| ID. Roomzz | D / crossover | | 2021 (as ID.6) | Introduced at the 2019 Shanghai Motor Show; planned production 2021. | |
| ID. Buzz | M / van | | 2022 (as ID. Buzz) | Introduced at the 2017 Detroit Auto Show; planned production 2022. Cargo variant planned. Similar to BUDD-e concept. | |
| ID. Buzz Cargo | M / van | | 2022 (as ID. Buzz) | Introduced at the 2017 Detroit Auto Show; planned production 2022. Cargo variant planned. Similar to BUDD-e concept. | |
| ID. R | Sports prototype racecar | | — | Initially named ID. R Pikes Peak and set the course record during the 2018 Pikes Peak International Hill Climb; later raced on Nürburgring (DE), Goodwood Circuit (UK), and Tianmen Mountain (CN). | |
| ID. Buggy | Dune buggy | | — (Cancelled) | Introduced at the 2019 Geneva Motor Show. Potentially to enter production. | |
| ID.X | C / hot hatchback | | — | Prototype performance version of ID.3 with mechanical parts from ID.4 GTX. | |
| ID. Life | B / hatchback | | — (Cancelled) | Introduced at the 2021 IAA Mobility; intended to be the production version of ID.2. However, after falling out of favour at Volkswagen, it was completely redesigned to ID. 2all. The design elements were carried to the ID. Every1. | |
| ID. AERO | D / saloon | | 2023 (as ID.7) | Introduced in China on 27 June 2022; to be built in two separate versions by the two joint ventures (SAIC VW and FAW-VW). It will be sold globally and the European model will be assembled in Emden starting in 2023. Evolution of the earlier ID. VIZZION concept. | |
| ID. XTRAME | C / crossover | | — | Off-road vehicle based on ID.4 GTX pre-production prototype, used to gauge public interest. | |
| ID. Project Trinity | Unknown | | 2032 | The VW's set of blueprints for next-generation electric cars. | |
| ID. 2all | B / hatchback | | 2026 (as ID. Polo) | Introduced in March 2023; planned production 2026. Based on the MEB Entry platform and is the first application of MEB to a front-drive vehicle. | |
| ID.GTI | B / hot hatchback | | 2026 (as ID. Polo GTI) | Introduced at the 2023 Munich Motor Show, Sport version of the ID.2all; planned production 2026. | |
| ID. Next | D / saloon | | — | Introduced at the 2023 Auto Shanghai, The ID.7's sister model for the Chinese market, which will be manufactured by SAIC Volkswagen, while the ID.7 Vizzion will be produced by FAW-Volkswagen. | |
| ID.X Performance | D / saloon | | — | Performance version of ID.7. | |
| ID. Code | D / crossover | | — | Introduced at the 2024 Auto China in Beijing. It previews a design language developed specifically for China. | |
| ID. Every1 | A / hatchback | | 2027 | Introduced in March 2025; planned production 2027. Evolution of the earlier ID. Life concept. | |
| ID. Evo | E / crossover | | 2026 (as ID. Unyx 08) | Introduced at the 2025 Auto Shanghai, will be manufactured by Volkswagen Anhui; planned production 2026. | |
| ID. Era | F / crossover | | 2026 (as ID. Era 9X) | Introduced at the 2025 Auto Shanghai. First vehicle range extender. Deliveries expected Q1 2026, will be manufactured by SAIC Volkswagen; planned production 2026. | |
| ID. Aura | D / saloon | | 2026 (as ID. Aura L5) | Introduced at the 2025 Auto Shanghai. First vehicle based on the China-specific CMP platform; will be manufactured by FAW-Volkswagen, planned production 2026. | |
| ID. Cross | B / Crossover | | 2026 (as ID. Cross) | Introduced at the 2025 Munich Motor Show; planned production 2026. | |

== See also ==
- Volkswagen Group MEB platform
- BMW i
- Toyota bZ
- Ioniq
- Kia EV series
- Mercedes-EQ
- Audi e-tron
