= Volkswagen ID.7 =

Battery electric executive car

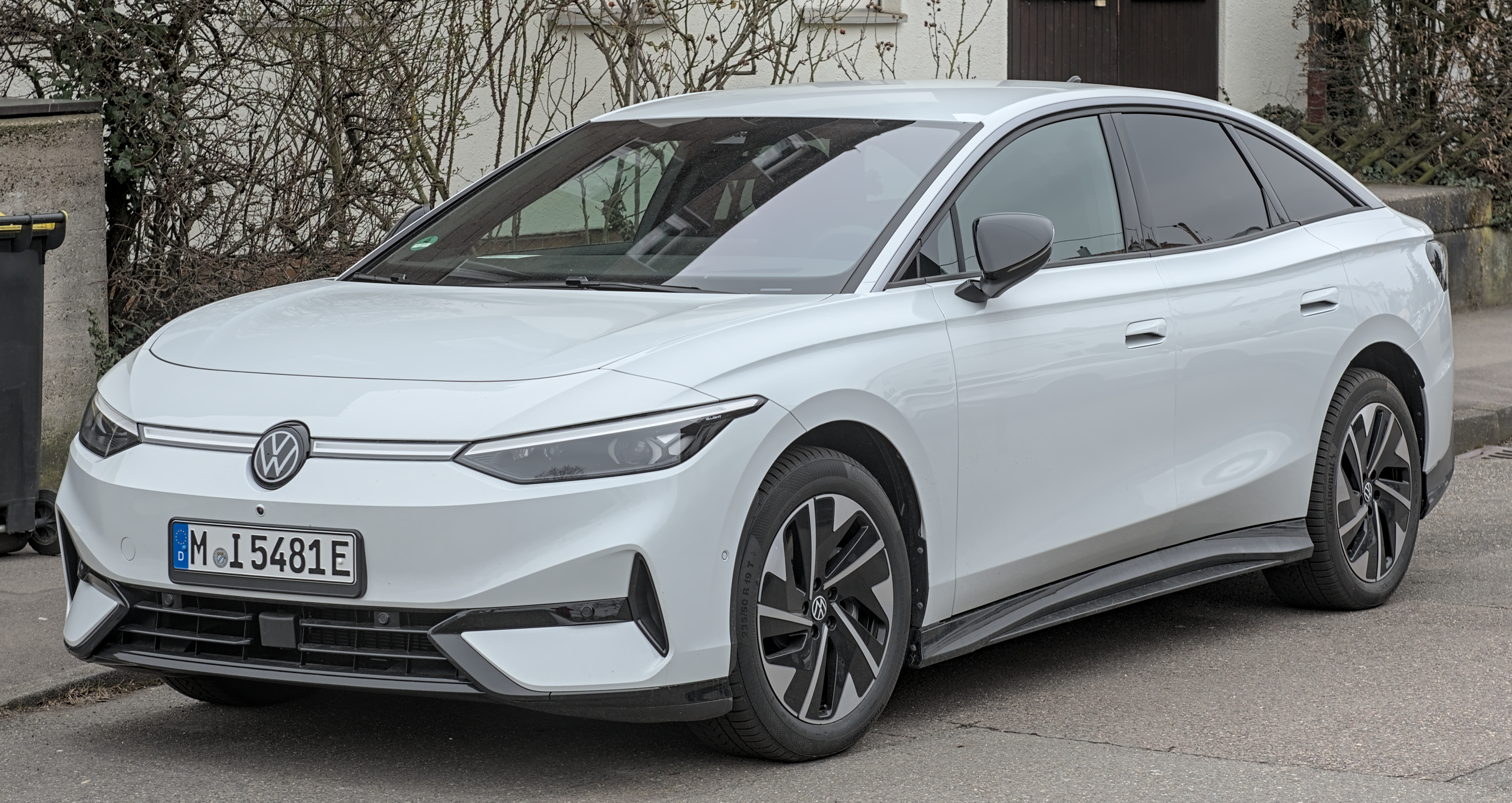

Overview
- Manufacturer: Volkswagen
- Model code: ED2 (liftback); ED5 (estate)
- Production: August 2023 – present (Europe); 2023–2026 (China)
- Assembly: Germany: Emden; China: Foshan (FAW-VW, ID.7 Vizzion)
- Designer: Michal Uhrin

Body and chassis
- Class: Executive car (E)
- Body style: 5-door liftback; 5-door estate
- Layout: Rear-motor, rear-wheel-drive; Dual-motor, all-wheel-drive
- Platform: Volkswagen Group MEB
- Related: Volkswagen ID.6; Volkswagen ID.4/ID.5; Volkswagen ID.3; Volkswagen ID. Unyx 07

Powertrain
- Electric motor: 1× or 2× APP 550 permanent magnet synchronous
- Power output: 210 kW (282 hp; 286 PS) (RWD); 250 kW (335 hp; 340 PS) (GTX/AWD)
- Battery: 77 kWh LGES lithium-ion (Pro) (NCM712); 85 kWh LGES lithium-ion (Pro S) (NCM712)
- Range: 615 km (382 mi) Pro (WLTP); 702 km (436 mi) Pro S (WLTP)

Dimensions
- Wheelbase: 2,966 mm (116.8 in)
- Length: 4,961 mm (195.3 in)
- Width: 1,862 mm (73.3 in)
- Height: 1,538 mm (60.6 in)
- Kerb weight: 2,172–2,250 kg (4,788–4,960 lb)

Chronology
- Predecessor: Volkswagen Passat (B8) (saloon); Volkswagen Arteon
- Successor: Volkswagen ID. Unyx 07 (China)

The Volkswagen ID.7 is a battery electric car produced by German marque Volkswagen since 2023. It has a five-door liftback design and is marketed in the E-segment.

An estate model marketed as the Tourer or Shooting Brake was officially unveiled on 20 February 2024.

== Concept cars ==
=== Volkswagen ID. Space Vizzion ===
The wagon variant was previewed by the ID. Space Vizzion concept.

=== Volkswagen ID. Aero ===
The model was first previewed by the Volkswagen ID. Aero concept car in June 2022.

=== Volkswagen ID.Next ===
Unveiled in April 2023, the Volkswagen ID.Next previews the ID.7's sister model for the Chinese market, which will be manufactured by SAIC-Volkswagen, while the ID.7 Vizzion will be produced by FAW-Volkswagen.

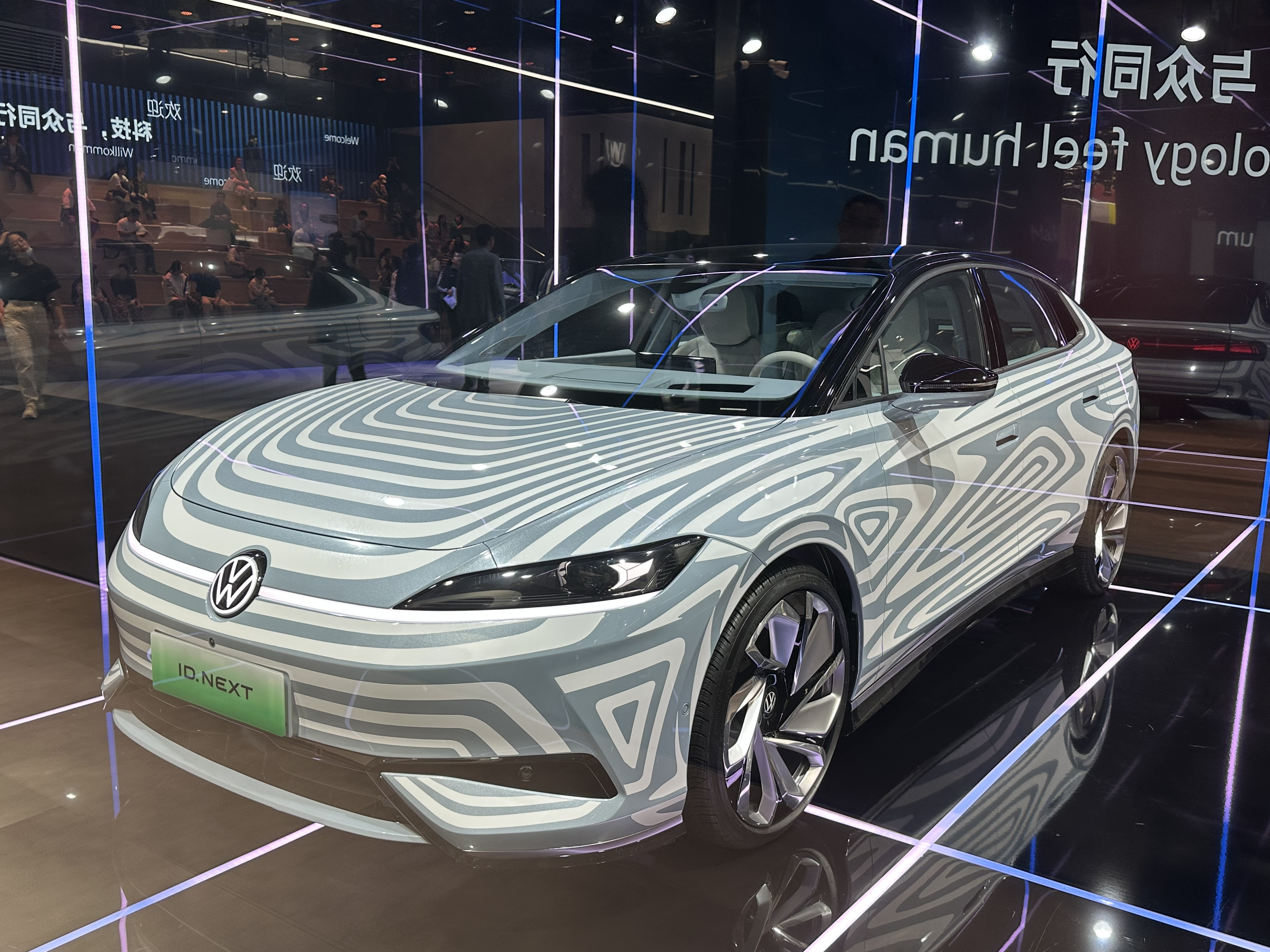
Volkswagen ID.Next

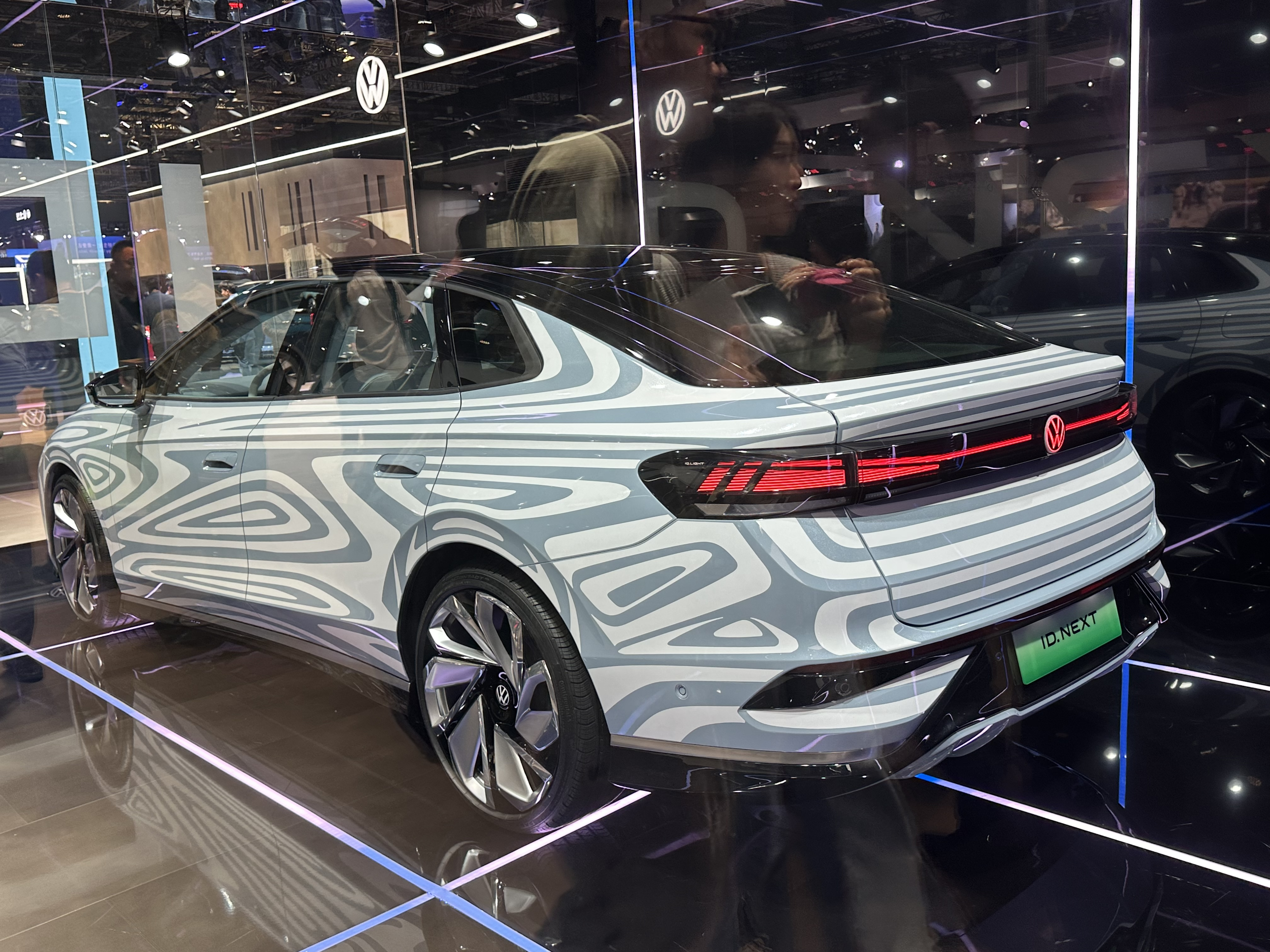
Rear view

== Overview ==
A camouflaged near-production version was previewed on 4 January 2023, at the Consumer Electronics Show in Las Vegas. The world premiere of the ID.7 took place on 17 April 2023, simultaneously in Berlin and at the Shanghai Auto Show. The vehicle replaces both the Passat and the Arteon large family saloons as the flagship vehicle for the brand. The ID.7 rides on the newly established MEB, where it is based on other battery electric vehicles such as the Volkswagen ID.4 and the Audi Q4 e-tron. It is compared to D-segment vehicles such as the BMW i4 and the Tesla Model 3. VW calls it the most aerodynamic ID series model so far with a CdA=0.23*2.46 m^{2}≈0.57 m^{2}.

The ID.7 is produced in Emden, Germany for Europe, whereas it is built in Foshan and Anting for China. Primarily because the ID.7 is larger and uses a standard rear-wheel drive layout, unlike the previous Arteon and Passat which both had a standard front-wheel drive layout, the ID.7 is positioned upmarket and competes with similar vehicles.

On 19 February 2024, Volkswagen introduced the ID.7 Tourer, an estate version of the ID.7 which measures the same in length compared to the liftback ID.7.

After previously having been confirmed for the North American market, its launch in the United States was delayed and later canceled.

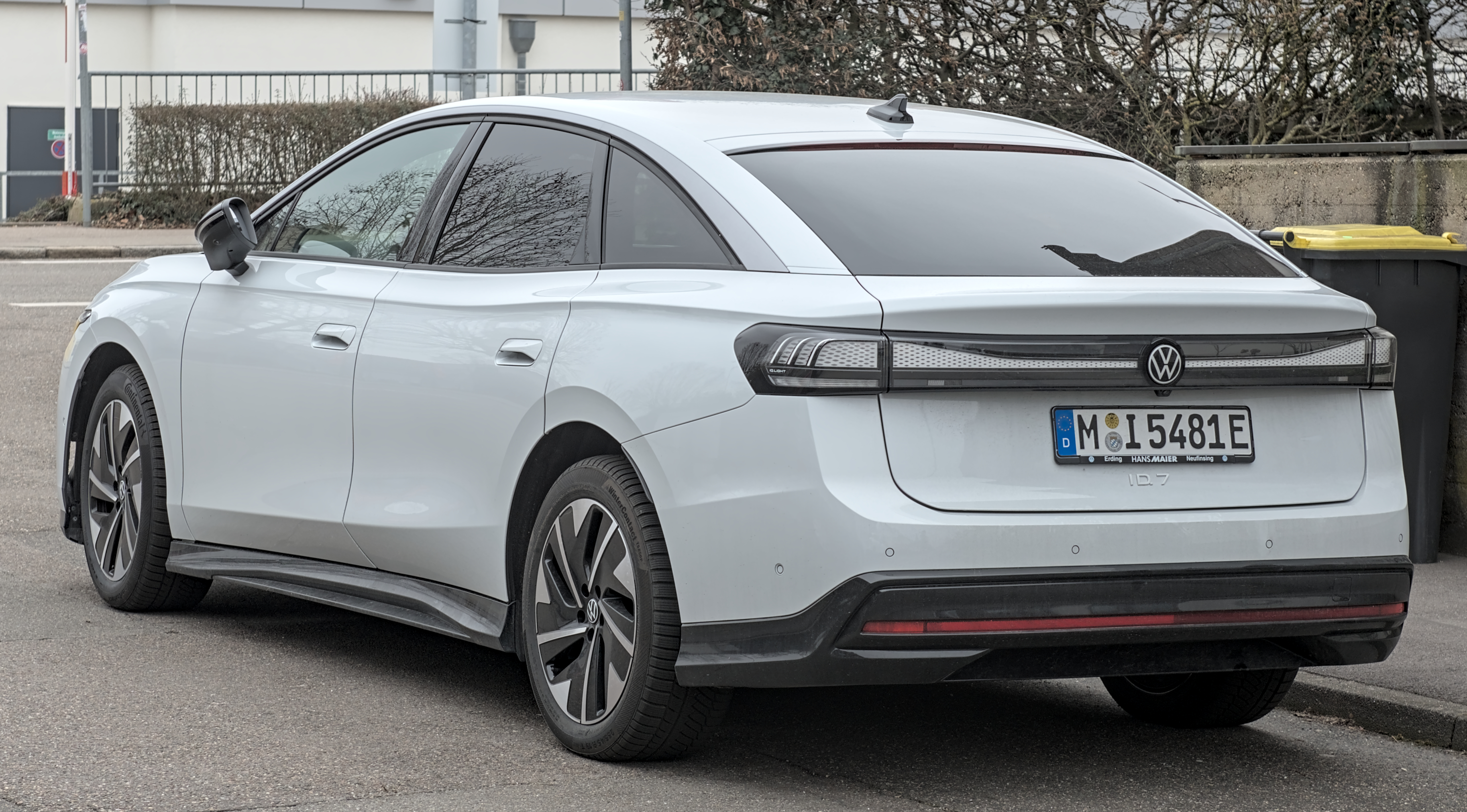
Rear view

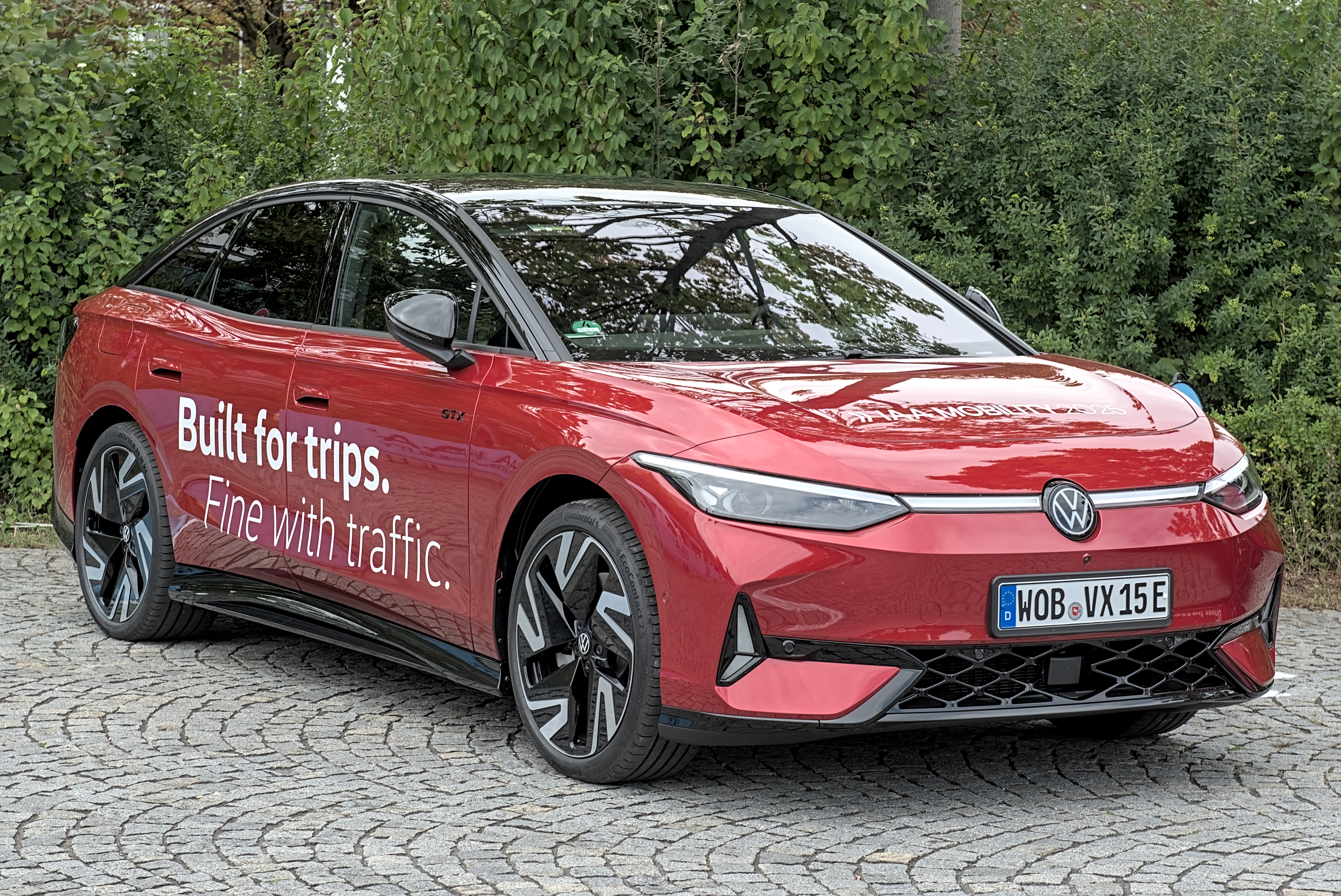
Volkswagen ID.7 GTX

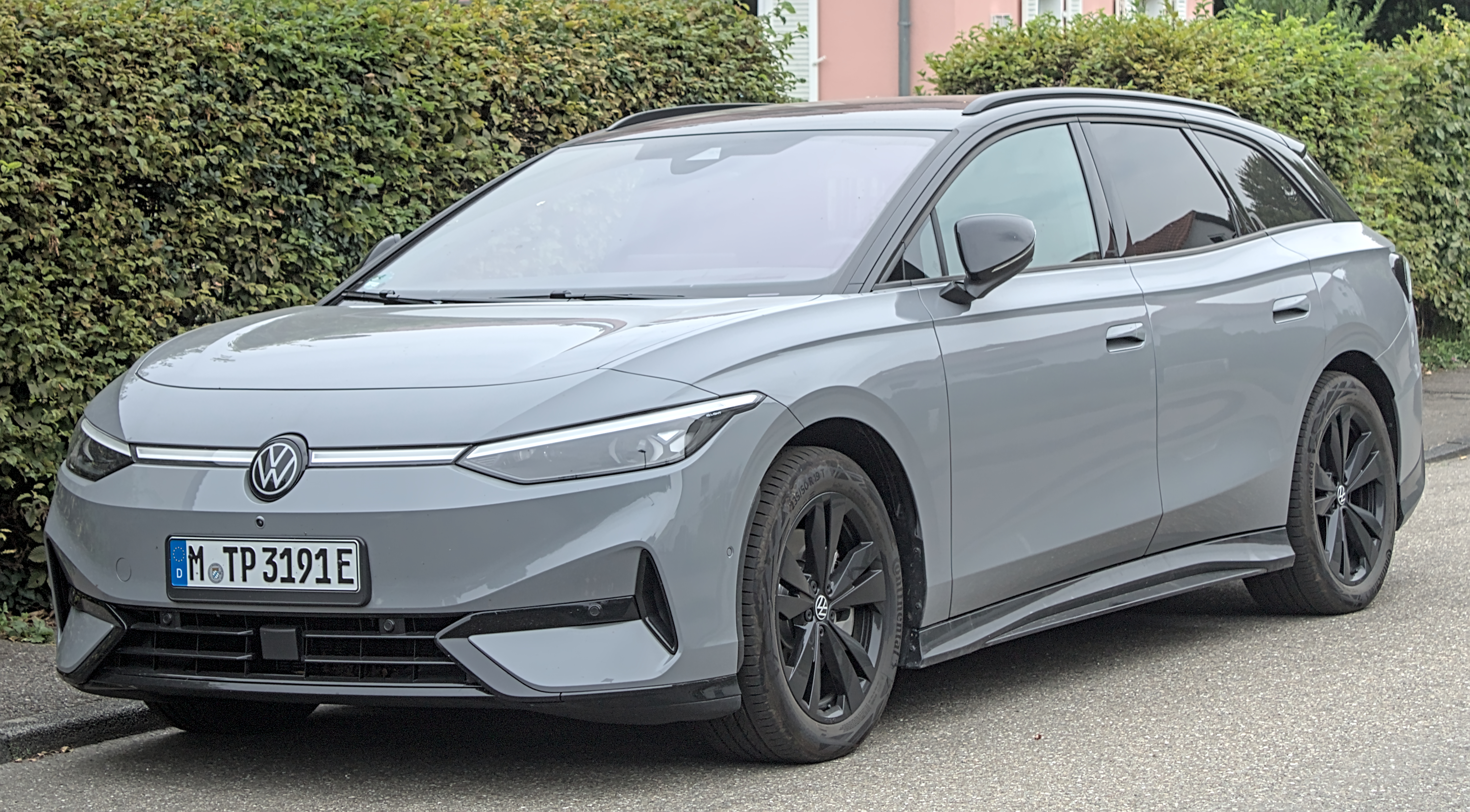
Volkswagen ID.7 Tourer

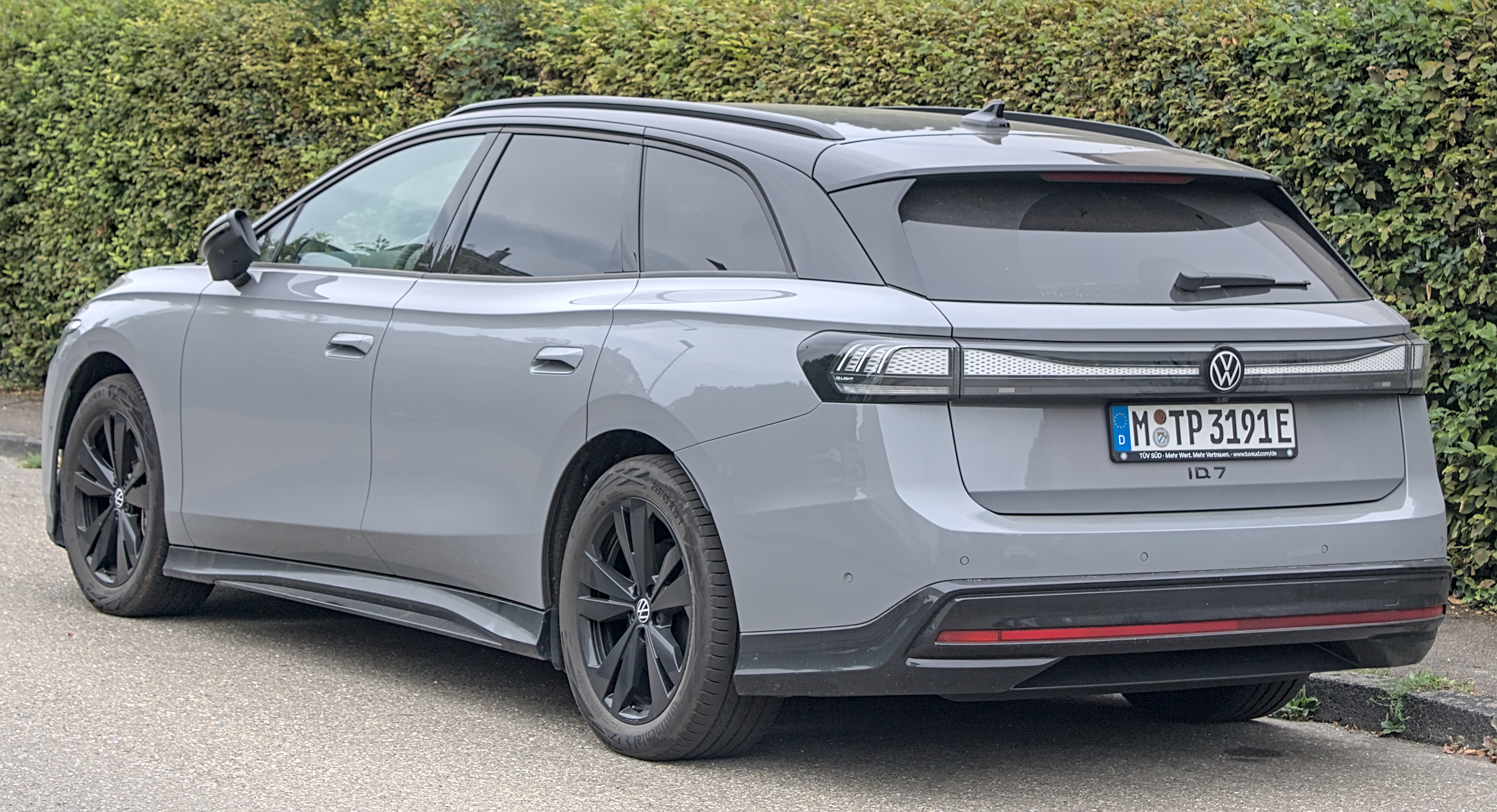
Rear view

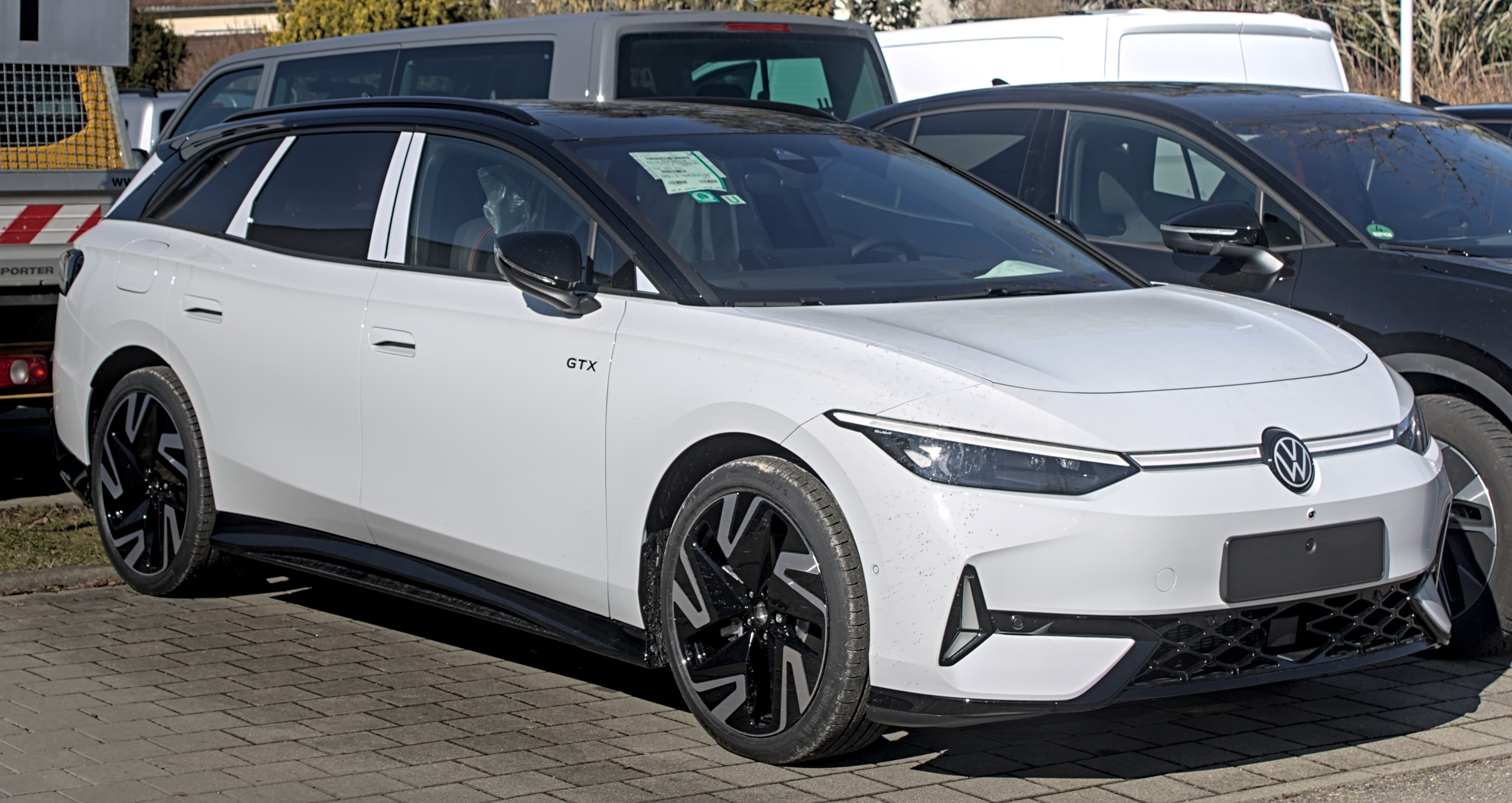
Volkswagen ID.7 Tourer GTX

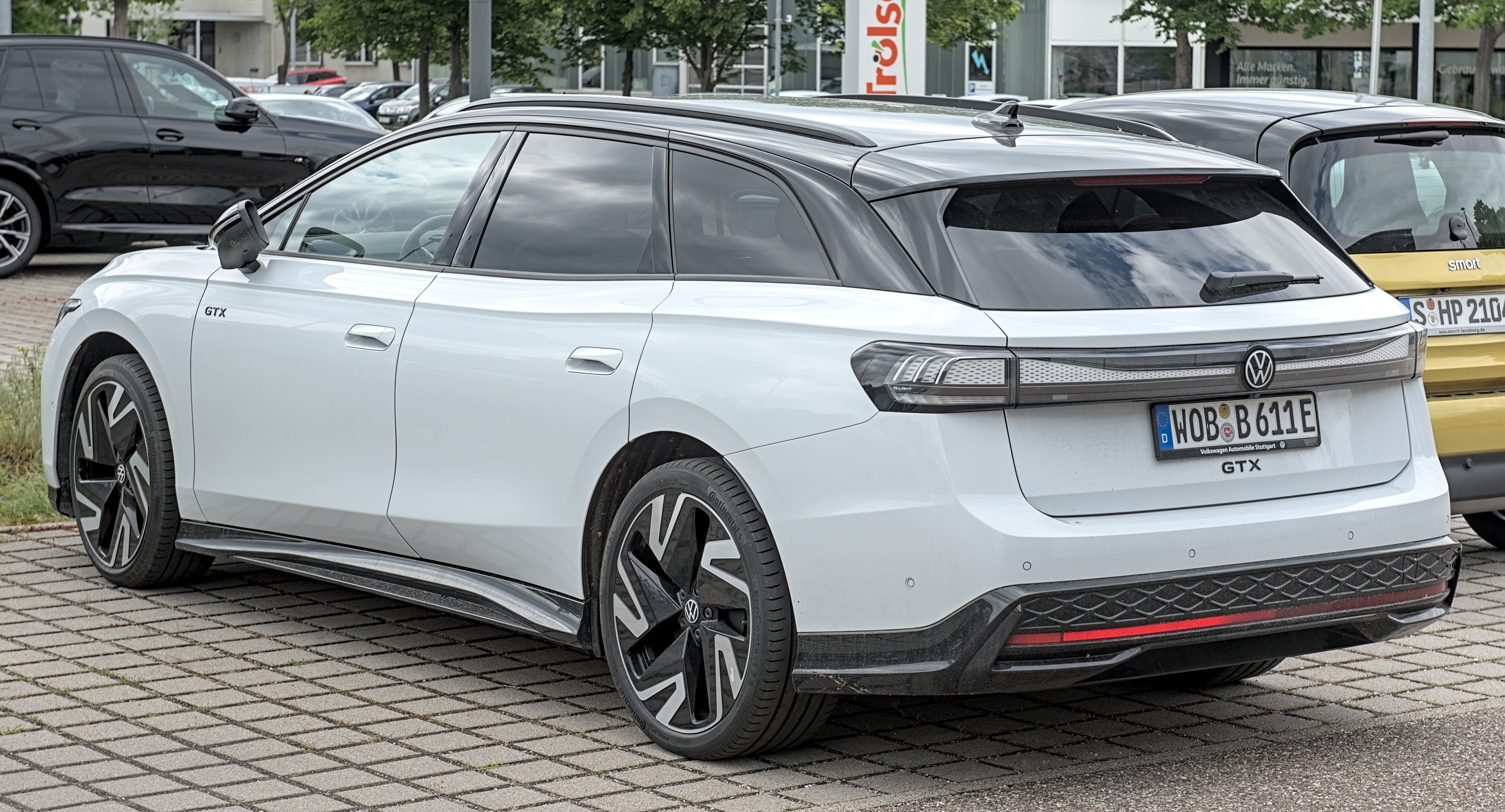
Rear view

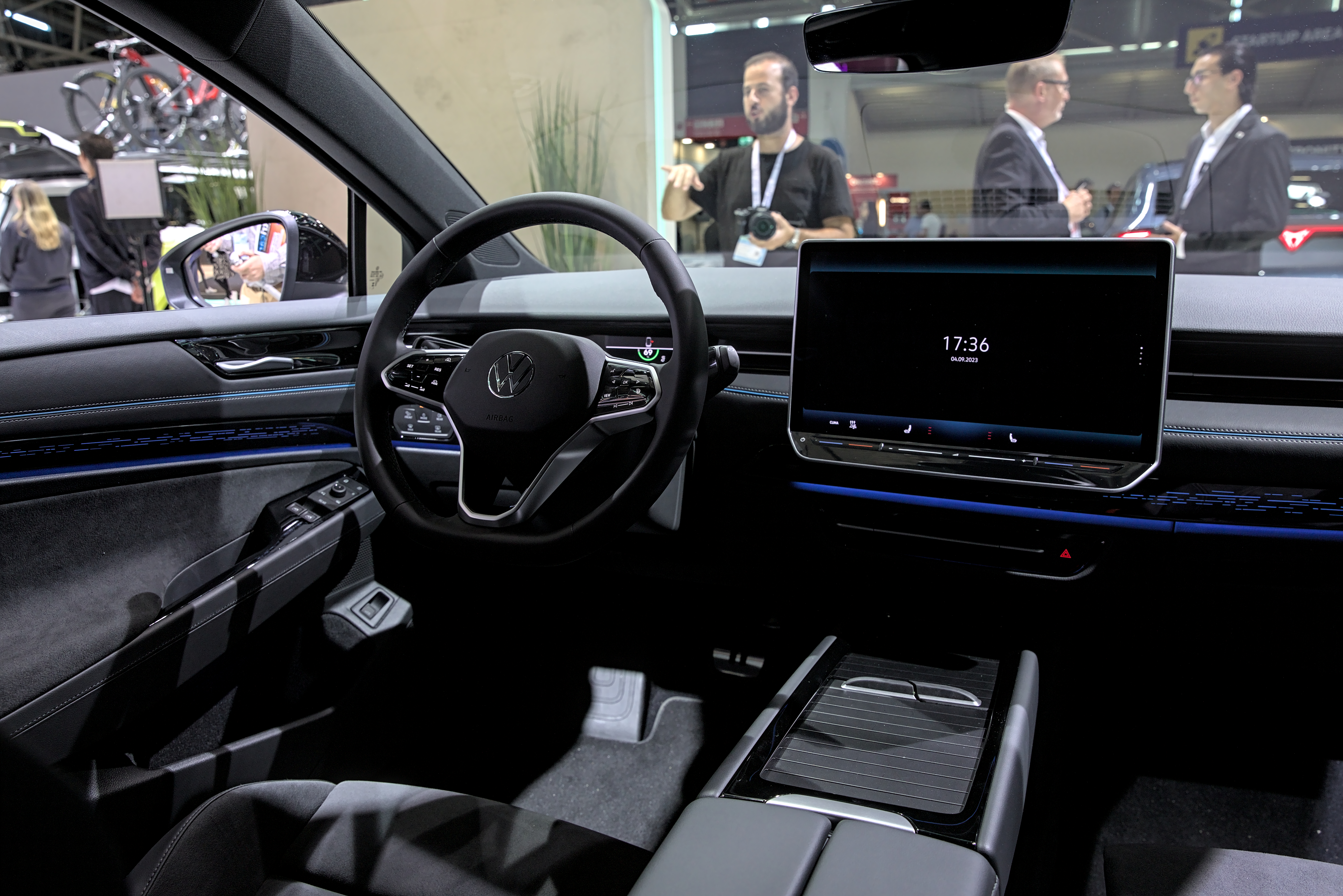
Interior

=== Features ===
The dashboard features a compact digital instrument display as well as a head-up display with augmented reality functions for satellite navigation and a 380 mm (15 in) infotainment touchscreen in the centre. It is equipped with better software and improved touch controls after Volkswagen received complaints about the system used in its other models. Volkswagen's voice control system has been significantly improved, allowing users to perform complex tasks such as searching for high-speed charging stations using voice commands.

Exterior features include an optional panoramic sunroof with smart electric-chroming to dim, and it can be switched from transparent to opaque that can be operated by Volkswagen's voice commands. A 700-watt Harman Kardon audio system with 14 speakers is optional. Automatic parking is standard, which allows the vehicle to park autonomously from more than 16 m (54 ft). Travel Assist is to come on European models, but it is unknown for the US. The front seats feature a brand new design and offer an optional Climatronic massage and temperature and moisture sensors, which automatically adjust to suit the driver and passenger's needs. The climate control system features active air vent control with smart air vents which ventilate through dynamic movement without blowing air directly into the passenger's face.

== Powertrain ==
Type	Model	Electric motor	Battery	Range	Engine Power	Torque	Top speed	0–100 km/h (0–62 mph)	Trans.	Layout	Cal. years
Battery electric	ID.7 Pro	APP 550	82.0 (77 usable) kW⋅h, lithium-ion	621 km (386 mi)^{WLTP}	210 kW (282 hp; 286 PS)	550 N⋅m (56.1 kg⋅m; 406 lb⋅ft)	180 km/h (112 mph)	6.5 sec	Single-speed automatic	RWD	
Battery electric	ID.7 Pro	APP 550	82.0 (77 usable) kW⋅h, lithium-ion	621 km (386 mi)^{WLTP}	210 kW (282 hp; 286 PS)	550 N⋅m (56.1 kg⋅m; 406 lb⋅ft)	180 km/h (112 mph)	6.5 sec	Single-speed automatic	RWD	August 2023 – present
Battery electric	ID.7 Pro S	APP 550	91.0 (86 usable) kW⋅h, lithium-ion	702 km (436 mi)^{WLTP}	210 kW (282 hp; 286 PS)	550 N⋅m (56.1 kg⋅m; 406 lb⋅ft)	180 km/h (112 mph) (est.)	6.5 sec (est.)	Single-speed automatic	RWD	
Battery electric	ID.7 Pro S	APP 550	91.0 (86 usable) kW⋅h, lithium-ion	702 km (436 mi)^{WLTP}	210 kW (282 hp; 286 PS)	550 N⋅m (56.1 kg⋅m; 406 lb⋅ft)	180 km/h (112 mph) (est.)	6.5 sec (est.)	Single-speed automatic	RWD	December 2023 – present
Battery electric	ID.7 GTX	APP 550 rear; AKA 150 front	91.0 (86 usable) kWh, lithium-ion	577 km (358 mi)	250 kW (340 hp; 340 PS)	679 Nm	180 km/h (112 mph)	5.4 sec	Single-speed automatic	AWD	June 2024 – present

== Safety ==
Euro NCAP test results VW ID.7 Pro (LHD) (2023)
Test	Points	%
Overall:	5 /5 stars	
Adult occupant:	38.3	95%
Child occupant:	43.2	88%
Pedestrian:	52.7	83%
Safety assist:	14.5	80%

== Sales ==
Year	China
Year	ID.7 Vizzion
2023	752
2024	6,684
2025	2,094
