= Volkswagen ID. Crozz =

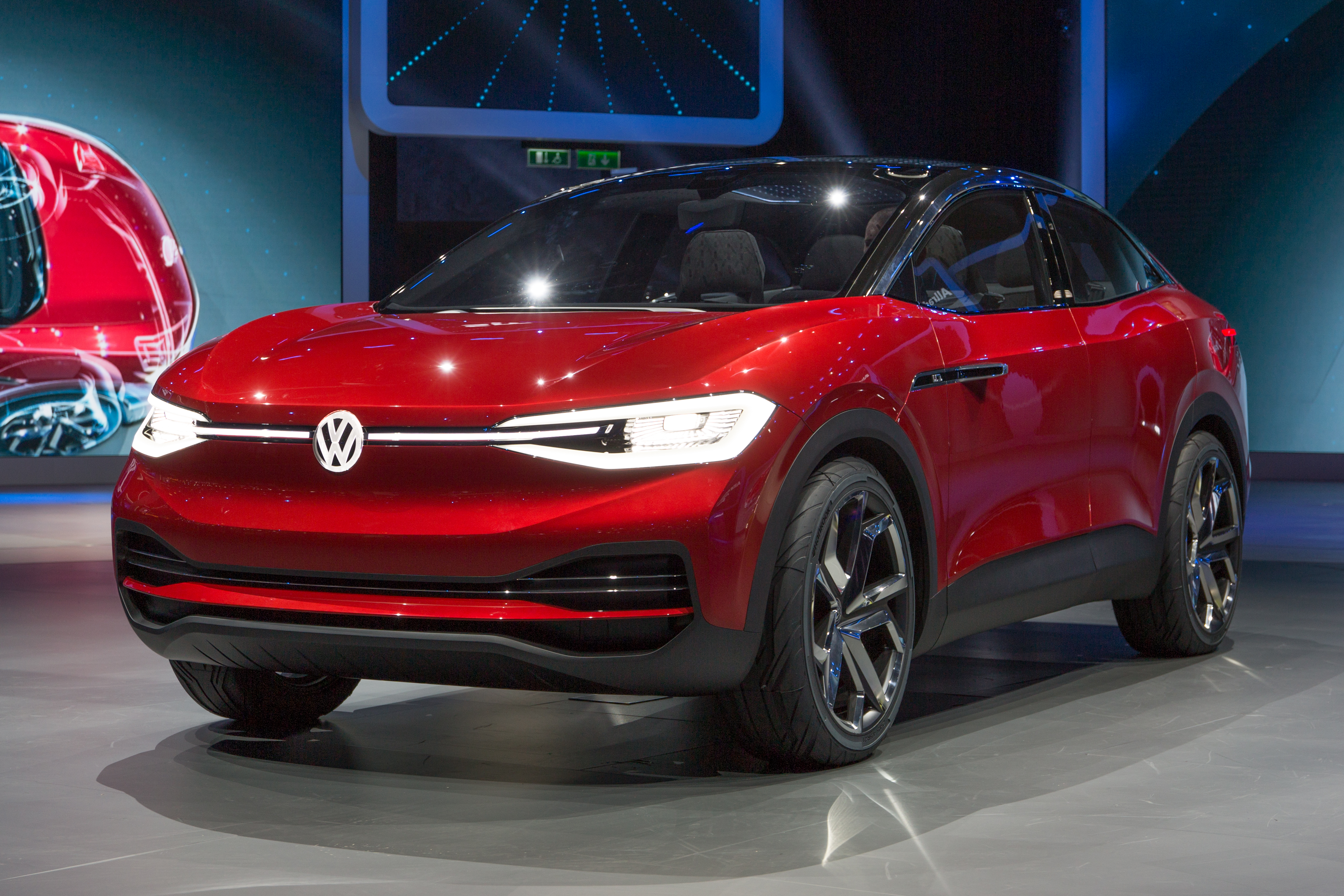
- ID. Crozz II at the 2017 Frankfurt Auto Show

Overview
- Manufacturer: Volkswagen
- Production: 2017 (Concept)

Body and chassis
- Body style: 4-door Crossover
- Platform: Volkswagen Group MEB platform
- Related: ID.4/ID.5

Powertrain
- Electric motor: 225 kW (302 hp)
- Battery: 83 kWh
- Electric range: 501 km (311 mi) (EU)
- Plug-in charging: 150 kW DC charging capacity

Dimensions
- Length: 4,625 mm (182 in)
- Width: 1,891 mm (74 in)
- Height: 1,609 mm (63 in)

The Volkswagen ID. Crozz is an electric concept car based on Volkswagen's electric MEB platform, and part of the ID. series. It was first shown as a prototype at the 2017 Shanghai Auto Show. A revised version, named the "ID. Crozz II", was shown at the 2017 Frankfurt Auto Show. A hint of the ID. Crozz production version was also promised for the 2019 Frankfurt Motor Show, alongside the debut of the ID.3 and the next generation E-up.

The VW ID.4, a production vehicle based on the ID. Crozz prototype was launched on 23 September 2020.

It will be one of nine new Volkswagen brand models based on the MEB platform.

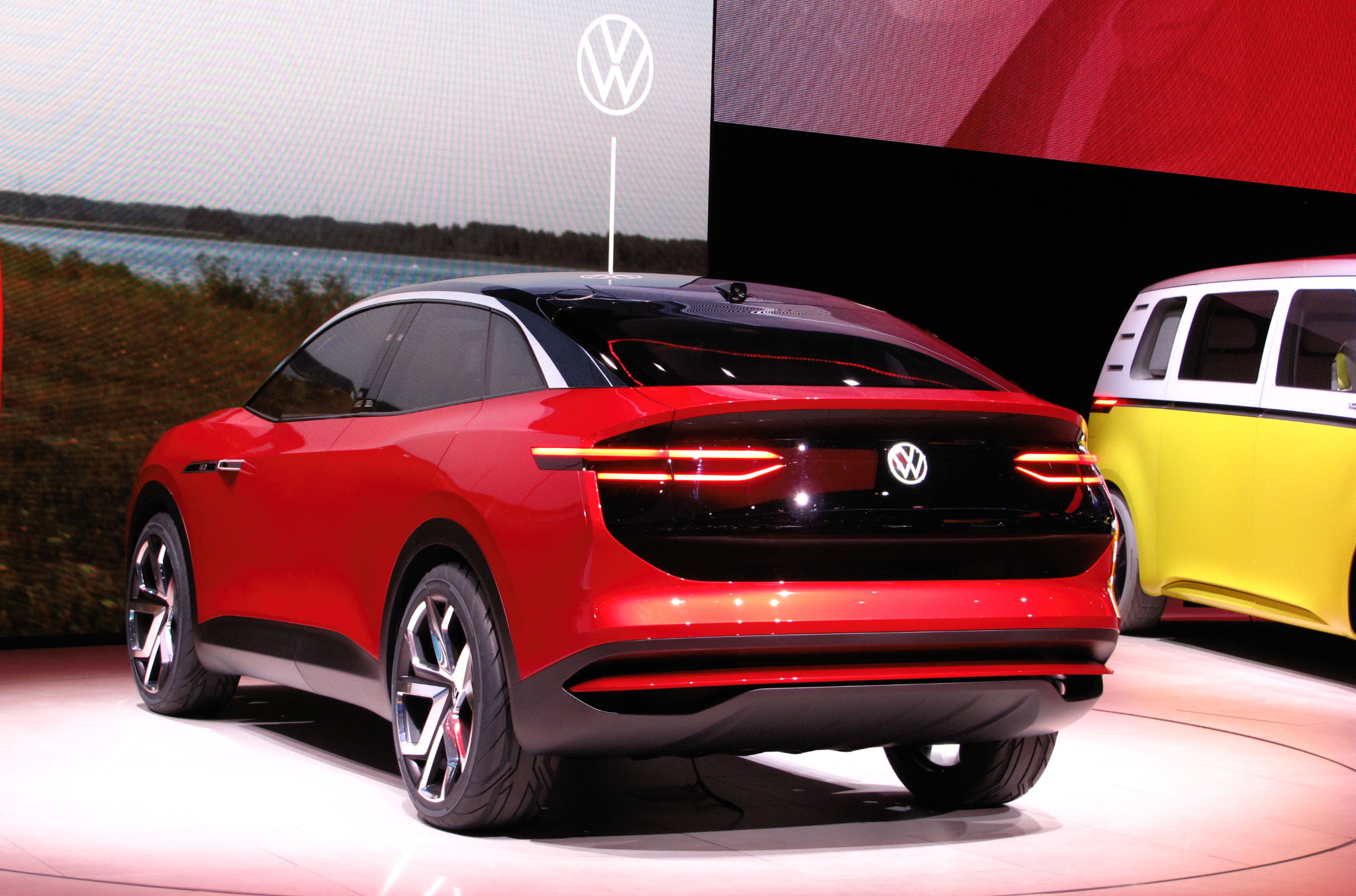
Rear view (ID. Crozz II)

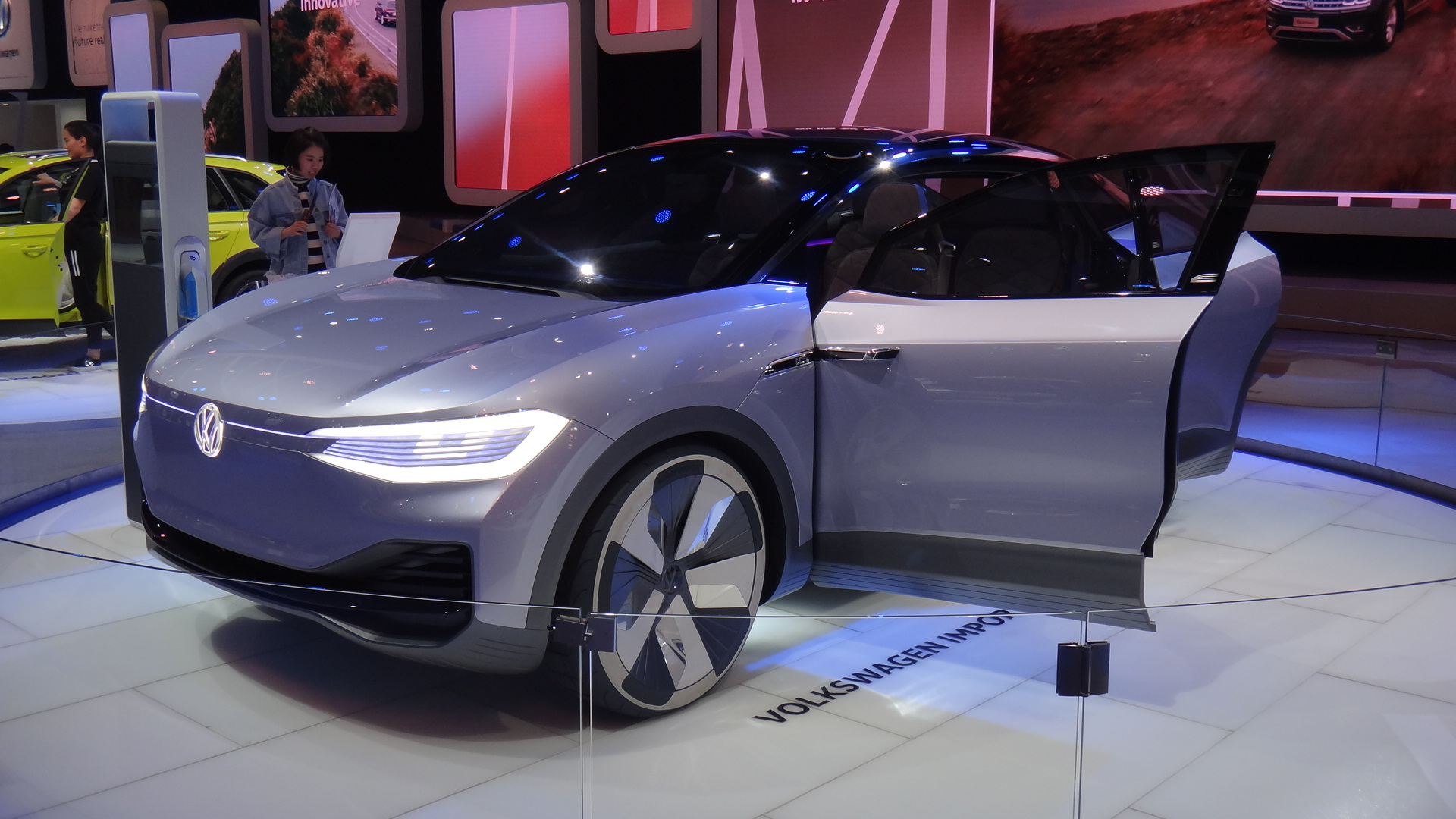
ID. Crozz at the 2017 Shanghai Auto Show

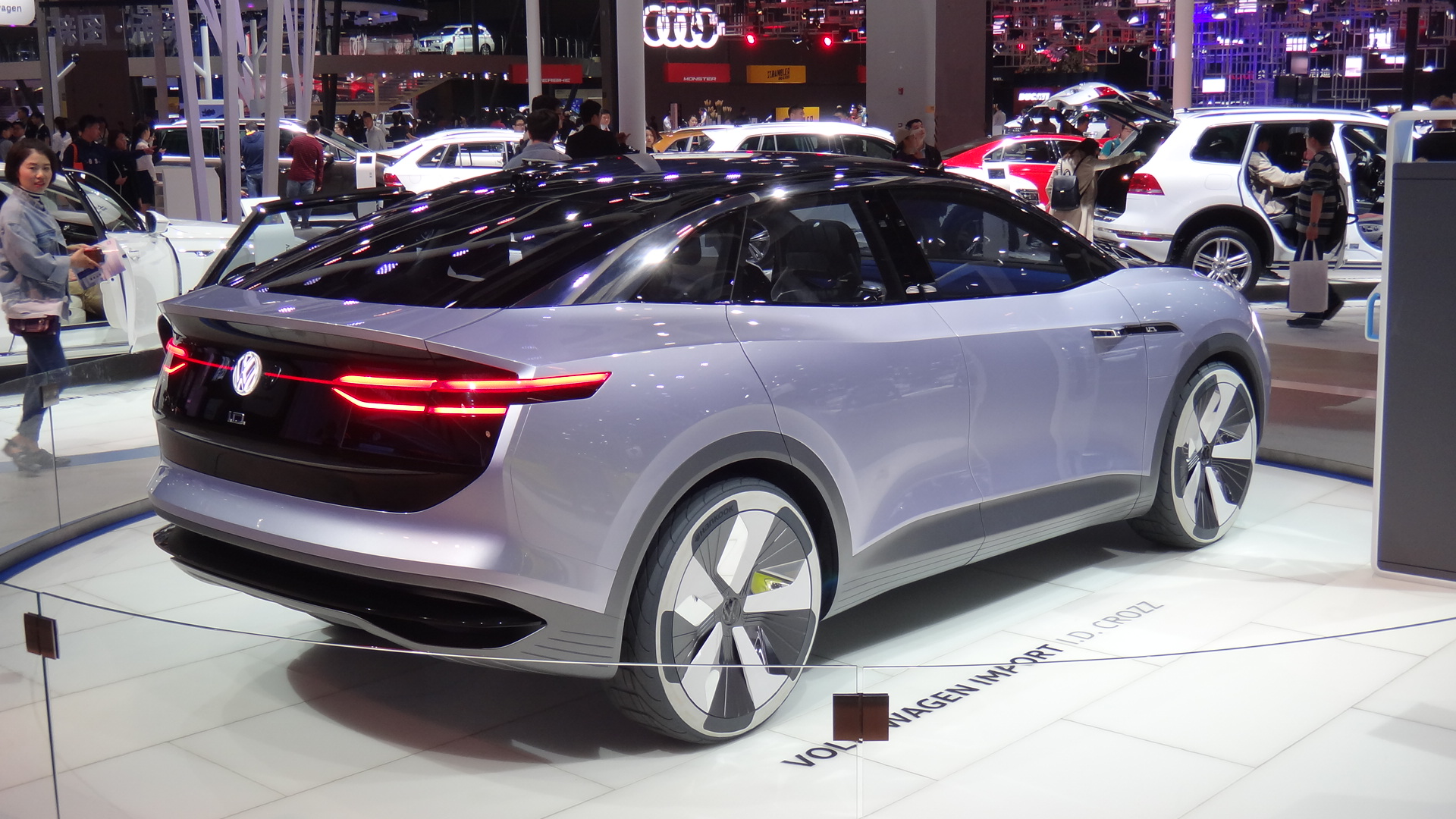
Rear view

== See also ==
- Volkswagen ID. series
- Volkswagen ID. Buzz
