= Volkswagen ID. Aura =

The Volkswagen ID. Aura is a sub-brand of Volkswagen, part of the Volkswagen ID. series and sold by its Chinese joint venture FAW-Volkswagen.

== Models ==
- Volkswagen ID. Aura L5, battery electric mid-size Sedan (since 2026)
- Volkswagen ID. Aura T6, battery electric mid-size SUV (since 2026)
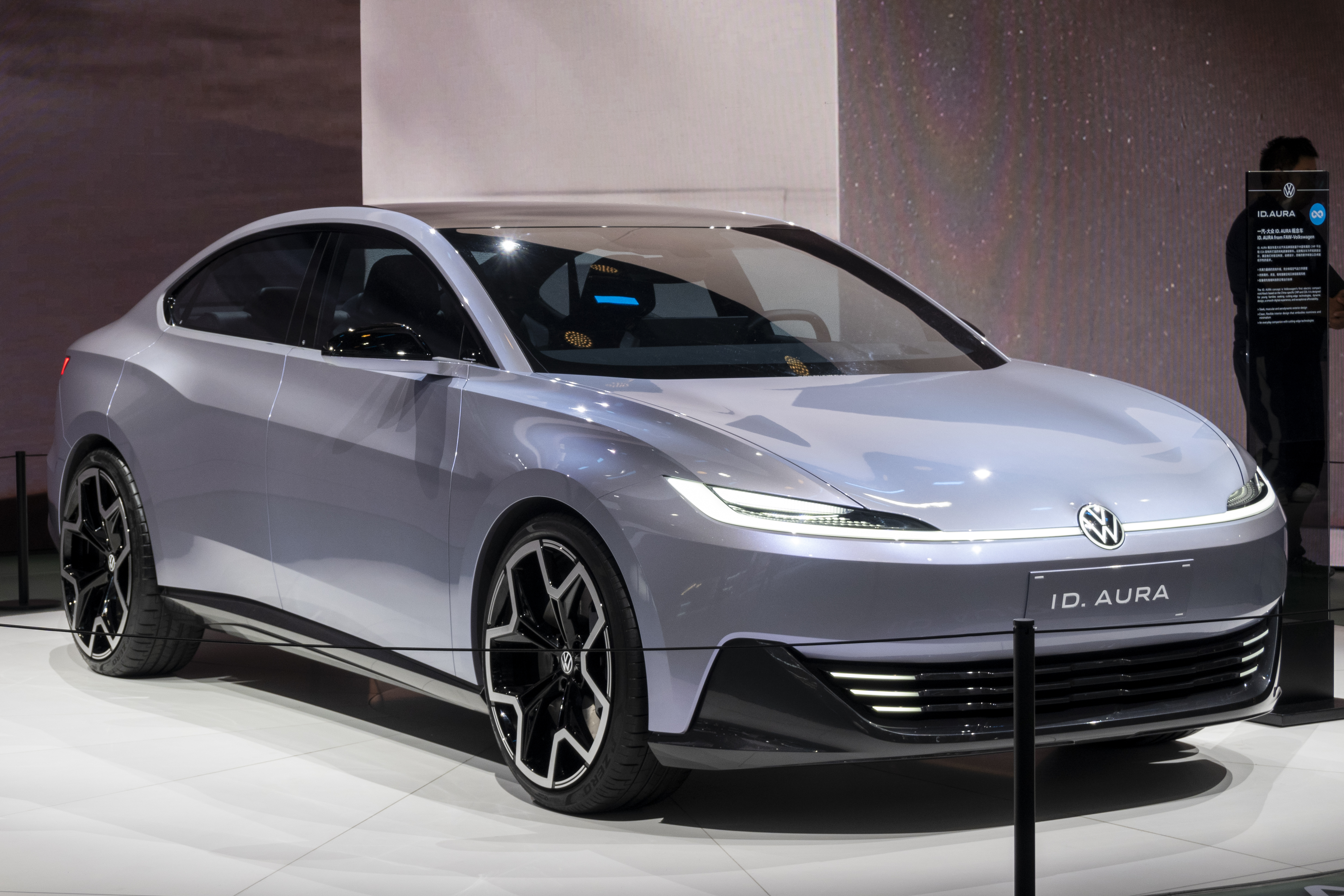
ID. Aura concept

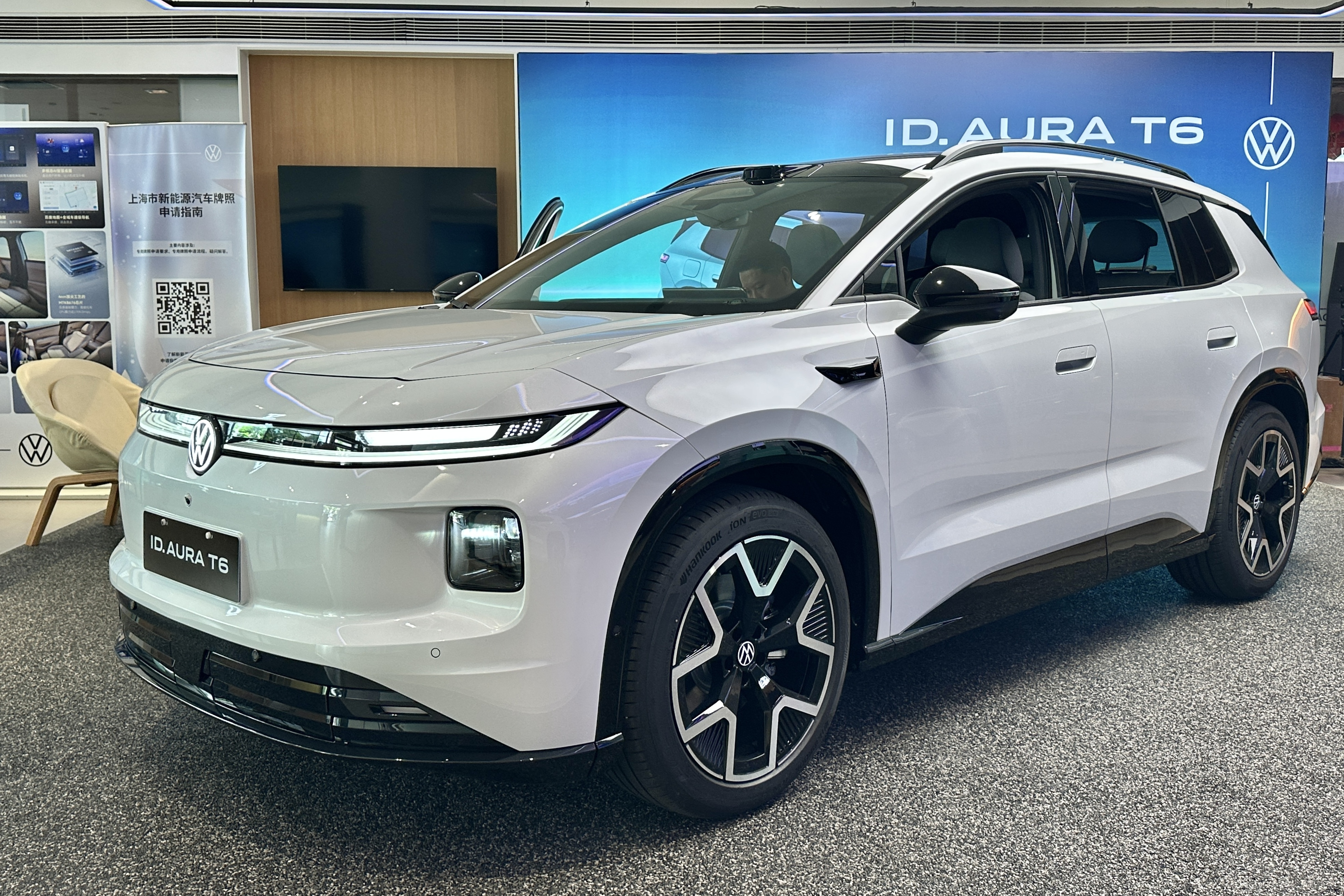
ID. Aura T6

== See also ==
- Volkswagen ID. series
- Volkswagen ID. Era of SAIC-Volkswagen
- Volkswagen ID. Unyx of Volkswagen Anhui
