= Volkswagen ID. Space Vizzion =

Concept electric car

ID. Space Vizzion concept
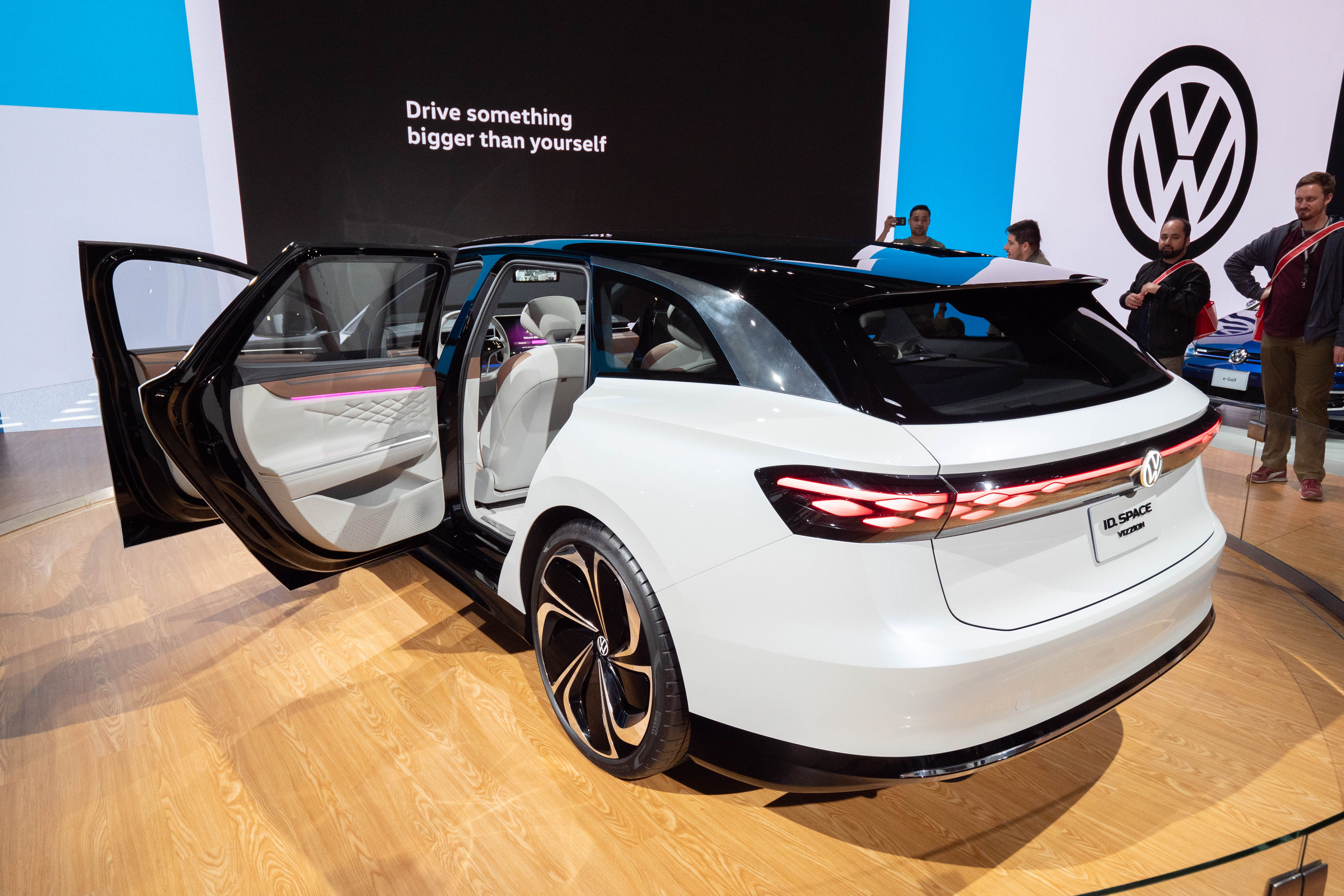

Overview
- Manufacturer: Volkswagen
- Production: 2018 (as a concept); 2023 (ID.7)

Body and chassis
- Class: Luxury car Mid-size car (D)
- Body style: 5-door Station wagon
- Layout: Dual-motors four-wheel drive
- Platform: MEB
- Doors: 5 (Conventional doors)

Powertrain
- Power output: 302 hp
- Hybrid drivetrain: All-wheel
- Battery: ?-kWh
- Electric range: up to 435 mi (700 km)

The Volkswagen ID. Space Vizzion is a concept electric vehicle wagon developed by Volkswagen. The ID. Space Vizzion is based on the MEB platform, and part of the ID. Series. The firm announced plans in 2022 to sell a production version of the vehicle by 2023 as the ID.7. The ID.7 was introduced in August 2023.

The concept wagon was shown at the 2019 LA Auto Show and is capable of three rows of seating.

== See also ==
- Volkswagen ID. Vizzion – a related sedan
- Volkswagen ID. series
