= Volkswagen ID. Vizzion =

Concept electric car

Volkswagen ID. Vizzion Concept
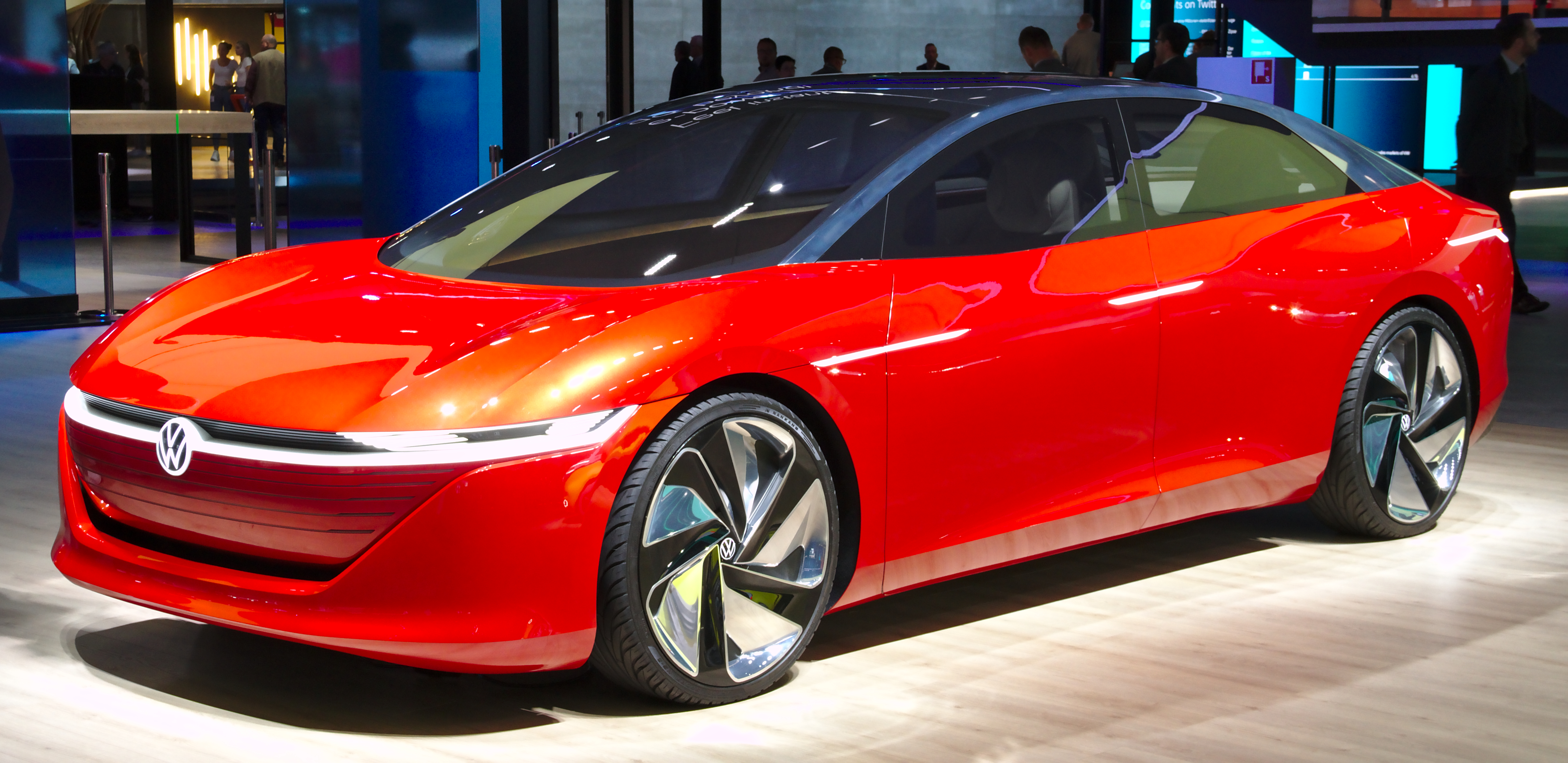
- Vizzion Concept shown at the Frankfurt Motor Show in 2019

Overview
- Manufacturer: Volkswagen
- Production: 2023–

Body and chassis
- Class: Luxury car; Mid-size car (D)
- Body style: 4-door sedan
- Layout: Dual-motors four-wheel drive
- Platform: Volkswagen Group MEB
- Doors: 4: Concept model; Conventional doors (front); Coach Doors (rear); Production model; Conventional doors (all)

Powertrain
- Power output: 302 hp
- Hybrid drivetrain: All-wheel
- Battery: 111-kWh
- Electric range: 480–640 km (300-400 miles)

The Volkswagen ID. Vizzion is a concept electric vehicle, part of Volkswagen's ID. project. The firm is planning to sell a production version of the vehicle by 2022. It should be expected that some of the claims of the Vizzion Concept, such as the autonomous level 5 driving, will very likely not make it the final 2022 production version of the vehicle. The Vizzion Concept is more likely to represent what driving in the year 2030 could be like.

== Technical statistics ==
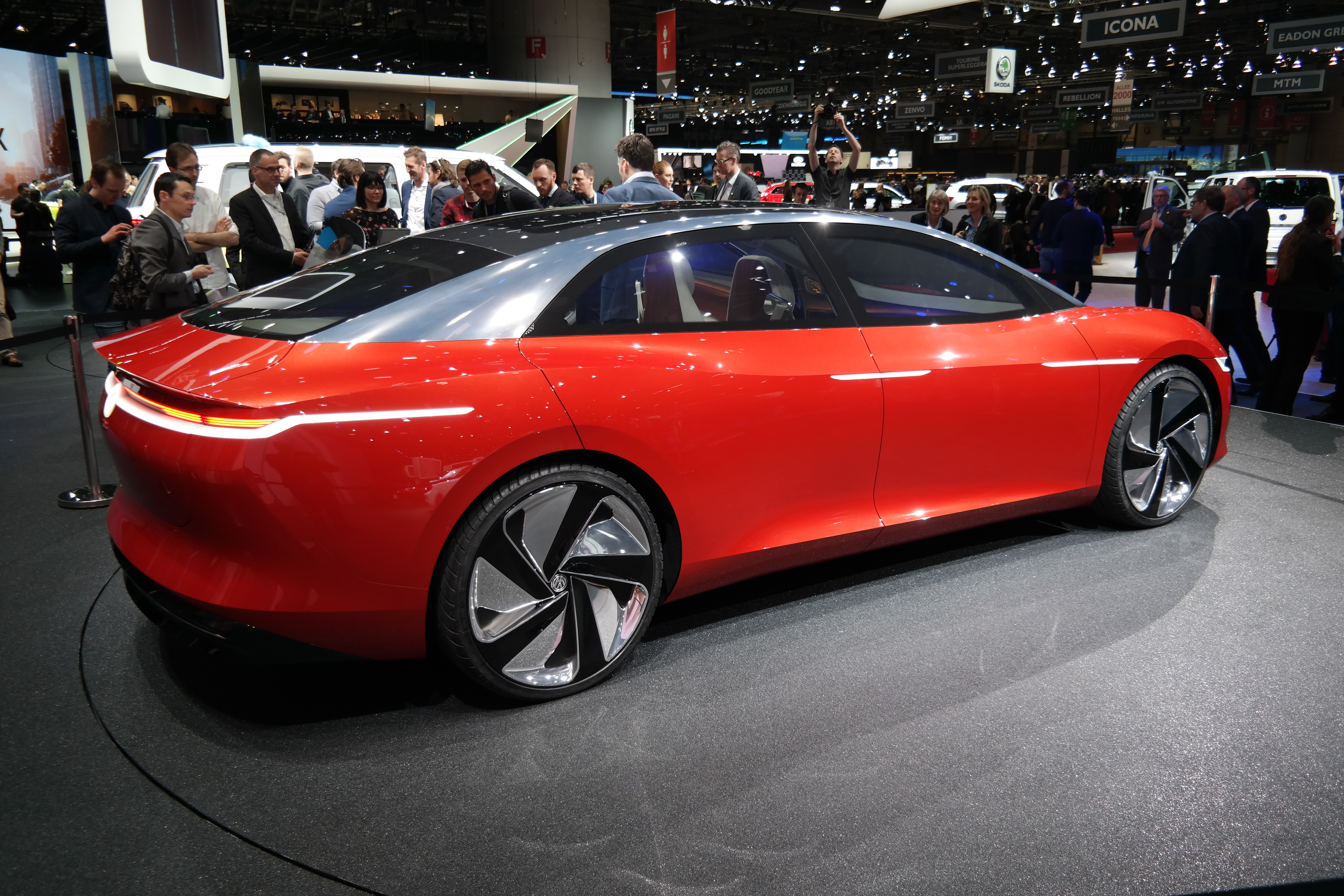
Rear view

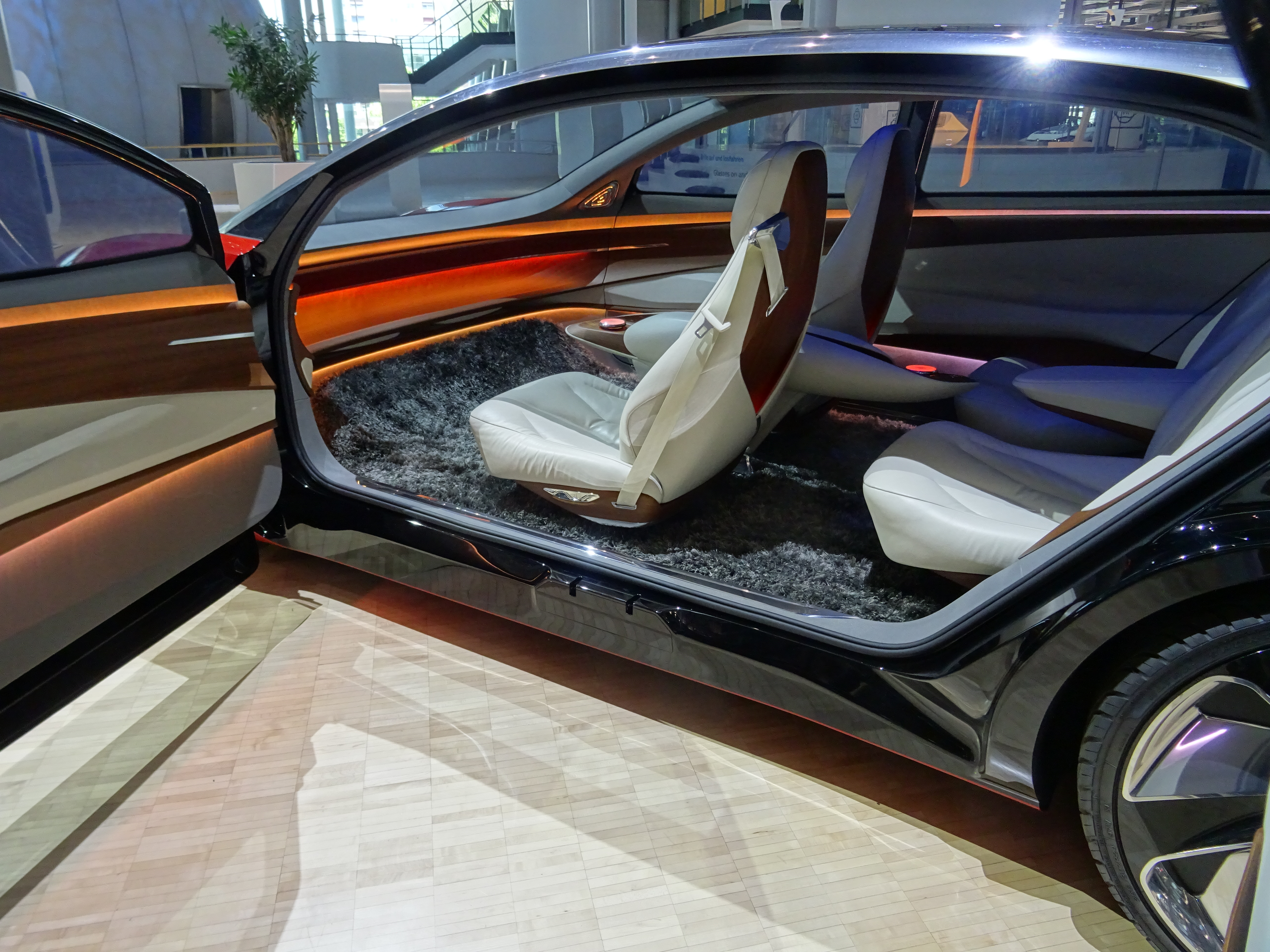
View with the doors open showing the interior

The Vizzion Concept has an all-wheel drive system, powered by the electric motors on the front and back of the vehicle for a combined total of 302 hp. The concept has a 111-kWh battery, making the Vizzion good for 300–400 miles (480–640 km). The car would be equipped with sensors that aid in the user experience (such as a 360 degree camera and a facial recognition system) as well as allow the car to drive autonomously. The headlights include 8,000 HD Matrix LEDs, allowing the car to "communicate with the outside world by projecting the image of crosswalk lines in front of the I.D. VIZZION to let pedestrians know they can safely pass in front."

== Design ==
The Vizzion Concept's design was aimed to eliminate any seams or obstructions for passengers. It features rear-opening doors and windows that lie flush with the body-work of the car, thus giving the car a futuristic look. The vehicle also features several LED strips that surround the car, highlighting the front grille, the door handles, rear fenders and the sides. The lights on the car start pulsating to let the user know that the car has detected one of its passengers' faces using integrated sensors. The interior features only two analog dials: they are multi-functional, but are primarily for adjusting the stereo. The majority of car functions are controlled through hand gestures in the heads-up display and voice controls. The car features no steering wheel or any dashboard, as the car is level 5 autonomous.

Volkswagen claims that the technology for the car is "much closer than you think", either already existing or under development by Volkswagen.

== Vizzion production vehicle (2023–2024) ==
Little is known about details and design the production version of the vehicle. The majority of information comes from official Volkswagen statements. Volkswagen says that they are aiming to start production of a toned down, more production ready version of the Vizzion in 2022, and that it will not include level 5 autonomous driving. Volkswagen also confirms that they are following through with the 302 hp, 111-kWh battery, and the 400 mile range figures of their original concept.

== In popular culture ==
In the 2023 French animated film Ladybug & Cat Noir: The Movie, Gabriel Agreste drive an ID. Vizzion, following a deal between Volkswagen and French company ZAG Inc.

== See also ==
- Volkswagen ID. Space Vizzion – a related wagon
- Volkswagen ID. series
