= Volkswagen ID. Aura L5 =

Battery electric mid-size liftback sedan

Overview
- Manufacturer: Volkswagen
- Production: 2026 (to commence)
- Assembly: China: Foshan (FAW-Volkswagen)

Body and chassis
- Class: Mid-size car
- Body style: 5-door liftback sedan
- Platform: Compact Main Platform (CMP)

Dimensions
- Wheelbase: 2,820 mm (111.0 in)
- Length: 4,883 mm (192.2 in)
- Width: 1,881–1,915 mm (74.1–75.4 in)
- Height: 1,506 mm (59.3 in)

The Volkswagen ID. Aura L5 (Chinese: 大众ID. AURA L5; pinyin: Dàzhòng ID. AURA L5) is a battery electric mid-size car produced by Volkswagen under its FAW-Volkswagen joint venture. It is sold under Volkswagen's ID. Aura sub-brand.

== Overview ==
The ID. Aura L5 was initially previewed by the ID. AURA concept at the Auto Shanghai 2025.

It is the second vehicle in the battery electric ID. Aura sub-brand, after the ID. Aura T6. It was first revealed through MIIT filings on 17 October 2026.

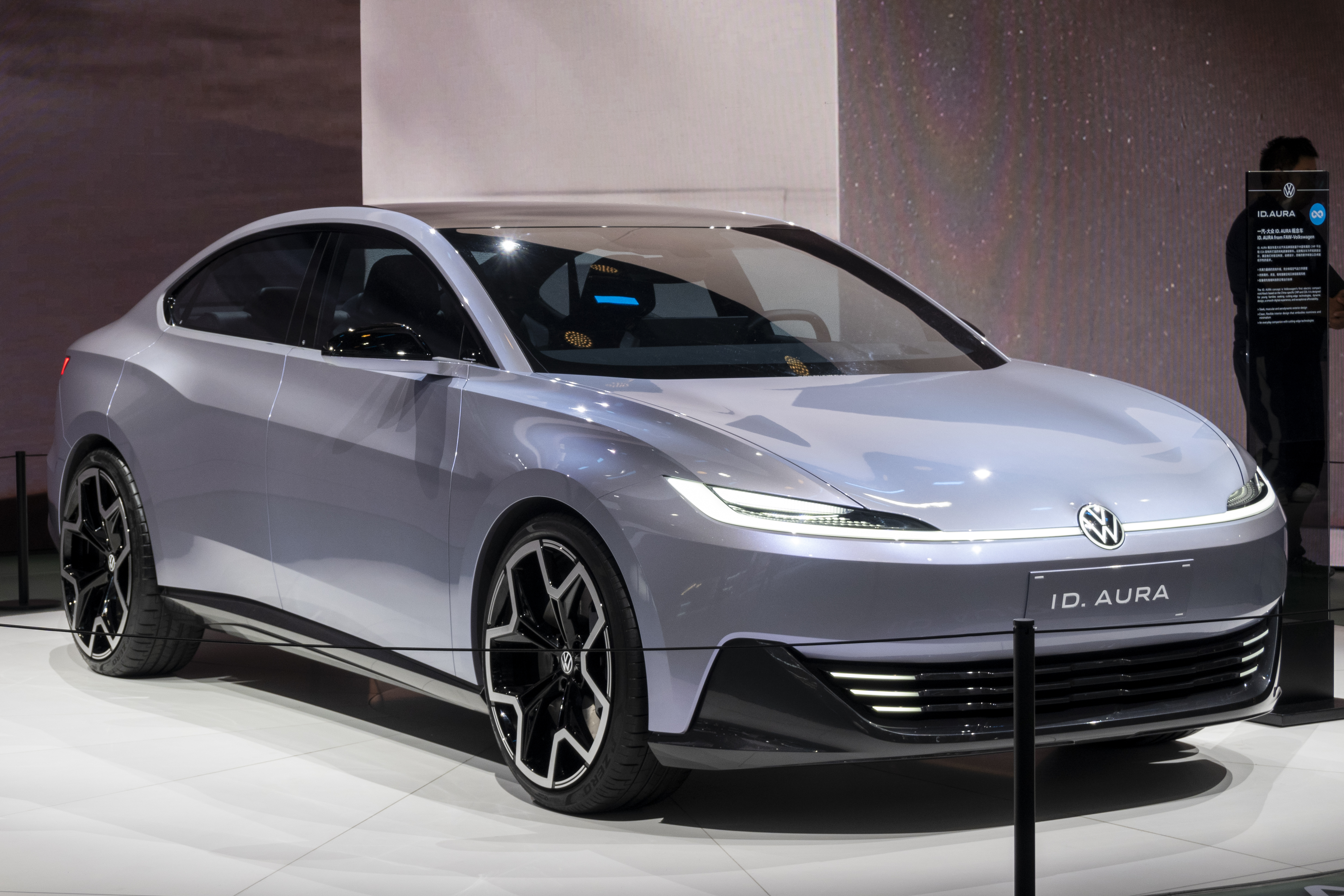
The Volkswagen ID. Aura concept introduced at Auto Shanghai 2025 directly previewed the Aura L5.

Rear view of ID. Aura concept

=== Design ===
The ID. Aura L5's exterior uses a variant of Volkswagen's design language, shared with the ID. Aura T6. Design elements include front and rear light bars, split headlights, semi-hidden door handles and seamless windows. It features a fastback profile and has a tailgate which can open up to 70 degrees.

=== Powertrain ===
Two powertrains are offered with either a single or dual motor configuration. All variants use the same electric motor (including dual-motor variants) that produces 155 kW (208 hp; 211 PS). Its top speed is 175 km/h (109 mph).
