= Volkswagen ID.6 =

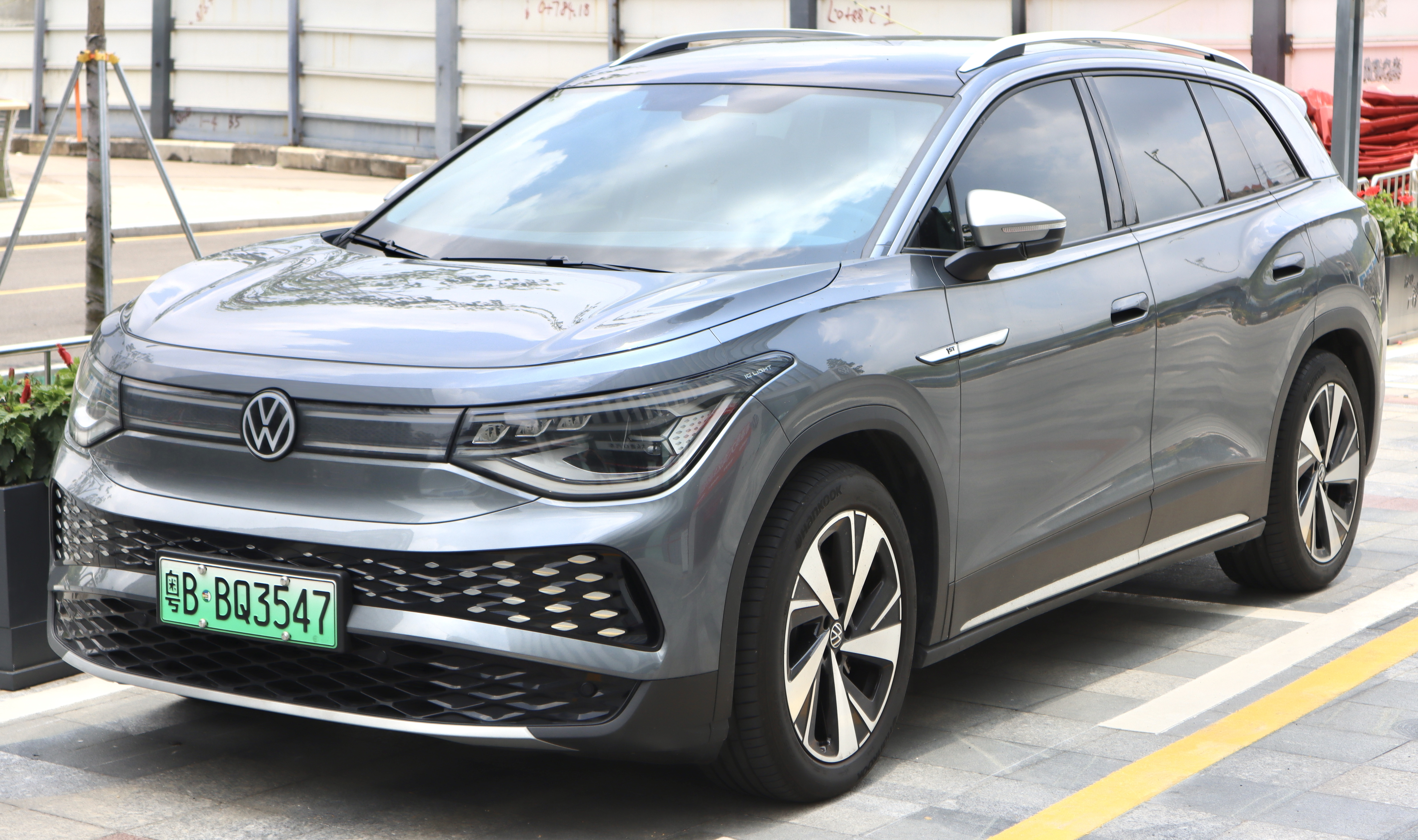
- Volkswagen ID.6 X

Overview
- Manufacturer: Volkswagen
- Production: 2021–2026 (ID.6 Crozz); 2021–present (ID.6 X)
- Assembly: China: Anting (SAIC-VW, ID.6 X); Foshan (FAW-VW, ID.6 Crozz)
- Designer: Nitin Bhikha

Body and chassis
- Class: Mid-size crossover SUV (D)
- Body style: 5-door SUV
- Layout: Rear-motor, rear-wheel drive Dual-motor, all-wheel drive
- Platform: Volkswagen Group MEB
- Related: Volkswagen ID.4; Audi Q5 e-tron Audi Q4 e-tron Škoda Enyaq; Škoda Peaq

Powertrain
- Electric motor: 150 kW APP 310 PMSM
- Power output: 132–230 kW (179–313 PS; 177–309 hp)
- Battery: 45–77 kWh (usable), 55–82 kWh (total) NMC CATL
- Electric range: 436–588 km (271–365 mi) (NEDC); 460–617 km (286–383 mi) (CLTC)

Dimensions
- Wheelbase: 2,965 mm (116.7 in)
- Length: 4,876 mm (192.0 in)
- Width: 1,848 mm (72.8 in)
- Height: 1,680 mm (66.1 in)
- Curb weight: 2,280 kg (5,027 lb)

The Volkswagen ID.6 (Chinese: 大众ID.6; pinyin: Dàzhòng ID.6) is a battery electric mid-size crossover SUV with three-row seating produced by Volkswagen in China from 2021. It is based on the MEB platform, and part of the ID. series electric vehicle line-up. In China, the FAW-Volkswagen joint venture will produce and market the ID.6 Crozz, whereas SAIC-Volkswagen will build and market the ID.6 X with a slightly altered styling. As of April 2022, it is the second largest vehicle of the Volkswagen ID. series, and the second largest built on the MEB platform.

== Overview ==
=== Pre-production ===
The ID.6 is based on the Volkswagen I.D. Roomzz concept. This was first presented at the Shanghai Motor Show in April 2019. The concept is a family SUV, based on the MEB platform, with sliding doors at the front and rear with opposite opening. The concept car is powered by two electric motors placed on each axle, with a power of 75 kW (102 PS; 101 hp) at the front and 150 kW (204 PS; 201 hp) at the rear for a power cumulative of 225 kW (306 PS; 302 hp), powered by a lithium-ion battery with a capacity of 82 kWh offering a maximum autonomy of 450 km (280 mi).

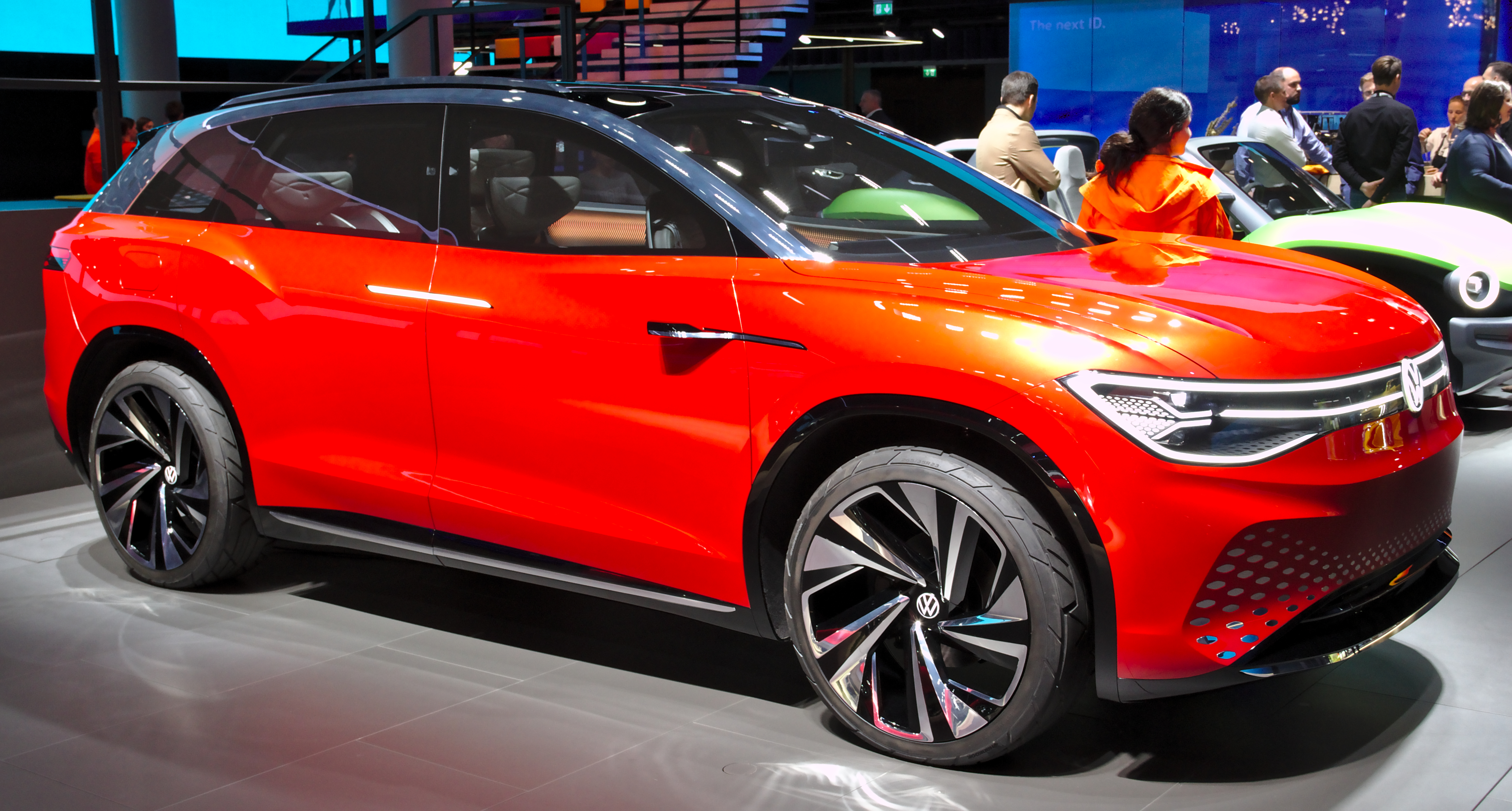
Volkswagen ID. Roomzz

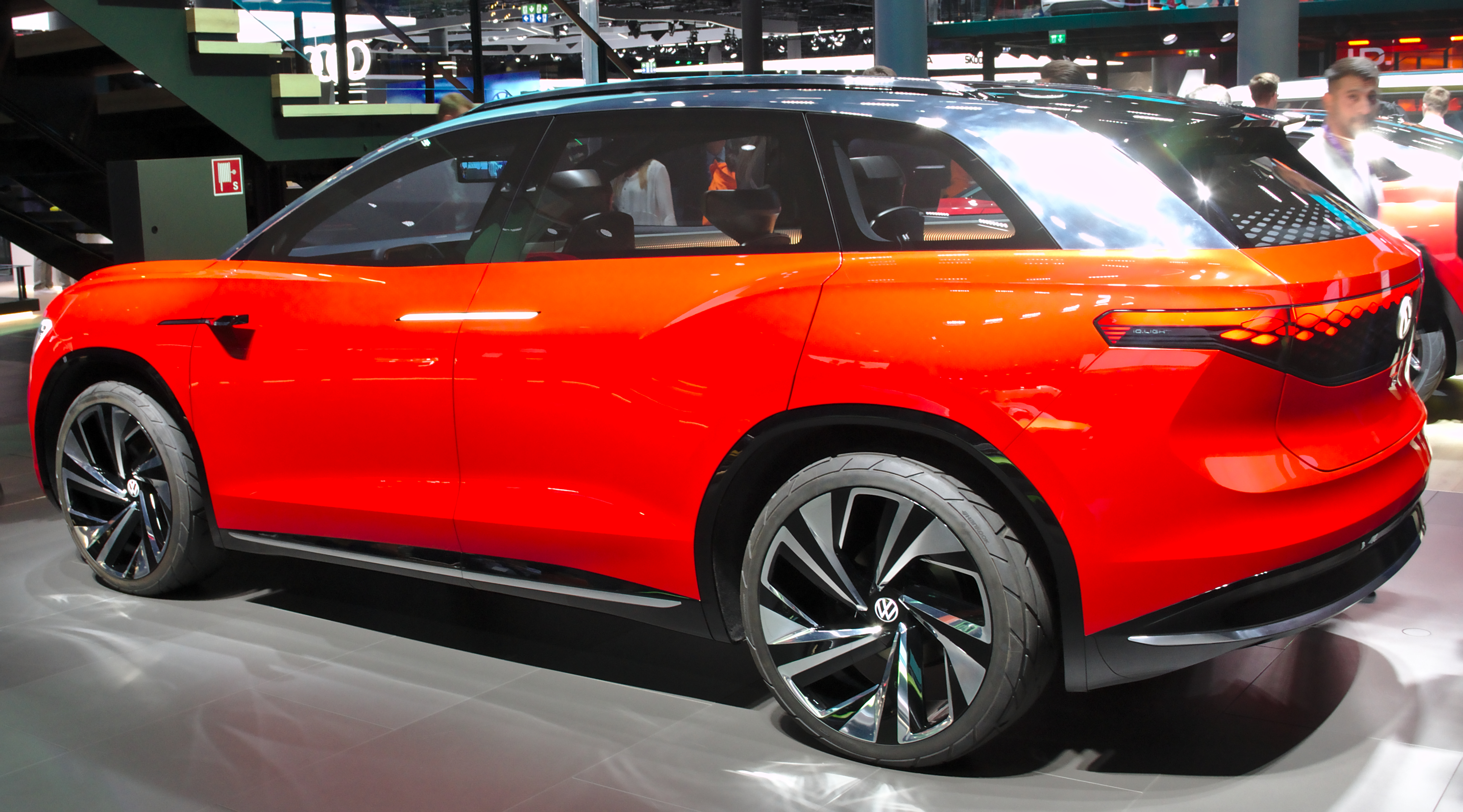
Volkswagen ID. Roomzz (rear)

=== Production version ===
The ID.6 was revealed on 17 April 2021 for the Chinese market. Two versions with different front and rear fascia styling is announced, which are the ID.6 Crozz produced by FAW-VW and the ID.6 X produced by SAIC-VW. The ID.6 is built on the VW Group MEB platform shared with the Volkswagen ID.4, Škoda Enyaq iV as well as the Audi Q4 e-tron. To accommodate the third row, VW has stretched the ID.6 to 4,876 mm (192.0 in), making it nearly 300 mm (11.8 in) longer than the ID.4, with a 2,965 mm (116.7 in) wheelbase supporting its length.

The base version is equipped with a single electric motor powering the rear wheels capable of 132 kW (179 PS; 177 hp), with a claimed 0–100 km/h (62 mph) figure of 9.3 seconds or an option of 150 kW (204 PS; 201 hp) with a 0–100 km/h (62 mph) figure of 9.1 seconds. The dual-motor model is capable of 225 kW (306 PS; 302 hp) and 310 N⋅m (229 lb⋅ft) of torque, with 6.6 seconds needed to reach 0–100 km/h (62 mph) with a top speed of 160 km/h (99 mph). VW will sell the ID.6 in China with a choice between six or seven seats while alloy wheel sizes will range from 19 to 21 inches.

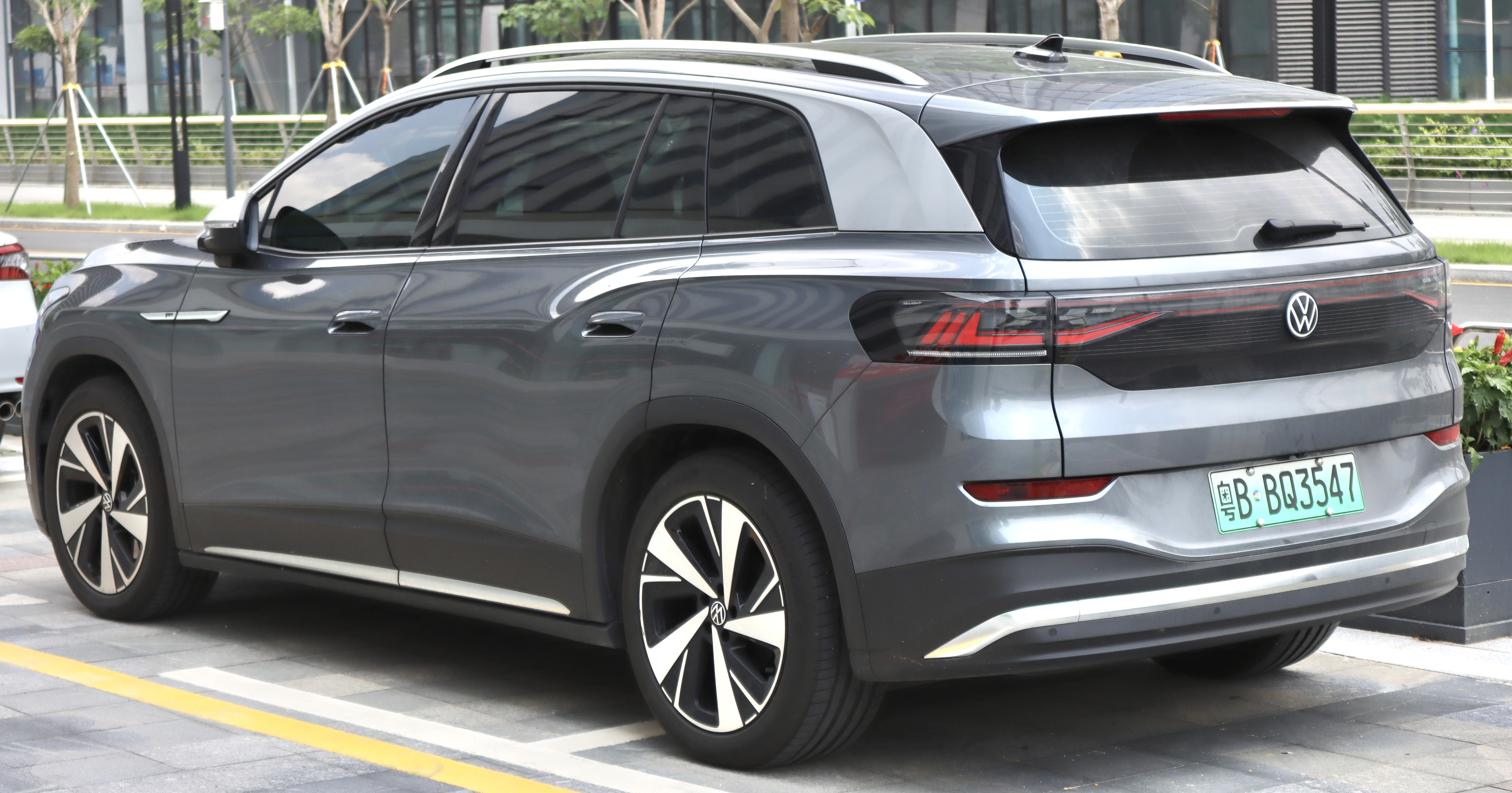
Volkswagen ID.6 X (rear view)

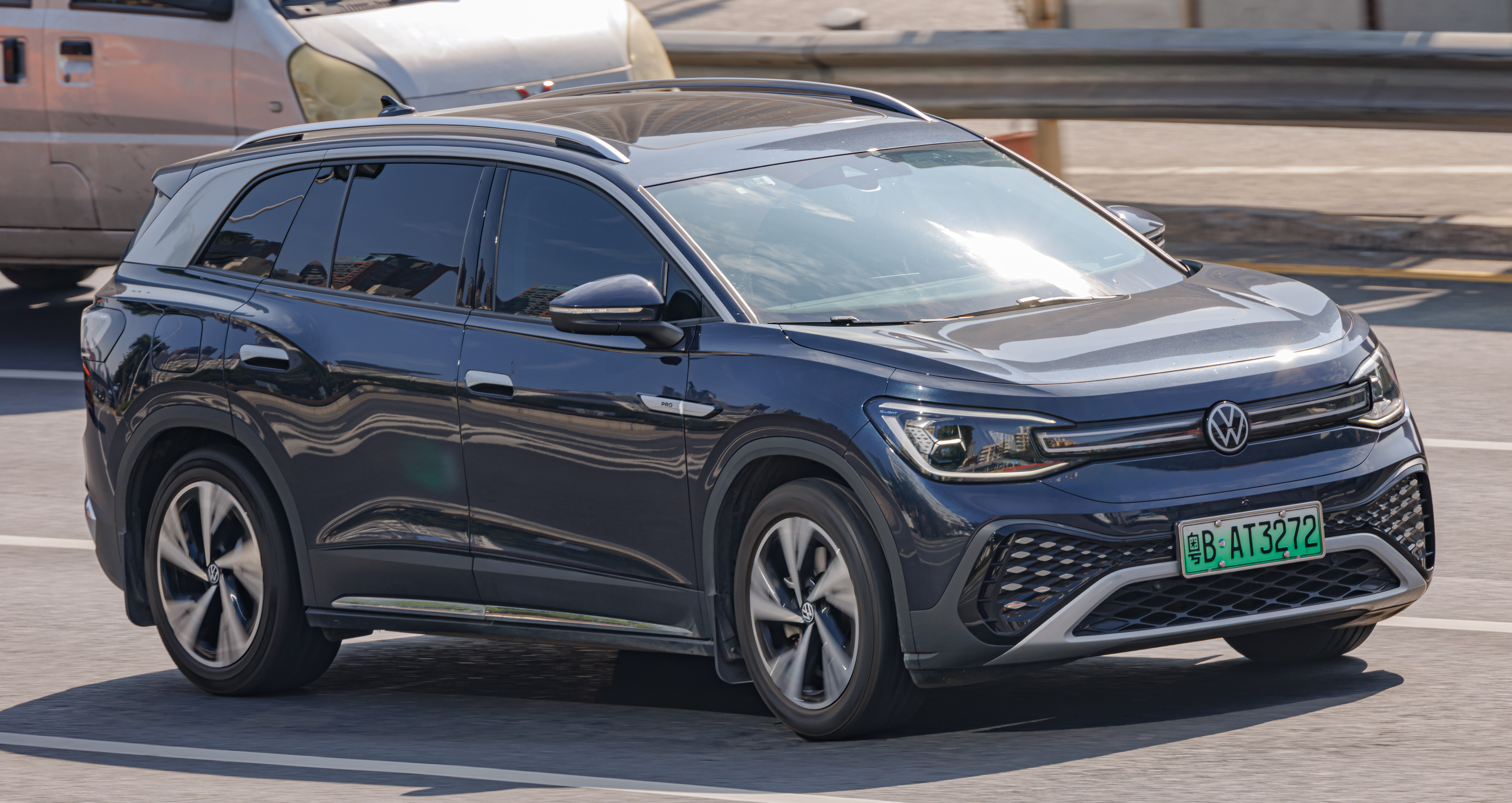
Volkswagen ID.6 Crozz

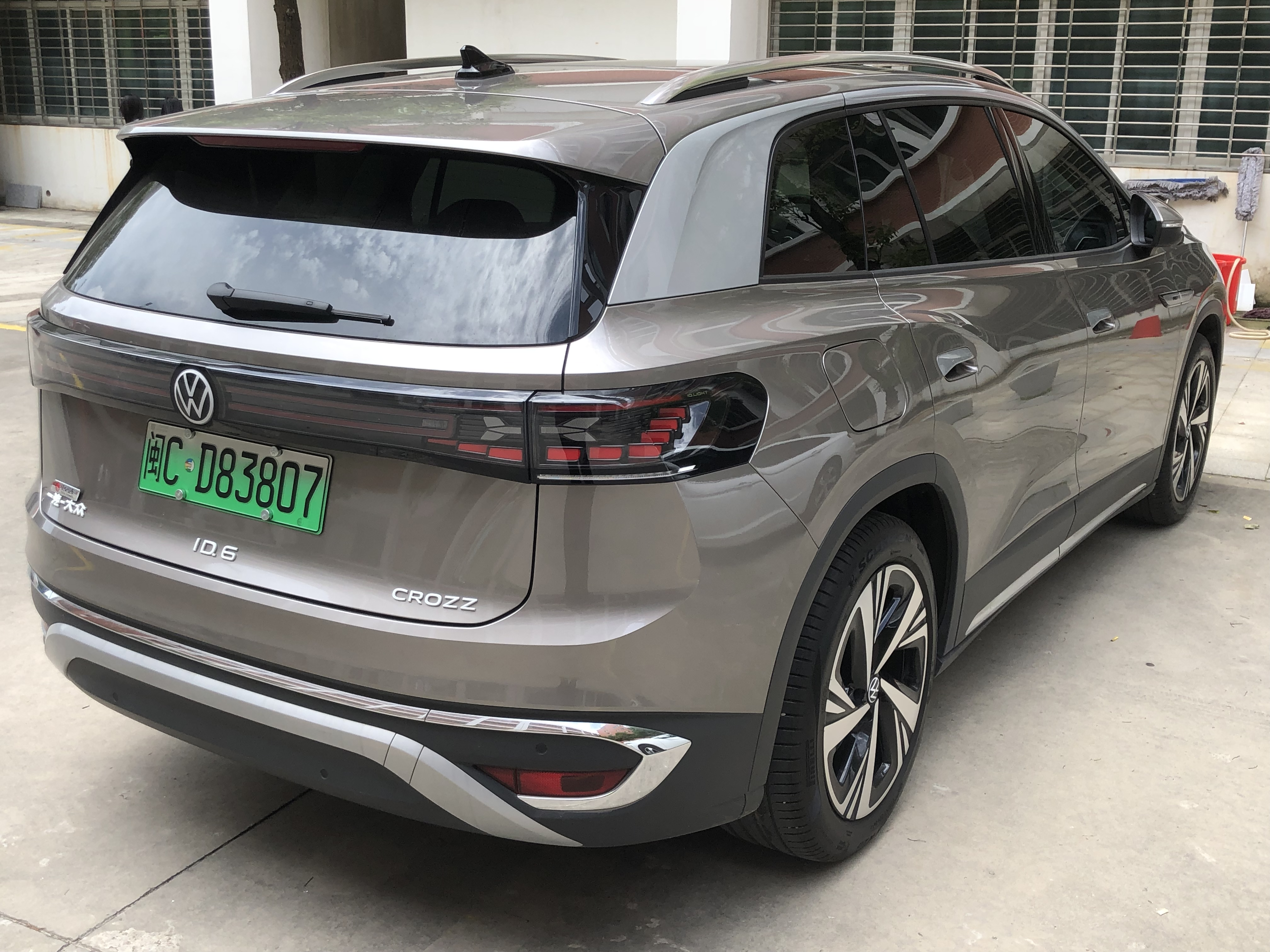
Volkswagen ID.6 Crozz (rear)

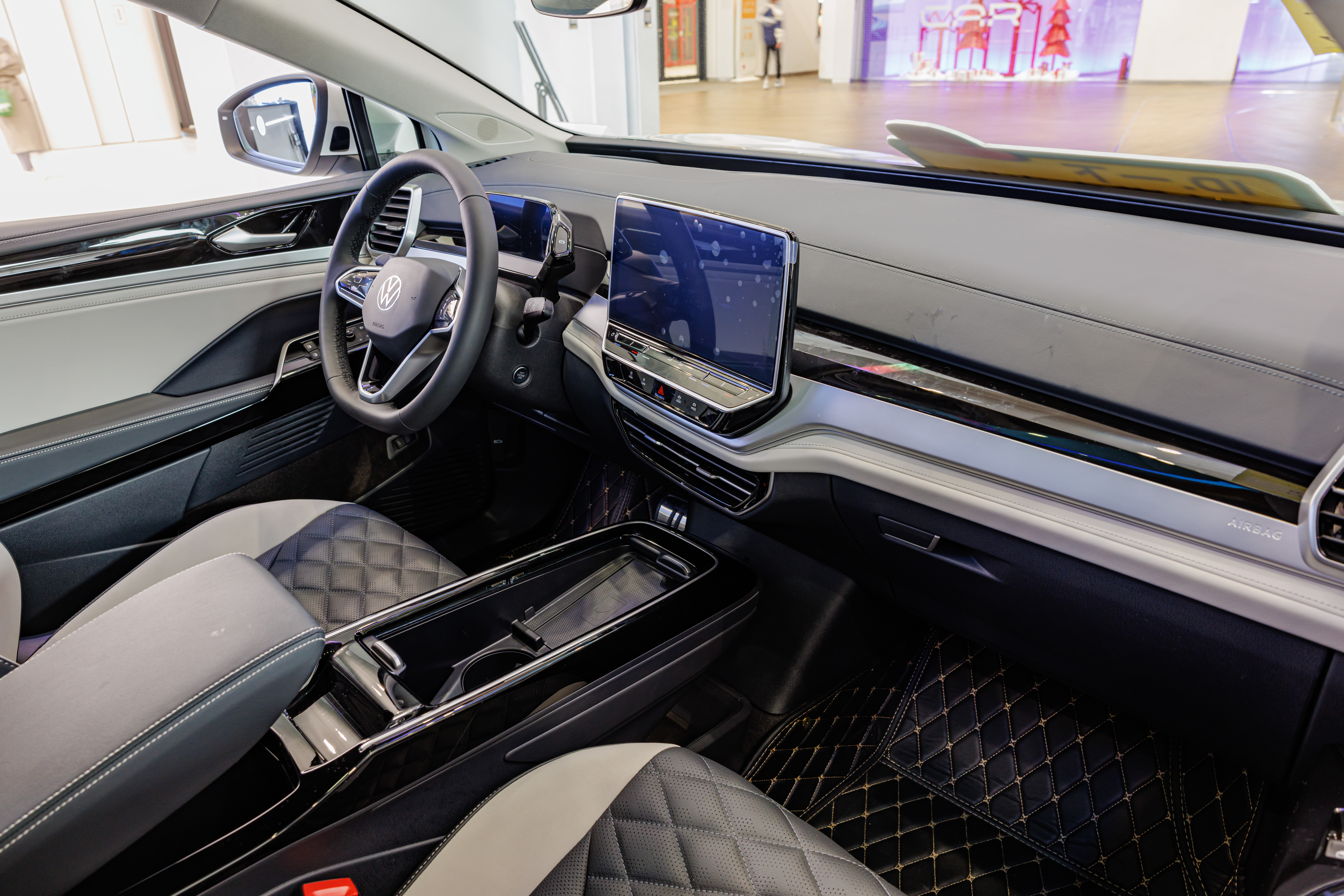
Interior

== Powertrain ==
Specifications
Model	Year	Battery		Power	Torque	Range		0–80% charge	0–50 km/h (31 mph)	Top speed	Kerb weight
Model	Year	Type	Weight	Power	Torque	CLTC	NEDC	0–80% charge	0–50 km/h (31 mph)	Top speed	Kerb weight
ID.6 Crozz
Base	2021–25	62.6kWh NMC CATL	368 kg (811 lb)	177 hp (132 kW; 179 PS)	310 N⋅m (229 lb⋅ft)	480 km (298 mi)	439 km (273 mi)	40 min	3.4 sec	160 km/h (99 mph)	2,161 kg (4,764 lb)
Long range	2021–24	84.8kWh NMC CATL	476 kg (1,049 lb)	201 hp (150 kW; 204 PS)	310 N⋅m (229 lb⋅ft)	601 km (373 mi)	565–586 km (351–364 mi)	40 min	3.5 sec	160 km/h (99 mph)	2,290 kg (5,049 lb)
Long range	2024–25	80.4kWh NMC CATL	480 kg (1,058 lb)	201 hp (150 kW; 204 PS)	310 N⋅m (229 lb⋅ft)	601 km (373 mi)	—	40 min	3.5 sec	160 km/h (99 mph)	2,290 kg (5,049 lb)
Long range AWD	2021–24	84.8kWh NMC CATL	476 kg (1,049 lb)	309 hp (230 kW; 313 PS)	472 N⋅m (348 lb⋅ft)	560 km (348 mi)	516 km (321 mi)	40 min	2.6 sec	160 km/h (99 mph)	2,383 kg (5,254 lb)
Long range AWD	2024–25	80.4kWh NMC CATL	480 kg (1,058 lb)	309 hp (230 kW; 313 PS)	472 N⋅m (348 lb⋅ft)	560 km (348 mi)	—	40 min	2.6 sec	160 km/h (99 mph)	2,383 kg (5,254 lb)
ID.6 X
Base	2021–24	63.2kWh NMC CATL	367 kg (809 lb)	177 hp (132 kW; 179 PS)	310 N⋅m (229 lb⋅ft)	460 km (286 mi)	436 km (271 mi)	40 min	3.4 sec	160 km/h (99 mph)	2,150 kg (4,740 lb)
Long range	2021–24	83.4kWh NMC CATL	476 kg (1,049 lb)	201 hp (150 kW; 204 PS)	310 N⋅m (229 lb⋅ft)	617 km (383 mi)	588 km (365 mi)	40 min	3.5 sec	160 km/h (99 mph)	2,280 kg (5,027 lb)
Long range AWD	2021–23	83.4kWh NMC CATL	476 kg (1,049 lb)	309 hp (230 kW; 313 PS)	472 N⋅m (348 lb⋅ft)	540 km (336 mi)	510 km (317 mi)	40 min	2.6 sec	160 km/h (99 mph)	2,395 kg (5,280 lb)

== Production ==
Year	Production	China		
Year	Production	ID.6 X	ID.6 Crozz	Total
2021	20,461			
2022	38,846			
2023	15,926	5,924	11,410	17,334
2024		2,230	3,845	6,075
2025		168	907	1,075
