= Volkswagen Group China =

Division of Volkswagen Group in China

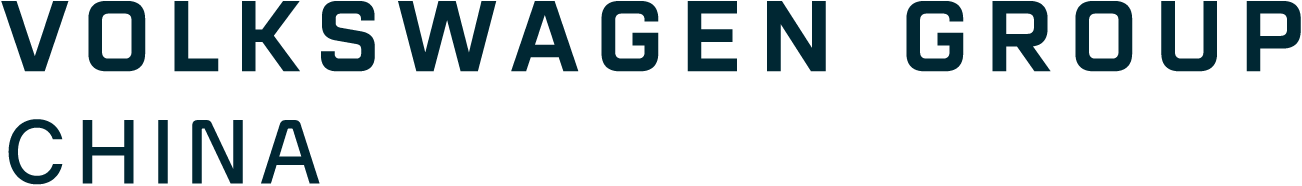

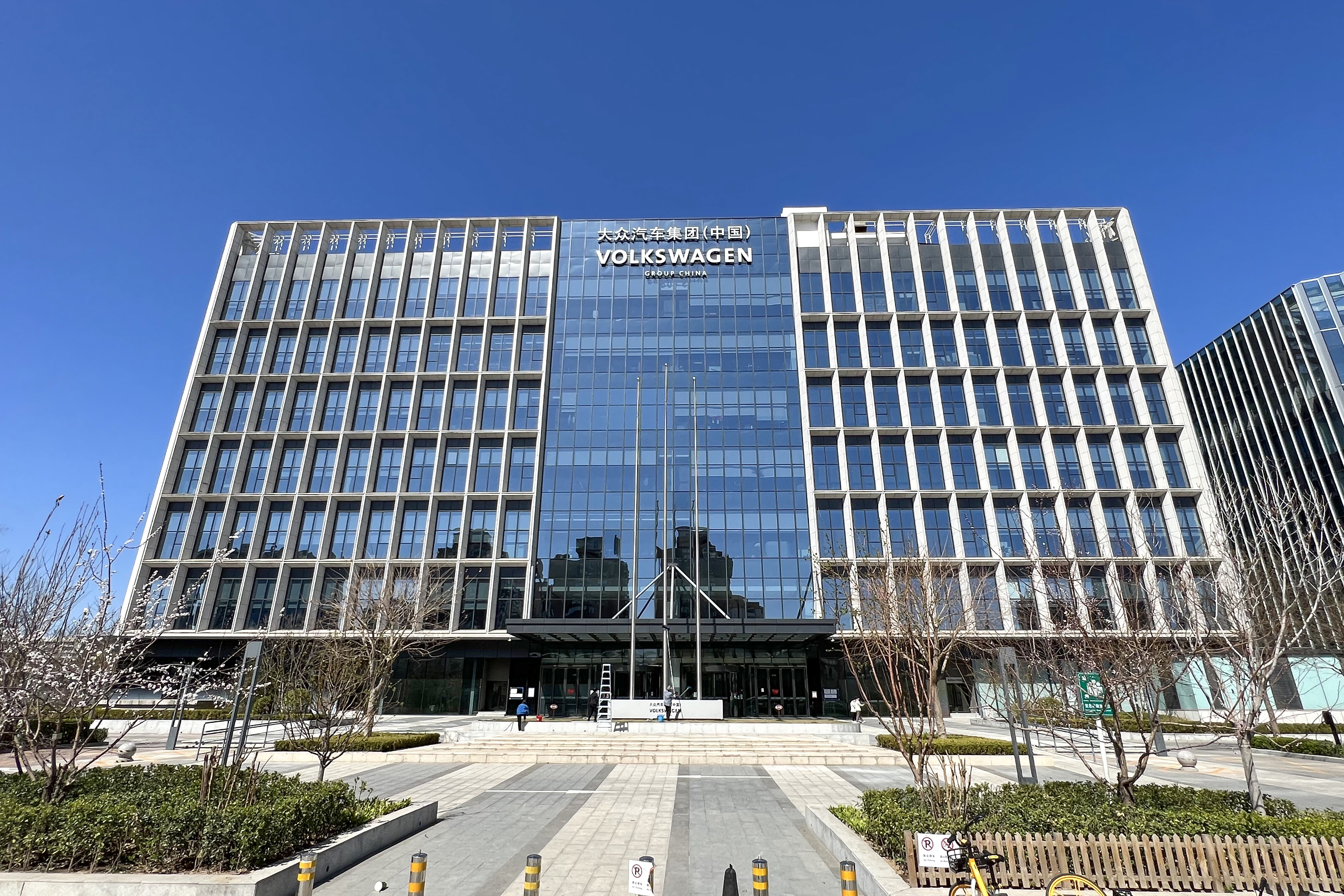
- Company headquarters
- Native name: 大众汽车集团（中国）
- Type: Subsidiary
- Industry: Automotive
- Founded: 1985; 41 years ago
- Headquarters: Beijing, China
- Number of locations: Joint Ventures and wholly owned enterprises in Beijing, Changchun, Shanghai, Chengdu, Nanjing, Dalian and Hong Kong
- Area served: Greater China
- Key people: Ralf Brandstätter (CEO)
- Products: automobiles, engines, transmissions and spare parts; Volkswagen Group brands import
- Brands: Volkswagen; Audi; Škoda; Jetta
- Services: Automotive financial services
- Operating income: € 2.621 billion (proportionate, 2023)
- Number of employees: ~90,000 (2024)
- Parent: Volkswagen Group
- Subsidiaries: 14 subsidiaries
- Website: volkswagengroupchina.com.cn

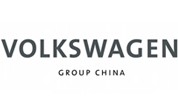
Volkswagen Group China logo used from 2007-2023

Volkswagen Group China (VGC; Chinese: 大众汽车集团（中国）) is the Chinese subsidiary of the German automotive concern Volkswagen Group in the People's Republic of China.

Volkswagen Group China sold around 2.6 million cars in the Chinese market in 2025, and Volkswagen was the largest car brand in China by sales until 2022, when it was overtaken by BYD. The Chinese market is Volkswagen's second-largest market, accounting for around 30% of Volkswagen's global sales in 2024. Operations of Volkswagen in China include the production, sales and services of whole cars, parts and components, engines and transmission systems, and the sales and service of imported cars. The company's locally manufactured and imported vehicles are sold under various brand names such as Volkswagen, Audi, Škoda, Bentley, and Lamborghini in China. Its market share has declined in the 2020s due to the rapid adoption of electric vehicles and increasing competition from Chinese brands, falling from 19% in 2019 to 14.5% in 2024.

Volkswagen Group China is the largest, earliest, and the most successful international partner in China's automotive industry. It started its connection with China as early as in 1978, and has been taking the leading position in the Chinese automotive market for more than 25 years. Its first joint venture in China, Shanghai Volkswagen Automotive Co., Ltd., was established in October 1984. This joint venture, now called SAIC Volkswagen. was in the process of building an electric-car plant in Anting, near Shanghai by late 2018; it was expected to make 300,000 e-vehicles per year, starting in 2020.

The second joint venture, FAW-Volkswagen Automotive Company Ltd. was established in Changchun in February 1991. It manufactures VW and Audi cars. In 2018, an executive with FAW-Volkswagen's Audi division said that two million China-made Audi cars will be sold in the country by 2020. As of the end of 2017, the total to date was 777,000.

== History ==
In 1984, Volkswagen signed a 25-year contract to make passenger cars in Shanghai. Since, at that time, vehicle manufacturers could not own a majority stake in a manufacturing plant, Volkswagen's venture took the limit of 50 per cent foreign ownership.

Today, the Group has 16 representative companies in the country, undertaking parts delivery and service provision for both customers and industry in addition to vehicle production and import.

By May 2004, Volkswagen Group had concentrated its strengths in the founding of Volkswagen Group China (VGC), which is governed by a six-member management team responsible for the areas of sales and marketing, technology, purchasing, personnel and governmental relations as well as finance. VGC's tasks include supervision of the Chinese associated companies of the Volkswagen Group, and the set-up of new business segments.

== Operations ==
Volkswagen Group, via its Volkswagen Group China division, has 16 subsidiaries in China, with Shanghai Automotive Industry Corporation (SAIC), and First Automotive Works (FAW) being the two major Chinese partner companies.

=== SAIC-Volkswagen ===
In 1984, a joint venture (JV) was established between Volkswagen Group and Shanghai Automotive Industry Corporation (now SAIC Motor), creating Shanghai Volkswagen Automotive Co., Ltd. (SVW), headquartered in Anting, Shanghai. Equity holdings are split (as of 2010) - Volkswagen AG (40%), Volkswagen (China) Invest (10%), SAIC (50%). This a fixed term venture, of 45 years, running until 2030.

Shanghai Volkswagen Automotive Co., Ltd. (SVW) is the first car-making joint venture since China began its reform, and debut to the outside world, and is located in Anting International Auto City on the northwest outskirts of Shanghai. Producing cars under the Volkswagen and the Škoda brands, SVW currently offers a total of twelve model series. By October 2009, SAIC Volkswagen (SVW) had produced a cumulative total of five million vehicles. At that time, this output represented the largest fleet of vehicles from a single manufacturer within the Chinese market.

	Shanghai Volkswagen Automotive Company
founding year	1984 (production start: 1985)
headquarters	Shanghai
equity holders	Volkswagen AG (40%), VW (China) Invest (10%), SAIC (50%)
employees	22,000 (31.12.2010)
products	Volkswagen: Tiguan L (and Tiguan L Pro), Touran L, Passat (NMS MQB China-only), Passat Pro, Lavida (MQB: Sedan and Gran Lavida), Lavida XR, Lavida Pro, Tharu, Teramont (and Teramont X), Lamando, ID.4 X, ID.6 X, ID.3, ID. Era 5X, ID. Era 8X, ID. Era 9X, ID. Era 5S, Viloran; Audi: A5L Sportback, A7L, Q5 e-tron, Q6; AUDI: E5, E7X

==== SAIC-Volkswagen and Škoda ====
In April 2005, Škoda officially landed at Shanghai Volkswagen, ushering Shanghai Volkswagen into the dual brand era. In September 2006, Shanghai Volkswagen Škoda – the first Chinese manufactured Škoda - was launched and the Chinese name was announced.

Octavia, the first Shanghai Volkswagen Škoda model, hit the market on 6 June 2007. Following Octavia's success, Shanghai Volkswagen launched Fabia in 2008 and Superb in 2009.

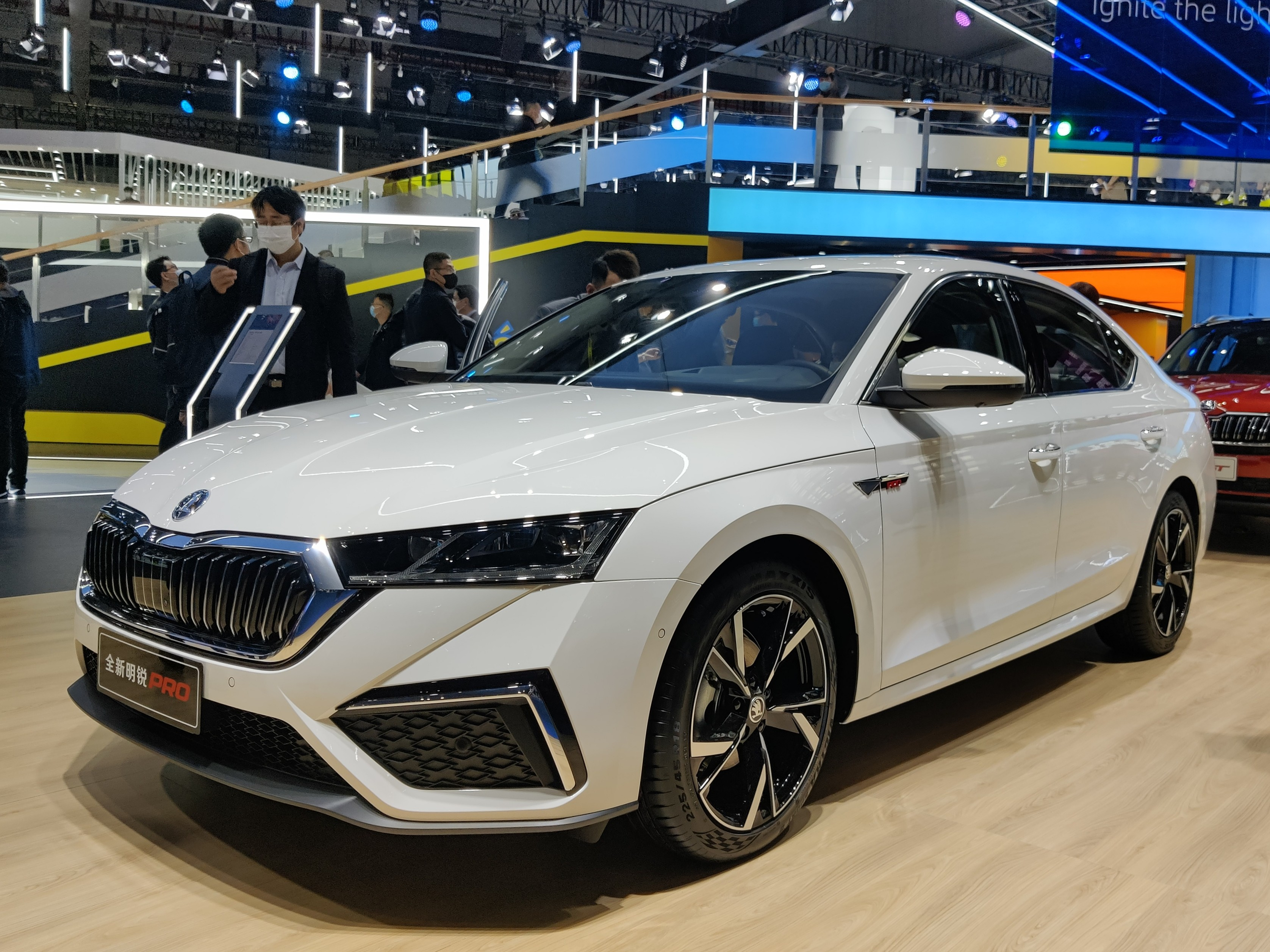
Škoda Octavia

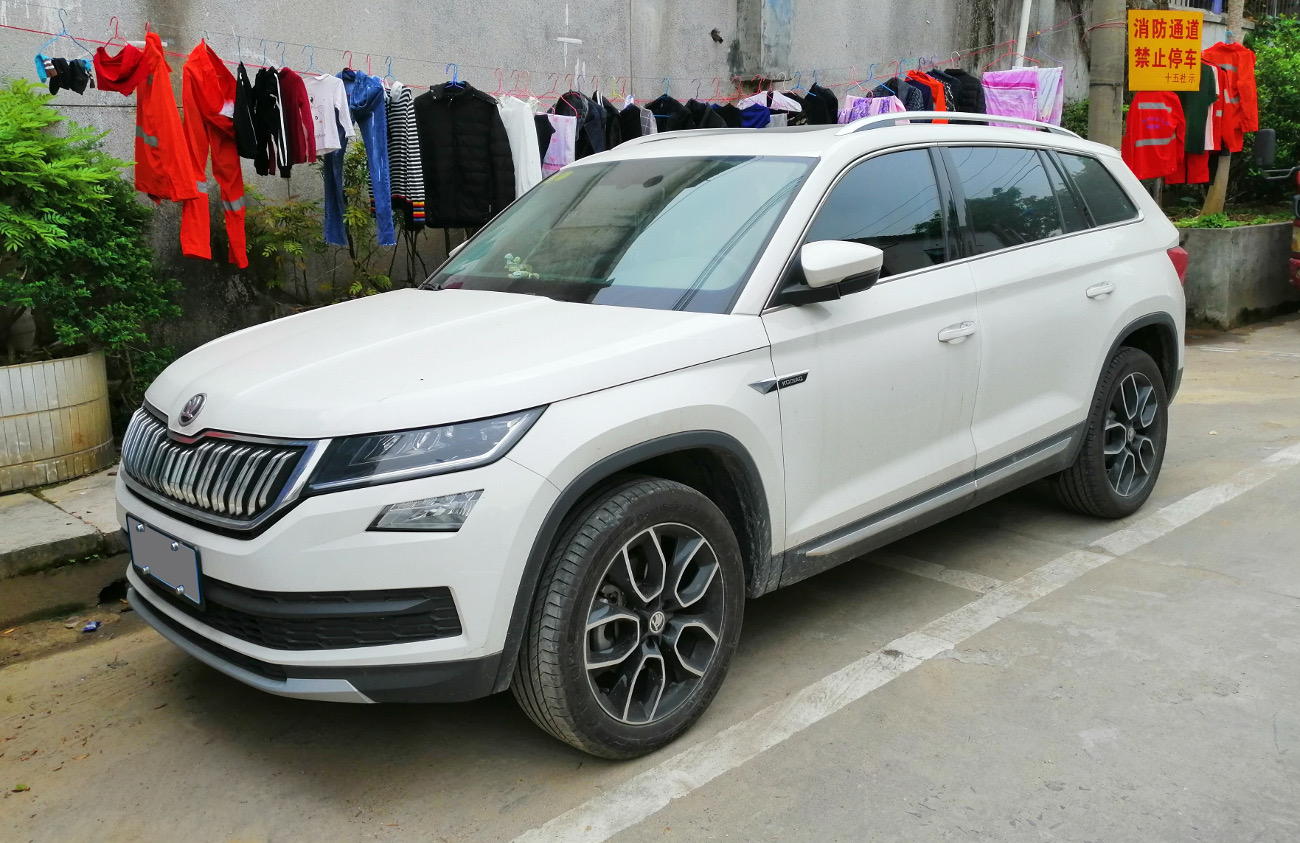
Škoda Kodiaq

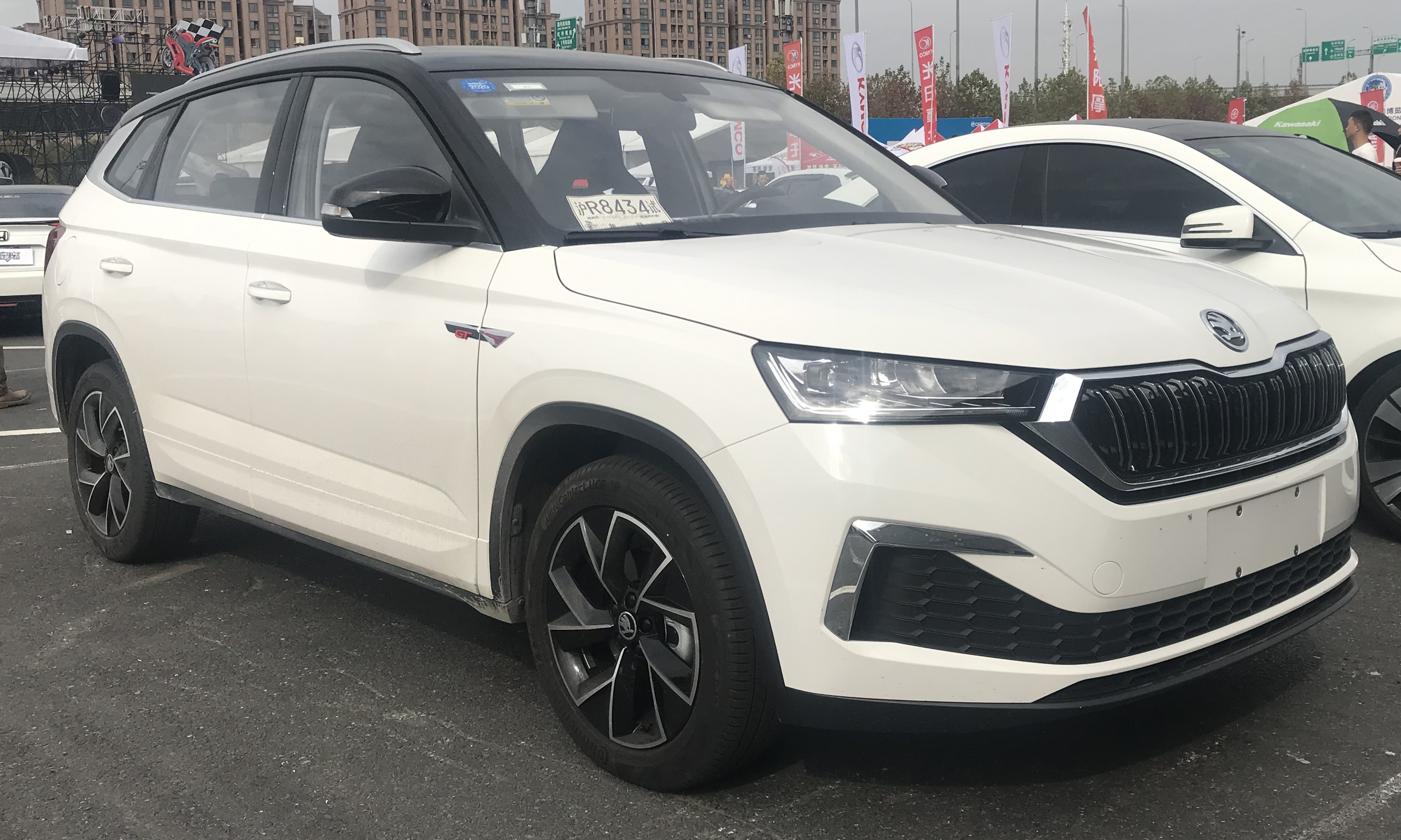
Škoda Kamiq GT

==== SAIC-Volkswagen and Audi ====
In 2021, SAIC-Volkswagen launched the production of Audi branded cars, with the first being the Audi A7L. It has plans to sell 250,000 to 300,000 units per year by 2025 after the launch of other models. According to SAIC Audi marketing division, Audi cars that SAIC-Volkswagen intend to launch are all superior to the existing Audi models of FAW-Volkswagen.

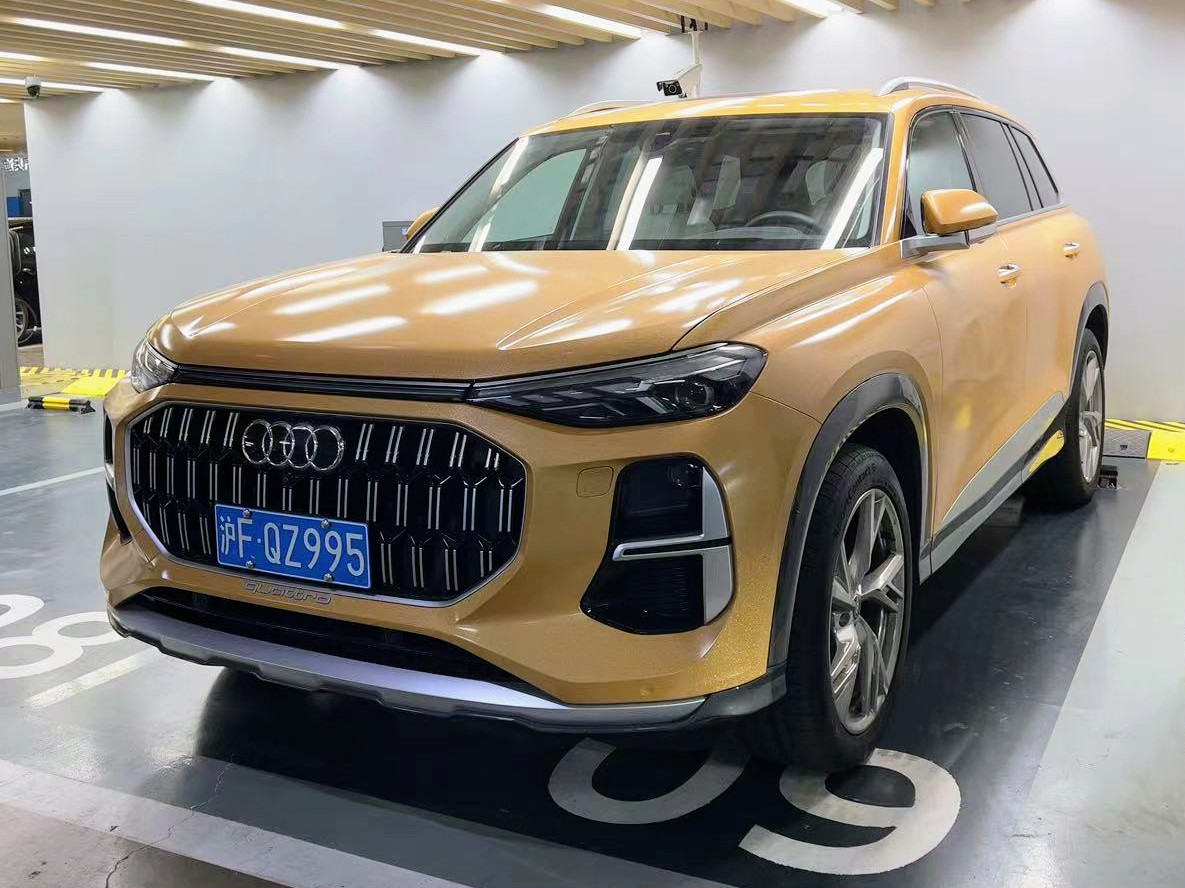
Audi Q6

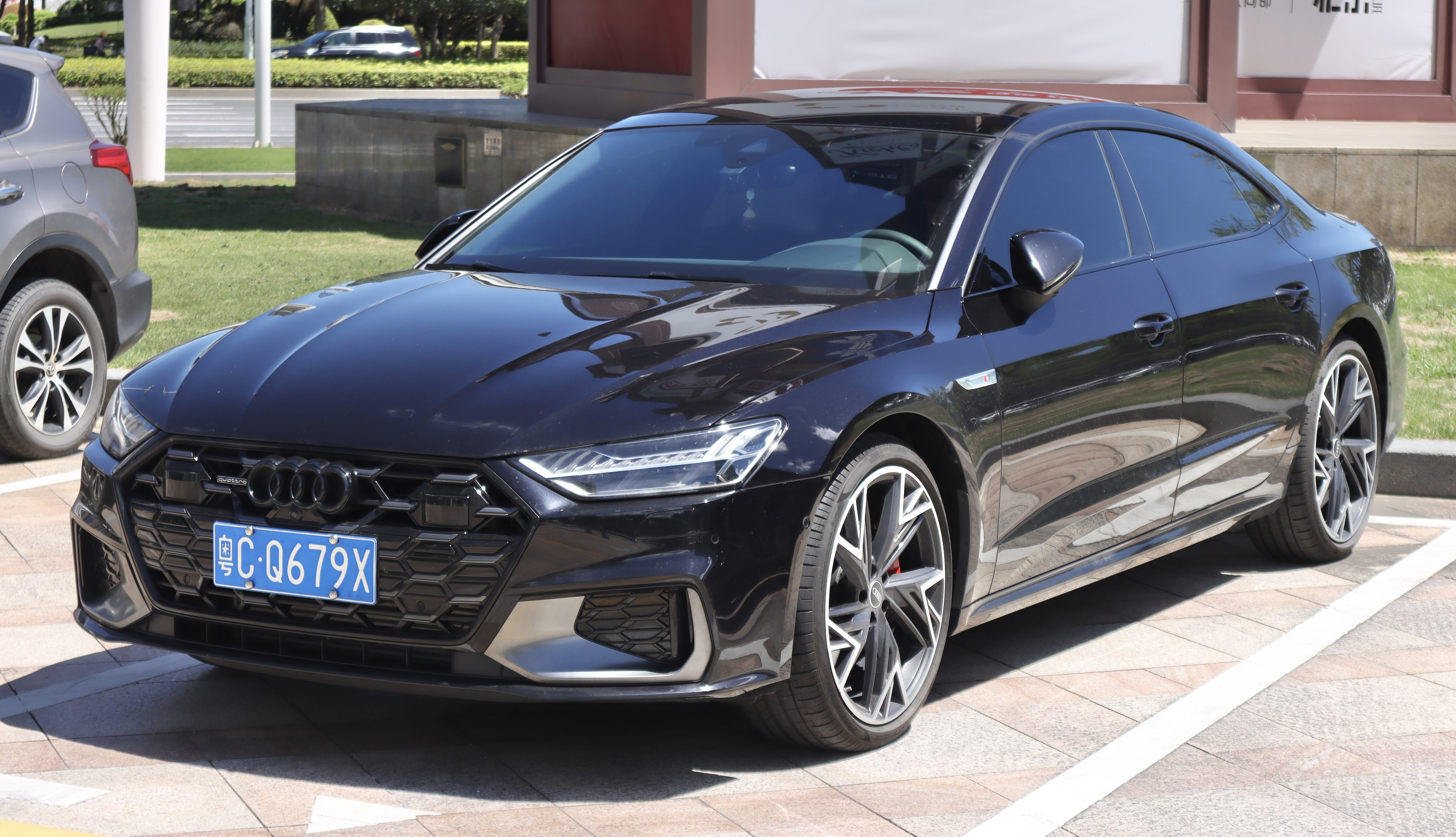
Audi A7L

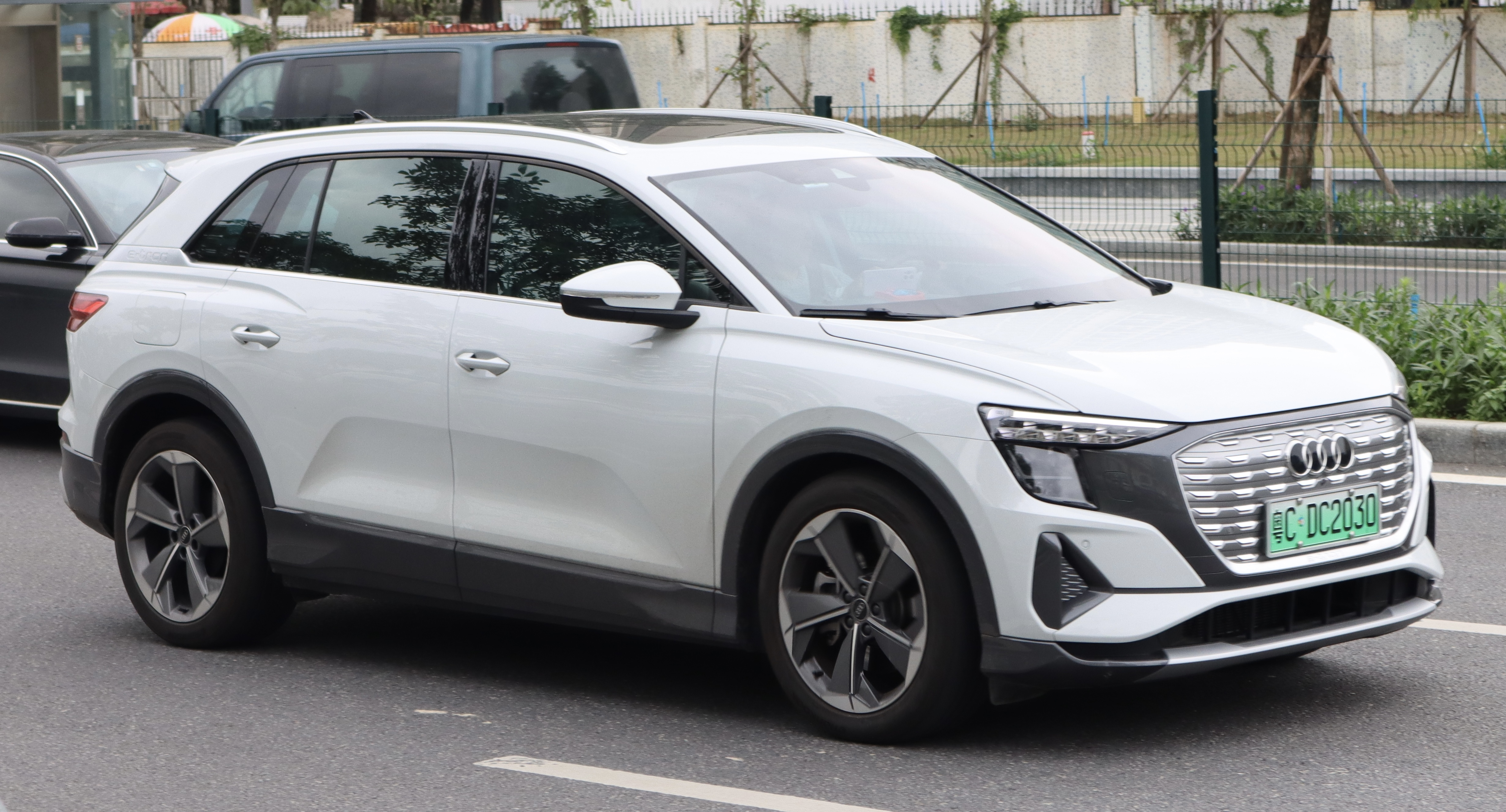
Audi Q5 e-tron

=== FAW-Volkswagen ===
Established in February 1991, FAW-Volkswagen Automotive Company (FAW-VW) is a joint venture by FAW Group's First Automotive Works, Volkswagen AG, Audi AG and Volkswagen (China) Investment Co., Ltd headquartered in Changchun, Jilin. It was the first modern car industrial base constructed with an economy of scale in China. With its development over the years, FAW-Volkswagen is producing thousands of vehicles on a daily basis.

FAW-Volkswagen manufactures ten vehicle models under the brands Volkswagen Passenger Cars and Audi. Its product lineup includes the Volkswagen Jetta, New Bora, Golf, Sagitar, Magotan, Volkswagen CC, Audi A6L, Audi A4L, Audi Q3 and Audi Q5.

FAW-Volkswagen Automotive Company
founding year	1990 (production start: 1991)
headquarters	Changchun/Jilin province
equity holders	Volkswagen AG (20%), VW (China) Invest (10%), Audi AG (10%), FAW (60%)
employees	27,000 (31.12.2010)
current products	Volkswagen: Tayron (and Tayron X), Tayron L, T-Roc, Bora (MQB and PQ35), Golf, Sagitar (Jetta A7 LWB), Sagitar L, Sagitar S, Magotan (Passat B9), CC, ID. Aura T6, Talagon, Tavendor; Audi: A6L, A5L, Q2L, Q5L, Q3, Q4 e-tron, A3; Jetta: M6, VA3, VA7, VS5, VS7, VS8

==== FAW-Volkswagen and Audi ====
Audi AG, with more than 20 years of development experience in China, was the first global premium car brand to realize domestic production in China.

Agreements on the manufacturing of the Audi 100 under license were signed on 13 August 1988, with this date marking the conclusion of negotiations lasting one year. The joint venture agreement included both the technology transfer for the production and planning of the Audi 100, and the setting up of after sales support. Expertise was in addition transferred by providing training for some 500 Chinese workers at Audi in Germany. Furthermore, around 30 Audi employees were posted to Changchun to provide production support.

In November 1993, the then-Board Chairman of FAW and Volkswagen AG, signed a letter of intent on the integration of Audi production and a V6 engine plant into the FAW-Volkswagen joint venture, which had been established at the end of 1991. As a result of the signing of the agreements in December 1995, Audi acquired a 10 percent stake in the joint venture by the name of FAW-Volkswagen Automotive Company Ltd. Volkswagen AG controls 30 percent, with FAW continuing to hold a 60 percent stake.

The first Audi product built by the joint venture, a modified Audi 100 with V6 engine bearing the model designation Audi 200, went into production in May 1996. The Audi 200 remained in production until summer 1999 (facelift of the Audi 100) with 2.6 and 2.4 litre V6 engines and the 4-cylinder, 1.8 litre turbo power unit. The content manufactured locally at the Changchun plant was 60 percent.

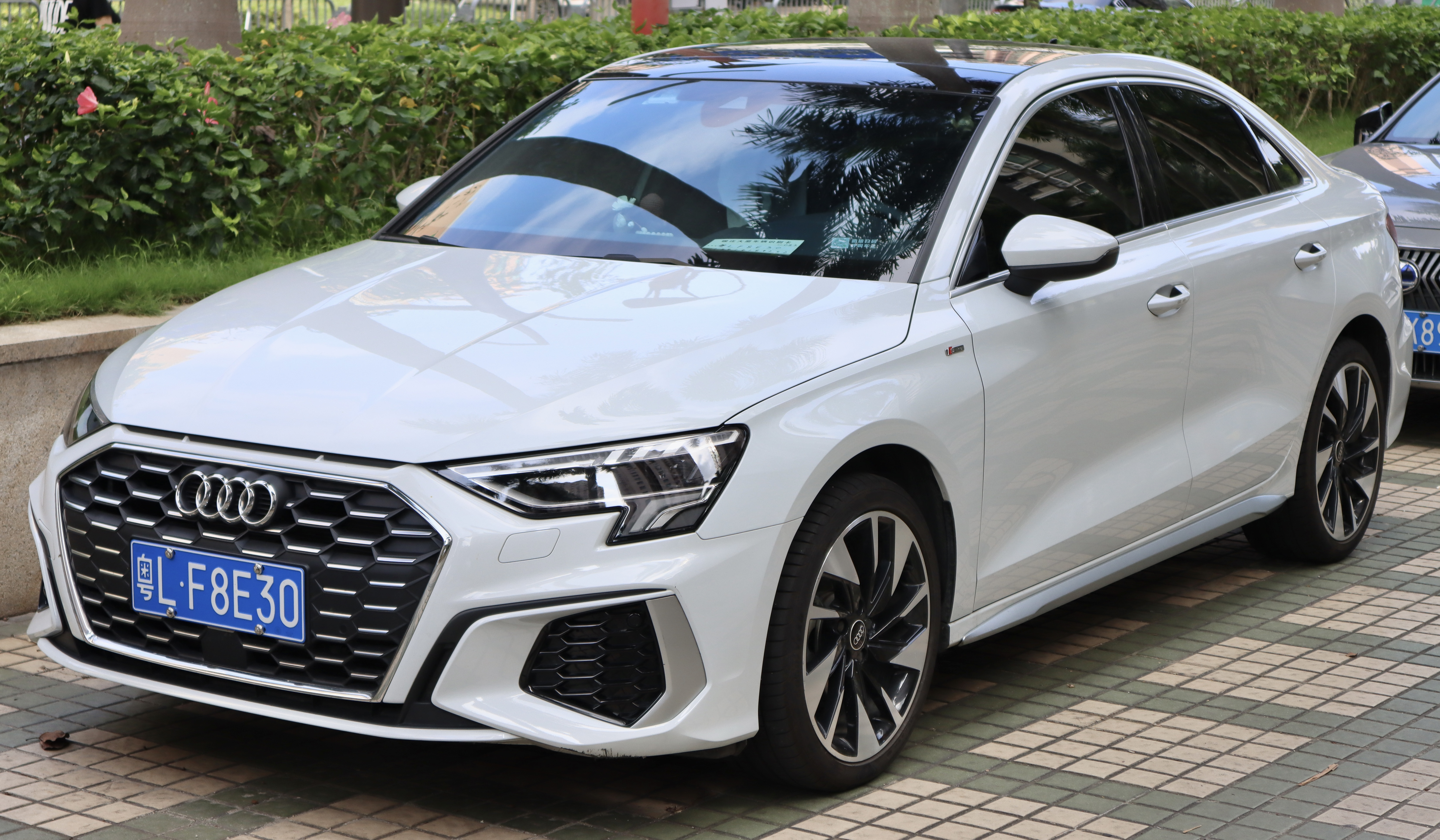
Audi A3L

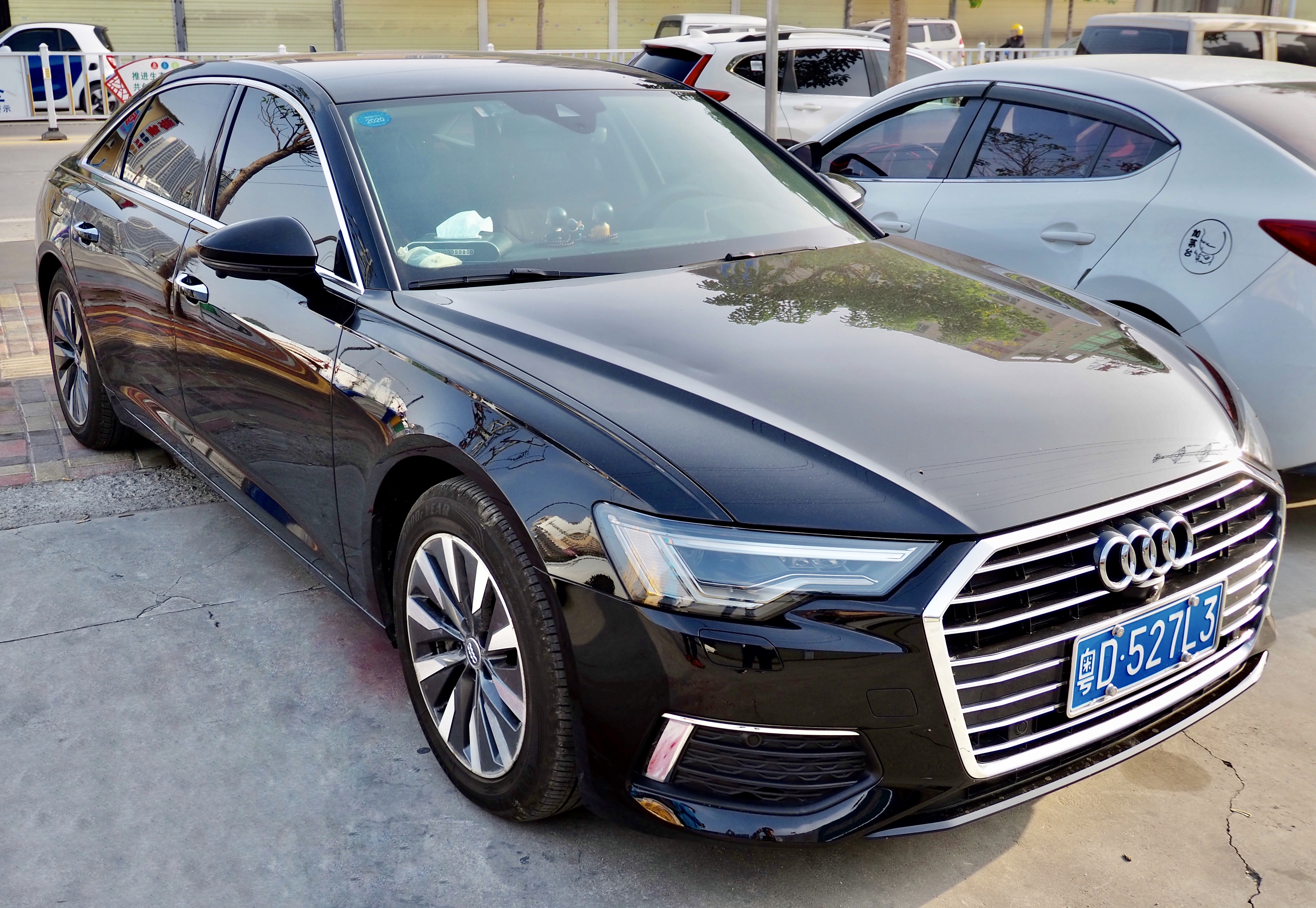
Audi A6L

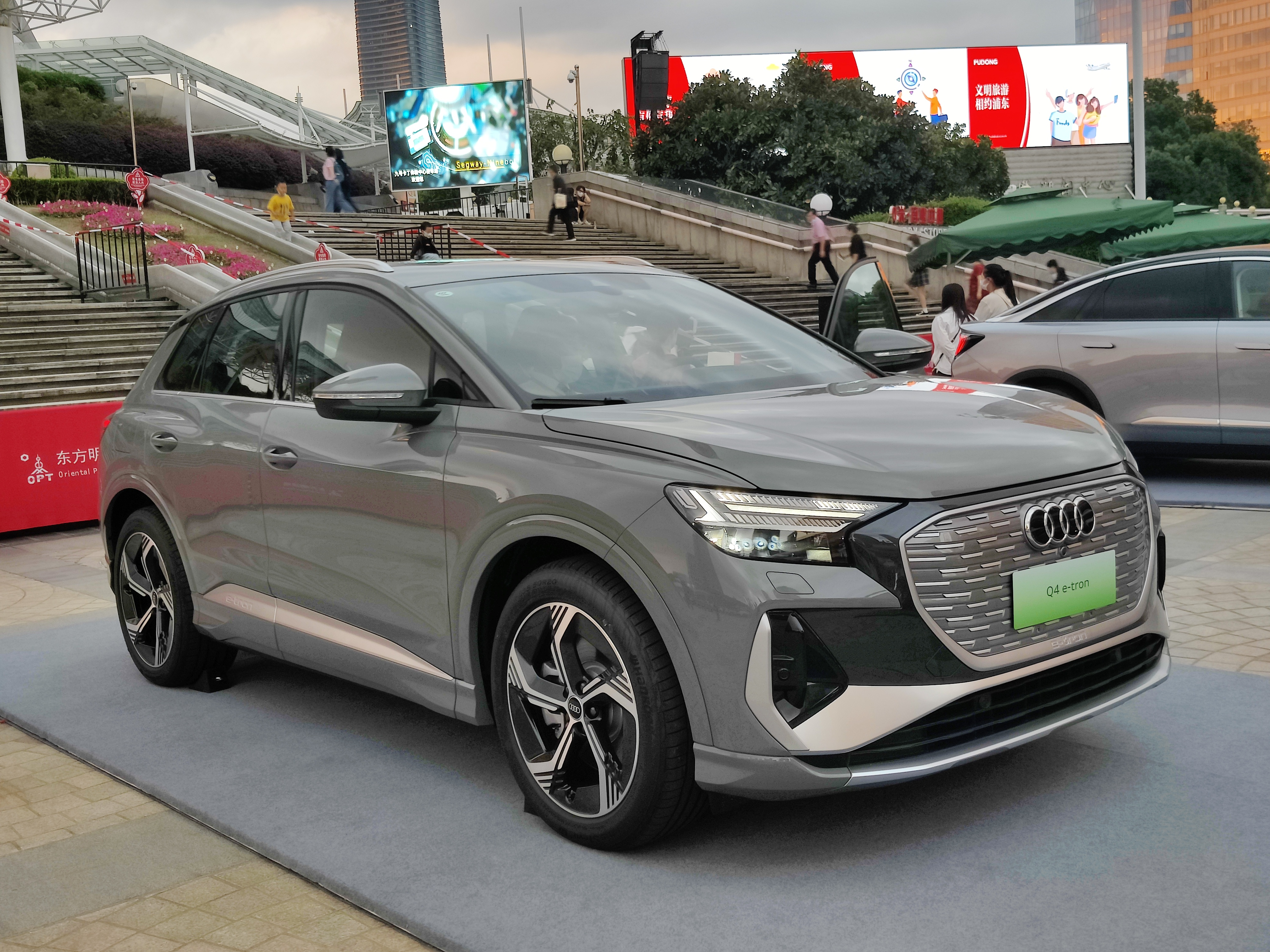
Audi Q4 e-tron

=== Volkswagen Anhui ===
Volkswagen Anhui (formerly JAC-Volkswagen) is a joint venture formed in 2017 between JAC Motors and Volkswagen headquartered in Hefei, Anhui, initially to produce electric vehicles under the SEAT brand, and later the Sehol brand.

It was renamed to Volkswagen Anhui after Volkswagen took a majority stake (75%) in the company in 2020 along with a 50% stake in government-owned JAG (parent of JAC) in a one billion euro deal. The company will focus on electric vehicles, with an eMobility R&D hub that will serve the entire Volkswagen Group in China.

Volkswagen is building a new factory for Volkswagen MEB platform electric vehicles with a capacity of 350,000 a year under the company, alongside a battery systems factory under wholly owned VW Anhui Components Company.

In May 2023, Volkswagen announced a further CNY23.1 billion (US$3.3 billion) investment into Volkswagen Anhui, consisting of CNY14.1 billion on a research and development center and nearly CNY9.1 billion on the first phase of a production base in Hefei.

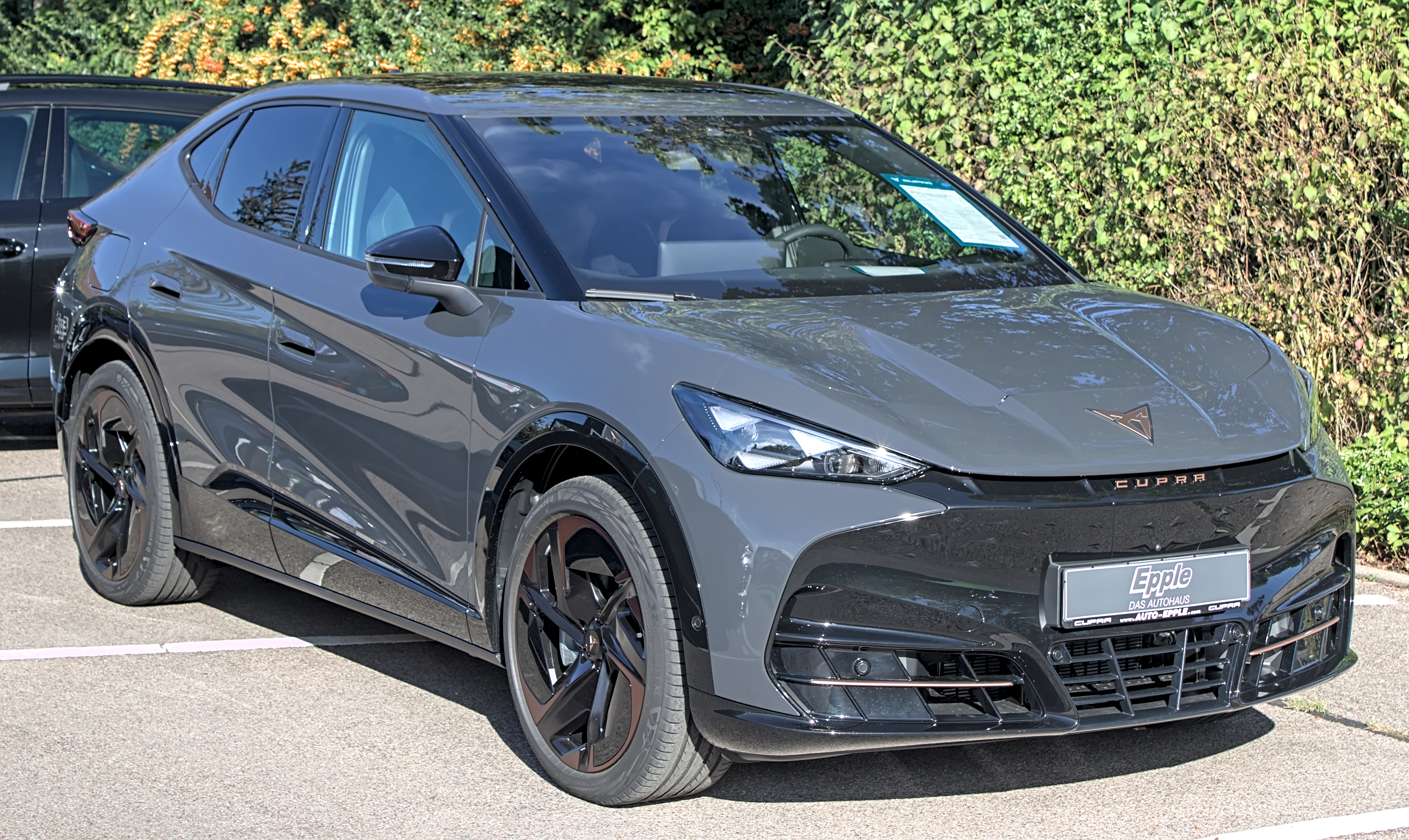
Cupra Tavascan

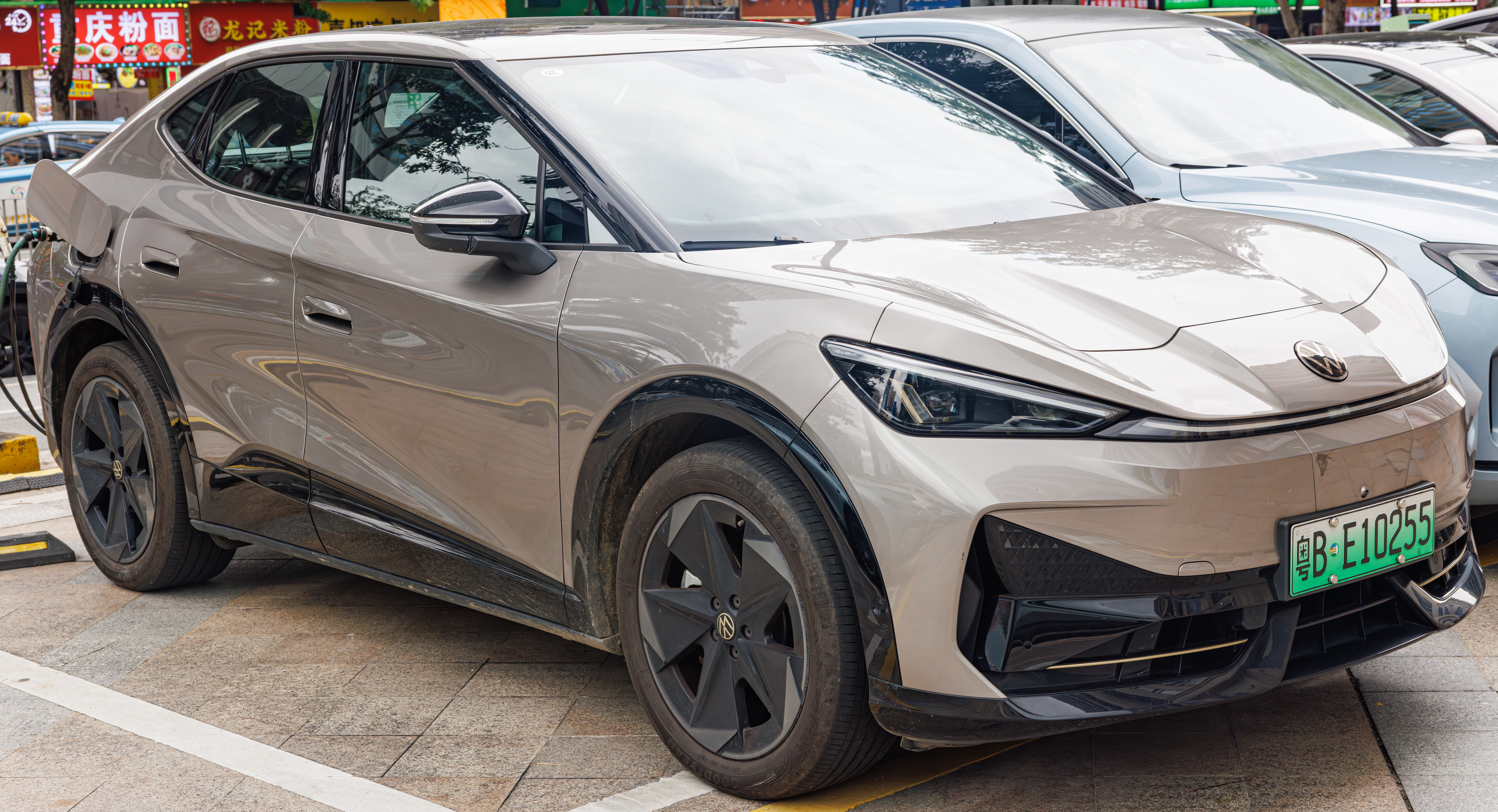
Volkswagen ID. Unyx 06

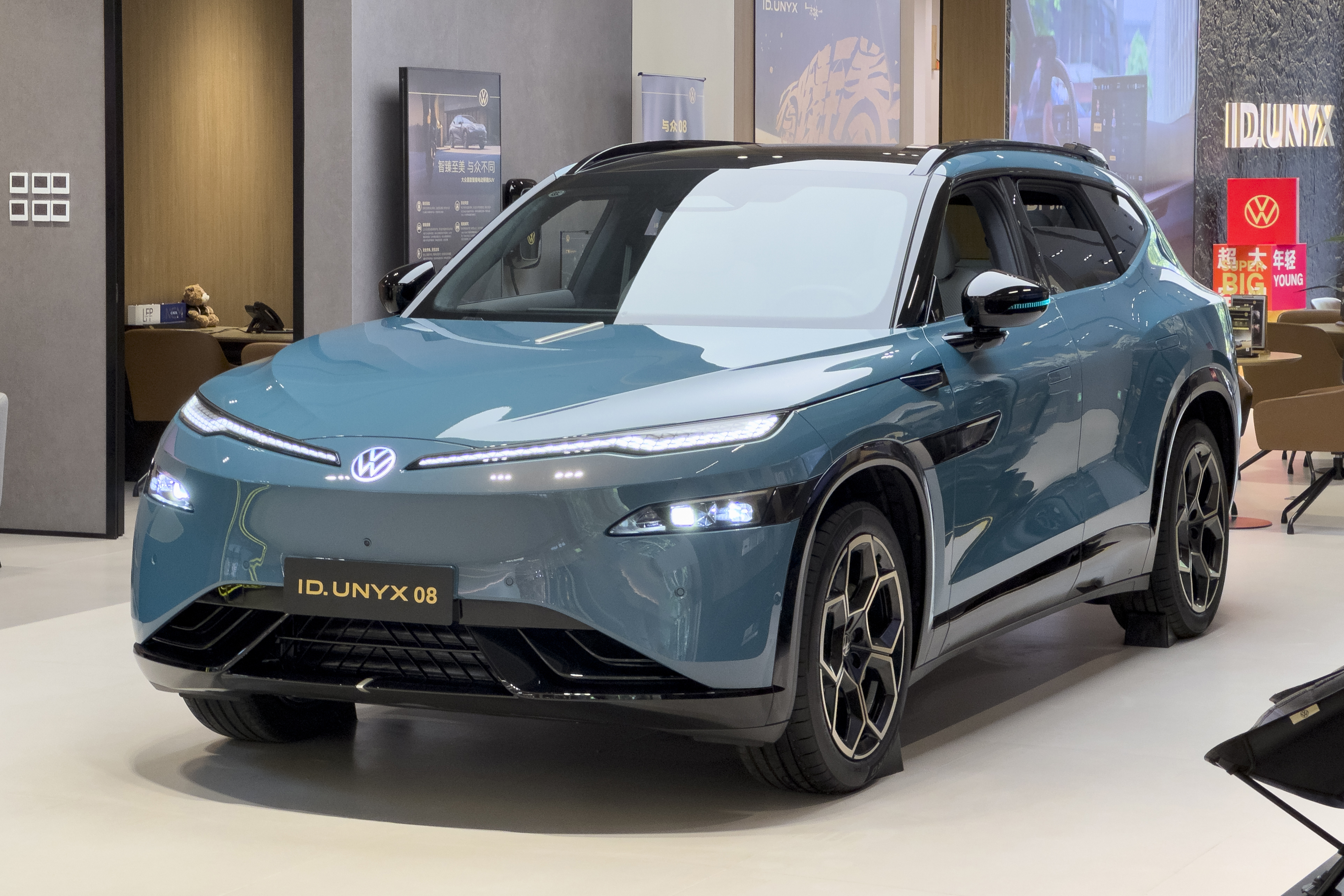
Volkswagen ID. Unyx 08

=== Audi FAW NEV ===
In March 2021, a joint venture (JV) was established between Audi and First Automotive Works, creating Audi FAW New Energy Vehicle Co., Ltd., headquartered in Changchun, Jilin. Equity holdings are split - Audi AG (55%), Volkswagen (China) Invest (5%), FAW (40%). With a planned annual production capacity of 150,000 units, Audi FAW NEV will focus on mid-size and full-size electric Audi models using the PPE platform that was jointly developed by Audi and Porsche.

	Audi FAW New Energy Vehicle Co., Ltd.
founding year	2021
headquarters	Changchun/Jilin province
equity holders	Audi AG (55%), VW (China) Invest (5%), FAW (40%)
products	Audi: A6L e-tron, Q6L e-tron, Q6L Sportback e-tron

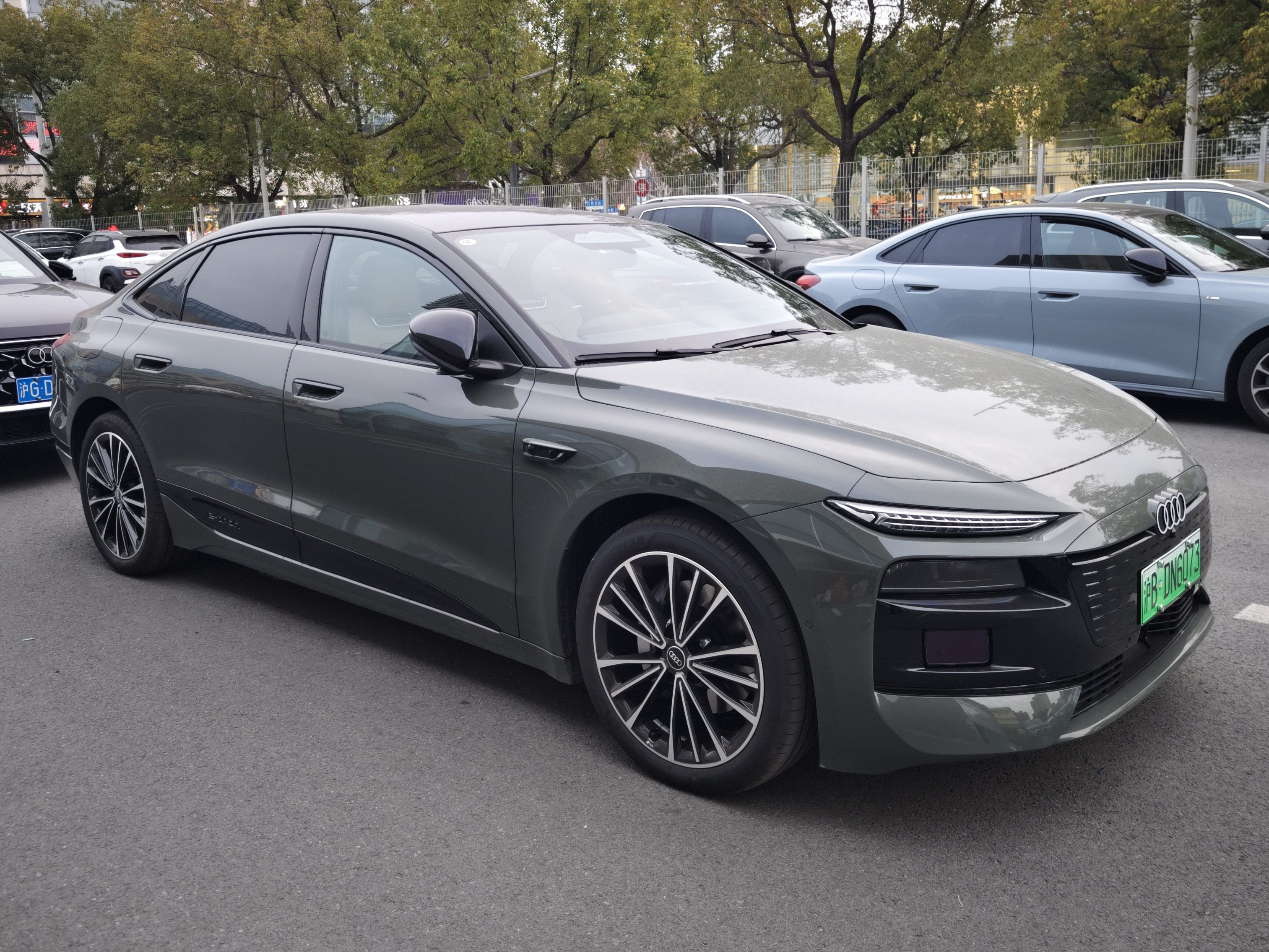
Audi A6L e-tron

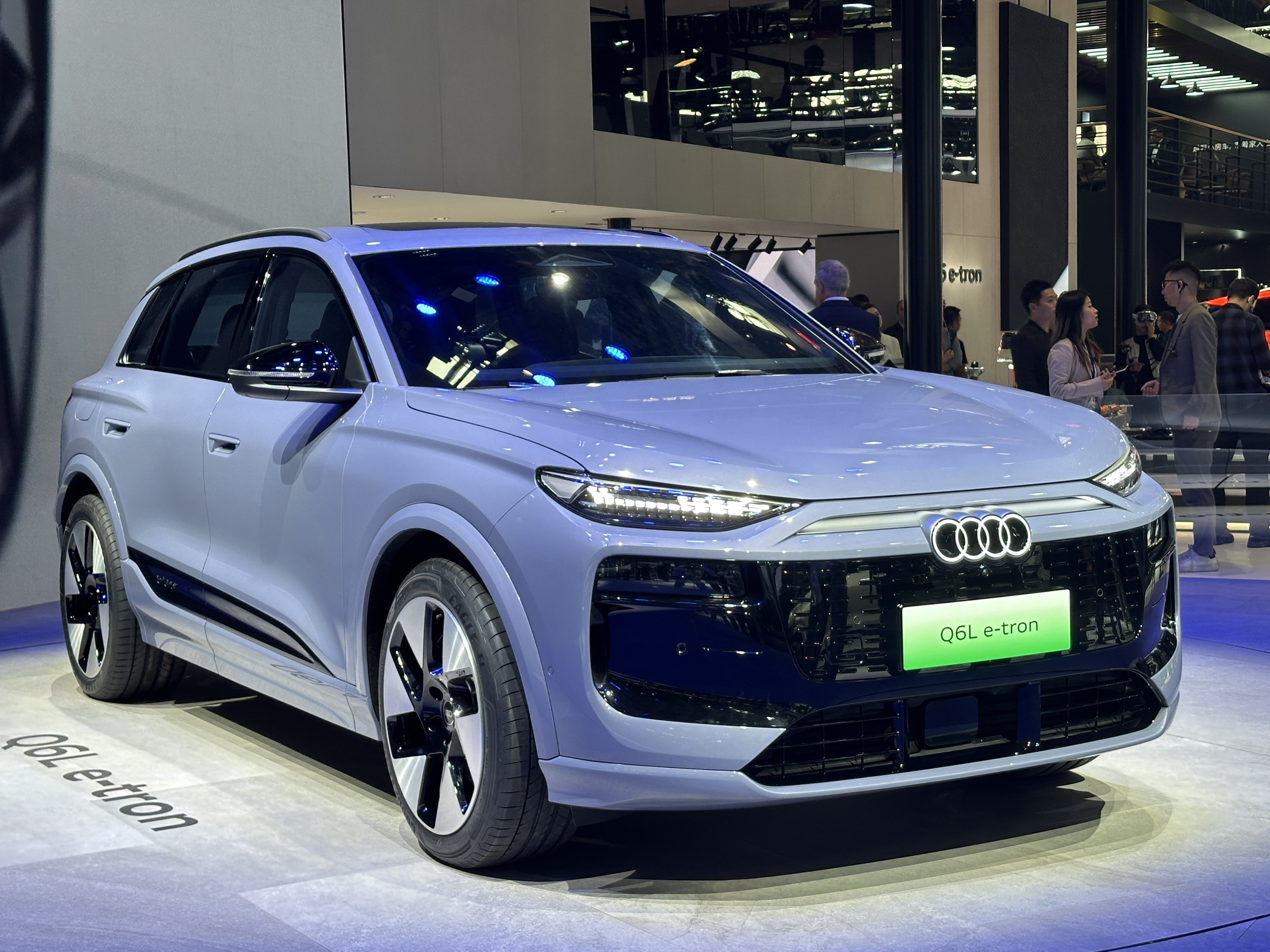
Audi Q6L e-tron

=== 100%TechCo ===
In April 2023, Volkswagen announced the investment of one billion euros ($1.1 billion) in a new China center called 100%TechCo for the development, innovation and procurement of fully connected electric cars. It will be based in Hefei, near Volkswagen Anhui and be driven by 2,000 staff.

It plans to merge vehicles and components R&D with procurement, shortening the development cycle of new products and technologies by around 30%. It is supposedly already expected to "play a major role" in the development of a future Volkswagen brand model to be launched in 2024.

=== Further VGC entities ===
The following are the subsidiary companies which form Volkswagen Group China:

Company	Ownership	Location
Volkswagen (China) Investment Company Ltd.	VW AG 100%	Beijing
Volkswagen Finance (China) Company Ltd.	VW AG 100%	Beijing
Volkswagen Beijing Center Company Ltd.	VW (China) 70%, Automobile Repair Company Beijing 30%	Beijing
Volkswagen FAW Platform Company Ltd. (Powertrain)	VW 60%, FAW 40%	Changchun
FAW-Volkswagen Sales Company Ltd.	FAW-VW 99%, FAW 1%	Changchun
Volkswagen FAW Engine (Dalian) Company Ltd.	VW (China) 60%, FAW 40%	Dalian
Volkswagen Automatic Transmission (Dalian) Company Ltd.	VW (China) 100%	Dalian
Volkswagen Transmission (Shanghai) Company Ltd.	VW (China) 60%, FAW 20%, SAIC 20%	Shanghai
Shanghai Volkswagen Powertrain Company Ltd.	VW (China) 60%, SAIC 40%	Shanghai
SAIC-Volkswagen Sales Company Ltd.	SAIC 50%, VW (China) 30%, SVW 20%	Shanghai
Volkswagen Import Company Ltd.	VW (China) 100%	Tianjin
SITECH Dongchang Automotive Seating Technology Ltd.	Sitech GmbH 60%, Dongchang 20%, Etern 20%	Dongchang
Volkswagen Hong Kong Ltd.	VW (China) 100%	Hong Kong

== See also ==
- Volkswagen Group
- List of Volkswagen Group factories
- SAIC Volkswagen
- FAW-Volkswagen
- Volkswagen Anhui
