= Audi Q4 e-tron =

Battery electric compact luxury crossover SUV

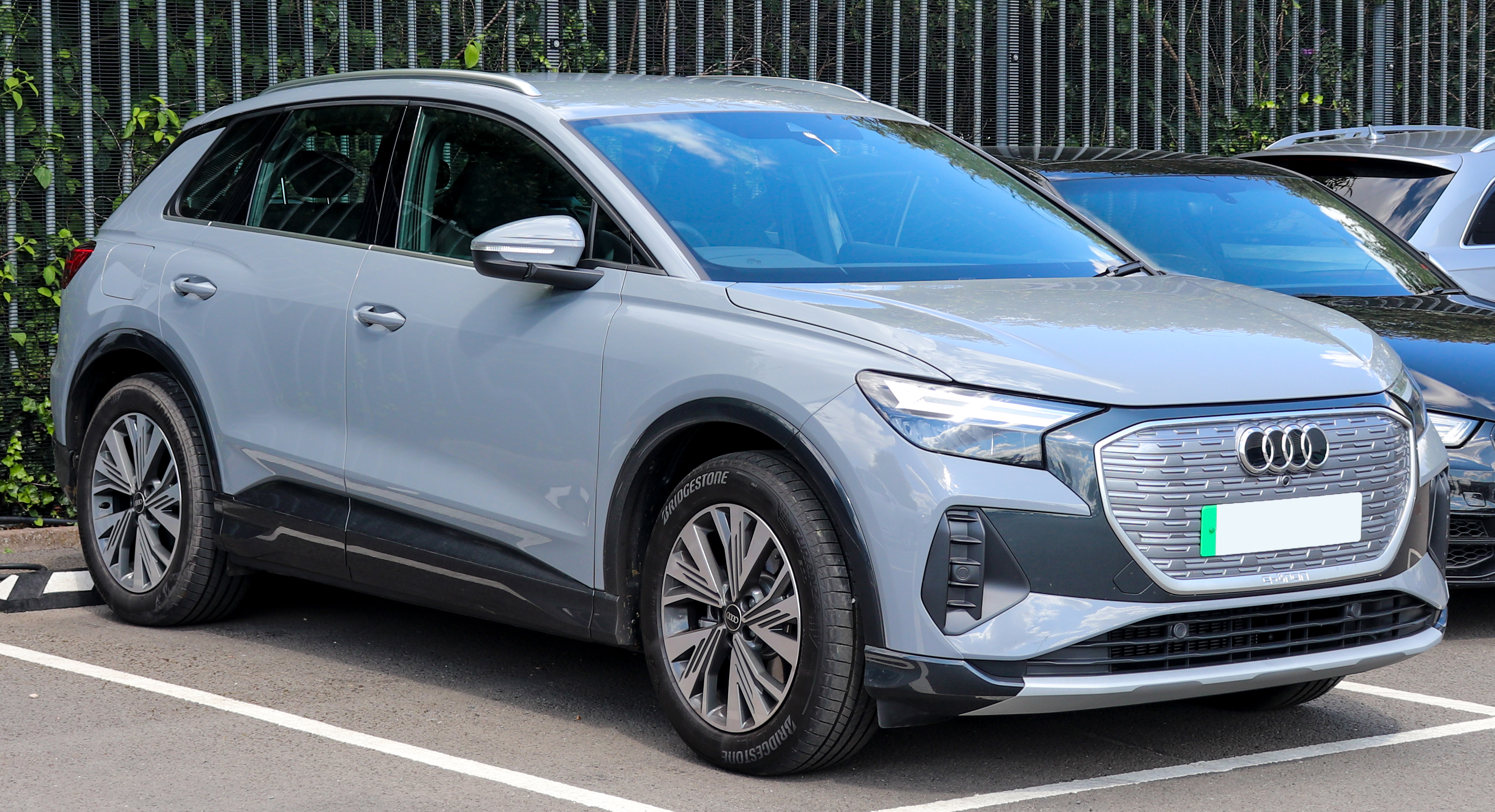

Overview
- Manufacturer: Audi
- Model code: F4
- Production: March 2021 – present
- Model years: 2022–present
- Assembly: Germany: Zwickau (Volkswagen Zwickau-Mosel Plant) China: Foshan (FAW-Volkswagen)
- Designer: Amar Vaya under Marc Lichte (exterior); Chan Park (interior)

Body and chassis
- Class: Compact luxury crossover SUV (D)
- Body style: 5-door SUV; 5-door coupé SUV ("Sportback")
- Layout: Rear-motor, rear-wheel drive Dual-motor, all-wheel drive
- Platform: Volkswagen Group MEB
- Related: Audi Q5 e-tron; Volkswagen ID.4; Škoda Enyaq

Powertrain
- Electric motor: APP 310/APP 550 permanent magnet synchronous motor (Additional asynchronous motor in AWD versions)
- Battery: 52–77 kWh (usable) 55-82kWh (gross) Lithium-Ion
- Electric range: 341–520 km (212–323 mi) (WLTP)
- Plug-in charging: 175 kW (82kWh)

Dimensions
- Wheelbase: 2,764 mm (108.8 in)
- Length: 4,588 mm (180.6 in)
- Width: 1,865 mm (73.4 in)
- Height: 1,632 mm (64.3 in)

The Audi Q4 e-tron is a battery electric compact luxury crossover SUV produced by Audi. It is based on Volkswagen Group's electric MEB platform and is the fourth fully-electric model in the Audi e-tron series after the Audi Q8 e-tron (formerly Audi e-tron), e-tron GT and Q2L e-tron. Production began in March 2021, with the production version being unveiled in April 2021.

The Q4 e-tron is also notable for being the first Audi to be produced in Zwickau since the pre-war era of the company; the town being the original founding location of both the historic Audi company and its predecessor - Horch - before they were merged into Auto Union in 1932.

== Overview ==
The Q4 e-tron was first shown as a near-series concept vehicle at the Geneva Motor Show in 2019. Positioned in what Audi calls the "heart of the market", the compact SUV segment, its length of 4.58 m (180 in) is slightly shorter than that of the Audi Q5, although Audi claims that the Q4 e-tron offers comparable interior space. With 86 cm (34 in), the front overhangs are relatively short, allowing for a wheelbase of 2.76 m (109 in) while maintaining more compact overall dimensions.

Much of the exterior design such as the spoilers in front of the front wheel arches, the rear spoiler or the bars below the headlights was introduced with vehicle aerodynamics in mind. The Q4 e-tron achieves a drag coefficient of 0.26 in the Sportback version, which is worsened to 0.28 for the regular roofline model. Wheel sizes between 19 and 21 inches are offered.

Optional features include an augmented reality head-up display and an 11.6 in (29 cm) infotainment screen, which can be controlled via voice commands.

The boot (trunk) holds 520 L of space, which is extended to 1,490 L when folding down the second row seats (40:20:40 split) whereas the Sportback versions obtain 535/1,460 L.

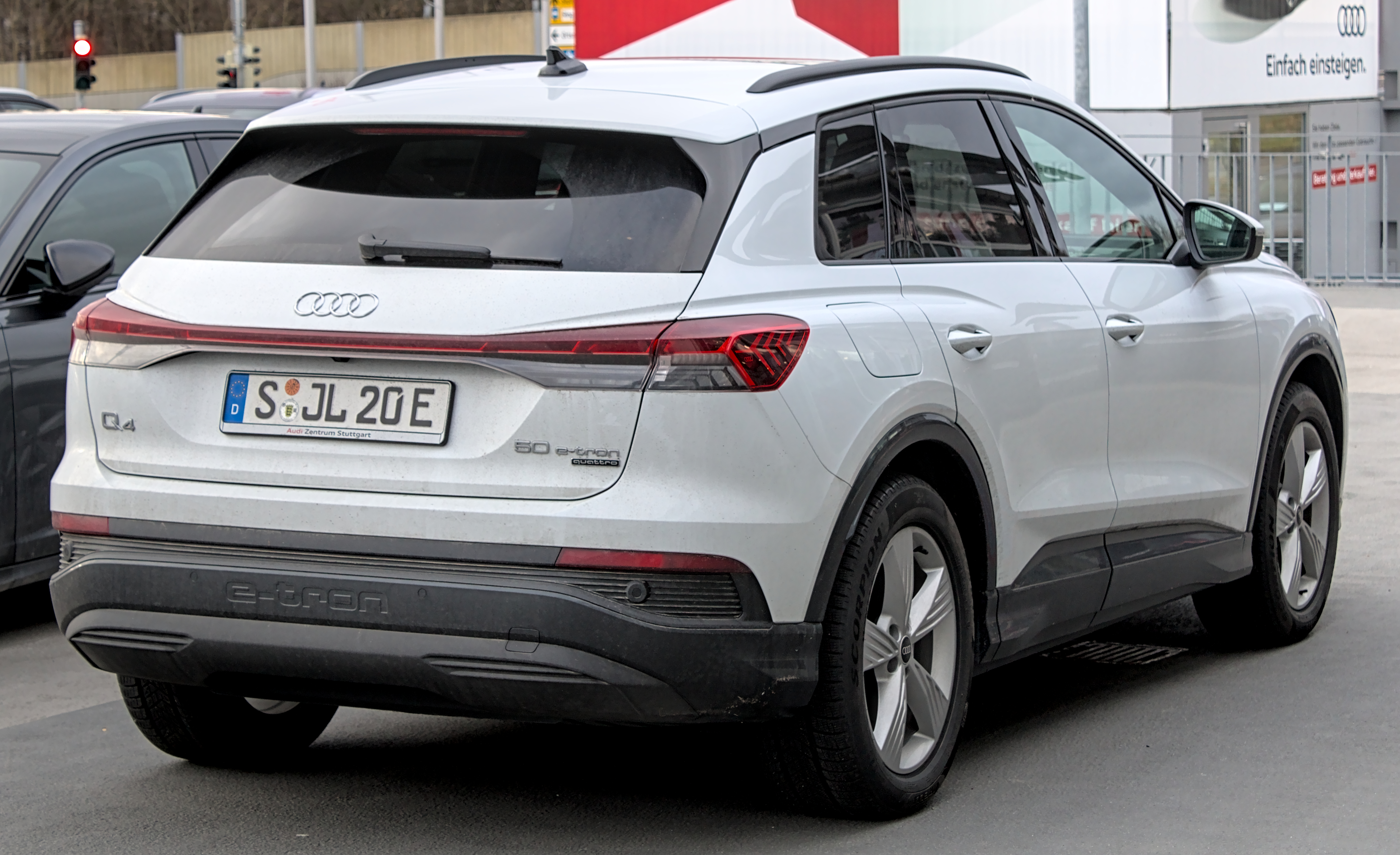
Rear view

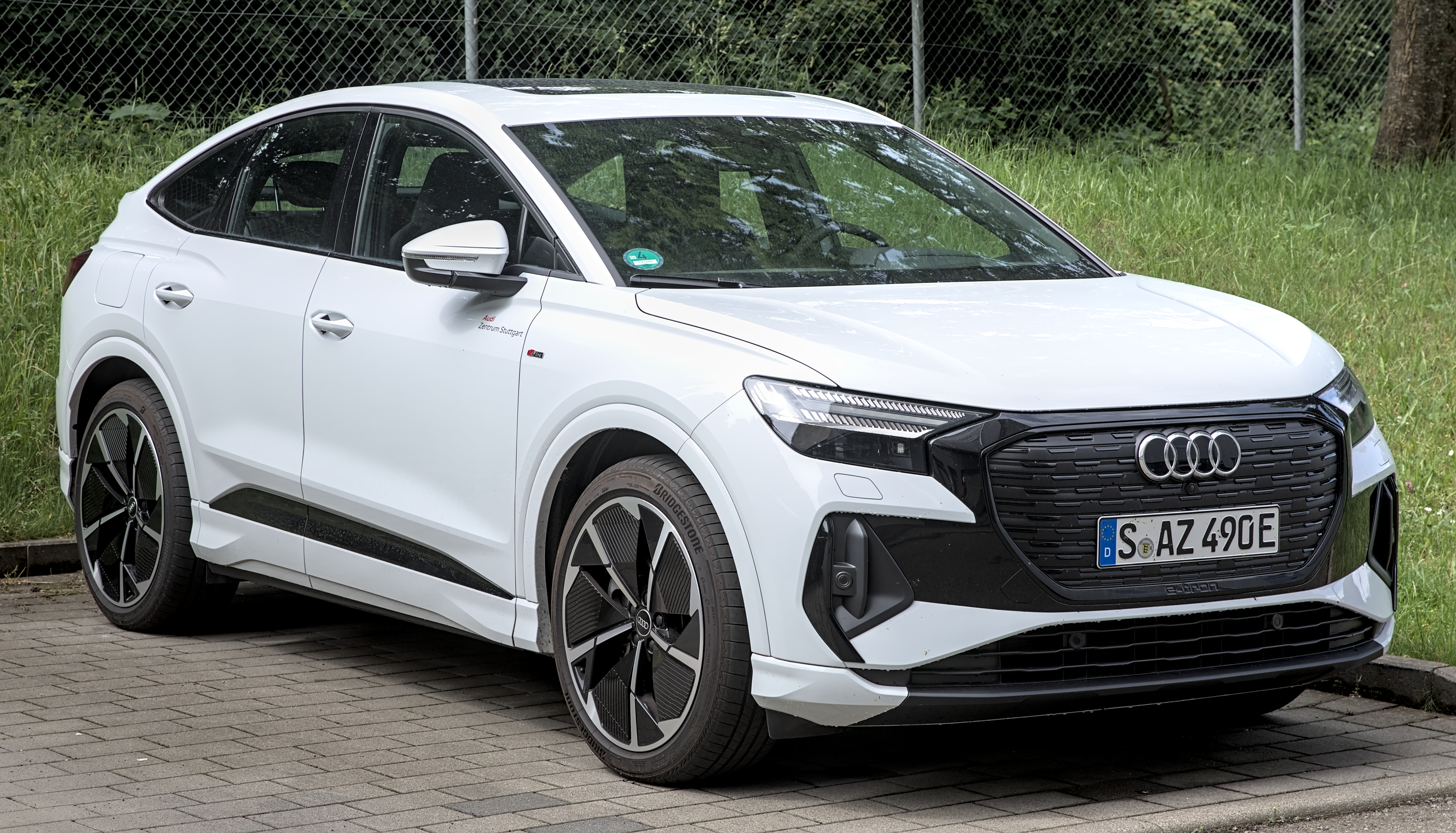
Front view (Sportback)

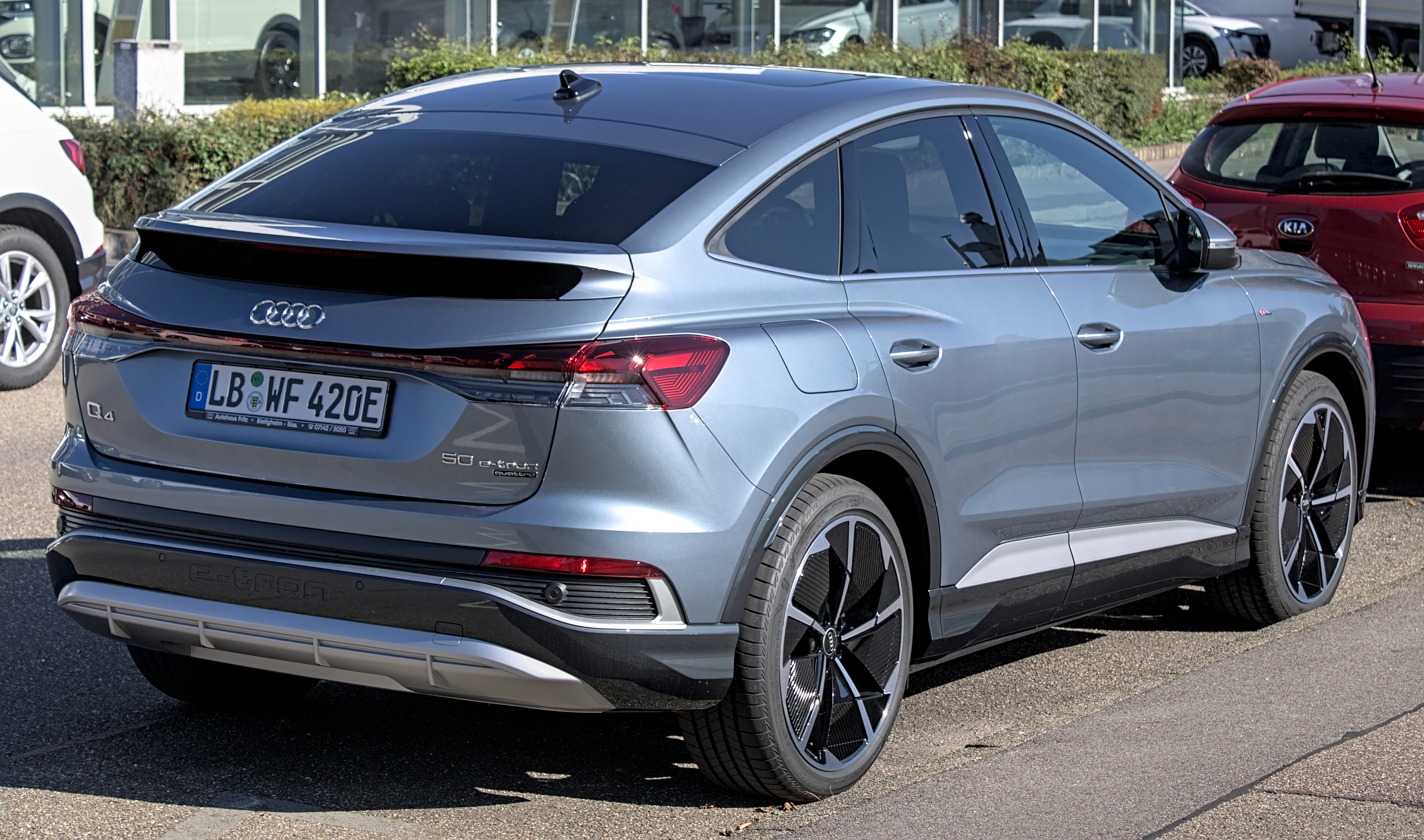
Rear view (Sportback)

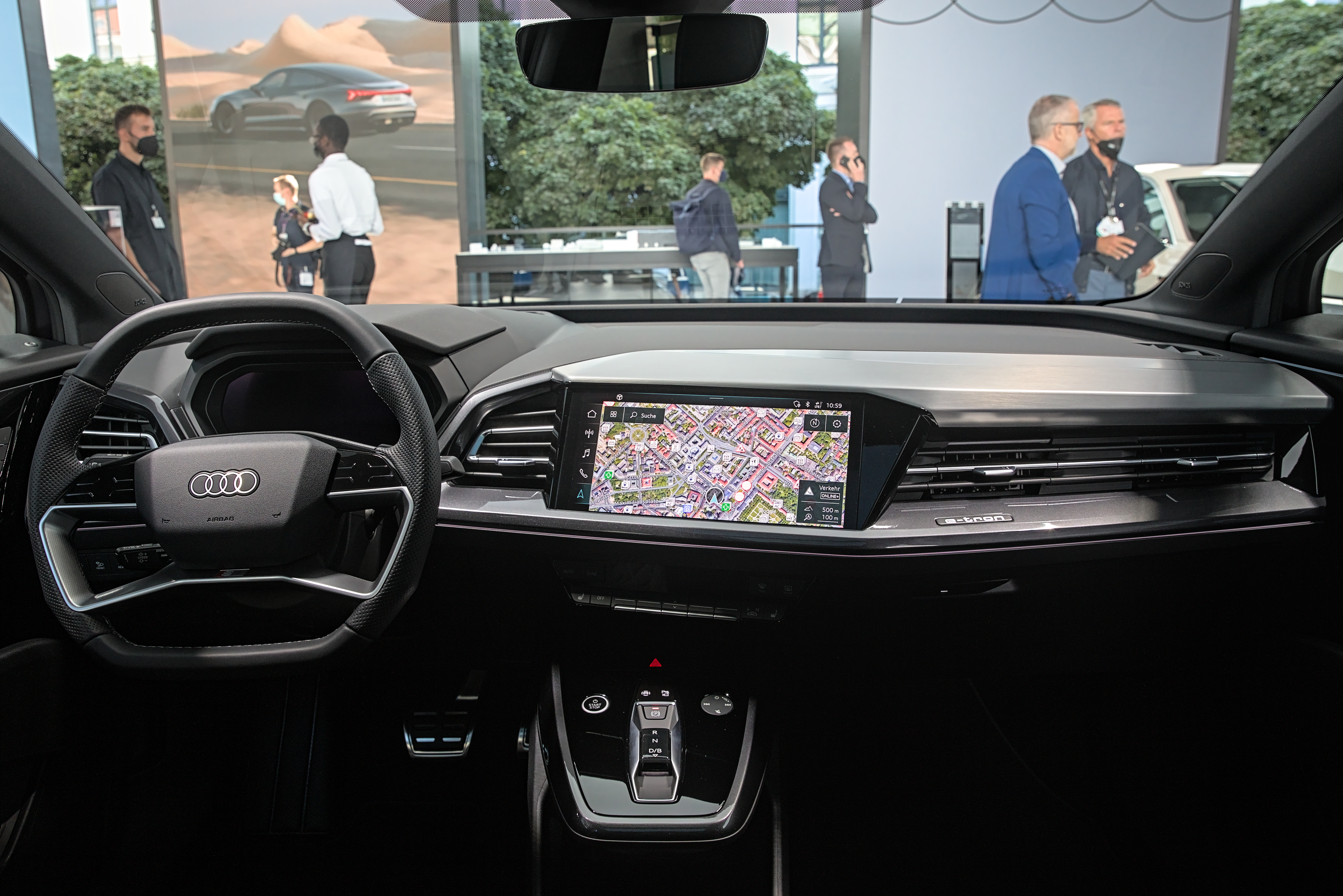
Interior

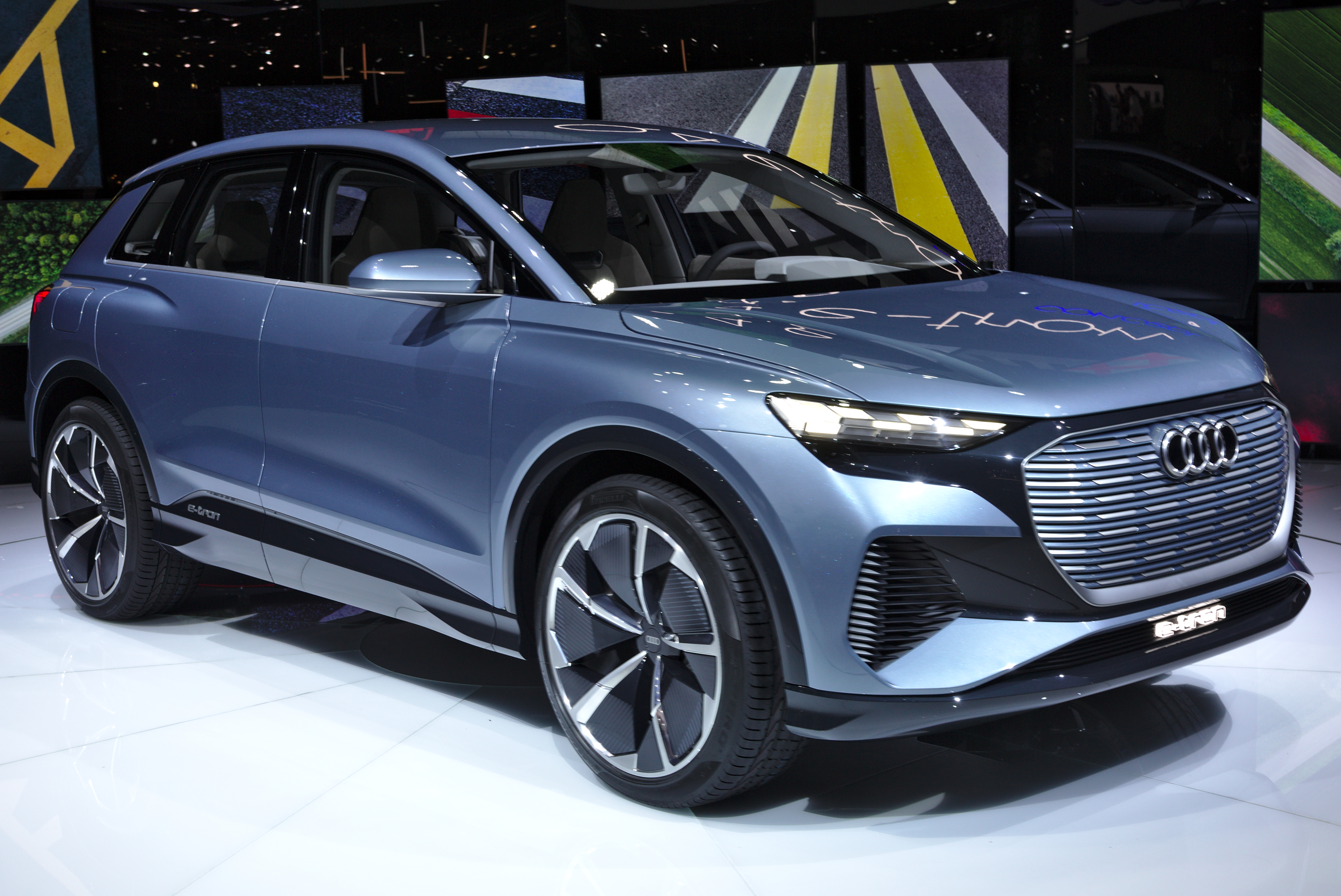
Audi Q4 e-tron concept

=== Facelift ===
On April 27, 2026, a facelift of the Audi Q4 e-tron was presented, making similar changes to both the SUV and Sportback variants. Changes for the exterior are minor, including new customizable headlights, a restyled grille in the body color, as well as updated OLED taillights. The interior has been redesigned with the "Digital Stage" curved dual display unit seen in other recent Audi models, comprising an 11.9-inch driver display and a 12.9-inch central infotainment display. Furthermore, a 12-inch passenger display is available as an option.

In terms of specifications, the battery options and powertrains remain the same, though improvements in efficiency have increased the electric range to 368 mi (592 km) in the rear wheel drive Sportback model. The charging speed has also been increased from 175 kW to 185 kW.

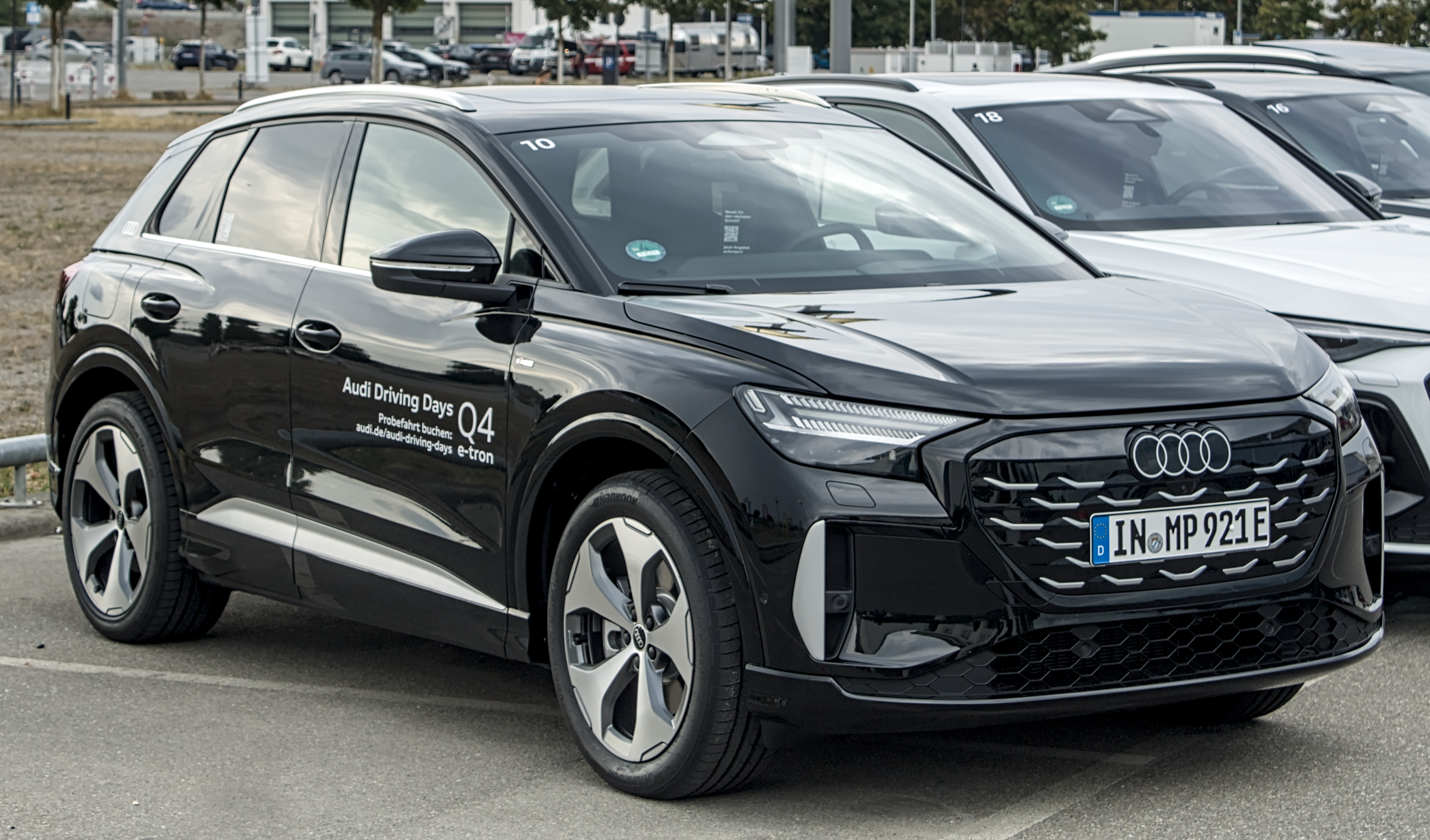
Front view

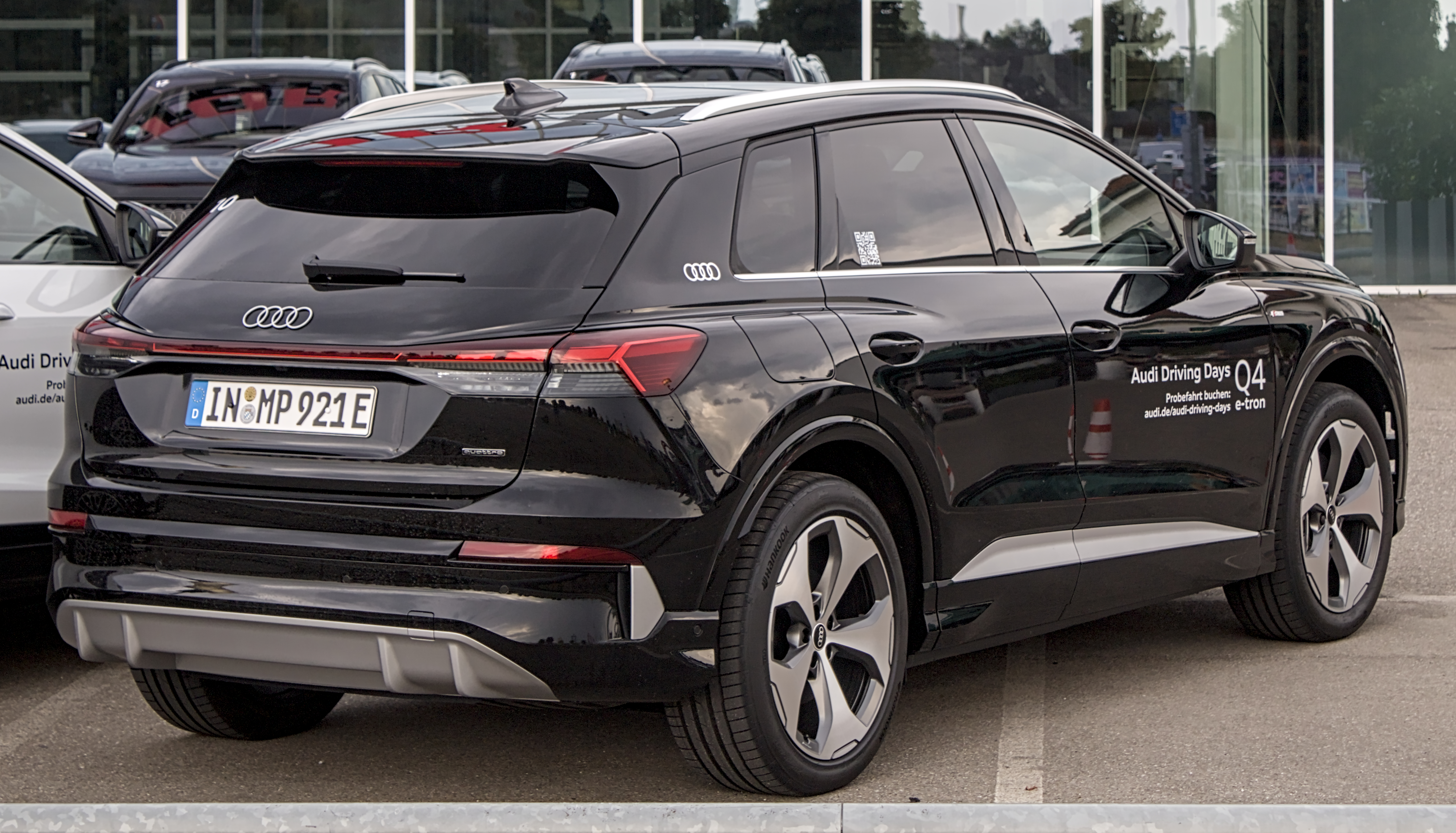
Rear view

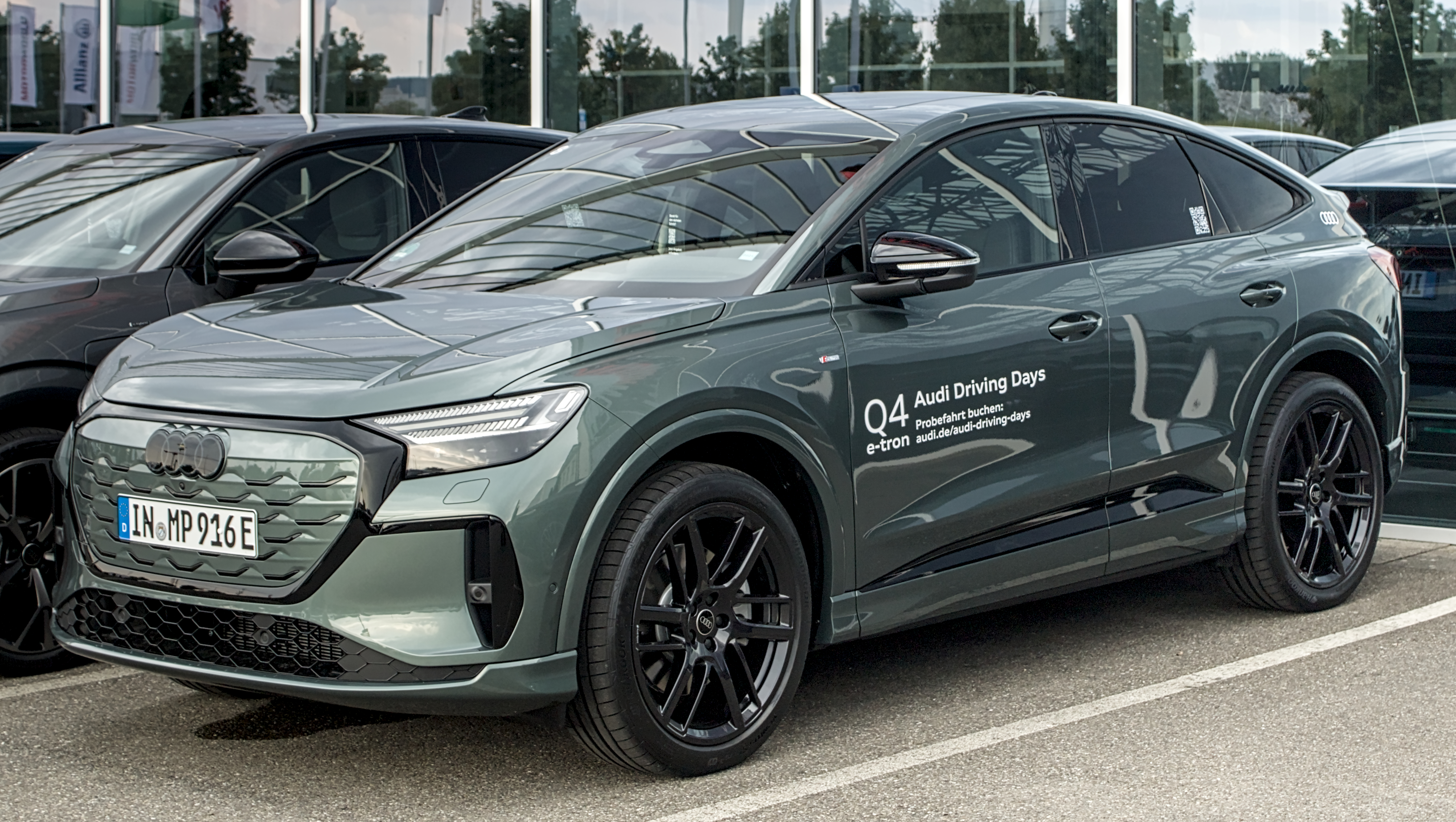
Front view (Sportback)

== Markets ==
=== Europe ===
The market launch in Europe is to begin in June 2021, with prices in Germany starting from €41,900 for the base Q4 35 e-tron. The 40 trim is priced beginning from €47,500 and the Q4 50 e-tron quattro from €52,900. In July 2021, Audi began offering a less powerful all-wheel drive version, the 45 e-tron quattro. Sportback models will arrive in late summer and be priced around €2,000 higher.

Two dedicated "Edition" models are available at launch in all drive variants for €6,195 more respectively, offering a blue or grey paint as well as additional exterior changes.

=== North America ===
The Q4 e-tron is set to arrive in the US in late 2021 for the 2022 model year, with prices beginning from under $45,000. In the US, the entry model will be the Q4 40 e-tron - as such exclusively models using the larger 77 kWh battery pack will be offered in the American market.

The EPA estimated range for the dual motor Q4 50 to be 241 miles (388 km) with a combined highway/city rating of 95 MPGe.

=== China ===
For the Chinese market, the Q4 e-tron will be assembled at the FAW-Volkswagen plant in Foshan. The Q4 e-tron Sportback had started production at the Foshan factory in November 2023.

== Specifications ==
=== Powertrain ===
Rear wheel drive (RWD) models make use of a water-cooled brushless permanently excited synchronous motor positioned along the rear axle, producing up to 150 kW (201 hp) of power and 310 N⋅m (229 lb⋅ft) of torque and rotates at a speed of up to 16,000 rpm. The motor is coupled to a 1-speed transmission with a fixed gear ratio of 13:1 and typically operates with "substantially greater than 90 percent" efficiency.

The motor, transmission, and power electronics (DC/AC converter) together form a compact drive unit that weighs around 90 kg (200 lb).

For the all-wheel drive quattro model, a further asynchronous motor is positioned at the front axle, providing an additional up to 75 kW (101 hp) of power at a speed of 14,000 rpm when required. In most situations, the front motor is not activated in order to increase overall efficiency. Its 1-speed gear is fixed at a ratio of 10:1 while the rear motor in AWD models operates at a ratio of 11.5:1.

During braking, the rear-wheel drive models can recuperate energy up to forces of 0.15 g and up to 0.3 g in the all-wheel drive models, which equates to up to 145 kW (194 hp) of power. When driving, the vehicle by default is set to coast, with recuperation up to 0.15 g being optional.

The motors rotor and stator are produced at the Volkswagen Group Components plant in Salzgitter and are assembled in Kassel, where the 1-speed transmission is built as well. For the Chinese market, the electric drive components are produced in Tianjin.

=== Battery ===
The battery consists of a liquid-cooled Lithium-Ion battery pack which houses either 10 or 12 modules containing the individual battery cells in an aluminium casing. The smaller battery holds an energy content of 55/52 kWh, while the larger pack comes in at 82/77 kWh and weights of 350 kg (772 lb) and 500 kg (1,102 lb), respectively.

Whereas the battery system is assembled at Volkswagen Group plants, the Nickel-Manganese-Cobalt (NMC) battery cells are obtained from suppliers such as LG Energy Solution and CATL. For the Zwickau plant, battery cells pre-assembled into modules at LGs Wrocław plant are delivered by train to be assembled into batteries in Braunschweig.

If charged at a public DC fast charger at a rate of 125 kW (168 hp) under ideal conditions, Audi claims that the 82/77 kWh battery pack can charge from 5 to 80 percent in 38 minutes.

Audi Q4 e-tron (2021–mid 2024)

Model	Year	Battery Capacity full/usable [kWh]	Drivetrain	Power [kW]	Torque [N⋅m]	0–100 km/h (0–62 mph)	Top Speed [km/h] (governed)	Kerb Weight [kg]	Range (WLTP)	DC Charging [kW]	AC Charging on-board [kW]	Charging duration
Q4 35 e-tron	2021-	55 / 52	RWD	125 kW (168 hp)	310 N⋅m (229 lb⋅ft)	9.0 s	160 km/h (99 mph)	1,890 kg (4,167 lb)	341 km (212 mi)	up to 100	7.2	100%: 450 minutes (AC 1-phase wall box/charging station 7.2 kW); 5-80%: 36 minutes (DC charging station 110.0 kW)
Q4 40 e-tron	2021-	82 / 77	RWD	150 kW (201 hp)	310 N⋅m (229 lb⋅ft)	8.5 s	160 km/h (99 mph)	2,020 kg (4,453 lb)	509 km (316 mi)	125	11	100%: 450 minutes (AC 3-phase wall box/charging station 11.0 kW); 5-80%: 29 minutes (DC charging station 135.0 kW)
Q4 45 e-tron quattro	2021-	82 / 77	AWD	195 kW (261 hp)	425 N⋅m (313 lb⋅ft)	6.9 s	180 km/h (112 mph)	2,210 kg (4,872 lb)	490 km (304 mi)	125	11	100%: 450 minutes (AC 3-phase wall box/charging station 11.0 kW); 5-80%: 29 minutes (DC charging station 135.0 kW)
Q4 50 e-tron quattro	2021-	82 / 77	AWD	220 kW (295 hp)	460 N⋅m (339 lb⋅ft)	6.2 s	180 km/h (112 mph)	2,210 kg (4,872 lb)	485 km (301 mi)	125	11	100%: 450 minutes (AC 3-phase wall box/charging station 11.0 kW); 5-80%: 29 minutes (DC charging station 135.0 kW)

Audi Q4 e-tron (mid 2024–present)

Model	Year	Battery Capacity full/usable [kWh]	Drivetrain	Power [kW]	Torque [N⋅m]	0–100 km/h (0–62 mph)	Top Speed [km/h] (governed)	Kerb Weight [kg]	Range (WLTP)	DC Charging [kW]	AC Charging on-board [kW]	Charging duration
Q4 40 e-tron	2024-	63 / 59	RWD	150 kW (201 hp)*	310 N⋅m (229 lb⋅ft)	8.1 s	160 km/h (99 mph)	2,020 kg (4,453 lb)	388–404 km (241–251 mi)	160	11	100%: 390 minutes (AC 0–100%, 3ph 16A at 230V); 10-80%: 27 minutes (DC)
Q4 45 e-tron	2024-	82 / 77	RWD	210 kW (282 hp)*	545 N⋅m (402 lb⋅ft)	6.6-6.7 s	180 km/h (112 mph)		518–544 km (322–338 mi)	165	11	100%: 510 minutes (AC 0–100%, 3ph 16A at 230V); 10-80%: 29 minutes (DC)
Q4 45 e-tron quattro	2024-	82 / 77	AWD	210 kW (282 hp)*	545 N⋅m (402 lb⋅ft)	6.6 s	180 km/h (112 mph)	2,210 kg (4,872 lb)	492–515 km (306–320 mi)	165	11	100%: 510 minutes (AC 0–100%, 3ph 16A at 230V); 10-80%: 29 minutes (DC)
Q4 e-tron quattro (220 kw)	2024-	82 / 77	AWD	220 kW (295 hp)*	Front: 134 N⋅m (99 lb⋅ft) Rear: 350 N⋅m (258 lb⋅ft)	6.2 s	180 km/h (112 mph)			165	11	100%: 510 minutes (AC 0–100%, 3ph 16A at 230V); 10-80%: 28 minutes (DC)
Q4 55 e-tron quattro	2024-	82 / 77	AWD	250 kW (335 hp)*	Front: 134 N⋅m (99 lb⋅ft) Rear: 545 N⋅m (402 lb⋅ft)	5.4 s	180 km/h (112 mph)		492–515 km (306–320 mi)	185	11	100%: 480 minutes (AC 0–100%, 3ph 16A at 230V); 10-80%: 27 minutes (DC)

*with push-to-pass function enabled

=== Suspension ===
The Q4 e-tron uses a MacPherson front and five-link rear suspension.

=== Towing ===
The RWD models can tow up to 1,000 kg (2,205 lb) and the AWD up to 1,200 kg (2,646 lb) braked with an optional trailer hitch.

=== Safety ===
==== ANCAP ====
ANCAP test results Audi Q4 e-tron (2021, aligned with Euro NCAP)
Test	Points	%
Overall:	5 /5 stars	
Adult occupant:	35.65	93%
Child occupant:	44	89%
Pedestrian:	36.14	66%
Safety assist:	11.49	71%

==== Euro NCAP ====
Euro NCAP test results Audi Q4 e-tron (2021)
Test	Points	%
Overall:	5 /5 stars	
Adult occupant:	35.7	93%
Child occupant:	44	89%
Pedestrian:	36.1	66%
Safety assist:	12.8	80%

Euro NCAP test results Q4 e-tron 45 (LHD) (2025)
Test	Points	%
Overall:	5 /5 stars	
Adult occupant:	36.7	91%
Child occupant:	43	87%
Pedestrian:	49.8	79%
Safety assist:	13.2	73%

== Sales ==
Year	China	US		
Year	China	e-tron	Sportback e-tron	Total
2023	22,371	8,144	2,606	10,750
2024	15,543	8,546	2,810	11,356
2025	5,800	5,264	1,474	6,738

== Reviews and reception ==
In December 2022, Bloomberg named the Audi Q4 e-tron as a great alternative to the Model Y from Tesla for consumers upset with Elon Musk.

== Sustainability ==
According to Audi, it is using exclusively "eco-electricity" during production of the Q4 e-tron for Europe and the US in Zwickau, and demands the same from its suppliers. Audi also claims that what it considers "unavoidable" emissions during production are mitigated through purchasing carbon offsets and, based on this, markets the Q4 e-tron as a "net zero carbon emissions" vehicle when handed to European and American customers.

The "Dinamica" microfibre and "Puls" fabric interior options consist of 45 and 50 percent recycled materials, respectively.
