= Audi Q5 e-tron =

Battery electric mid-size luxury crossover SUV

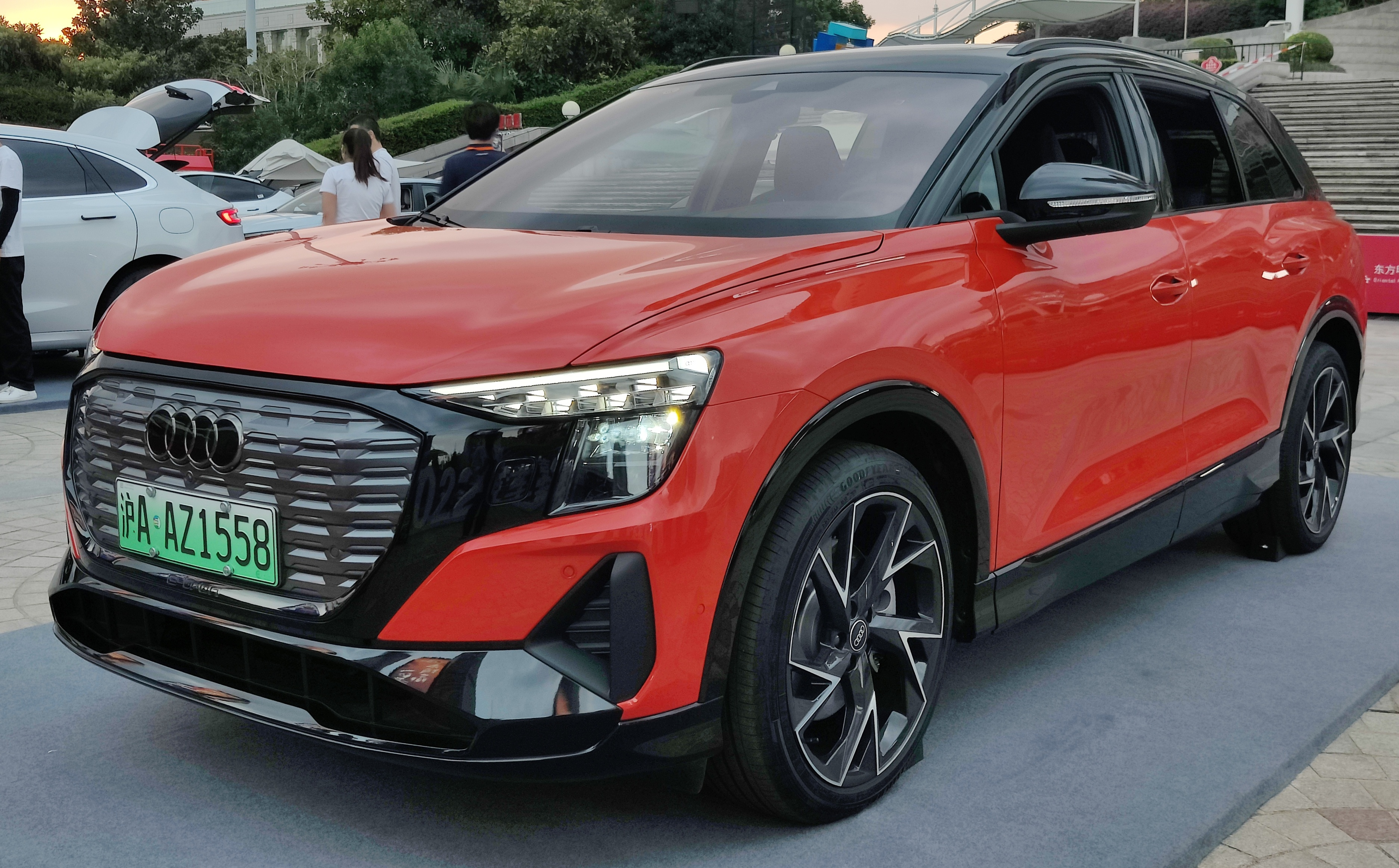

Overview
- Manufacturer: Audi
- Production: 2022–present
- Assembly: China: Anting (SAIC-VW)
- Designer: Khalid Hadad

Body and chassis
- Class: Mid-size luxury crossover SUV
- Body style: 5-door SUV
- Layout: Rear-motor, rear-wheel-drive Dual-motor, all-wheel-drive
- Platform: Volkswagen Group MEB
- Related: Audi Q4 e-tron; Volkswagen ID.6; Volkswagen ID.4; Škoda Enyaq

Powertrain
- Electric motor: APP 310 permanent magnet synchronous; AC induction asynchronous (front, AWD)
- Battery: 83.4 kWh lithium-Ion

Dimensions
- Wheelbase: 2,965 mm (116.7 in)
- Length: 4,876 mm (192.0 in)
- Width: 1,860 mm (73.2 in)
- Height: 1,675 mm (65.9 in)

The Audi Q5 e-tron is a battery electric mid-size luxury crossover SUV with three-row seating produced by Audi through the SAIC-VW joint venture in China. Based on the MEB platform, it is the fifth battery electric model in the Audi e-tron series. Closely related to the Q4 e-tron, the model is regarded as the Audi equivalent of the similarly sized Volkswagen ID.6, and not mechanically related to the Audi Q5 or the Q8 e-tron which use the MLB platform.

== Overview ==
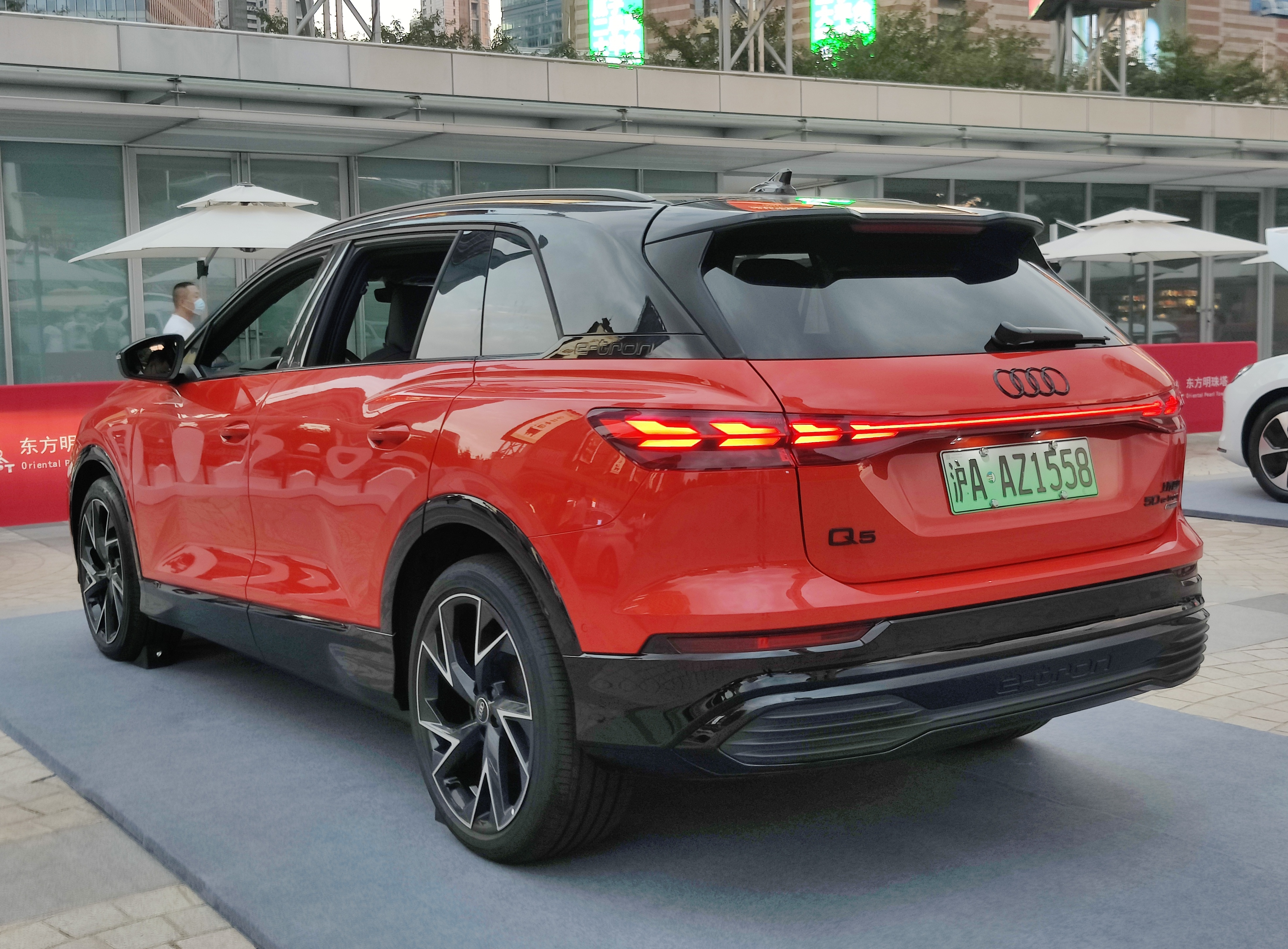
Rear view

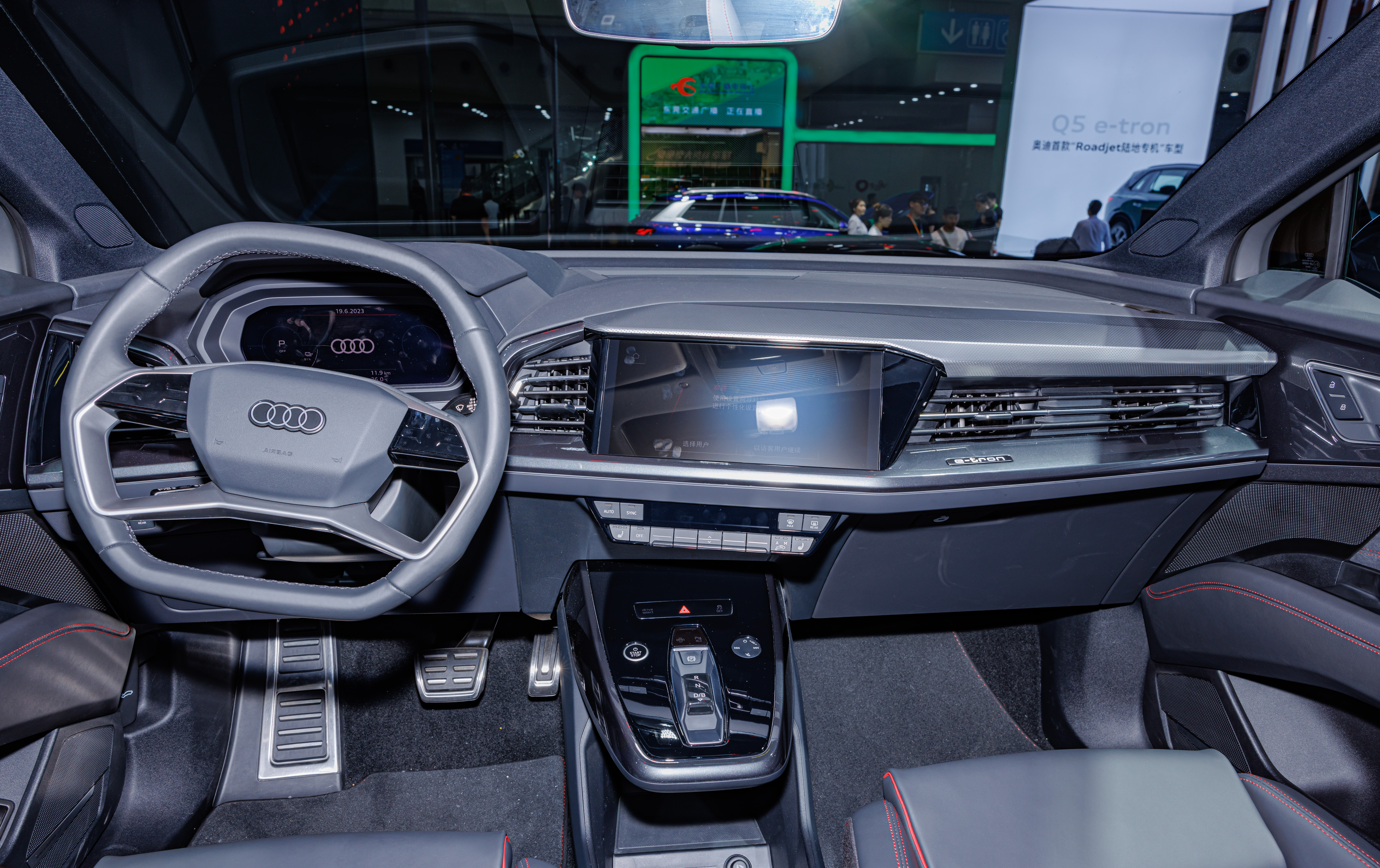
Interior

The Q5 e-tron was revealed at the 2021 Guangzhou Auto Show as the first three-row model of the e-tron series, and the ninth model that is based on the MEB platform. While sporting a separate exterior design, dashboard design is derived from the Q4 e-tron, with a 260 mm (10.25 in) digital instrument cluster and an 290 mm (11.6 in) infotainment touchscreen.

Two variants are offered, which are the Q5 40 e-tron and Q5 50 e-tron quattro. The Q5 40 e-tron is powered by a single 150 kW (201 hp; 204 PS) motor, while the flagship Q5 50 e-tron quattro features a dual-motor setup with 224 kW (301 hp; 305 PS) and all-wheel drive. It is available with an 83.4 kWh battery.

== Sales ==
Year	China
2023	4,751
2024	5,630
2025	2,845
