= Škoda Vision 7S =

Battery electric full-size SUV concept car

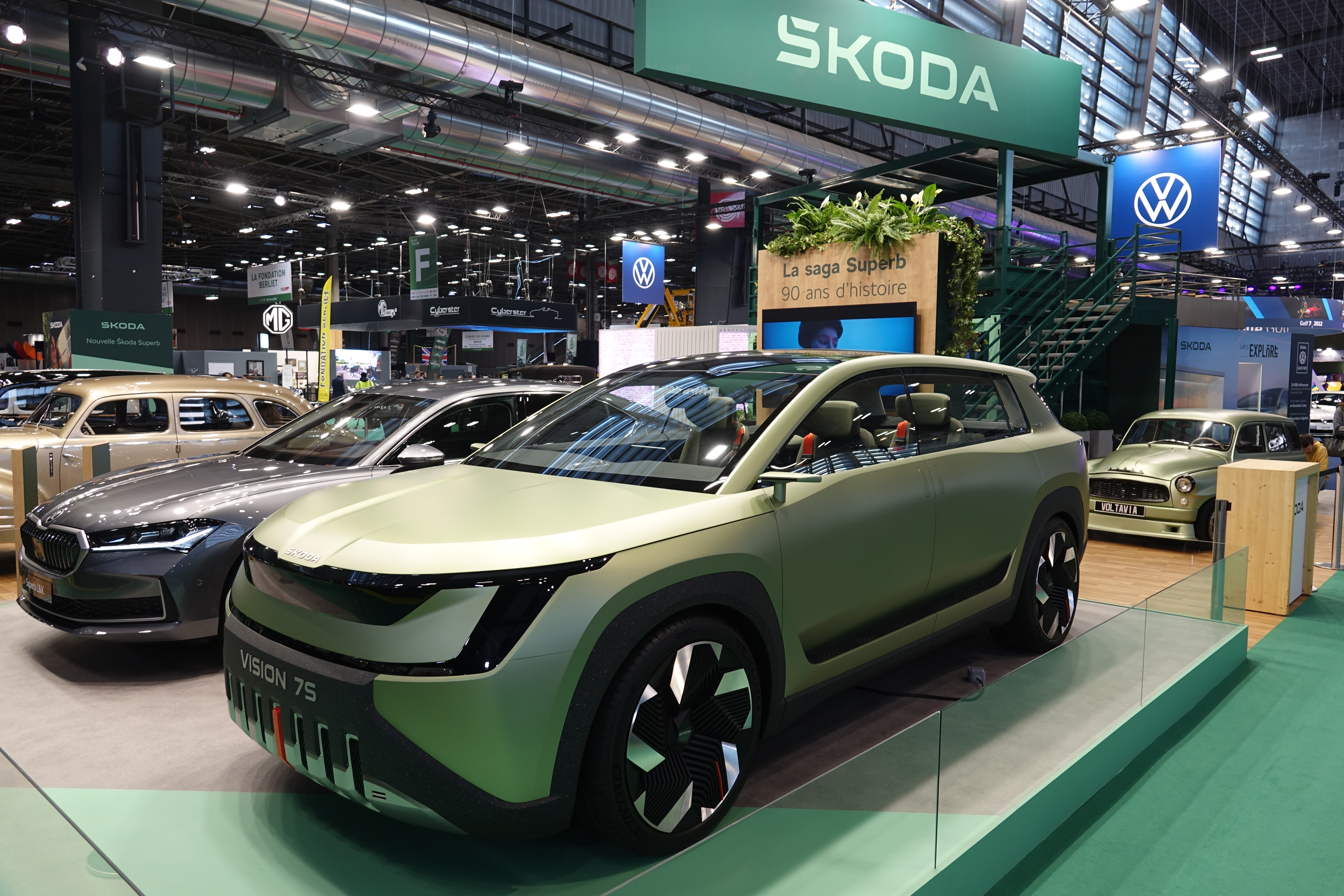

Overview
- Manufacturer: Škoda Auto
- Also called: Škoda Peaq (production)
- Production: 2022 (concept); 2026 (production version)
- Designer: Oliver Stefani (exterior); Lukas Vanek (senior interior lead designer); Katerina Vranova (co-ordinator design colour & trim); Daniel Hájek (HMI senior designer)

Body and chassis
- Class: Full-size crossover SUV (E)
- Body style: 5-door SUV
- Platform: Volkswagen Group MEB
- Related: Audi Q4 e-tron; Cupra Tavascan; Ford Explorer EV; Ford Capri EV; Škoda Enyaq; Škoda Elroq; Volkswagen ID.3; Volkswagen ID.4/ID.5; Volkswagen ID.6; Volkswagen ID.7; Volkswagen ID. Buzz

Powertrain
- Battery: 89 kWh

Dimensions
- Wheelbase: 3,075 mm (121.1 in)
- Length: 5,016 mm (197.5 in)

The Škoda Vision 7S is a battery electric full-size crossover SUV concept car that is the first to adopt Škoda's new Modern Solid design language, which is to be adopted by all its future production models.

== Overview ==
Škoda initially showed the concept on 22 March 2022 with a blurry image of the exterior, and published a sketch of the interior on 15 July. The interior was previewed in full on 16 August, and the exterior was teased once again 7 days later.

On 30 August, Škoda fully unveiled the concept, which is claimed to be an electric replacement for the Kodiaq with a range of 370 mi (595 km).

Shortly after, the Czech manufacturer unveiled its new logo, a continuation of the brand's new design language unveiled with the concept.

=== Design ===
One of the design principles used when designing the Vision 7S according to exterior designer Oliver Stefani was to create something completely new. The dashboard in the interior uses a symmetrical layout. The front bumper uses a large piece of plastic and also has an aluminum skid plate. There are horizontal daytime running lights with the front grille design taken from production Škoda models, but the grille is covered in a dark screen rather than the bars of the production cars. Seven vertical slots are present at both the front and back of the concept. There are 22-inch wheels, no B-pillar, and suicide doors.

=== Features ===
The interior of the Vision 7S has an infotainment screen in portrait orientation with physical climate controls in the center console. Another rotating button for controls is also utilized. The steering wheel is flat on both the top and bottom and has 4 spokes. The steering wheel also has two rotating dials for controlling the infotainment system. A small digital instrument cluster is also present. The dual-configuration interior also has a “relax” mode. A button on the console can be pressed and the 14.6-inch portrait touchscreen rotates to landscape configuration, the rectangular steering wheel and dashboard slide forward to create more space for front-seat occupants, and the front seats rotate inwards and recline. A baby seat is also mounted on the center tunnel.

== Production model ==
On 13 January 2026, it was revealed that the Vision 7S will enter production as the Škoda Peaq later into the year. The production version of the concept will also be the most expensive Škoda model. As with the Enyaq and Elroq, it will use the Volkswagen Group's MEB platform.
