= Plug-in electric vehicles in the Czech Republic =

As of July 2022, there were around 11,000 electric vehicles registered in the Czech Republic, equivalent to 0.1% of all vehicles in the country. As of October 2022, 4% of new cars registered in the Czech Republic were electric or plug-in hybrid.

As of 2021, the Škoda Enyaq was the best-selling electric car in the Czech Republic.

== Government policy ==
As of June 2022, the Czech government does not offer any tax incentives for individuals to purchase electric vehicles.

Starting from 18. 3. 2024, National Development Bank offers up to CZK 300 000 (~11820 €) for buying new BEV or FCEV car for SME. Current fund allocation suffices for up to 7500 vehicles.

BEV, FCEV and Charging station incentives for SME
Type	Category	Minimum price	Maximum price	Incentive
Vehicle	M1	CZK 300 000	CZK 1 500 000	CZK 200 000
Vehicle	N1	CZK 300 000	CZK 2 000 000	CZK 250 000
Vehicle	N2 up to 4,25 t and FCEV	CZK 300 000	CZK 2 500 000	CZK 300 000
Charging station	AC		CZK 100 000	CZK 50 000
Charging station	DC up to 40 kW		CZK 250 000	CZK 100 000
Charging station	DC above 40 kW		CZK 400 000	CZK 150 000

== Charging stations ==
As of October 2022, there were 465 public charging stations in the Czech Republic operated by ČEZ Group.

== Manufacturing ==
As of 2021, around 10% of cars manufactured in the Czech Republic were electric.
