= Škoda Peaq =

Battery electric full-size crossover SUV

Overview
- Manufacturer: Škoda Auto
- Production: August 2026 – present
- Assembly: Czech Republic: Mladá Boleslav

Body and chassis
- Class: Mid-size crossover SUV (D-segment)
- Body style: 5-door crossover SUV
- Layout: Rear-motor, rear-wheel drive (60, 90); Dual-motor, all-wheel drive (90x)
- Platform: Volkswagen Group MEB+

Powertrain
- Electric motor: Rear: permanent-magnet synchronous motor; Front: asynchronous motor (90x)
- Transmission: Single-speed reduction gear
- Battery: 63 kWh gross (59 kWh usable) NMC lithium-ion; 91 kWh gross (86 kWh usable) NMC lithium-ion

Dimensions
- Wheelbase: 2,965 mm (116.7 in)
- Length: 4,874 mm (191.9 in)
- Width: 1,867 mm (73.5 in)
- Height: 1,664 mm (65.5 in)
- Kerb weight: 2,125–2,529 kg (4,685–5,575 lb) (including 75 kg driver; excluding Sportline)

The Škoda Peaq (pronounced "peak" and stylized in all caps) is a battery electric mid-size crossover SUV produced by Škoda Auto since 2026. It is the production version of the Vision 7S concept car unveiled in 2022. It entered production in August 2026.

It is based on the MEB platform and went on sale in August 2026. The Peaq name was revealed on 13 January 2026.

== Design and interior ==
The Peaq uses Škoda's Modern Solid design language, introduced with the Vision 7S concept in 2022. Its front end has a black Tech-Deck panel, with T-shaped lights at the front and rear.

The cabin has a vertically mounted 13.6-inch touchscreen, the first in a Škoda model. Its infotainment system runs Android Automotive and includes an app store offering third-party applications. Physical controls below the screen adjust the temperature, fan speed and audio volume.

The five-seat version has a 935-litre luggage compartment. In the seven-seat version, capacity is 299 litres with all seats upright, or 890 litres with the third row folded. A separate 37-litre compartment under the bonnet provides storage for charging cables.

Rear view

Interior

== Powertrain ==
The Peaq 60 and 90 have a single rear motor. The 90x adds a front motor for all-wheel drive. Both batteries use nickel–manganese–cobalt (NMC) chemistry.

Version	Drive	Maximum output	Battery capacity (gross / usable)	WLTP range (up to)	Maximum DC charging power
60	Rear-wheel drive	150 kW (204 PS)	63 / 59 kWh	459 km (285 mi)	160 kW
90	Rear-wheel drive	210 kW (286 PS)	91 / 86 kWh	647 km (402 mi)	199 kW
90x	All-wheel drive	220 kW (299 PS)	91 / 86 kWh	613 km (381 mi)	199 kW

Figures exclude Sportline versions and vary with configuration. All versions accept up to 11 kW from an AC charger. Škoda quotes 27 minutes for a 10–80% charge in the 60, and 28 minutes in the 90 and 90x. Charging times vary with battery temperature, state of charge and the charger.

== Safety and driver assistance ==
The Peaq comes with Front Assist, Lane Assist, Side Assist and Crossroad Assist as standard. Crossroad Assist uses radar sensors in the front bumper to detect vehicles, cyclists and other road users approaching from the sides.

Optional Travel Assist 3.0 combines adaptive cruise control and lane guidance with traffic-jam and emergency assistance. It uses online traffic data to adjust speed and can bring the vehicle to a stop at red traffic lights. The Peaq also has a driver-monitoring camera that tracks eye movements to assess driver attention.

== Reception ==
Top Gear praised the Peaq's comfort, quiet cabin and space, though it criticised the brake-pedal feel and charging speed. CompleteCar.ie singled out the ride comfort with optional adaptive dampers and praised the interior finish.

FDM found the Peaq spacious and good value, with comfortable seating in the first two rows. It considered the third row more suitable for occasional use.
