= Škoda Elroq =

Battery electric compact crossover SUV

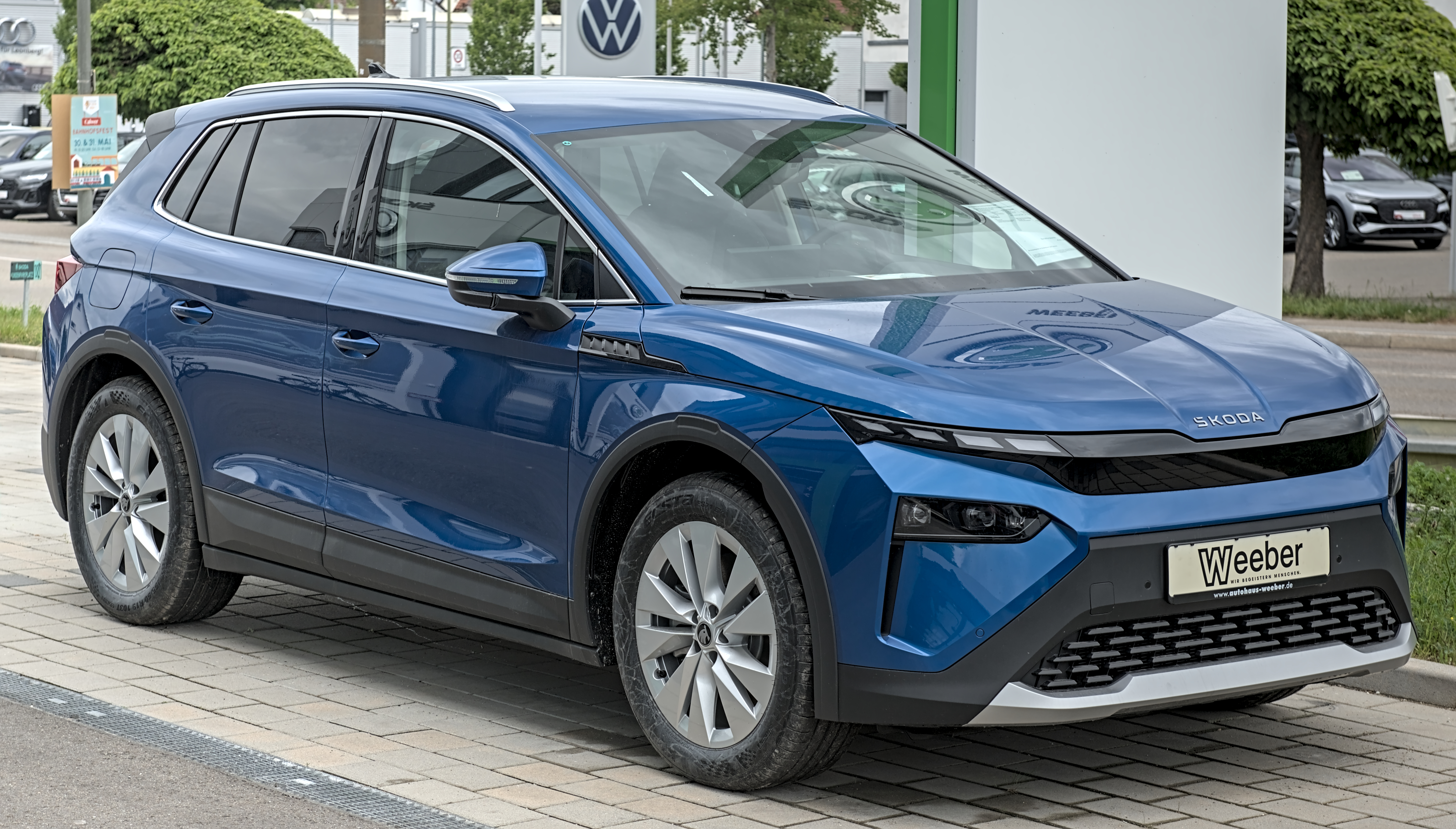

Overview
- Manufacturer: Škoda Auto
- Production: January 2025 – present
- Assembly: Czech Republic: Mladá Boleslav

Body and chassis
- Class: Compact crossover SUV
- Body style: 5-door SUV
- Layout: Rear-motor, rear-wheel-drive; Dual-motor, four-wheel-drive
- Platform: Volkswagen Group MEB
- Related: Škoda Enyaq

Powertrain
- Electric motor: Permanent magnet synchronous motor
- Power output: 125–250 kW (168–335 hp)
- Battery: 55–84 kWh lithium-ion (gross)

Dimensions
- Wheelbase: 2,765 mm (108.9 in)
- Length: 4,488 mm (176.7 in)
- Width: 1,884 mm (74.2 in)
- Height: 1,625 mm (64.0 in)

The Škoda Elroq is a battery-electric compact crossover SUV produced by the Czech manufacturer Škoda Auto. It shares the Volkswagen Group's MEB platform with the larger Škoda Enyaq and is offered as an electric alternative to the Škoda Karoq.

Unveiled in Prague on 1 October 2024, the Elroq was Škoda's first production model to use its "Modern Solid" design language. Production began at the company's Mladá Boleslav plant in January 2025.

== History ==
Škoda announced the Elroq name in April 2023 for a forthcoming compact electric SUV. Reviews of camouflaged pre-production cars appeared in July 2024, ahead of the production model's unveiling.

Škoda unveiled the Elroq in Prague on 1 October 2024. It was the first production model to use the company's "Modern Solid" design language, introduced with the Vision 7S concept.

Series production began on 22 January 2025 at Škoda's main plant in Mladá Boleslav, Czech Republic, on an assembly line shared with the Enyaq and Octavia. To make space for Elroq production, Škoda had moved part of Octavia production to its Kvasiny plant in 2024.

The Elroq RS was unveiled on 3 April 2025. Its two electric motors deliver a combined 250 kW and provide all-wheel drive. Škoda built 112,500 Elroqs in 2025.

In March 2026, Škoda announced updates introduced from mid-2026. Newly produced vehicles adopted an infotainment system based on Android Automotive, with a redesigned interface and an app store offering third-party applications, as well as a 21-litre front luggage compartment, one-pedal driving and vehicle-to-load capability.

== Powertrain ==
The Elroq 50, 60 and 85 have a single electric motor driving the rear wheels. The 85x and RS have a second motor driving the front wheels, giving them all-wheel drive.

Version	Drive	2025 specifications	2027 model year
50	Rear-wheel drive	125 kW / 52 kWh	Not listed
60	Rear-wheel drive	150 kW / 59 kWh	140 kW / 58 kWh
85	Rear-wheel drive	210 kW / 77 kWh	210 kW / 77 kWh
85x	All-wheel drive	210 kW / 77 kWh	220 kW / 77 kWh
RS	All-wheel drive	250 kW / 79 kWh	250 kW / 77 kWh

All versions support AC charging at up to 11 kW. The battery can be preheated before fast charging, either manually or through the navigation system.

For the 2027 model year, Škoda announced that the Elroq 60 would use a LFP battery, while the 85, 85x and RS would retain nickel manganese cobalt batteries. The company quoted 10–80% charging times of 26 minutes for the Elroq 60 and 29 minutes for the other versions.

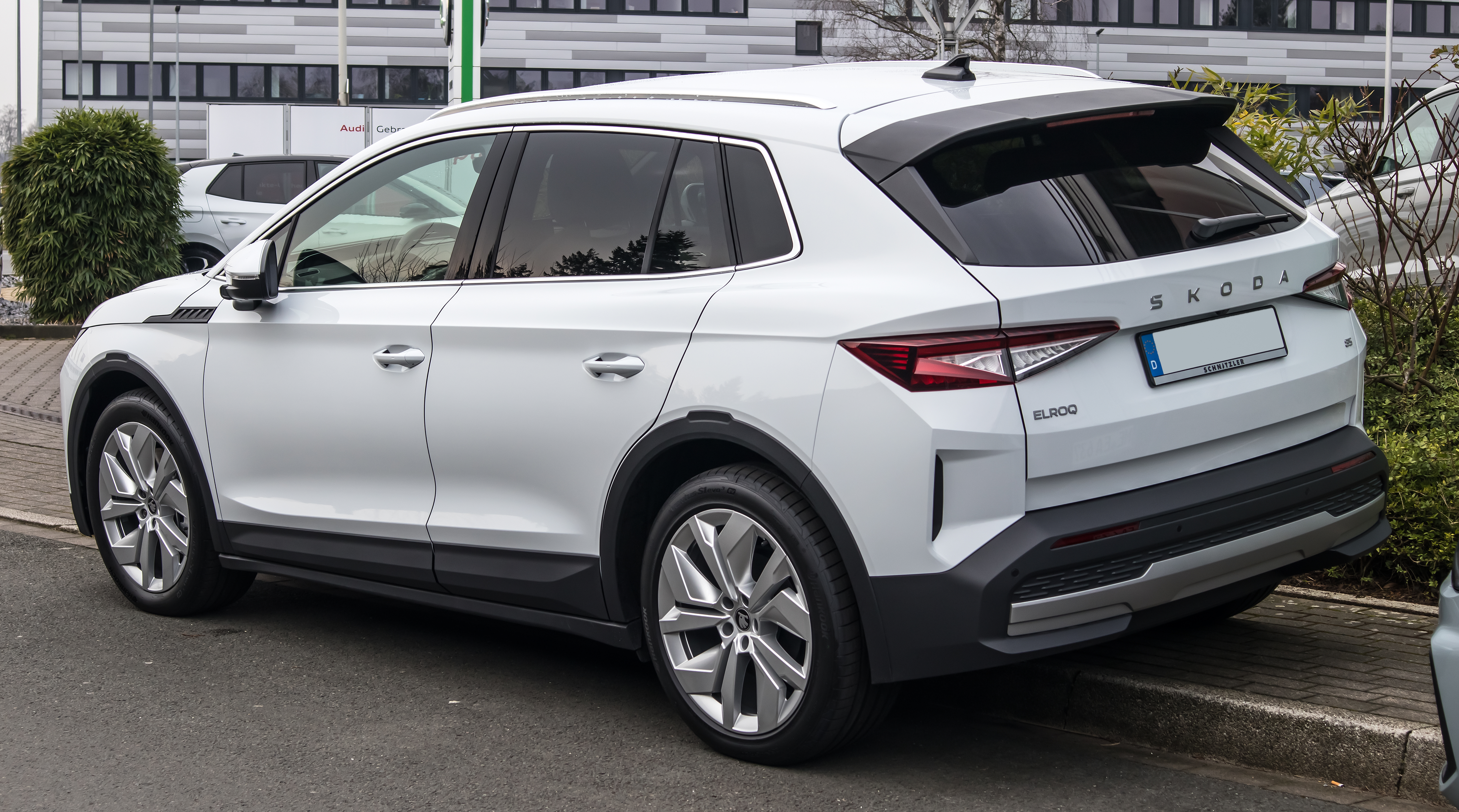
Rear view

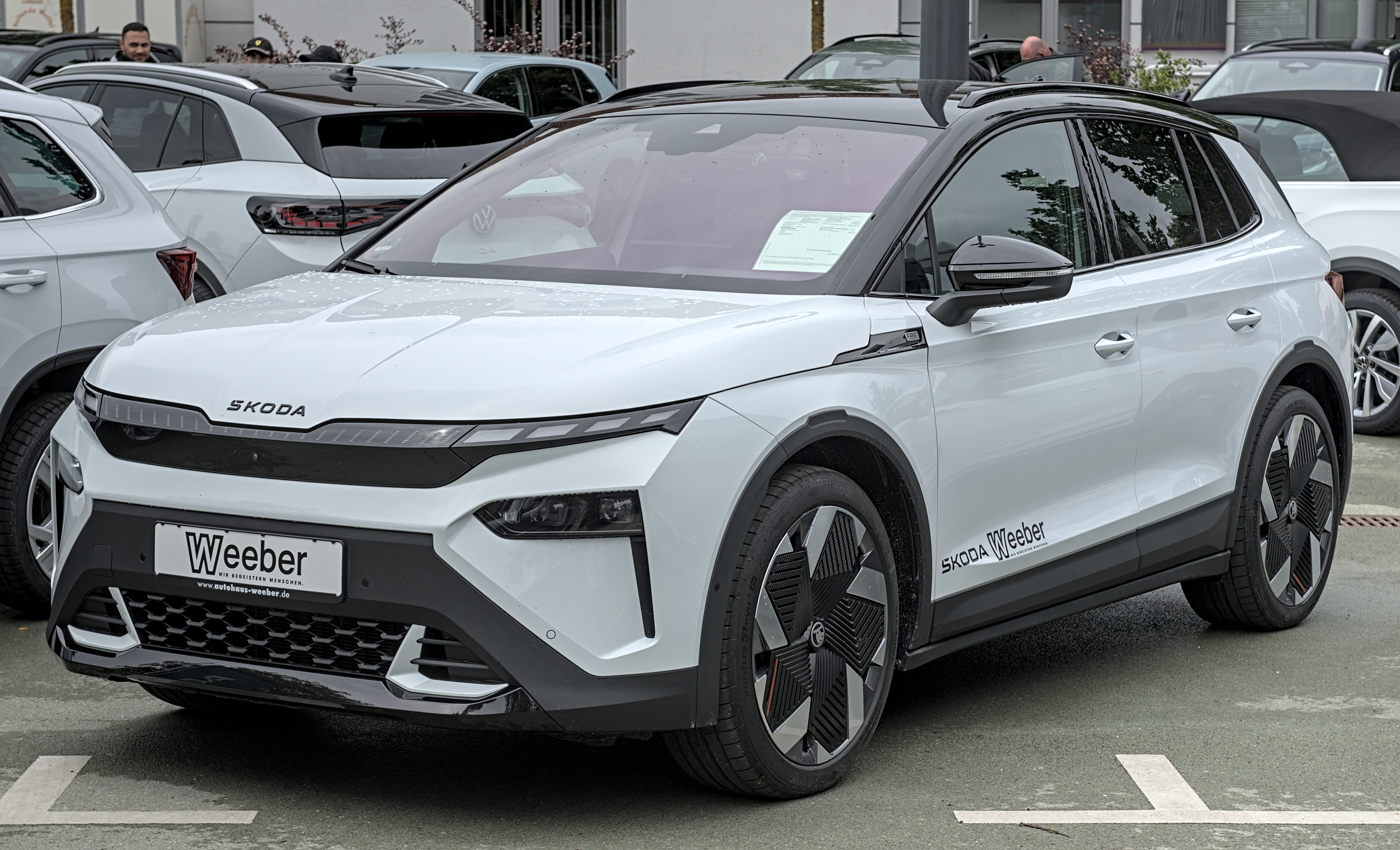
Škoda Elroq First Edition

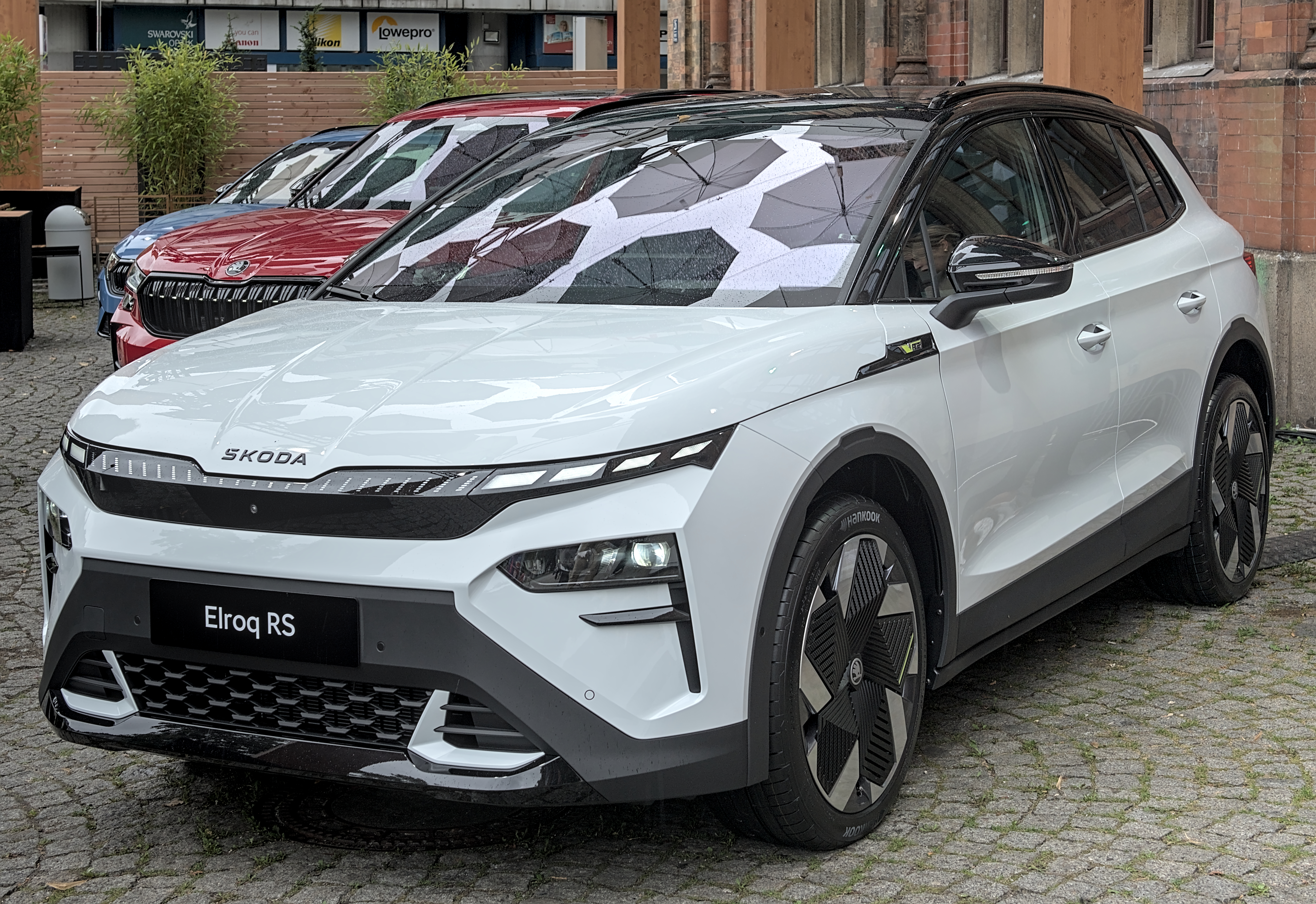
Škoda Elroq RS

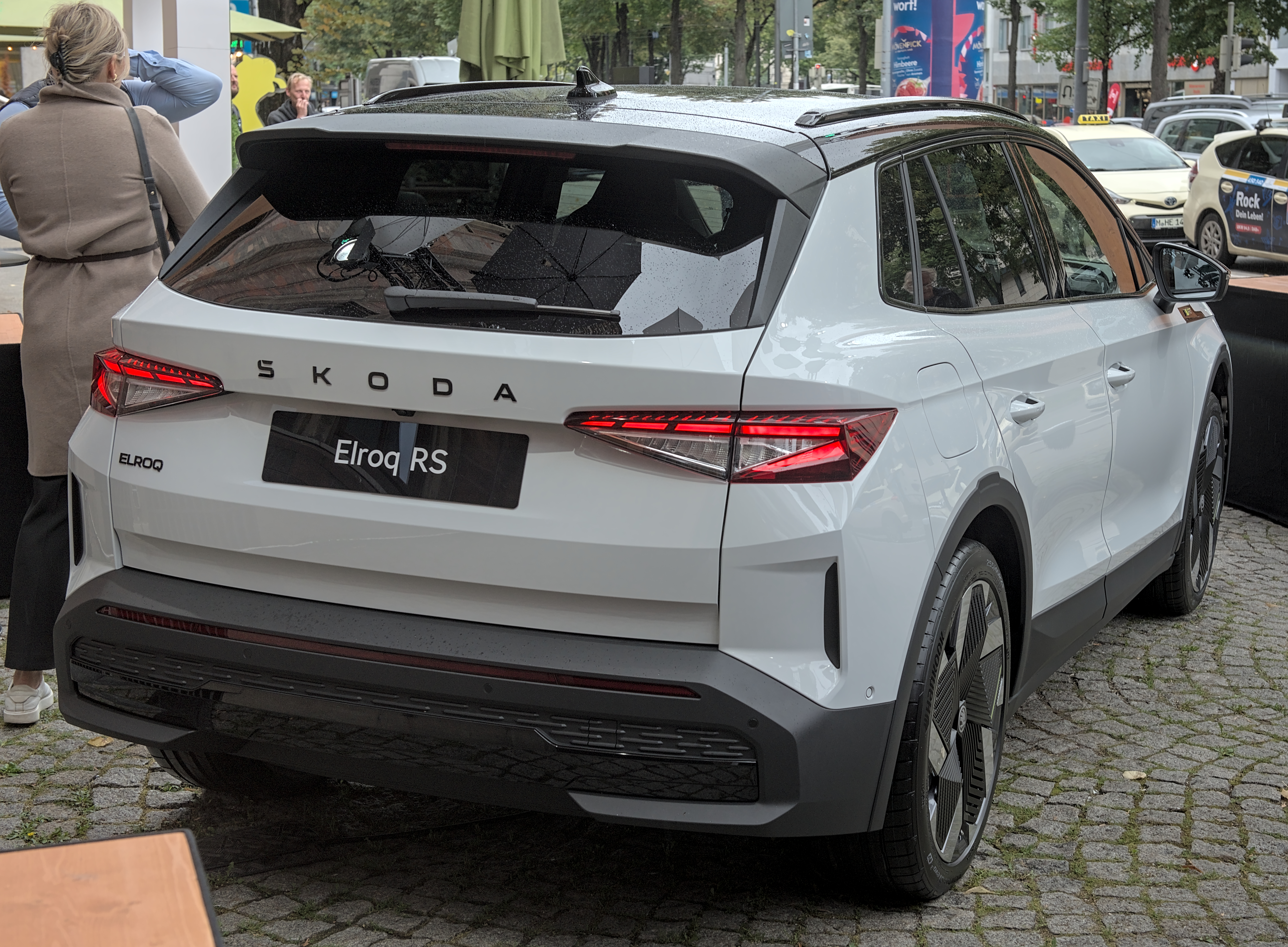
Rear view

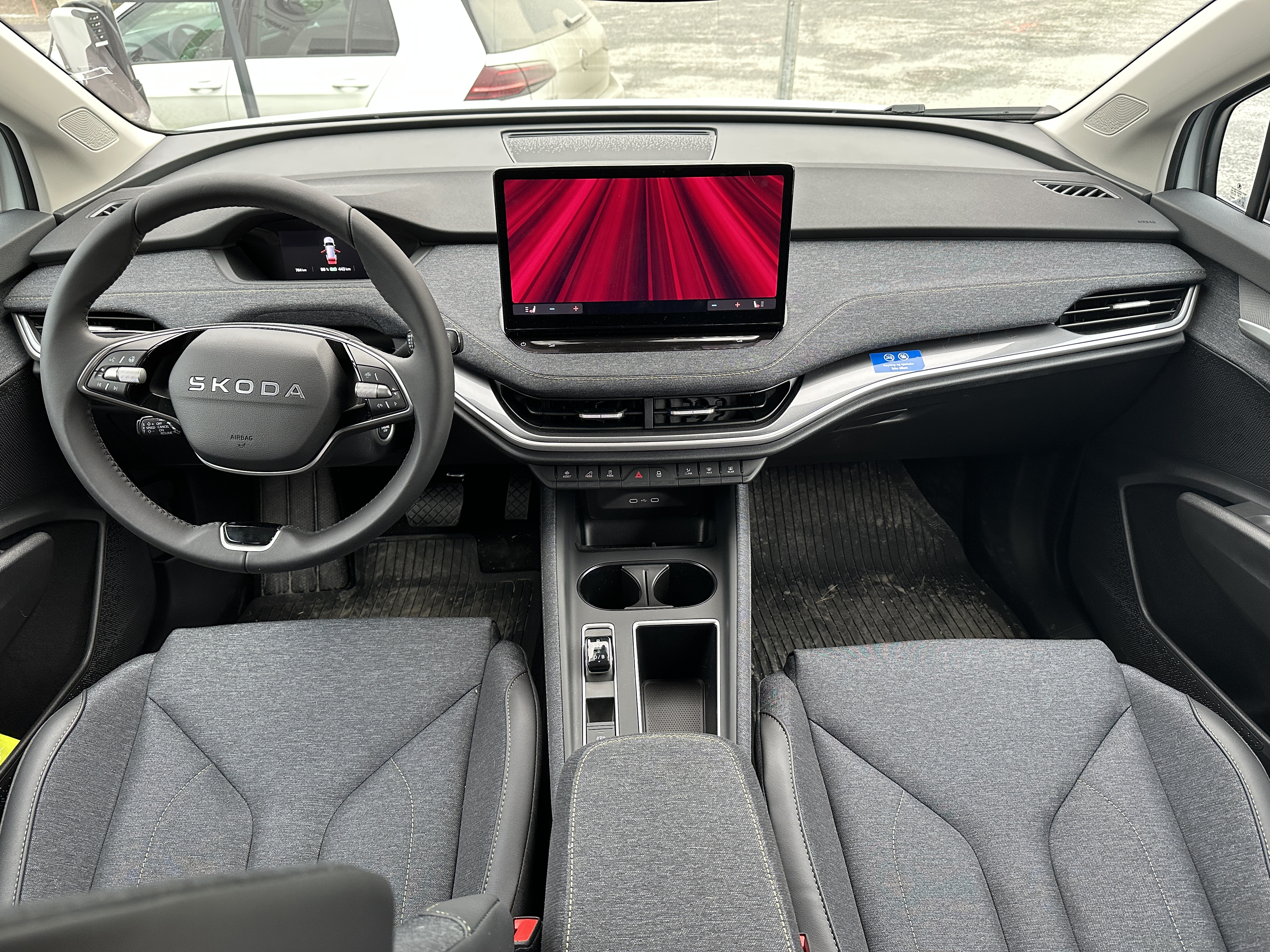
Interior

== Safety ==
Euro NCAP test results Škoda Elroq 85 (LHD) (2025)
Test	Points	%
Overall:	5 /5 stars	
Adult occupant:	36.1	90%
Child occupant:	43.0	87%
Pedestrian:	48.6	77%
Safety assist:	14.2	78%

The Elroq has Front Assist as standard, with automatic emergency braking for pedestrians and cyclists. Travel Assist combines adaptive cruise control and lane guidance with traffic-jam and emergency assistance. Data from other Volkswagen Group vehicles helps Travel Assist adjust the car’s speed and follow lanes with incomplete road markings. An update introduced in 2026 brought Travel Assist 3.0, with revised sensors and improved lane-change assistance. Crossroad Assist uses corner radars to detect objects approaching from the sides at junctions. Emergency Assist can move the car onto the motorway hard shoulder if the driver fails to respond.

== Sales ==
Škoda delivered 95,300 Elroqs worldwide in 2025, its first year on sale. It was Europe’s second-best-selling battery-electric car that year.

Worldwide deliveries reached 92,200 in January–September 2026, up 52.7% from the same period in 2025. In Germany and Denmark, it led battery-electric car sales during that period.

== Reception ==
Auto Express praised the Elroq’s space, interior quality, comfort and value, but criticised the brake feel and the use of touchscreen controls for the climate system.

=== Awards ===
The Elroq won Auto Express’s 2025 Car of the Year award and finished second in the 2026 European Car of the Year.
