= Škoda Enyaq =

Battery electric mid-size crossover SUV

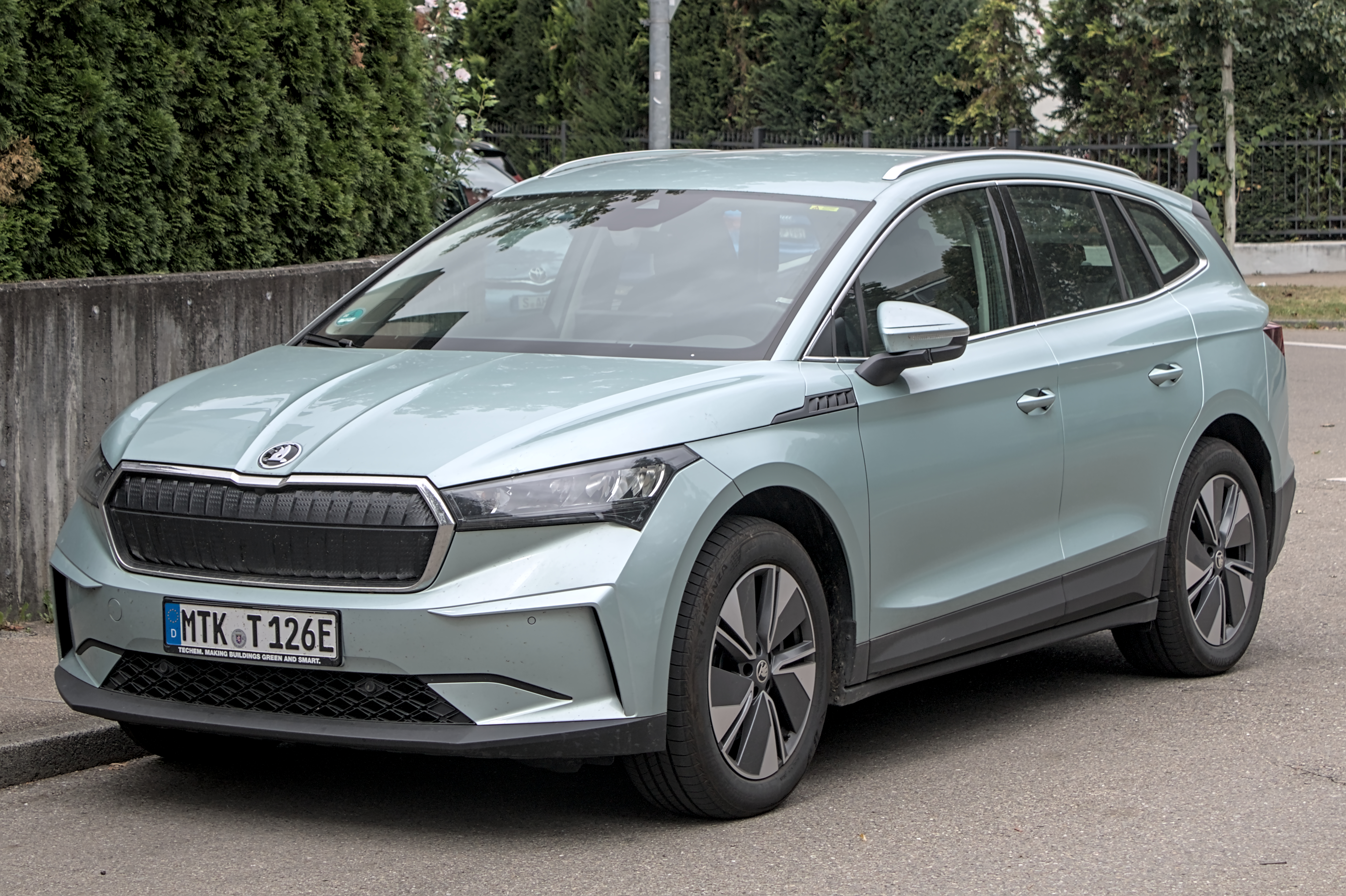

Overview
- Manufacturer: Škoda Auto
- Production: November 2020–present; February 2022–present (Enyaq Coupe)
- Assembly: Czech Republic: Mladá Boleslav
- Designer: Omer Halilhodžić, Dalibor Pantůček, Sajdin Osmančević

Body and chassis
- Class: Mid-size crossover SUV (D)
- Body style: 5-door SUV; 5-door coupé SUV (Enyaq Coupe); 5-door panel van (Enyaq Cargo)
- Layout: 80X and RS: Dual-motor, all-wheel-drive; 50, 60, 80 and 85: Rear-motor, rear-wheel drive
- Platform: Volkswagen Group MEB
- Related: Volkswagen ID.4; Volkswagen ID.5; Volkswagen ID.6; Audi Q4 e-tron; Audi Q5 e-tron

Powertrain
- Electric motor: Permanent Magnet Synchronous Motor on Rear Axle: 50: 109 kW (146 hp); 60: 132 kW (177 hp); 80: 150 kW (200 hp); 85: 210 kW (280 hp); Asynchronous motors (ASMs) on Front Axle and Permanent Magnet Synchronous Motor on Rear Axle: 80X: 195 kW (261 hp); 85X: 210 kW (280 hp); RS (2021-2023): 225 kW (302 hp); RS (2024-): 250 kW (340 hp)
- Battery: 80, 85, 80X and RS: 82 (77 usable) kWh lithium-ion, liquid-cooled; 60: 62 (58 usable) kWh lithium-ion; 50: 55 (52 usable) kWh lithium-ion
- Electric range: RS (2024-): 542 km (337 mi) (WLTP); 80X and RS (2021-2023): 460 km (286 mi) (WLTP); 85X: 539 km (335 mi) (WLTP); 85: 566 km (352 mi) (WLTP); 80: 500 km (311 mi) (WLTP); 60: 390 km (242 mi) (WLTP); 50: 340 km (211 mi) (WLTP)
- Plug-in charging: 50 kW DC charging standard optional paid upgrade to 125 kW DC charging for 80, 80X and RS, 100 kW for 50 and 60; AC charging: 7.7 kW or 11 kW 3-phase (in Europe) on-board charger

Dimensions
- Wheelbase: 2,765 mm (108.9 in)
- Length: 4,648 mm (183.0 in)
- Width: 1,877 mm (73.9 in)
- Height: 1,618 mm (63.7 in)

The Škoda Enyaq, originally introduced as the Škoda Enyaq iV, is a battery-electric mid-size crossover SUV manufactured by Škoda Auto. It was Škoda's first production model based on the Volkswagen Group's MEB platform, which it shares with the Volkswagen ID.4.

Škoda unveiled the Enyaq in Prague in September 2020 and began production that November. Škoda added the Enyaq Coupé in 2022 and facelifted both body styles in 2025.

== Name ==
The name is derived from the Irish name Enya, which originates from the Gaelic word ‘eithne’, meaning ‘essence, spirit or principle’. The Enyaq is the first model of a new naming convention within the Škoda's range where electric models' names will start with ‘E’.

== Overview ==
Škoda presented the Enyaq iV in Prague on 1 September 2020 and began production in Mladá Boleslav on 25 November that year. Customer deliveries followed in 2021. It was the first Škoda to use Volkswagen Group’s MEB platform.

The original range was announced with three battery capacities and a choice of rear-wheel or all-wheel drive. Rear-wheel-drive versions have a motor on the rear axle, while all-wheel-drive versions add a second motor at the front. The SUV has a boot capacity of 585 litres, increasing to 1,710 litres with the rear seats folded.

Škoda presented the Laurin & Klement trim in May 2023, with different interior finishes and additional standard equipment. The Enyaq 85 and 85x replaced the 80 and 80x for the 2024 model year. Both had a system output of 210 kW, while the RS increased to 250 kW. These versions gained battery preconditioning and new infotainment software. The “iV” suffix was dropped from the Enyaq name. Production of the updated 85, 85x and RS versions began in November 2023.

In March 2026, Škoda announced updates to the Enyaq that entered production in mid-2026. These included a redesigned infotainment system running Android Automotive, with an integrated app store for third-party applications. The updated model also got a 21-litre front luggage compartment, one-pedal driving and vehicle-to-load capability.

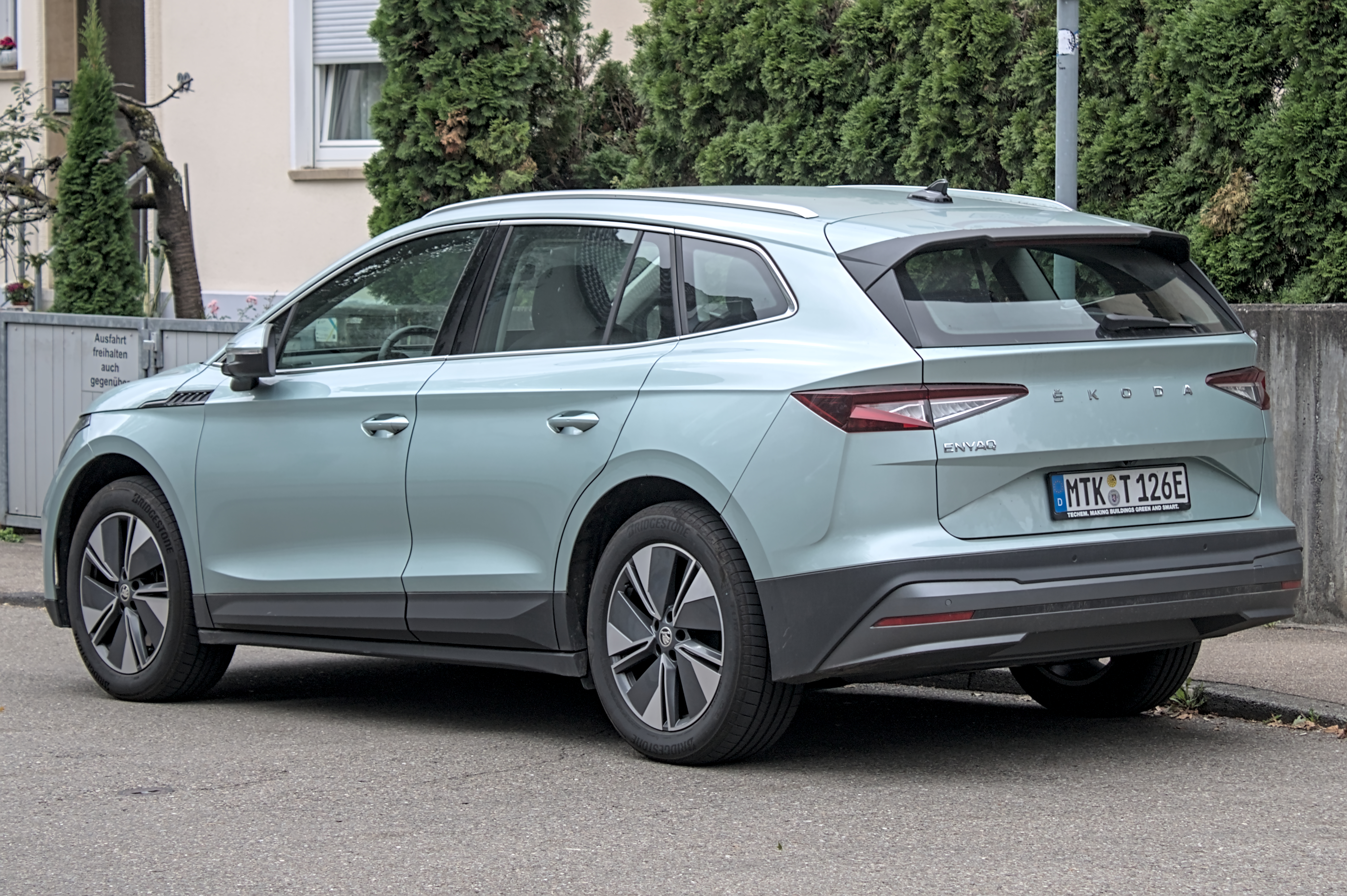
Rear view

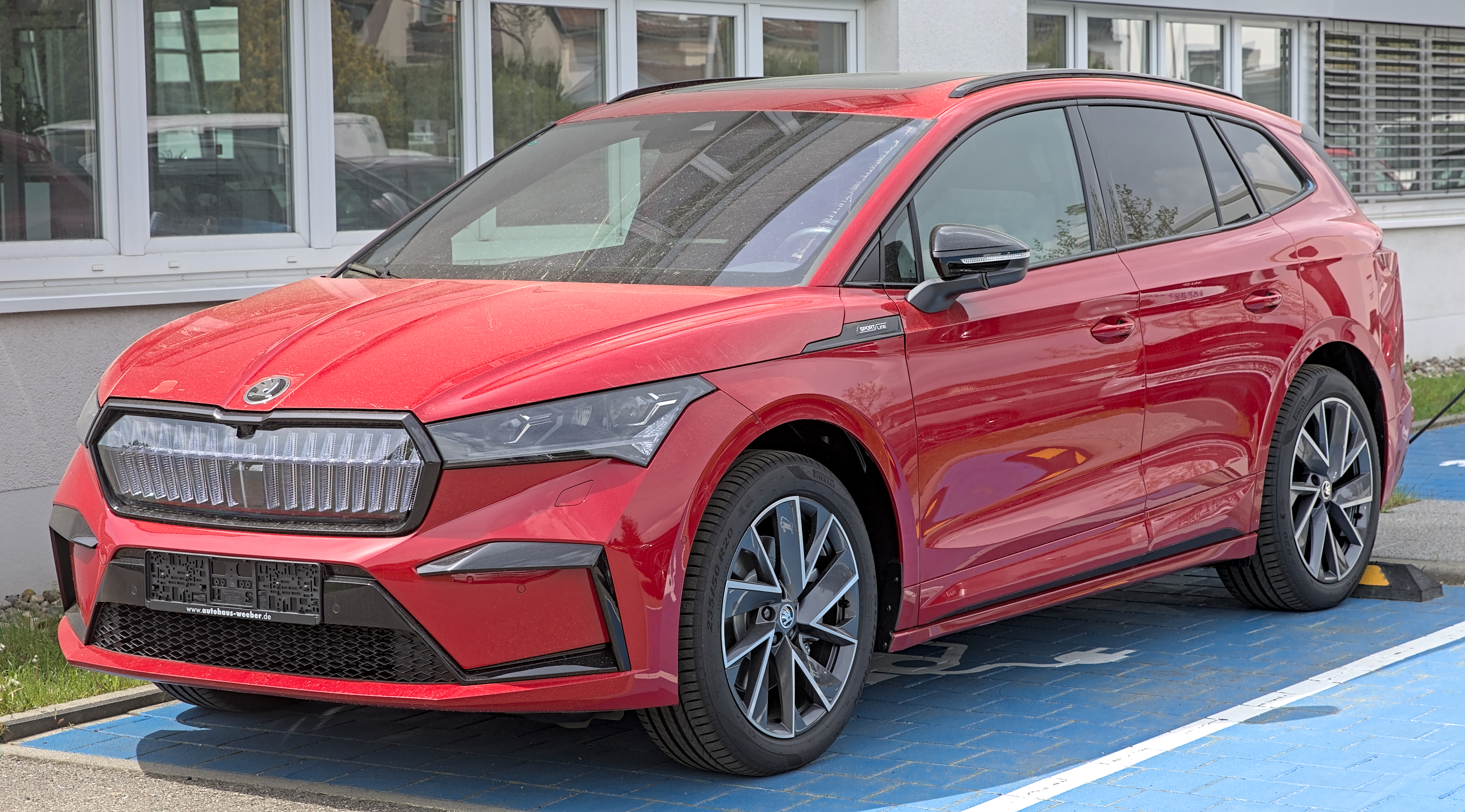
Škoda Enyaq Sportline

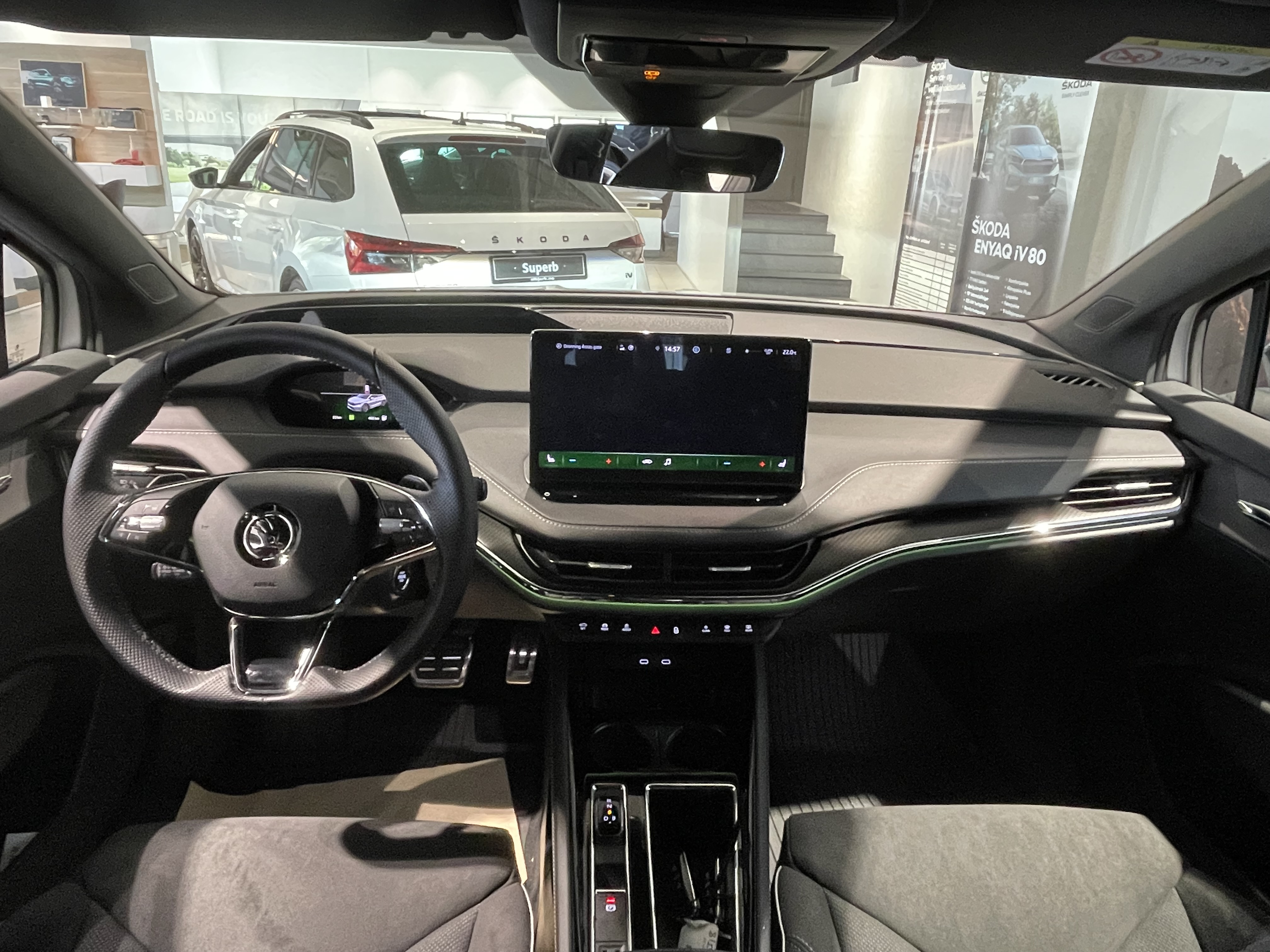
Interior

=== Enyaq Coupé ===
Škoda unveiled the Enyaq Coupé iV on 31 January 2022. Production began on 14 February 2022 in Mladá Boleslav, on the same assembly line as the Enyaq iV and Octavia. The original range included an all-wheel-drive RS version and offered two battery sizes, with gross capacities of 62 and 82 kWh.

The Coupé has a sloping rear roofline and a 570-litre boot, compared with 585 litres in the standard Enyaq. Škoda quoted a drag coefficient as low as 0.234.

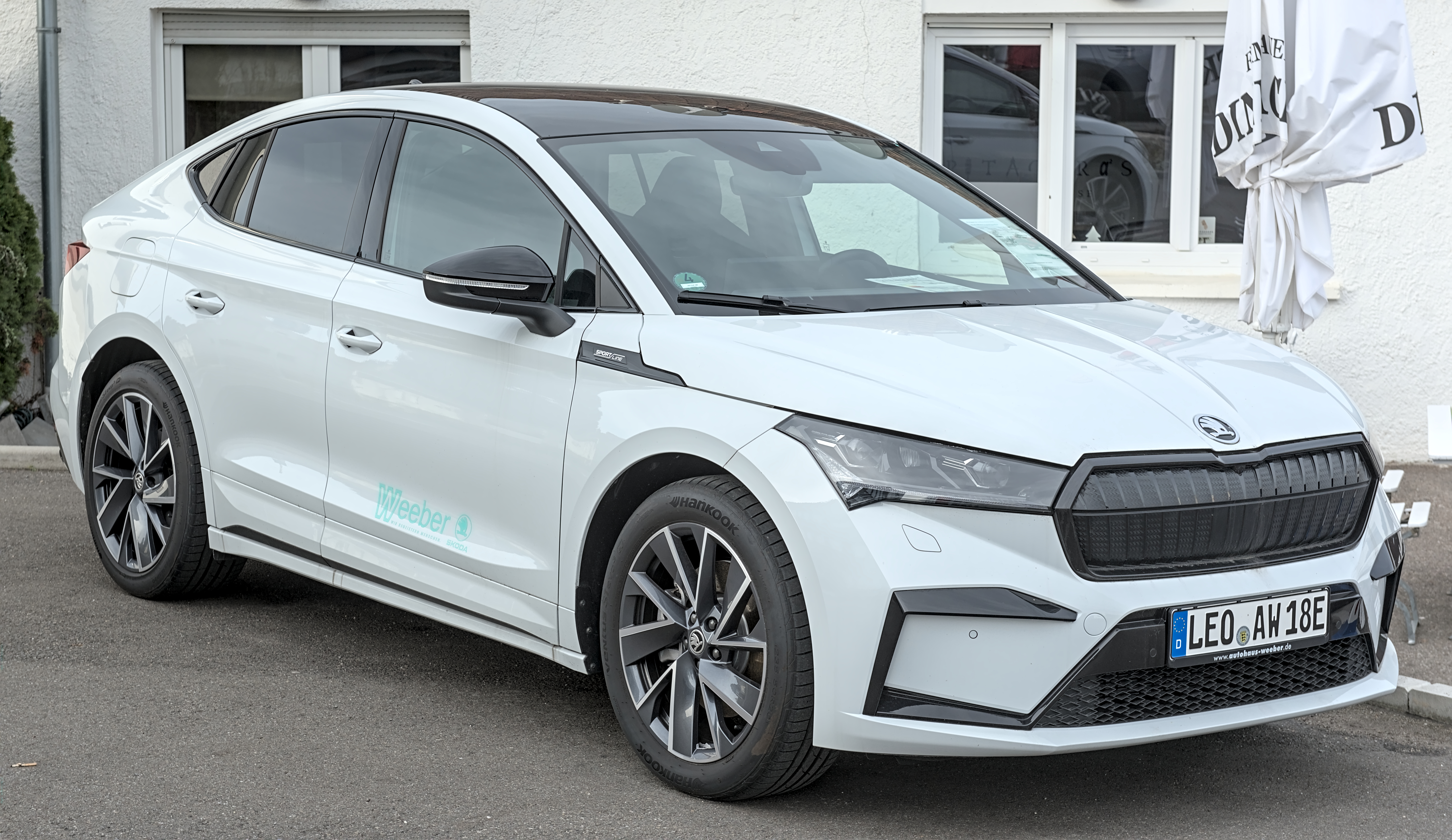
Enyaq Coupé

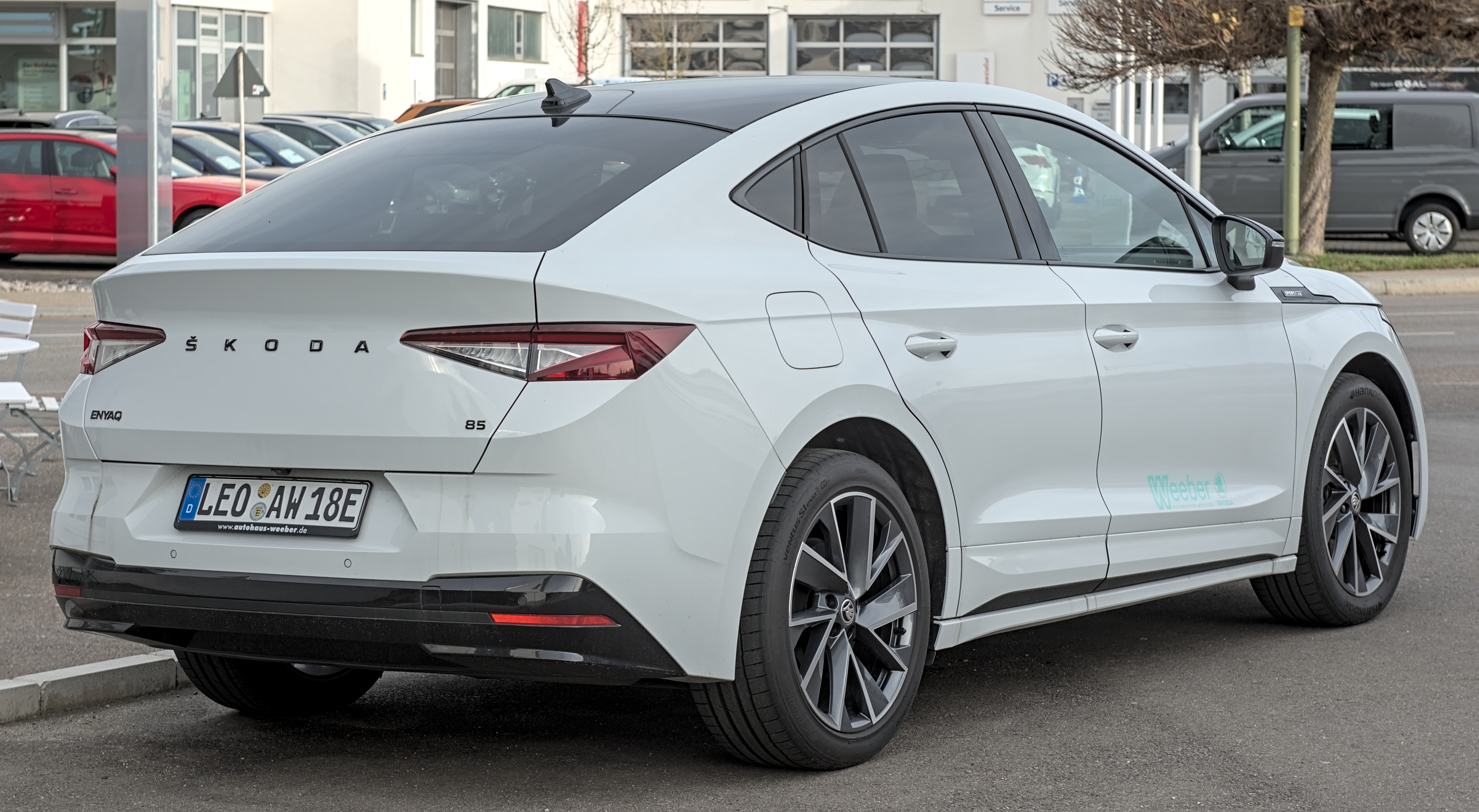
Rear view

=== Enyaq RS and Enyaq Coupé RS ===
Škoda unveiled the Enyaq Coupé RS iV in January 2022 and added an RS version of the SUV later that year. Both had all-wheel drive, with one motor on each axle and a combined output of 220 kW. Their battery had a gross capacity of 82 kWh, of which 77 kWh was usable.

Output increased to 250 kW for the 2024 model year. The facelifted RS models retained that output in 2025 and gained a battery with 84 kWh gross capacity and 79 kWh usable.

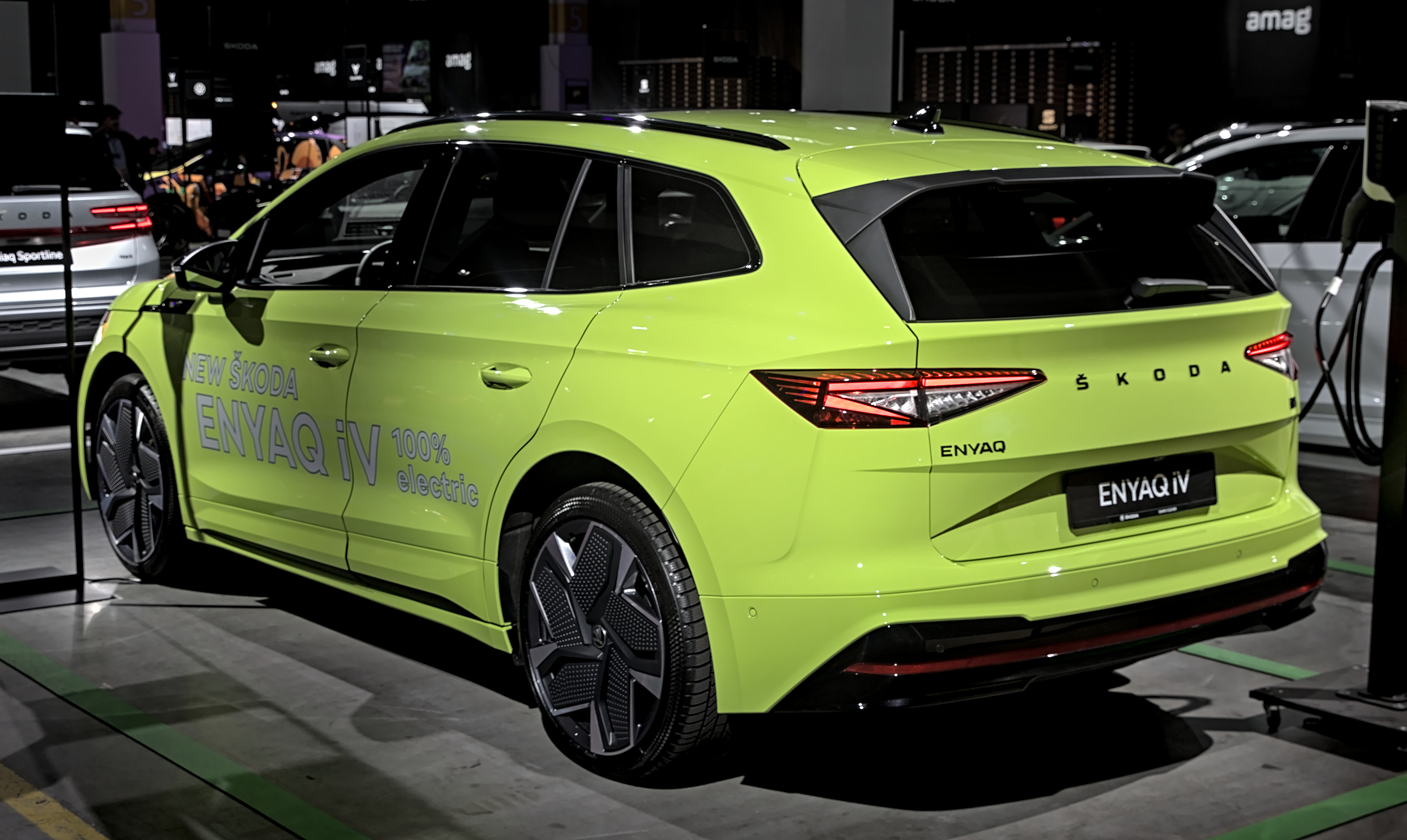
Škoda Enyaq iV RS

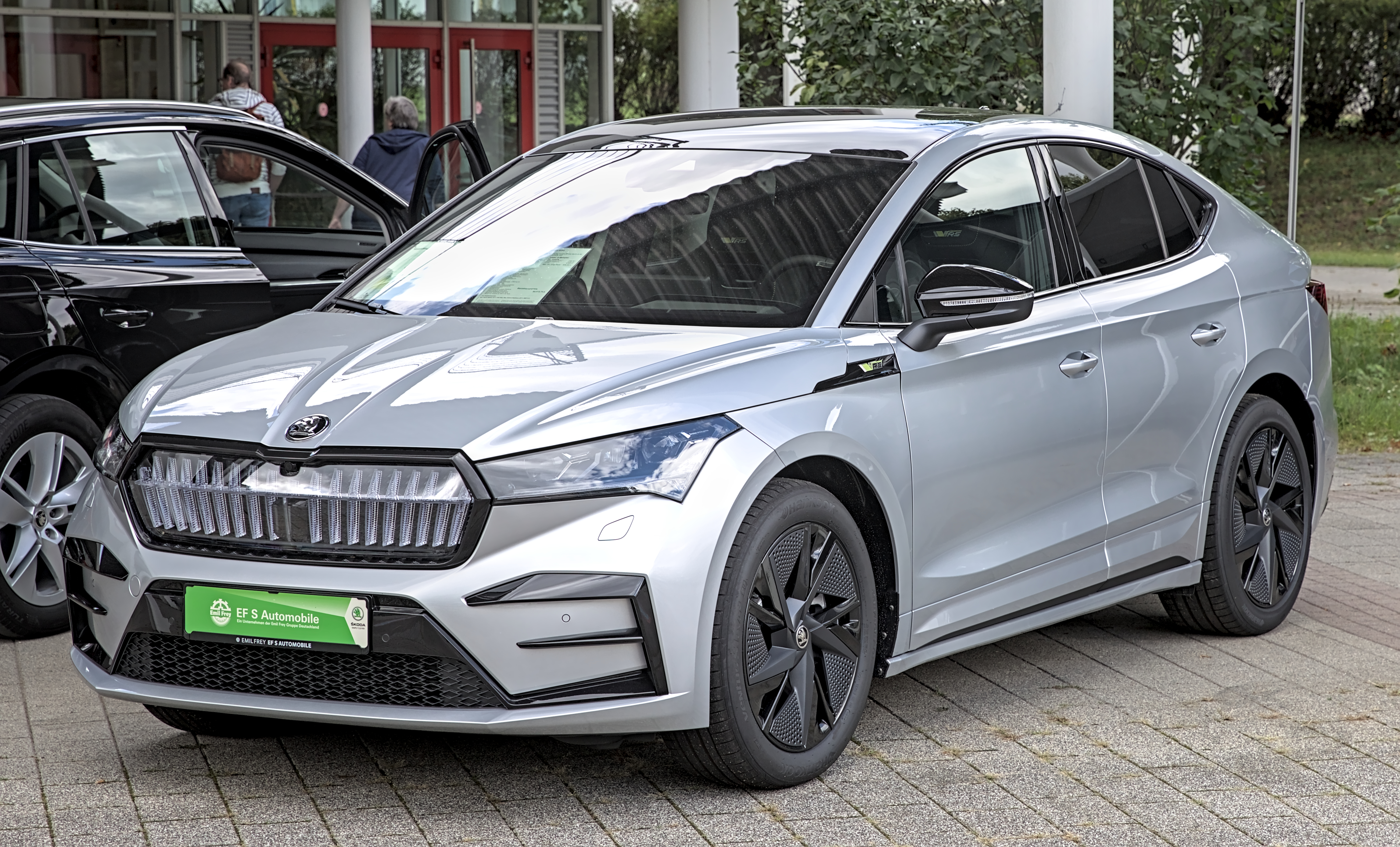
Škoda Enyaq Coupe iV RS

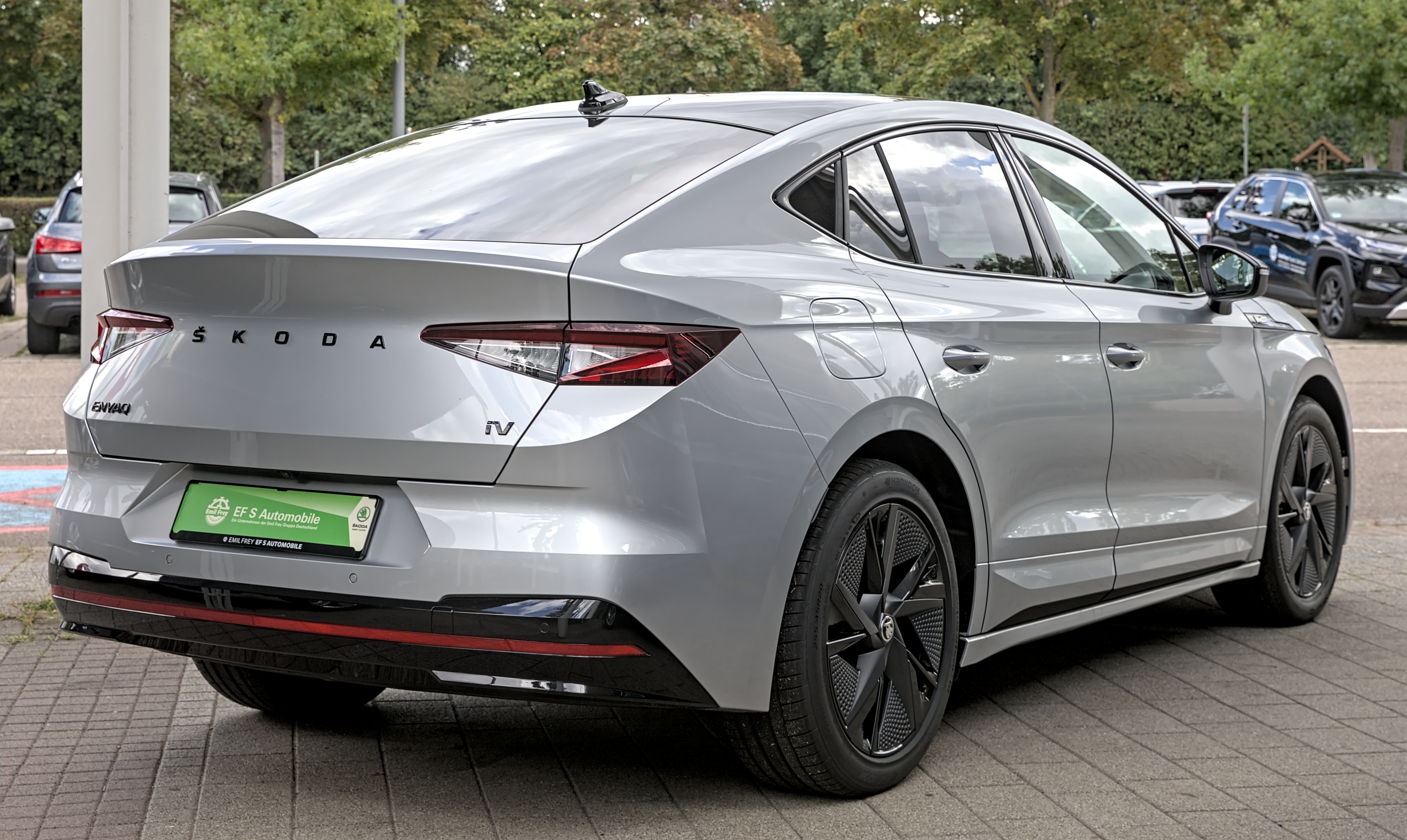
Rear view

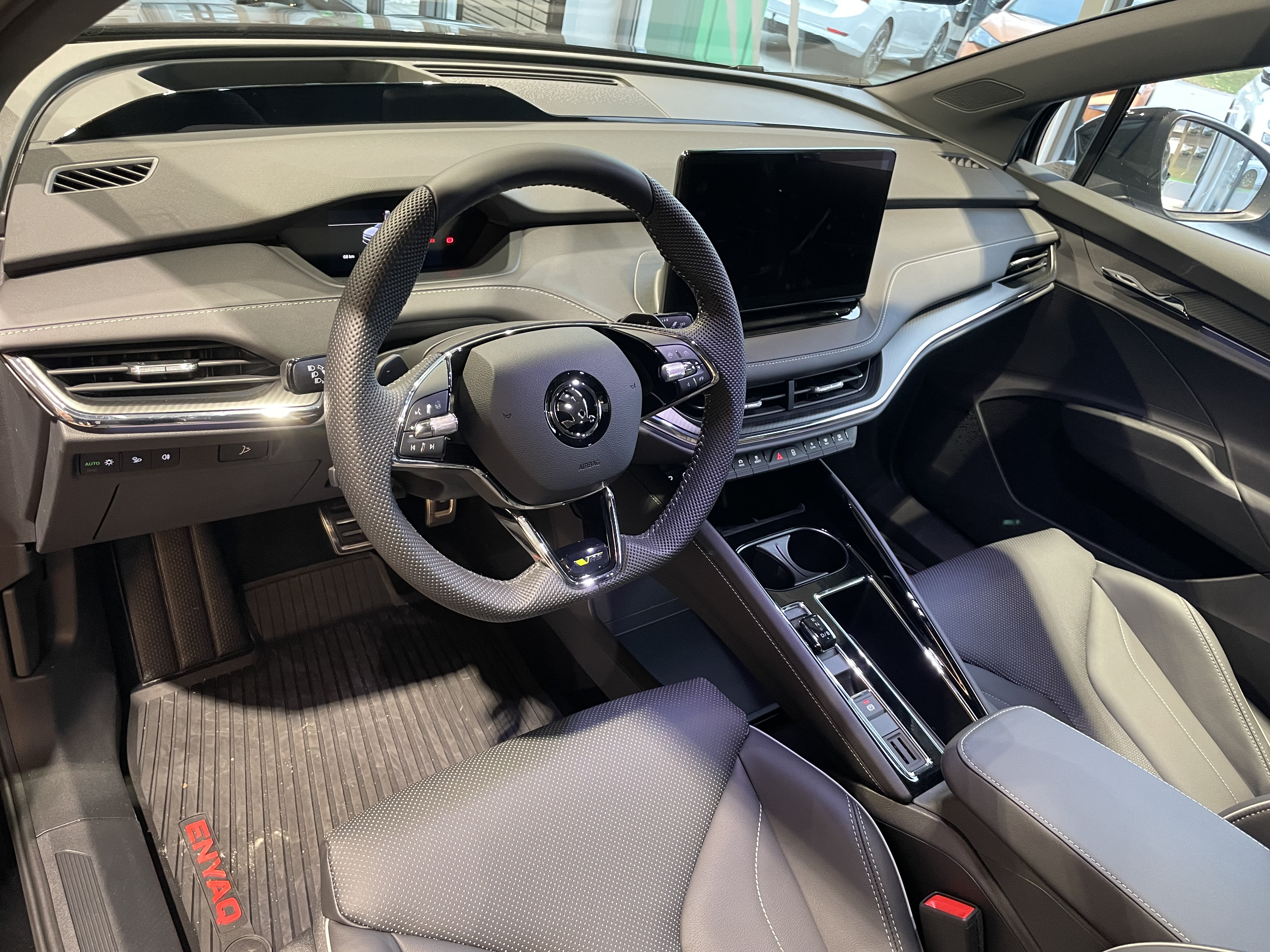
Škoda Enyaq Coupe iV RS interior

=== Facelift ===
Škoda released the facelifted Enyaq and Enyaq Coupé on 8 January 2025. Both received a redesigned front in Škoda's Modern Solid design language, first used on the smaller Elroq. The minimum drag coefficient fell from 0.256 to 0.245 for the Enyaq and from 0.234 to 0.225 for the Coupé. Production of both models began at Mladá Boleslav in February 2025.

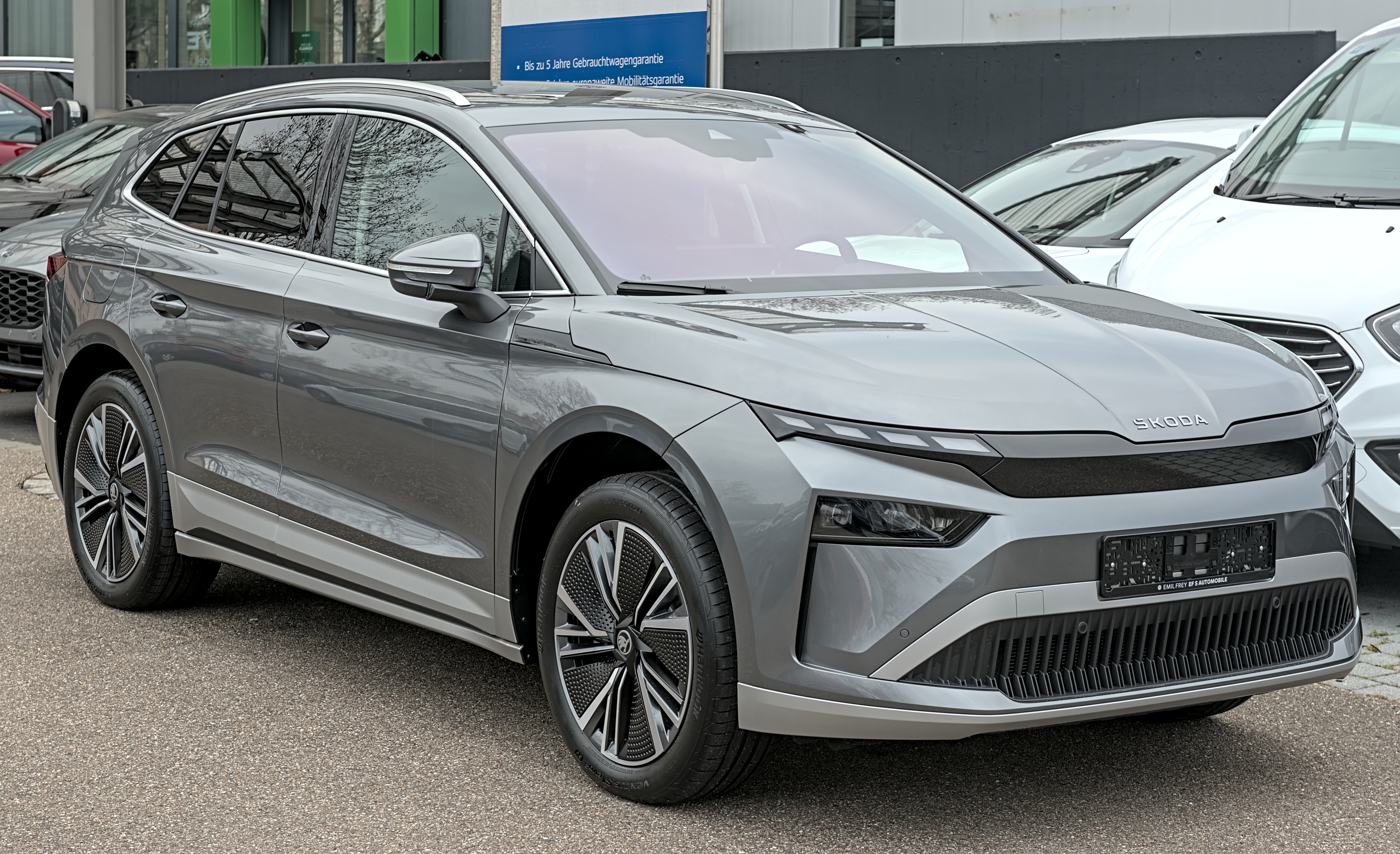
2025 Škoda Enyaq

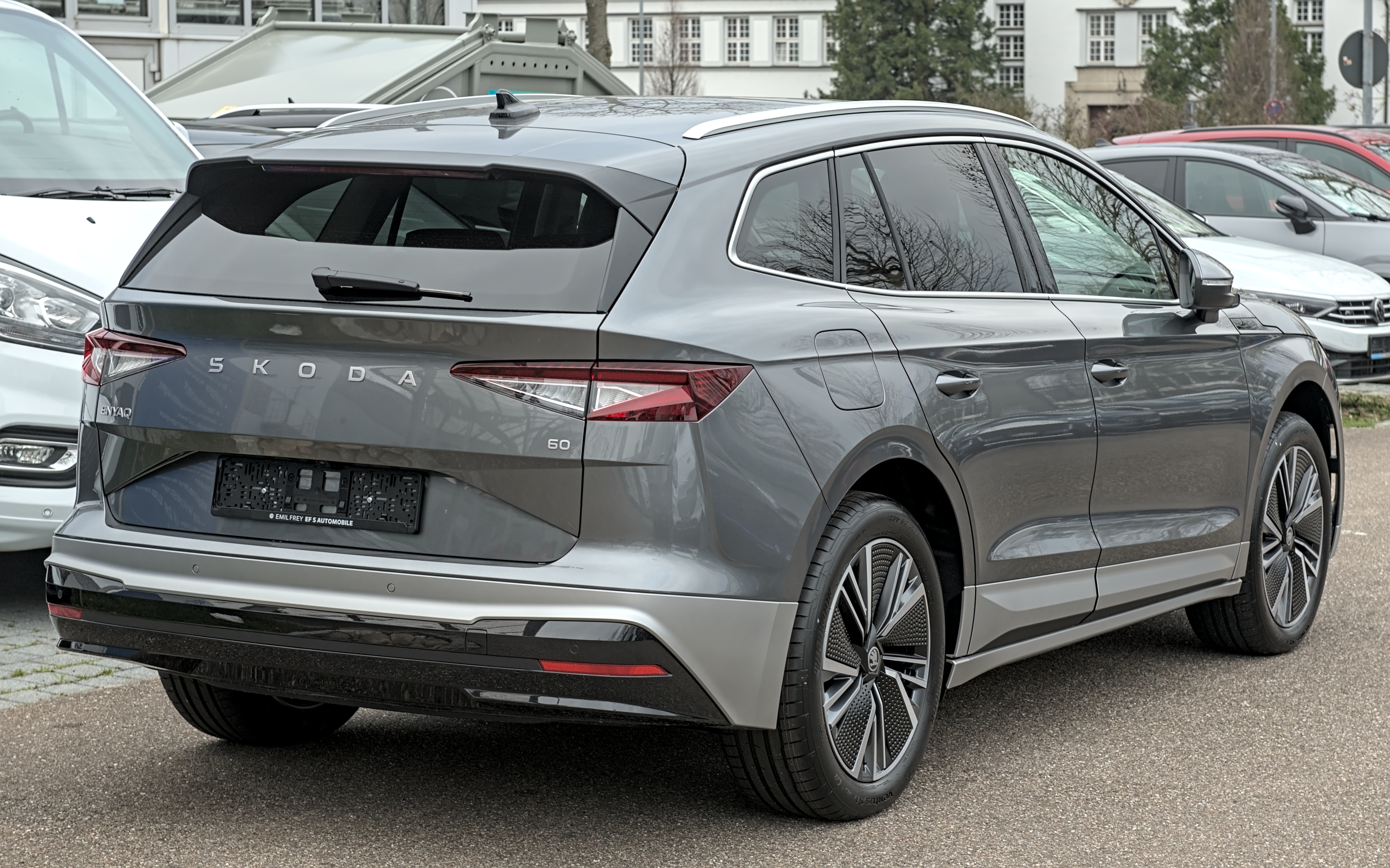
Rear view

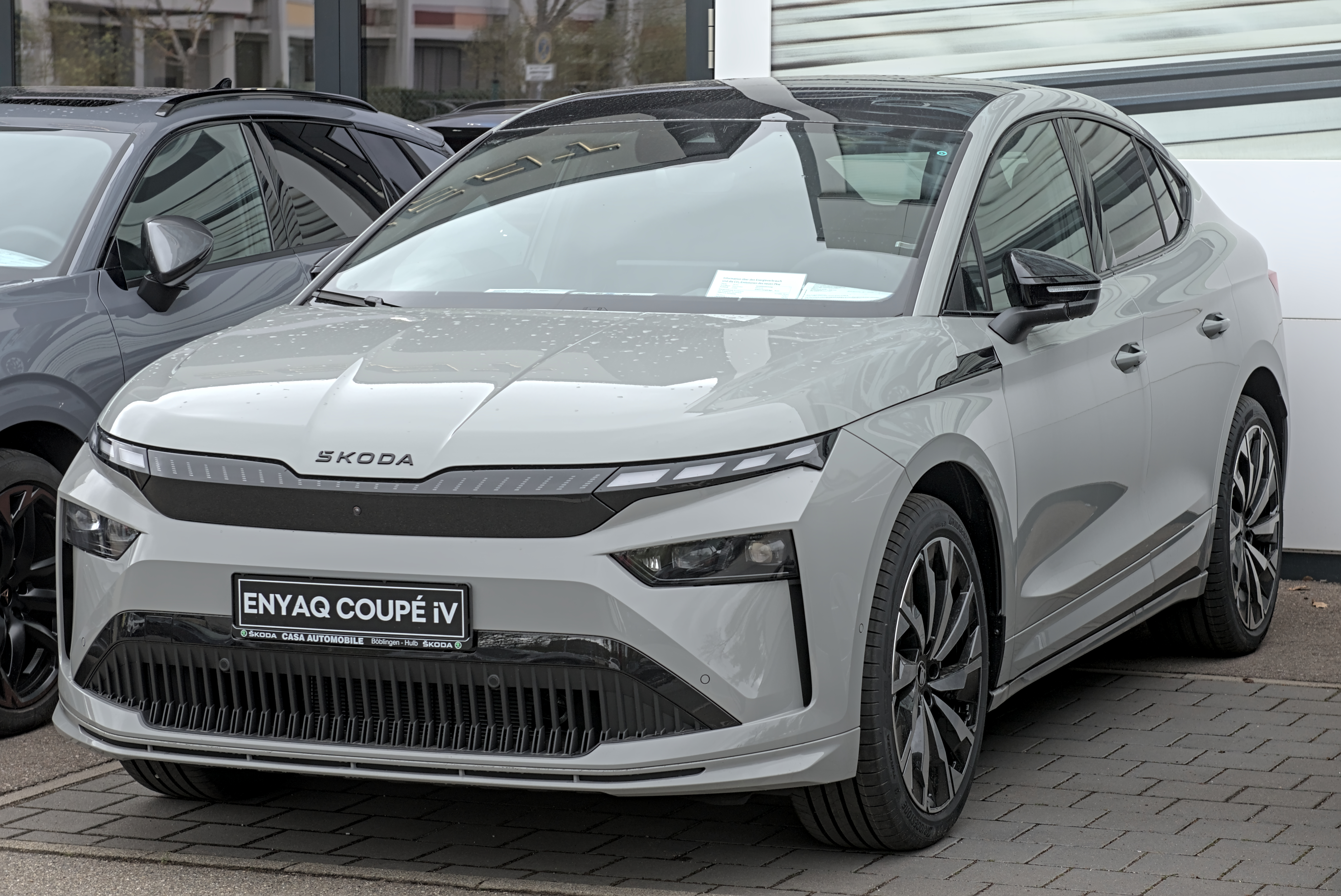
2025 Škoda Enyaq Coupe

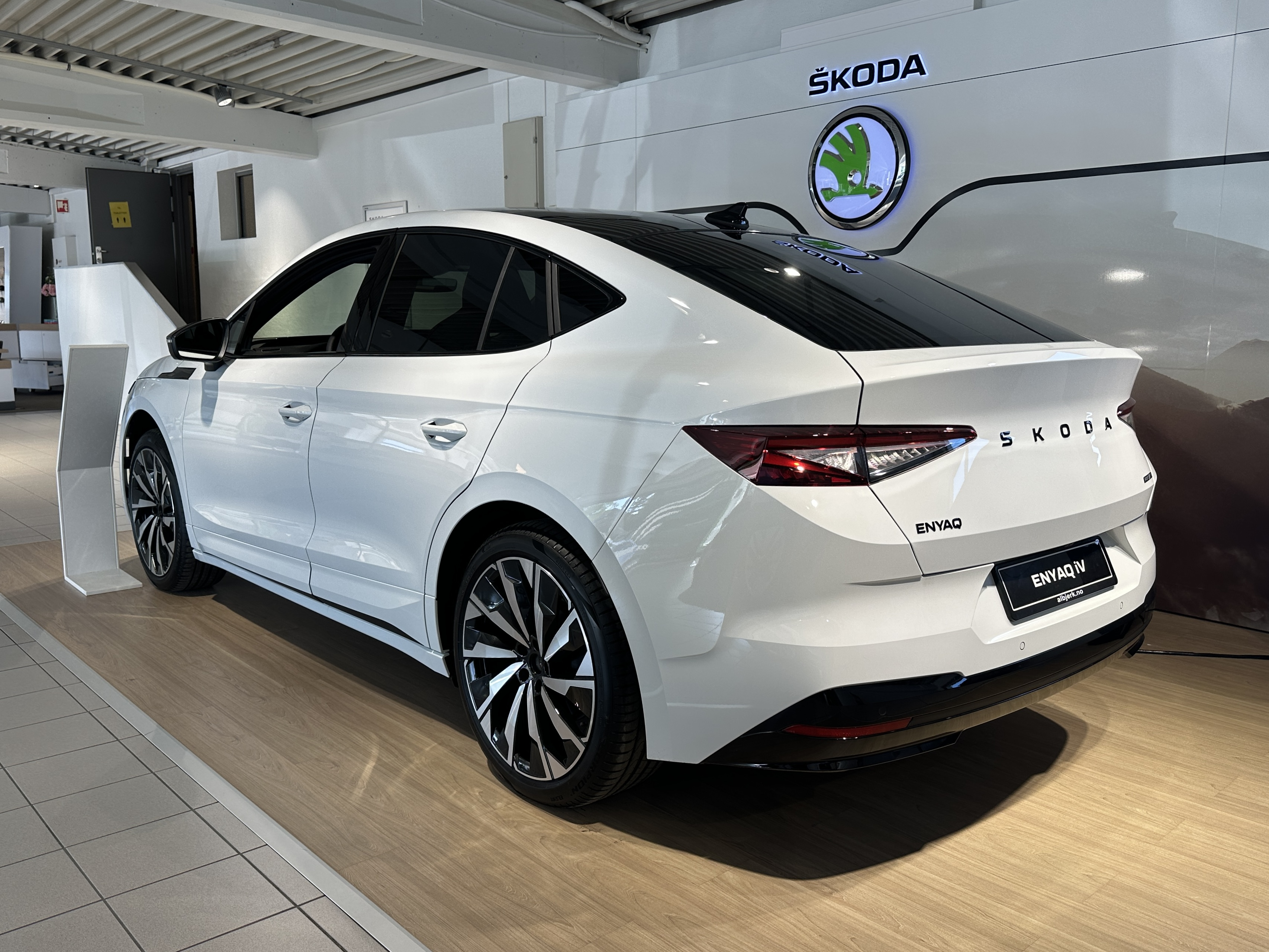
Rear view

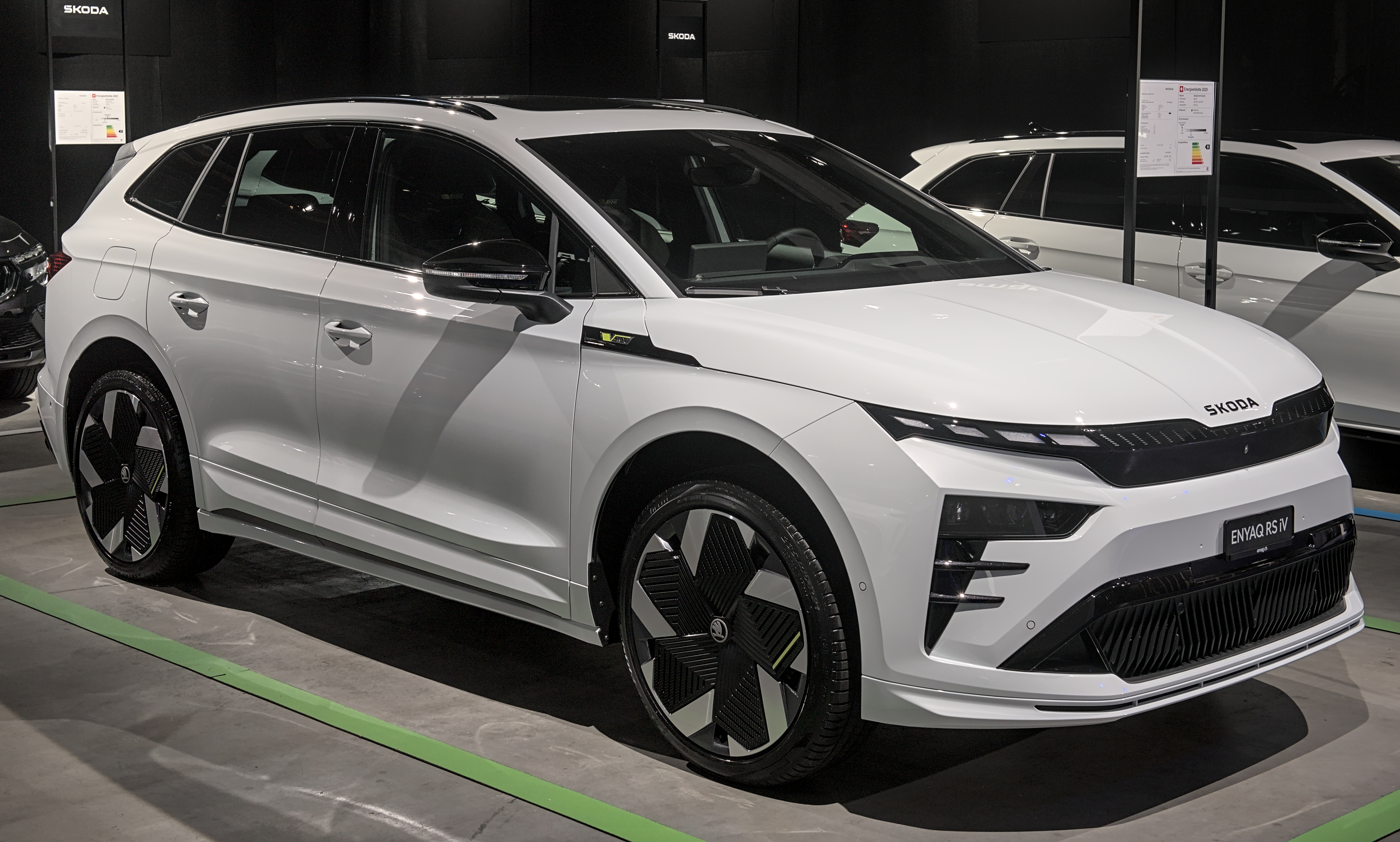
2025 Škoda Enyaq RS

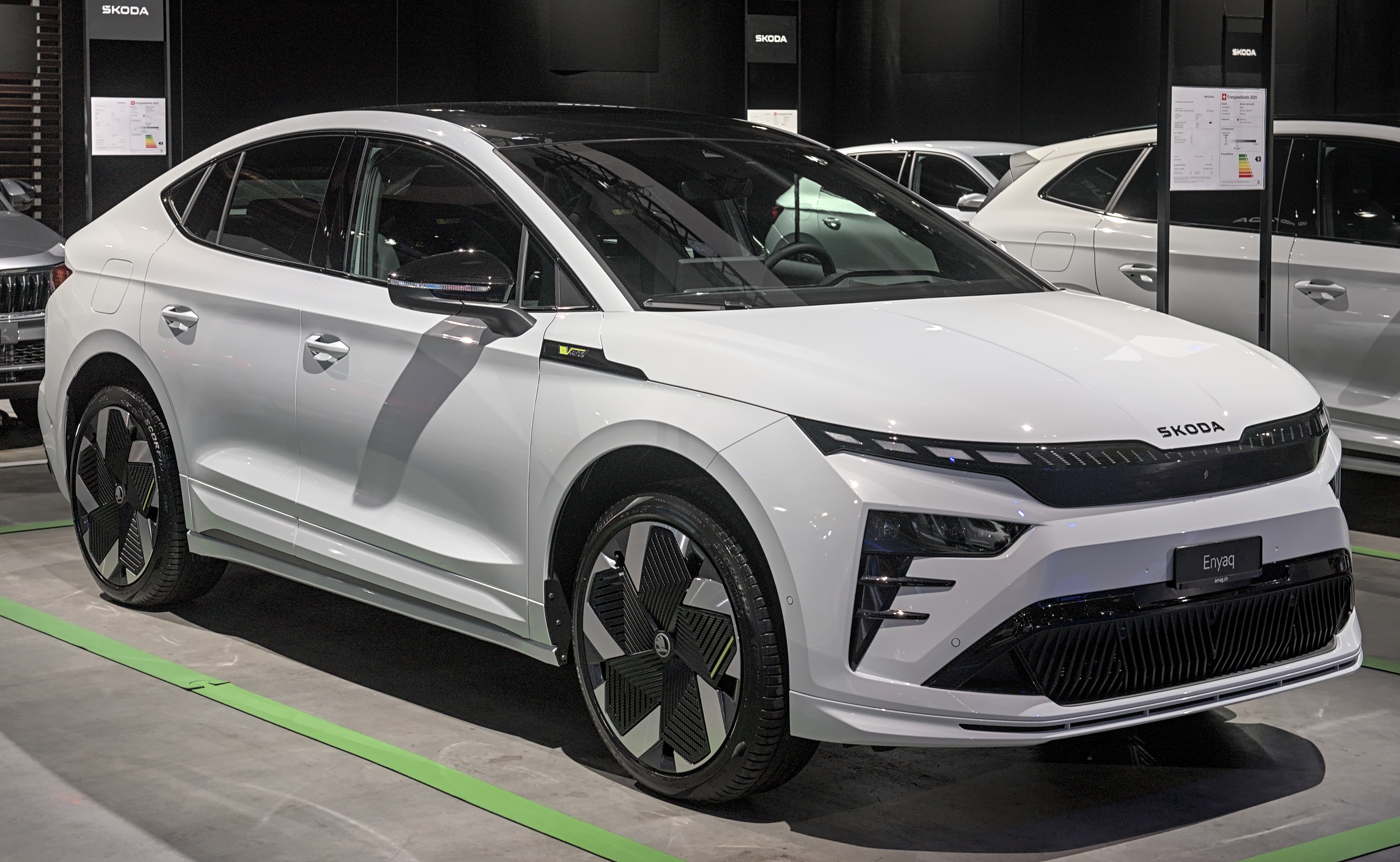
2025 Škoda Enyaq Coupe RS

=== Enyaq Cargo ===
In July 2025, Škoda launched a cargo variant of the Enyaq called the Enyaq Cargo for the UK market. It is based on the existing Enyaq 85 and 85x passenger models, with conversions costing £1,815 including VAT. It eliminates the rear passenger seats in favour of a new cargo area. Unlike most other panel vans, the Enyaq Cargo has a rear window.

== Specifications ==
Enyaq before the 2025 facelift
Variant	Drive	Power (kW)	Battery (kWh)	0–100 km/h (s)	WLTP range (km)	Peak DC (kW)
50	RWD	109	55 / 52	11.4	340	50 (optional 100)
60	RWD	132	62 / 58	8.7	390	120
80	RWD	150	82 / 77	8.5	510	125
80x	AWD	195	82 / 77	6.9	497	125
RS (2022)	AWD	220	82 / 77	6.5	517	135
85	RWD	210	82 / 77	6.7	563	135
85x	AWD	210	82 / 77	6.6	536	175
RS (2024)	AWD	250	82 / 77	5.5	537	175

Enyaq at the 2025 facelift launch
Variant	Drive	Power (kW)	Battery (kWh)	0–100 km/h (s)	WLTP range (km)	Peak DC (kW)
60	RWD	150	63 / 59	8.1	434	165
85	RWD	210	82 / 77	6.7	581	135
85x	AWD	210	82 / 77	6.7	544	175
RS	AWD	250	84 / 79	5.4	562	185

Enyaq from mid-2026 (2027 model)
Variant	Drive	Power (kW)	Battery (kWh)	0–100 km/h (s)	WLTP range (km)	Peak DC (kW)
60	RWD	140	61 / 58	8.6	457	105
85	RWD	210	82 / 77	6.6	584	165
85x	AWD	220	82 / 77	6.3	584	165
RS	AWD	250	82 / 77	5.4	569	165

== Concepts ==
The Vision E, an electric SUV concept, made its debut at Auto Shanghai in April 2017. It gave an early indication of Škoda's plans for a battery-electric SUV.

Škoda presented the Vision iV at the Geneva Motor Show in March 2019. The concept had a sloping roofline and used the Volkswagen Group's MEB platform. It had one electric motor on each axle, giving it all-wheel drive and an output of 225 kW. The Vision iV previewed the Enyaq iV, which became Škoda's first production model on the MEB platform.

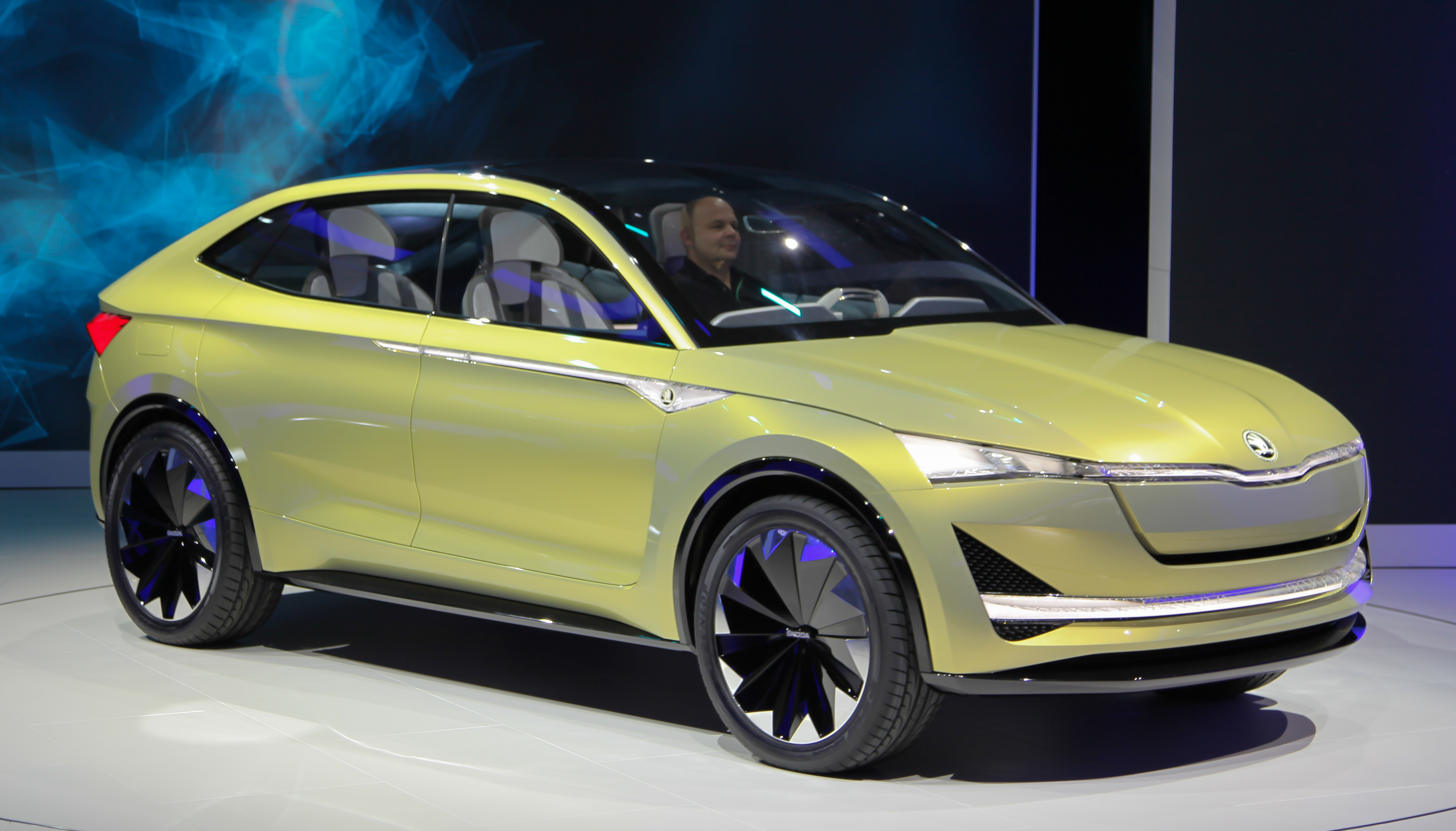
Škoda Vision E (2017)

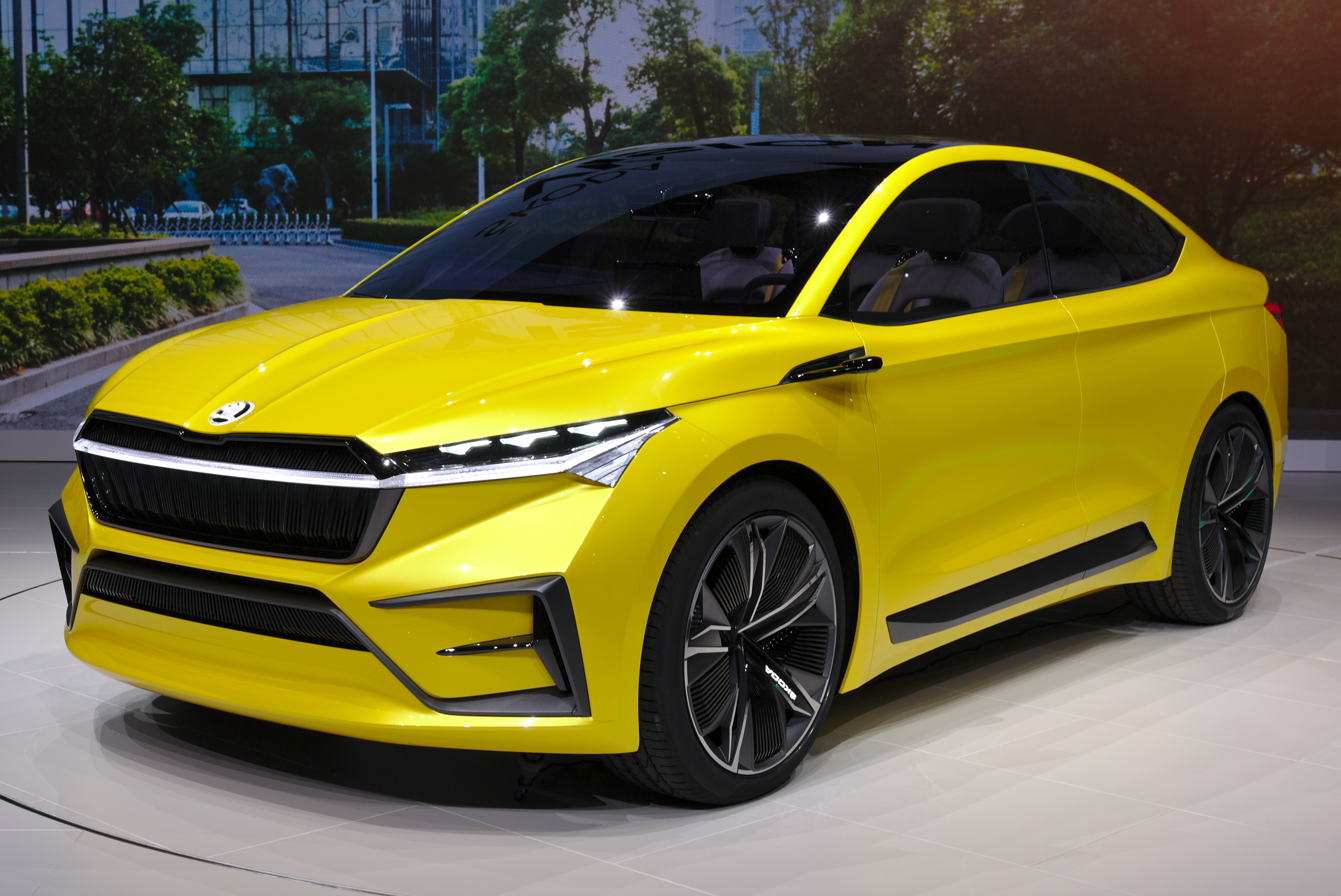
Škoda Vision iV (2019)

== Safety ==
=== Driver assistance ===
The Enyaq offers Travel Assist, which combines adaptive cruise control, adaptive lane guidance and assistance in traffic jams. Assisted motorway lane changes are available with the appropriate equipment.

Travel Assist 3.0 was added in 2026, with updated sensors and revised assistance for motorway lane changes. Emergency Assist can manoeuvre the vehicle to the motorway hard shoulder if the driver fails to respond. A new interior camera monitors driver attention and fatigue through eye tracking. The update also added corner radars to improve detection of crossing traffic at junctions.

=== Safety ratings ===
Assessment	Overall	Adult occupant	Child occupant	Vulnerable road users	Safety assist
ANCAP (2021)	5/5 stars	94%	89%	71%	73%
Euro NCAP (2021)	5/5 stars	94%	89%	71%	82%
Euro NCAP (2025)	5/5 stars	90%	87%	77%	78%
