= Volkswagen Group MQB platform =

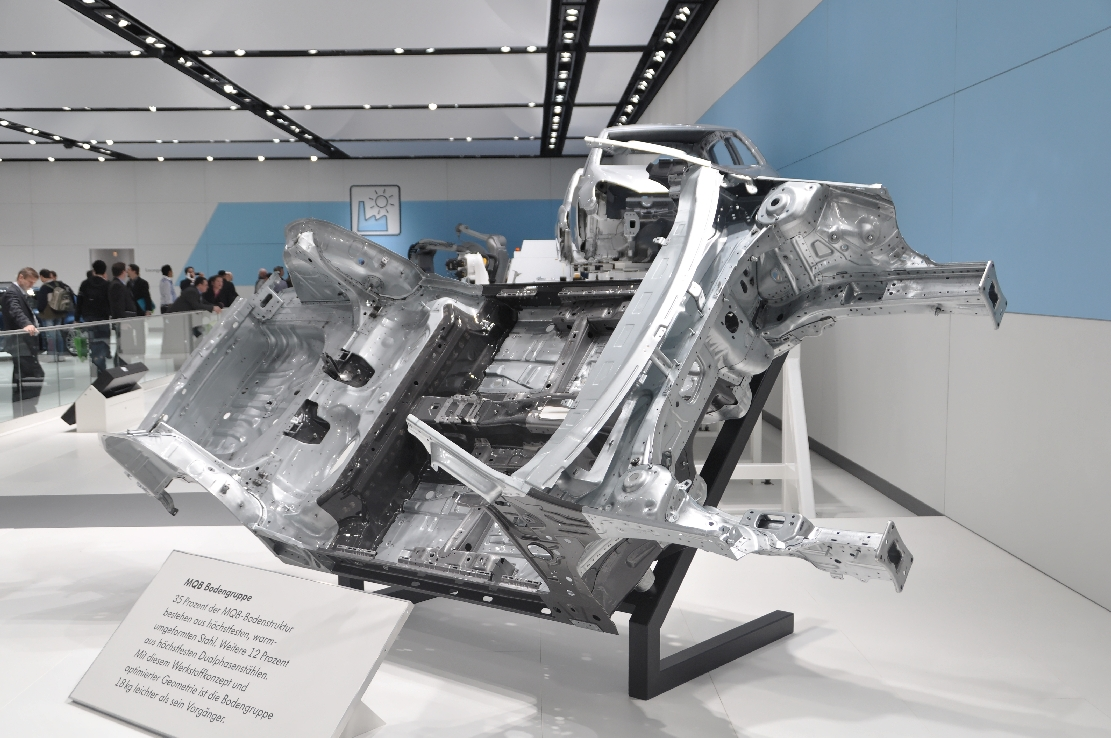
- "MQB Bodengruppe"; Volkswagen MQB floor assembly on display at the 2012 Hannover Messe.

Overview
- Manufacturer: Volkswagen Group
- Production: 2012–present

Body and chassis
- Layout: Transverse front-engine, front-wheel-drive; Transverse front-engine, all-wheel-drive
- Related: MEB platform MLB platform

Chronology
- Predecessor: PQ25 platform PQ35 platform PQ46 platform

The Volkswagen Group MQB platform is the company's strategy for shared modular design construction of its transverse, front-engine, front-wheel-drive layout (optional front-engine, four-wheel-drive layout) automobiles. It was first introduced in the Volkswagen Golf Mk7 in late 2012. Volkswagen spent roughly $8bn developing this new platform and the cars employing it. The platform underpins a wide range of cars from the supermini class to the mid size SUV class. MQB allows Volkswagen to assemble any of its cars based on this platform across all of its MQB ready factories. This allows the Volkswagen group flexibility to shift production as needed between its different factories. Beginning in 2012, Volkswagen Group marketed the strategy under the code name MQB, which stands for Modularer Querbaukasten, translating from German to "Modular Transversal Toolkit" or "Modular Transverse Matrix". MQB is one strategy within VW's overall MB (Modularer Baukasten or modular matrix) program which also includes the similar MLB strategy for vehicles with longitudinal engine orientation.

MQB is not a platform as such, but, rather, a system for introducing rationality to different platforms that have transverse engines, regardless of the ten body configurations the company manufactures for any of its eleven vehicle brands. Thus MQB coordinates a core "matrix" of components across a wide variety of platforms — for example, sharing a common engine-mounting core for all drivetrains (e.g., gasoline, diesel, natural gas, hybrid and purely electric), as well as reducing weight. The concept allows different models to be manufactured at the same plant, further saving cost.

Ulrich Hackenberg, chief of Volkswagen’s Research and Development (Head of Audi Development until 2015), called MQB a "strategic weapon."

== Press comments ==
British magazine Car said "the idea heralds a return to basic principles of mass production in an industry where over the last 100 years, complexity has spiralled out of control. By creating a standardised, interchangeable set of parts from which to build a variety of cars, (the company) plans to cut the time taken to build a car by 30%."

The car blog Jalopnik said "The biggest feature is the uniform position of all motors and transmissions" and that "by fitting all motors into the same place (the company) hope(s) to cut down on engineering costs and weight/complexity when porting the car over to other models." Around 60% of the development costs occur between gas pedal and front wheels, including the engine.

== MQB-based models ==
MQB models range from superminis to large family cars. The MQB architecture replaces the PQ25, PQ35 and PQ46 platforms.

All MQB cars share the same front axle, pedal box and engine positioning, despite varying wheelbase, track and external dimensions.

== First generation MQB (2012) ==
The "first-generation" MQB platform underpins various vehicles from C-segment upwards.

- Audi A3 Mk3 (2012–2020)
- Audi TT Mk3 (2014–2023)
- SEAT León Mk3 (2012–2020)
- Škoda Octavia Mk3 (2012–2020)
- Škoda Superb Mk3 (B8) (2015–2024)
- Volkswagen Arteon/CC (2017–present)
- Volkswagen Atlas/Teramont (2017–present)
  - Atlas Cross Sport / Teramont X (2019–present)
- Volkswagen Golf Mk7 (2012–2020)
- Volkswagen Golf Sportsvan (2014–2020)
- Volkswagen Lamando (2014–2022)
- Volkswagen Passat/Magotan (B8) (2014–2024)
- Volkswagen Passat (China) (2018–present)
- Volkswagen Touran Mk2 (2015–2026)
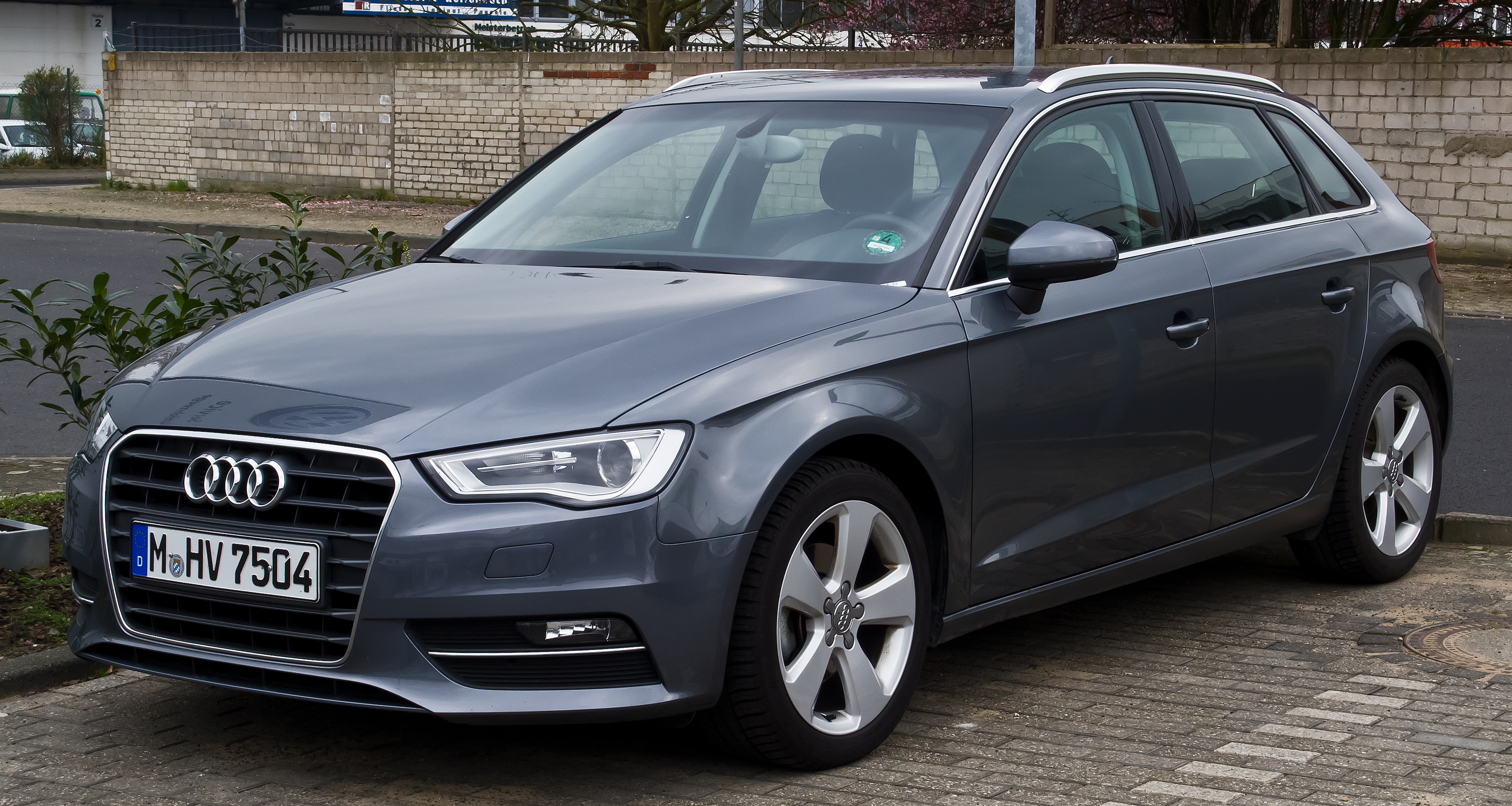
Audi A3

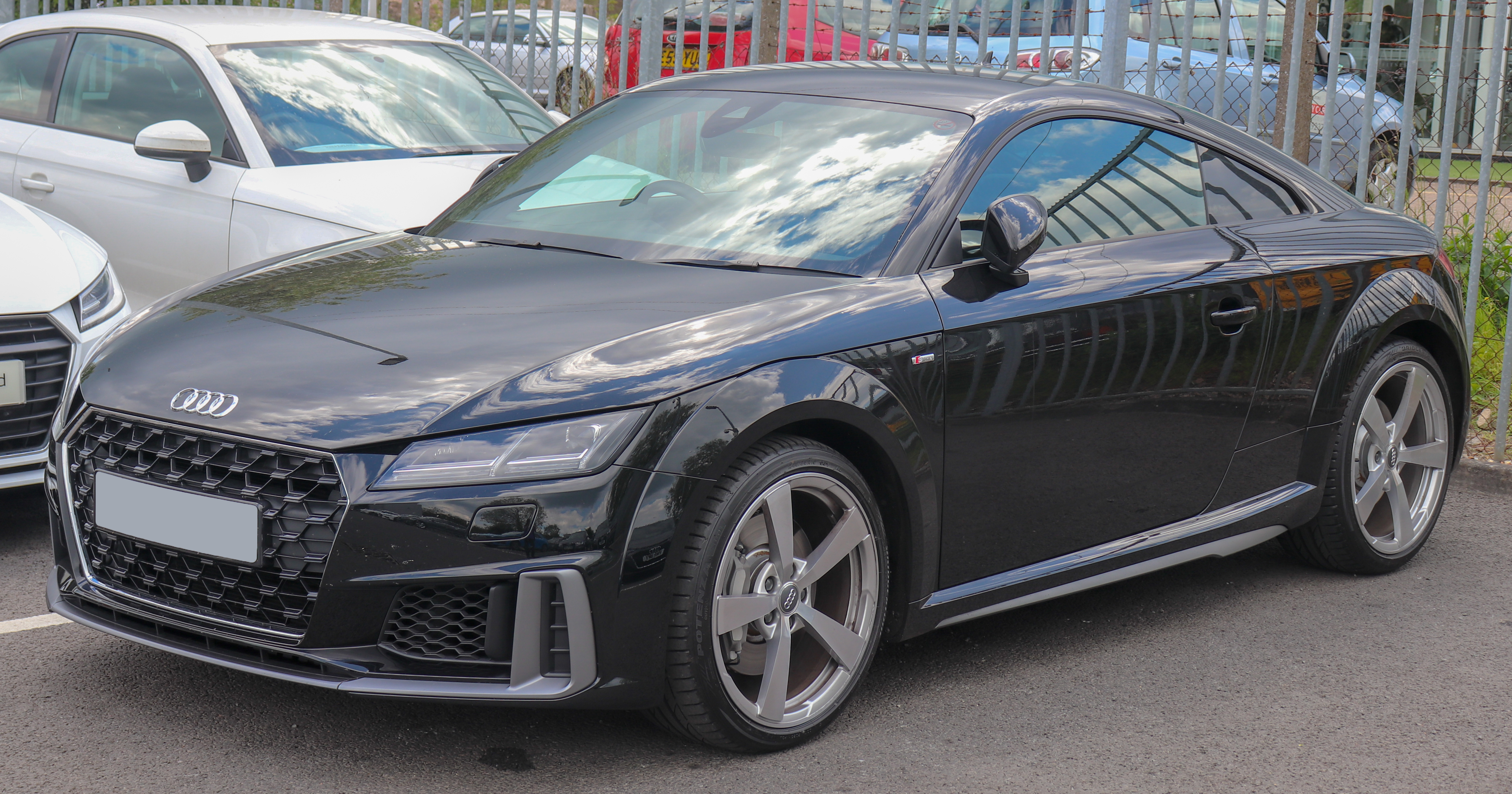
Audi TT

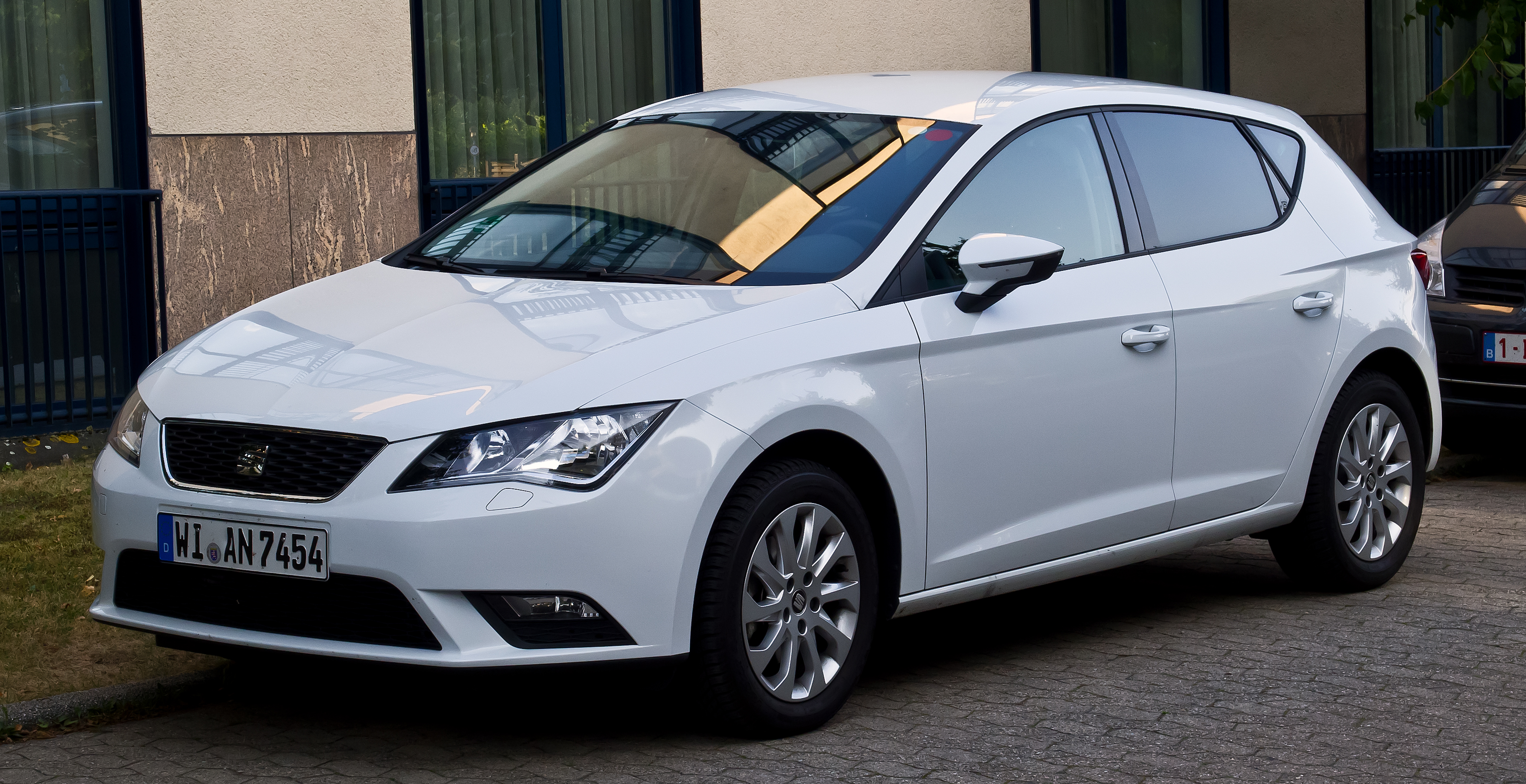
SEAT León

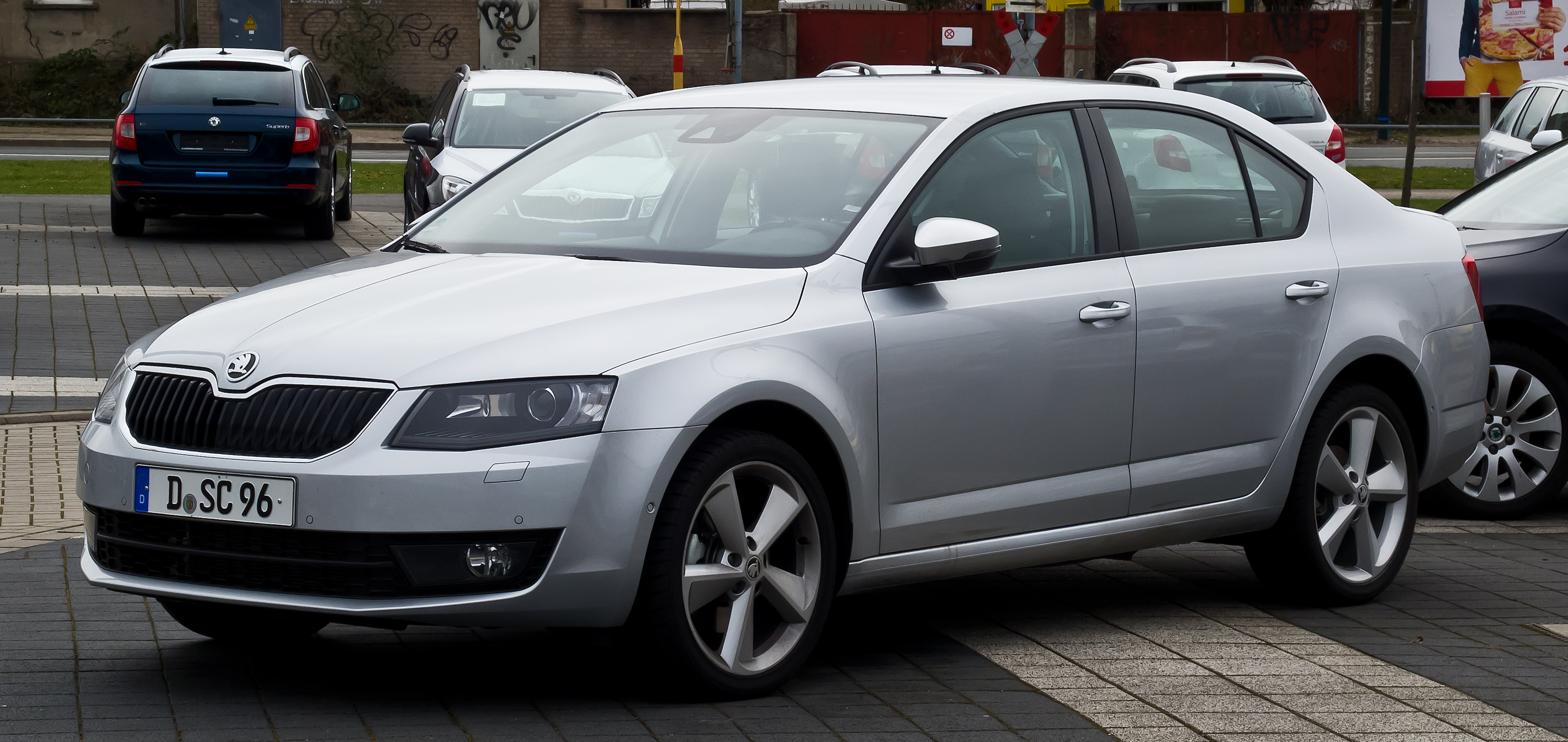
Škoda Octavia

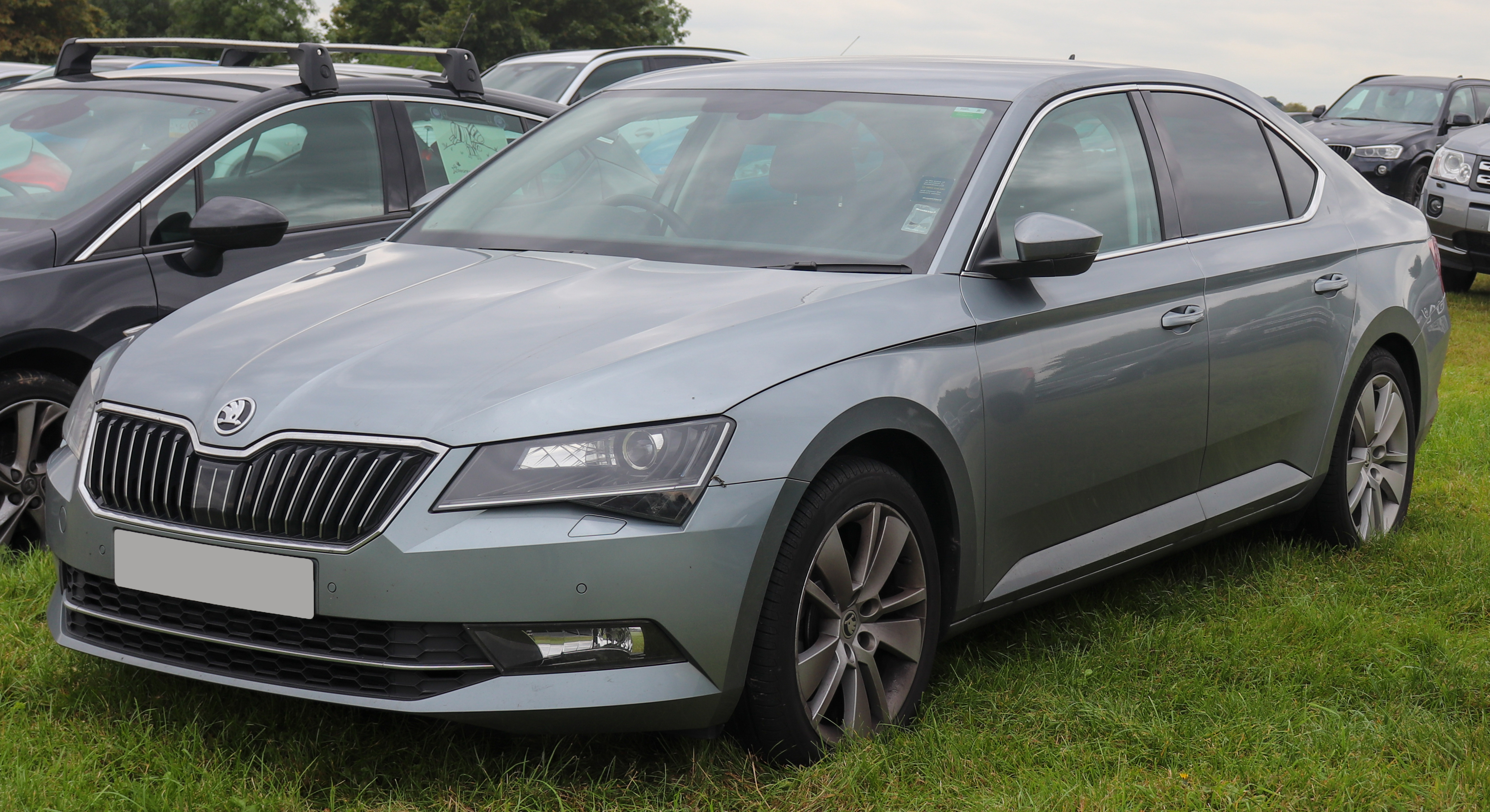
Škoda Superb

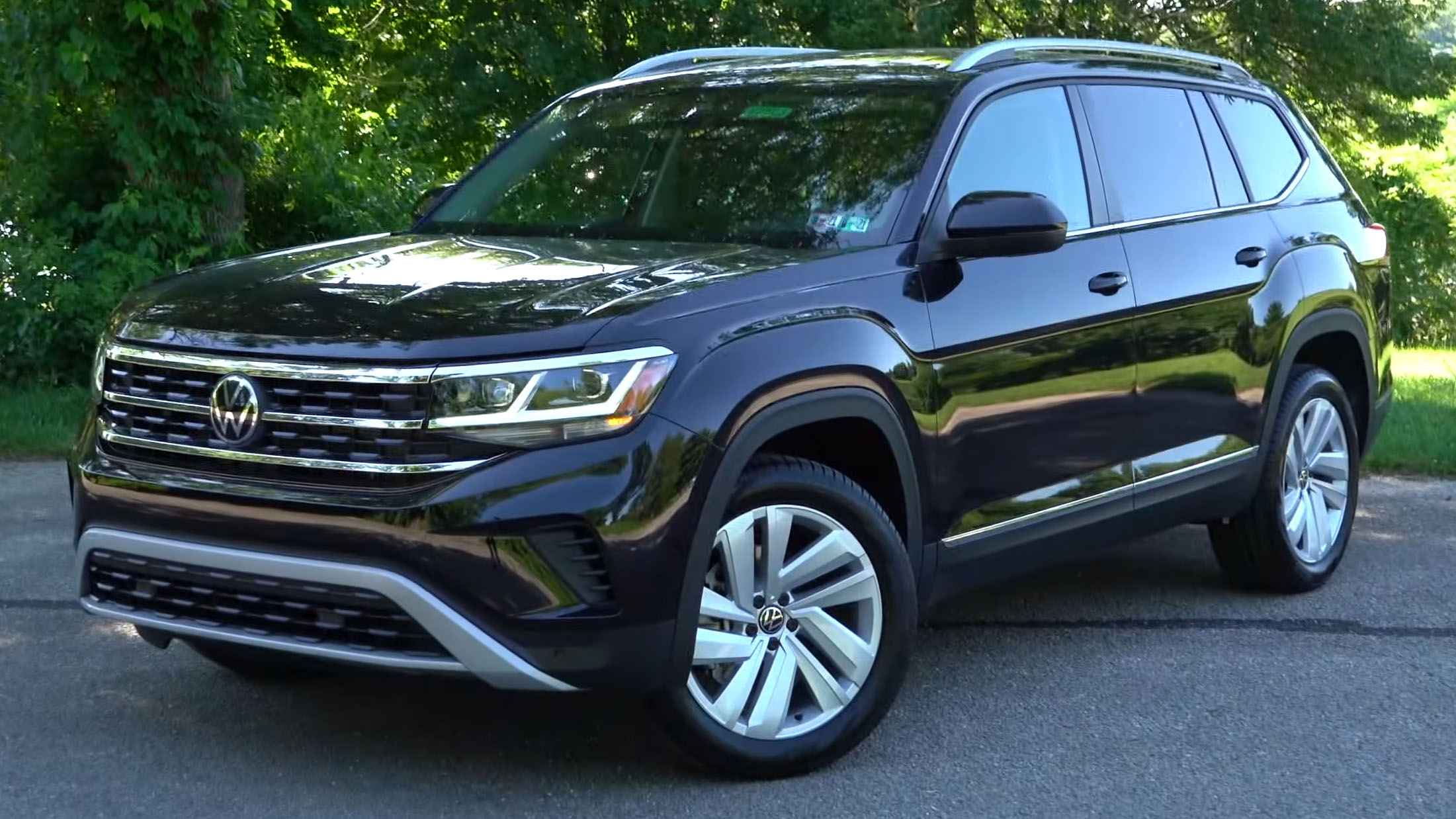
Volkswagen Atlas

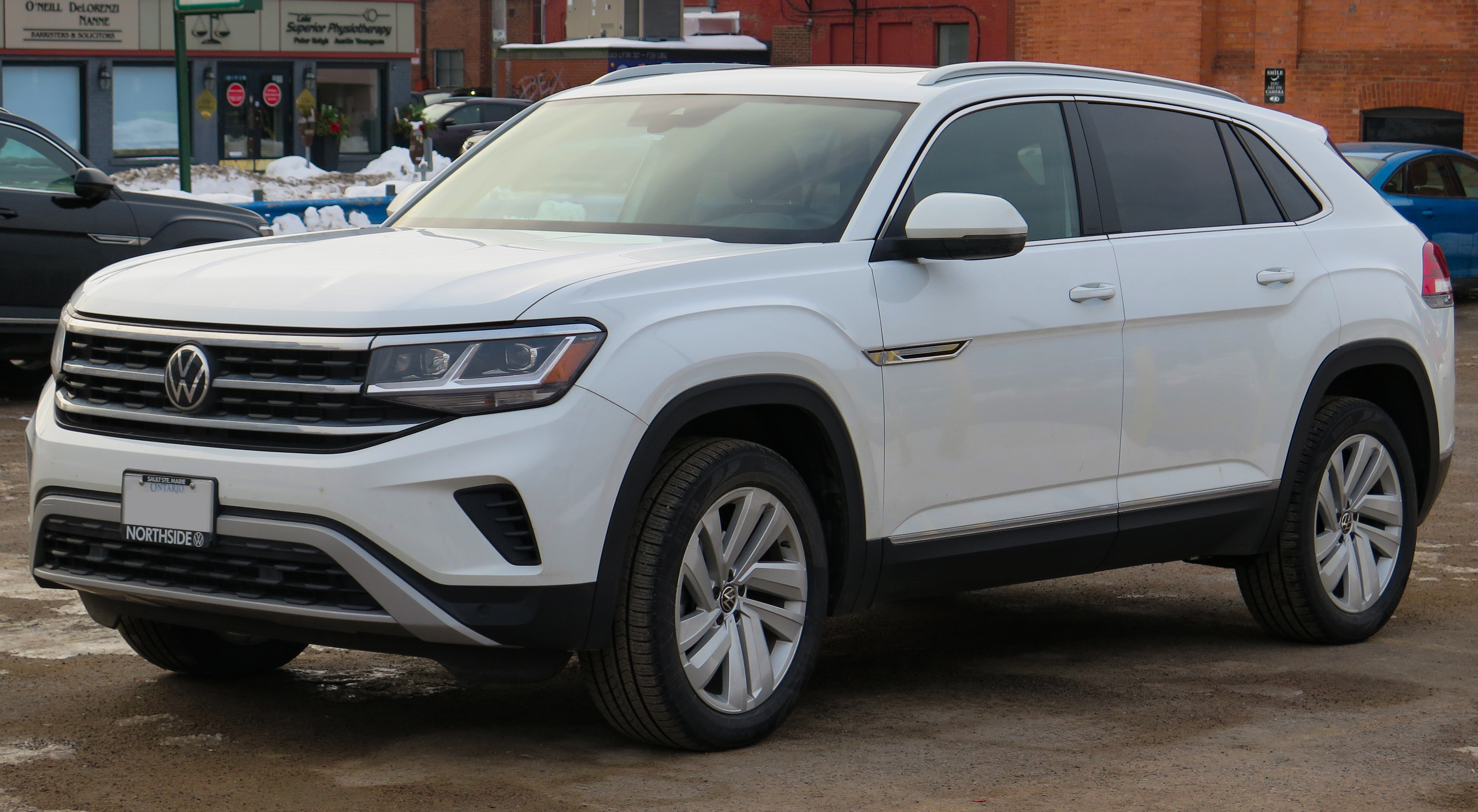
Volkswagen Atlas Cross Sport

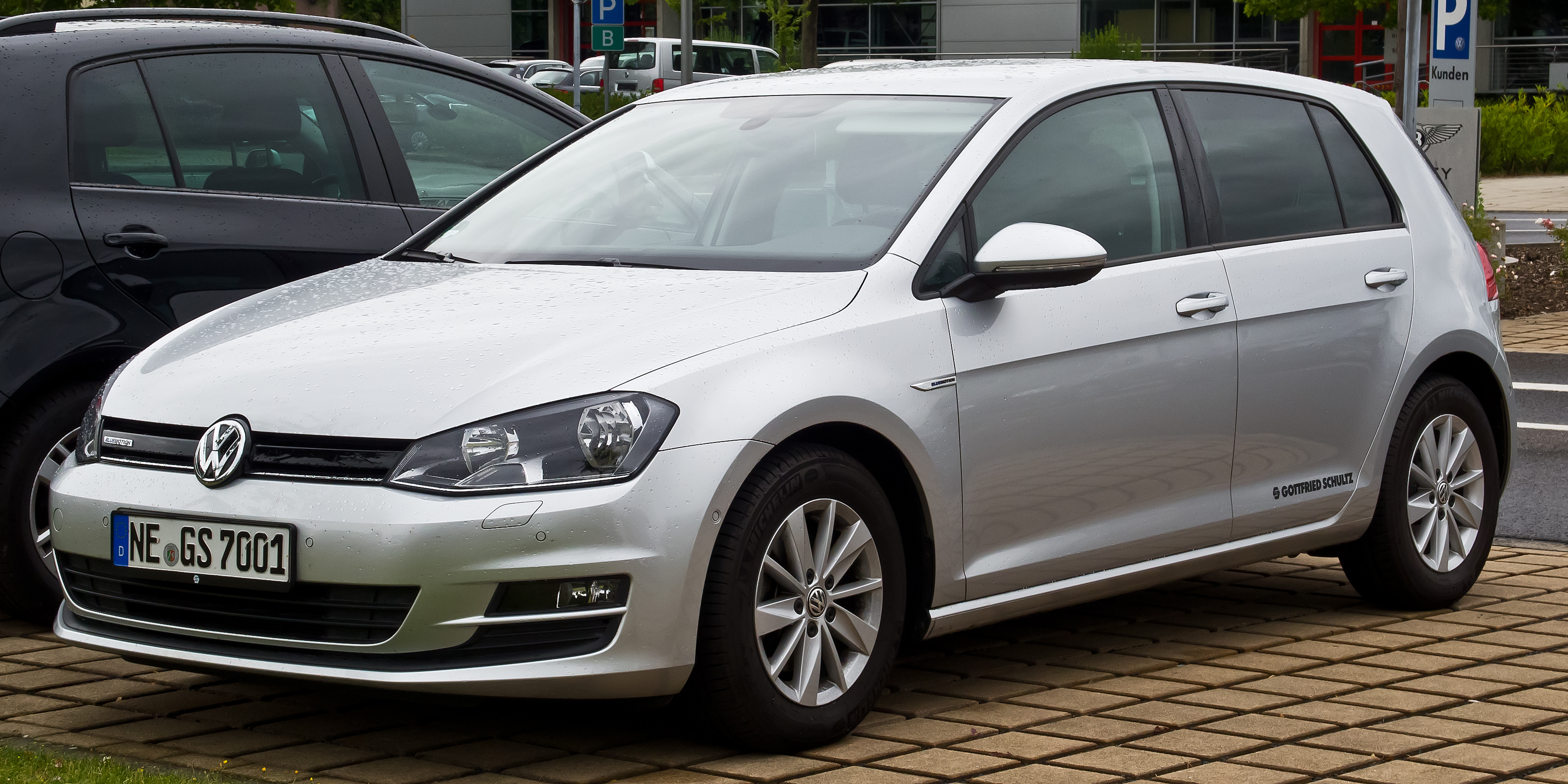
Volkswagen Golf

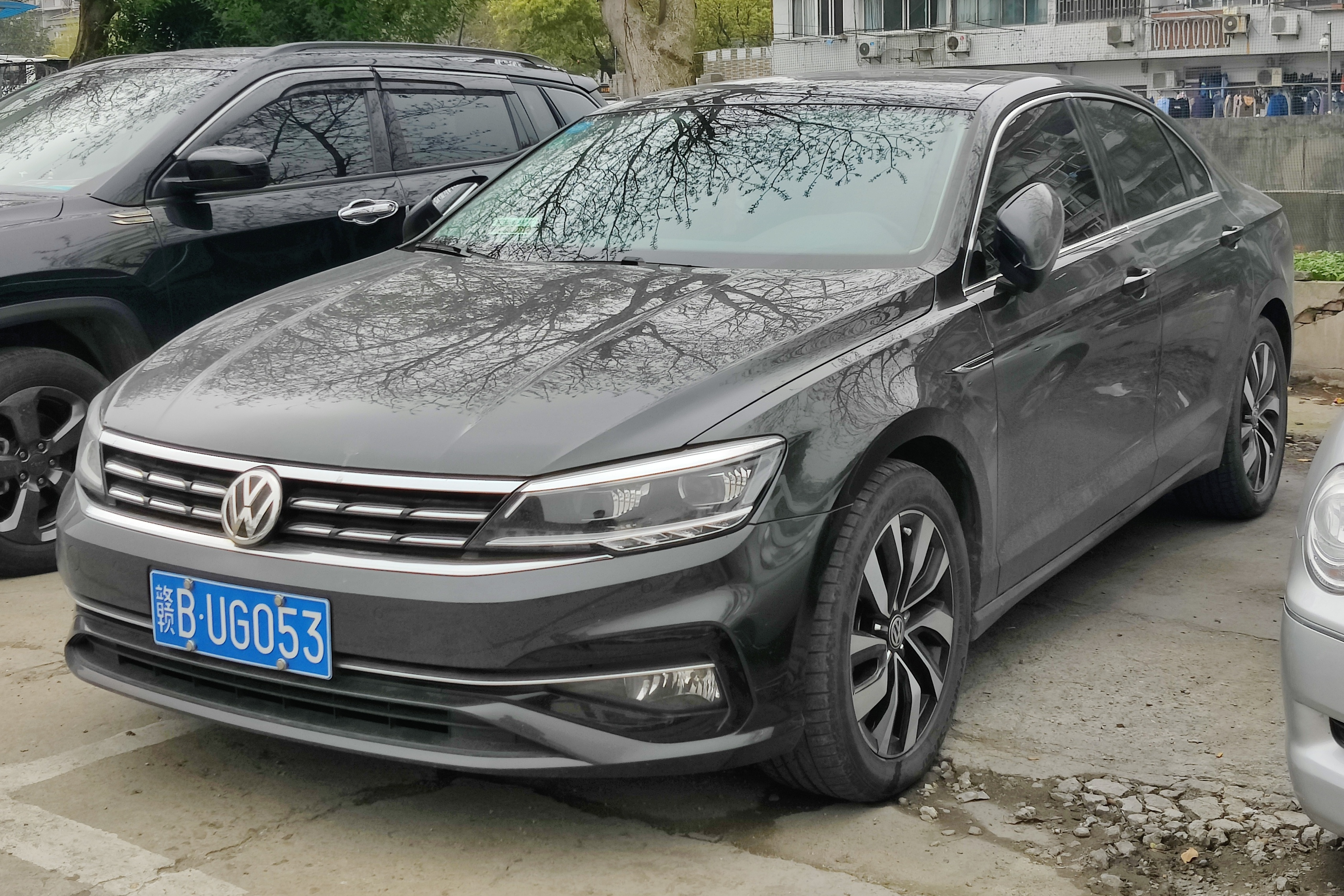
Volkswagen Lamando

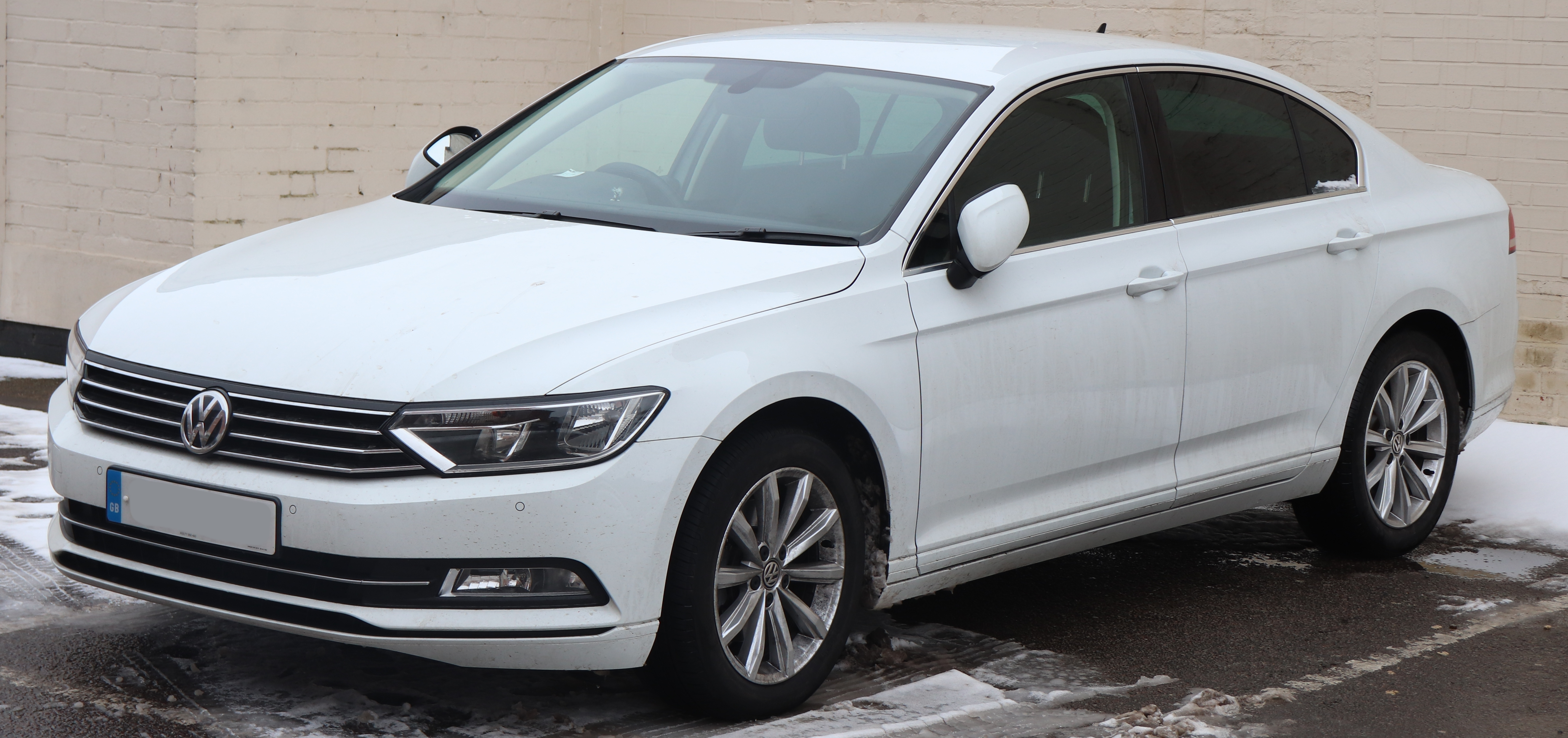
Volkswagen Passat

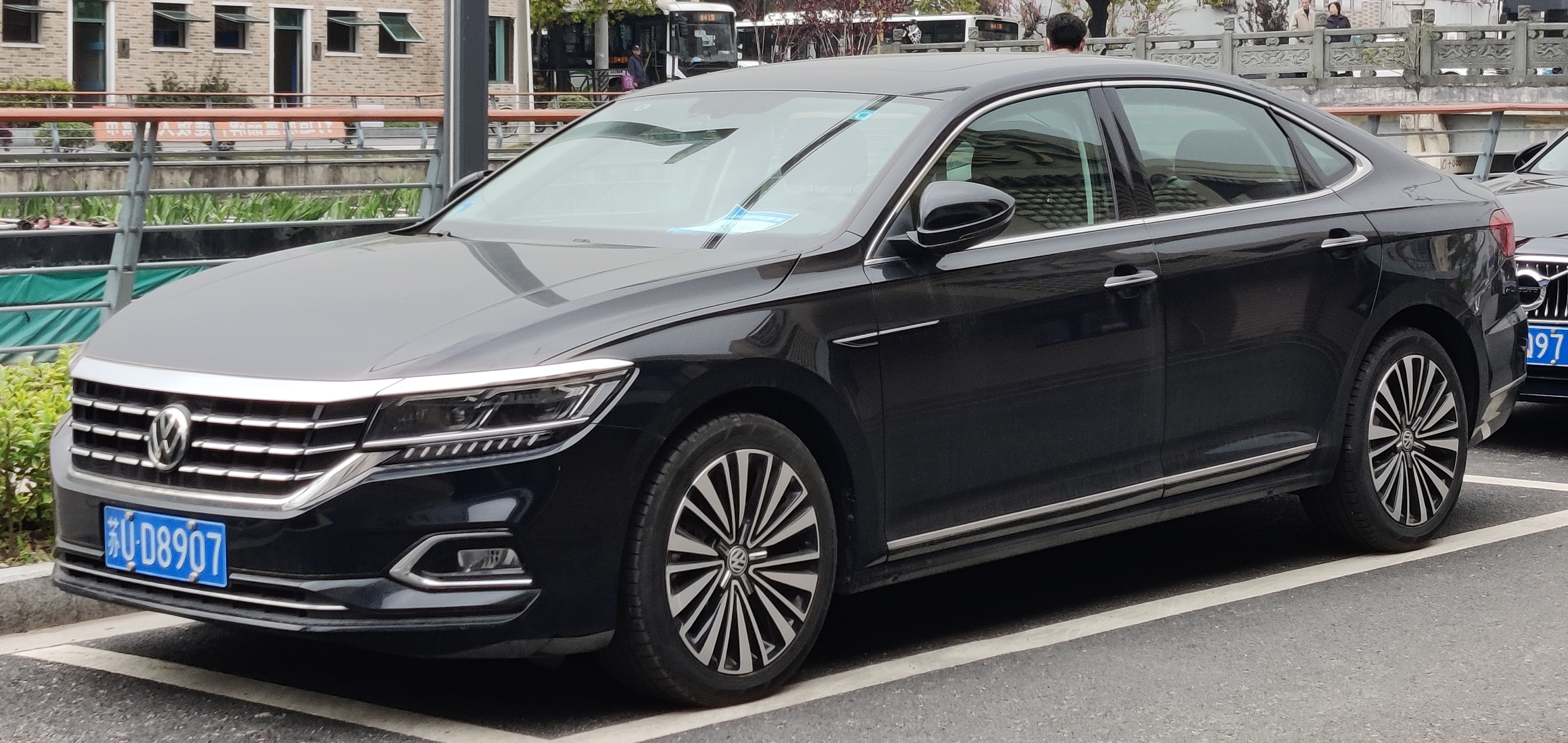
Volkswagen Passat (China only)

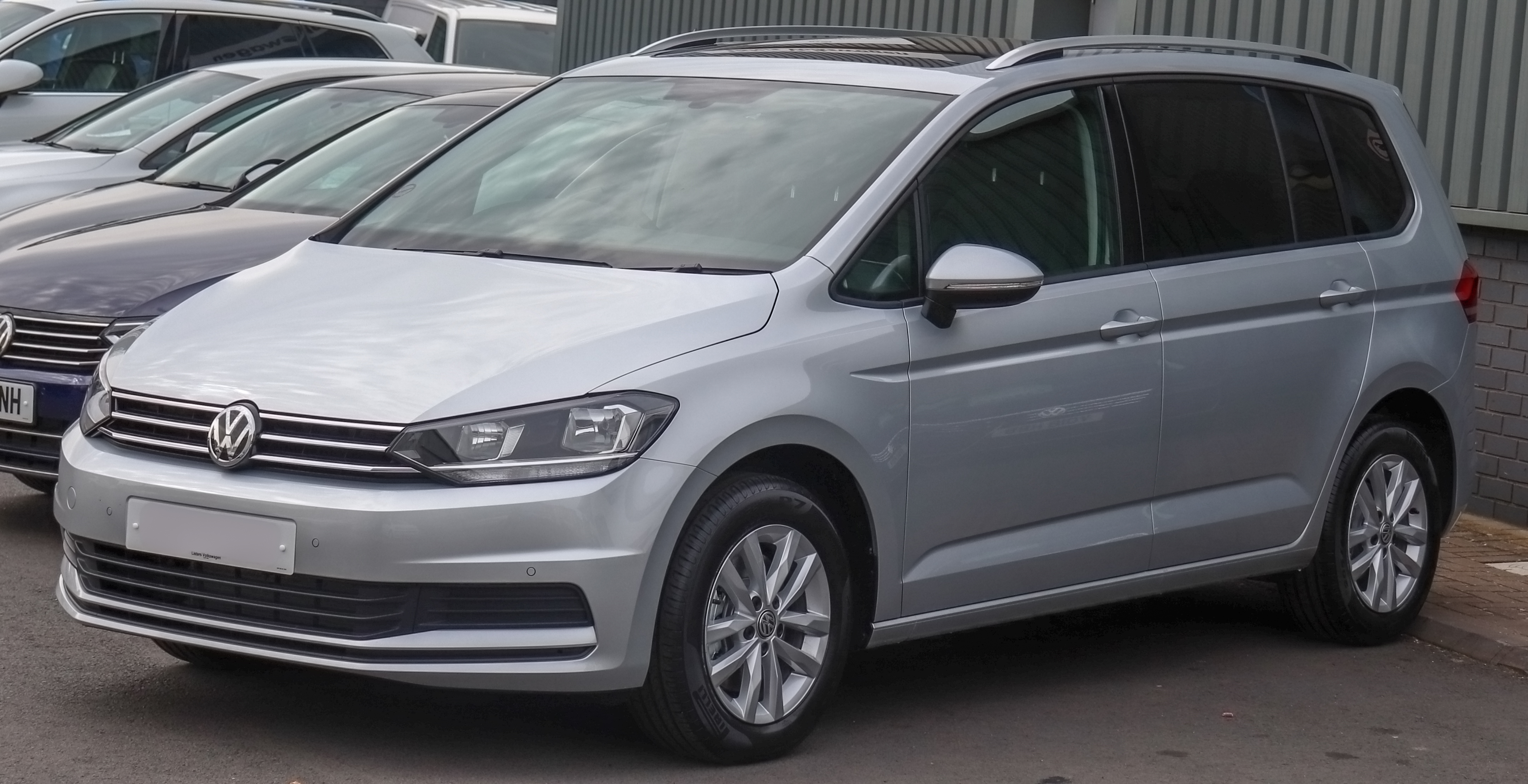
Volkswagen Touran

== Second generation MQB (MQB Ax; 2016) ==
The "second-generation" MQB debuted in 2016, which also introduces three different types of the platform grouped by size/segment. The introduction of the MQB A0 category enables the platform to be used on smaller and cheaper vehicles in the B-segment.

=== MQB A0 ===
- Audi A1 Mk2 (2018–2026)
- SEAT Arona (2017–present)
- SEAT Ibiza Mk5 (2017–present)
- Škoda Kamiq (global) (2019–present)
- Škoda Scala (2019–present)
- Škoda Fabia Mk4 (2021–present)
- Škoda Slavia (2021–present)
- Volkswagen Nivus/Taigo (2020–present)
- Volkswagen Polo Mk6 (2017–present)
- Volkswagen T-Cross/Tacqua (2019–present)
- Volkswagen Tera (2025–present)
- Volkswagen Tukan (2026–present)
- Volkswagen Virtus / Lavida XR (2018–present)
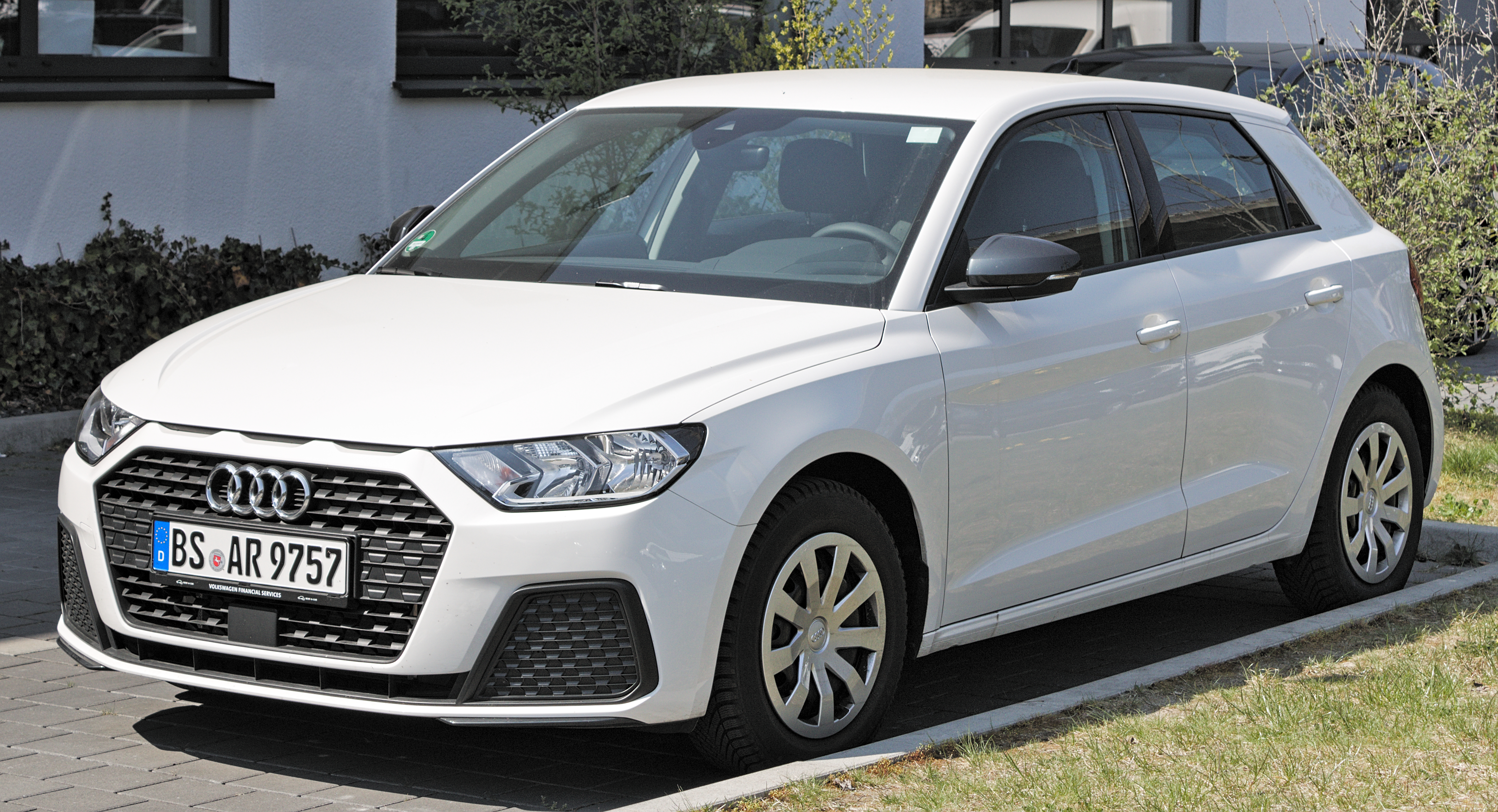
Audi A1

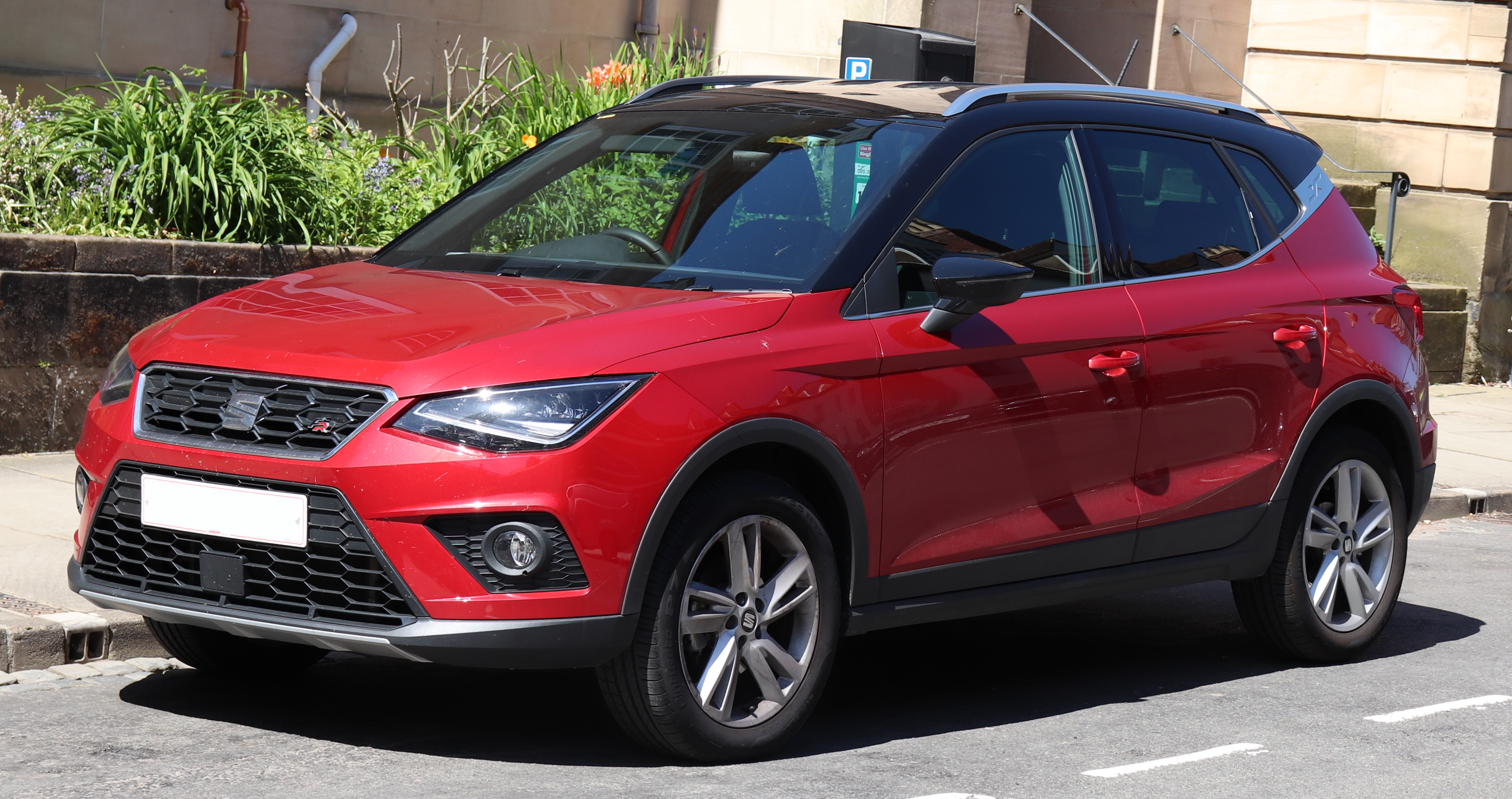
SEAT Arona

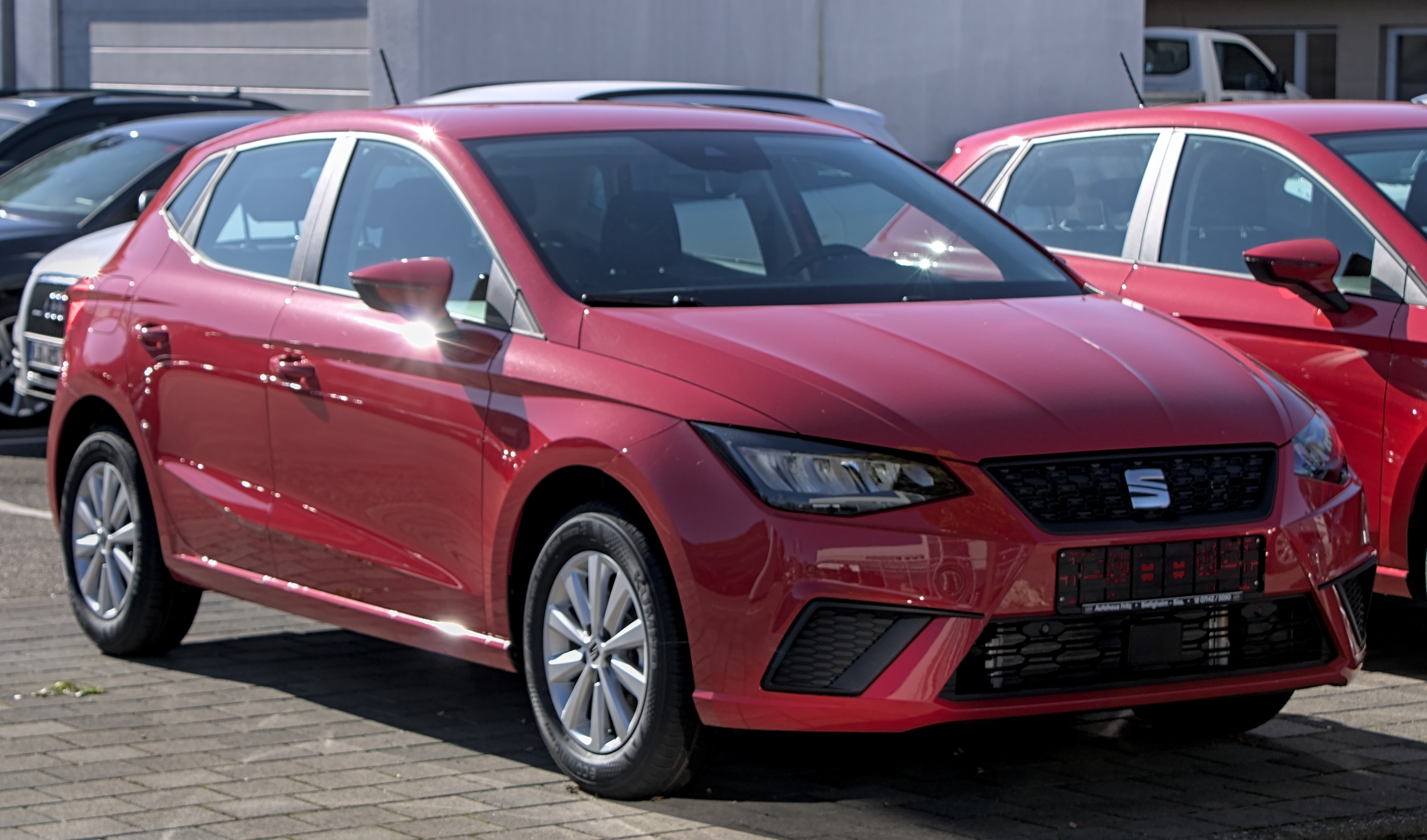
SEAT Ibiza

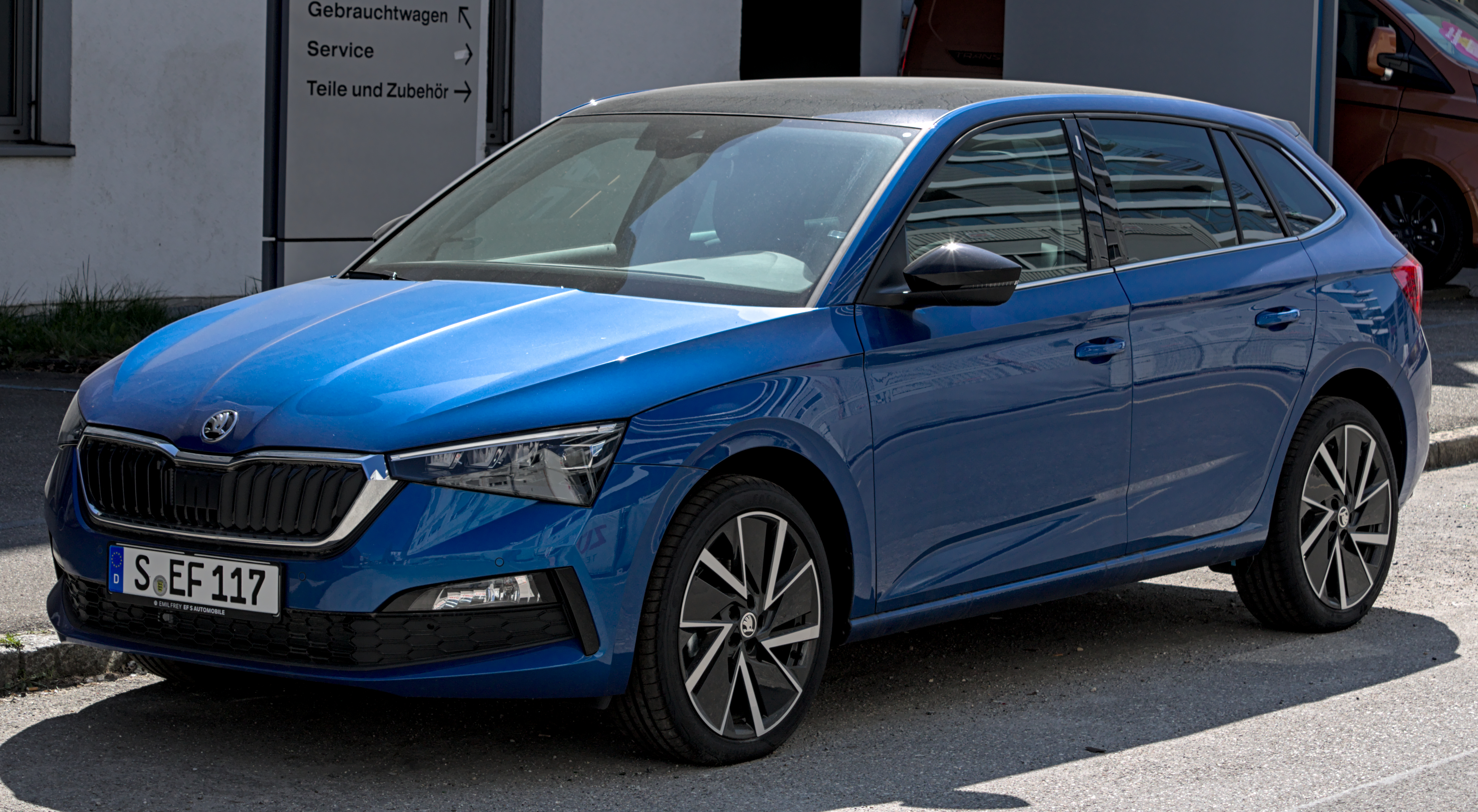
Škoda Scala

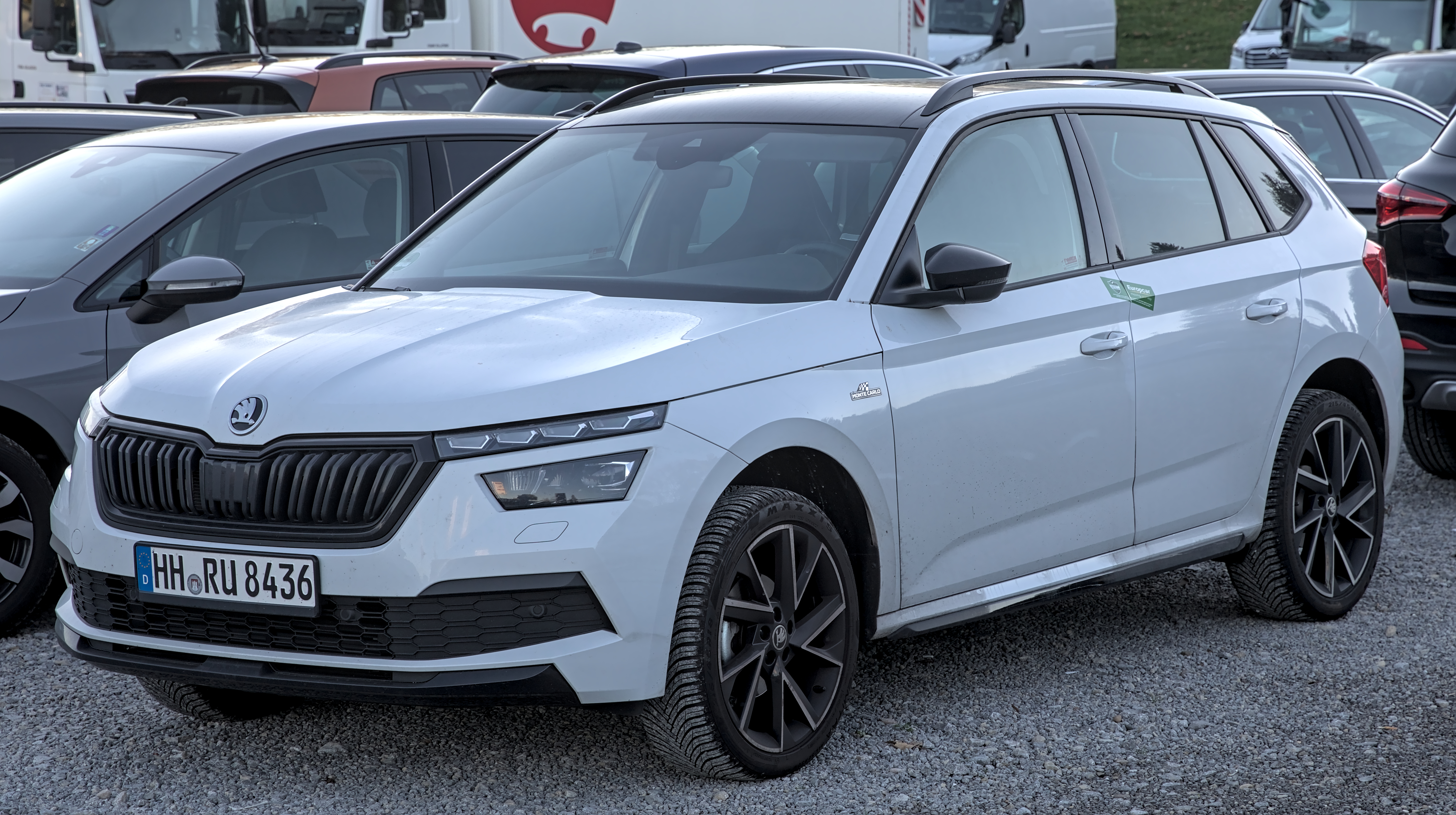
Škoda Kamiq

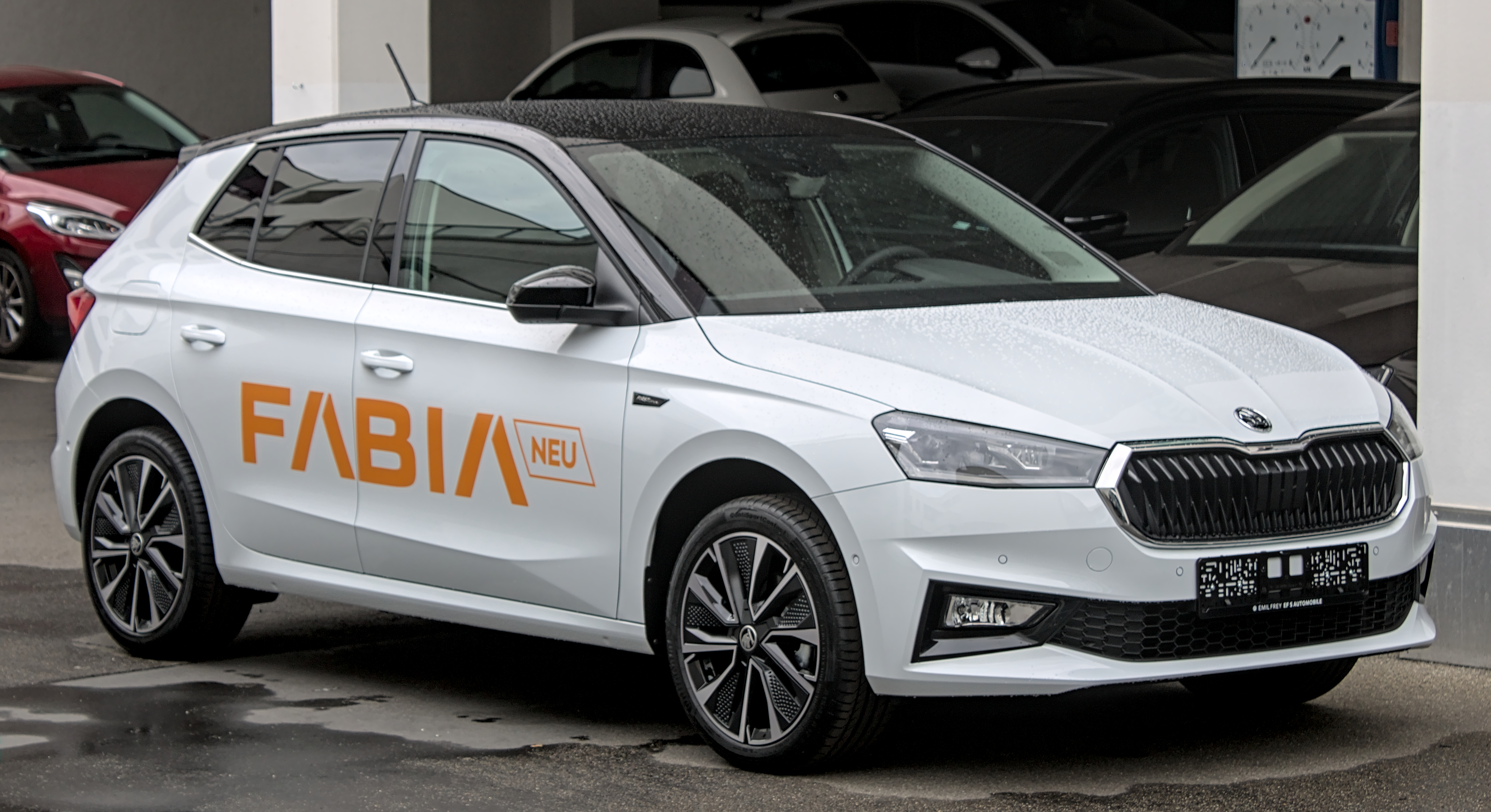
Škoda Fabia

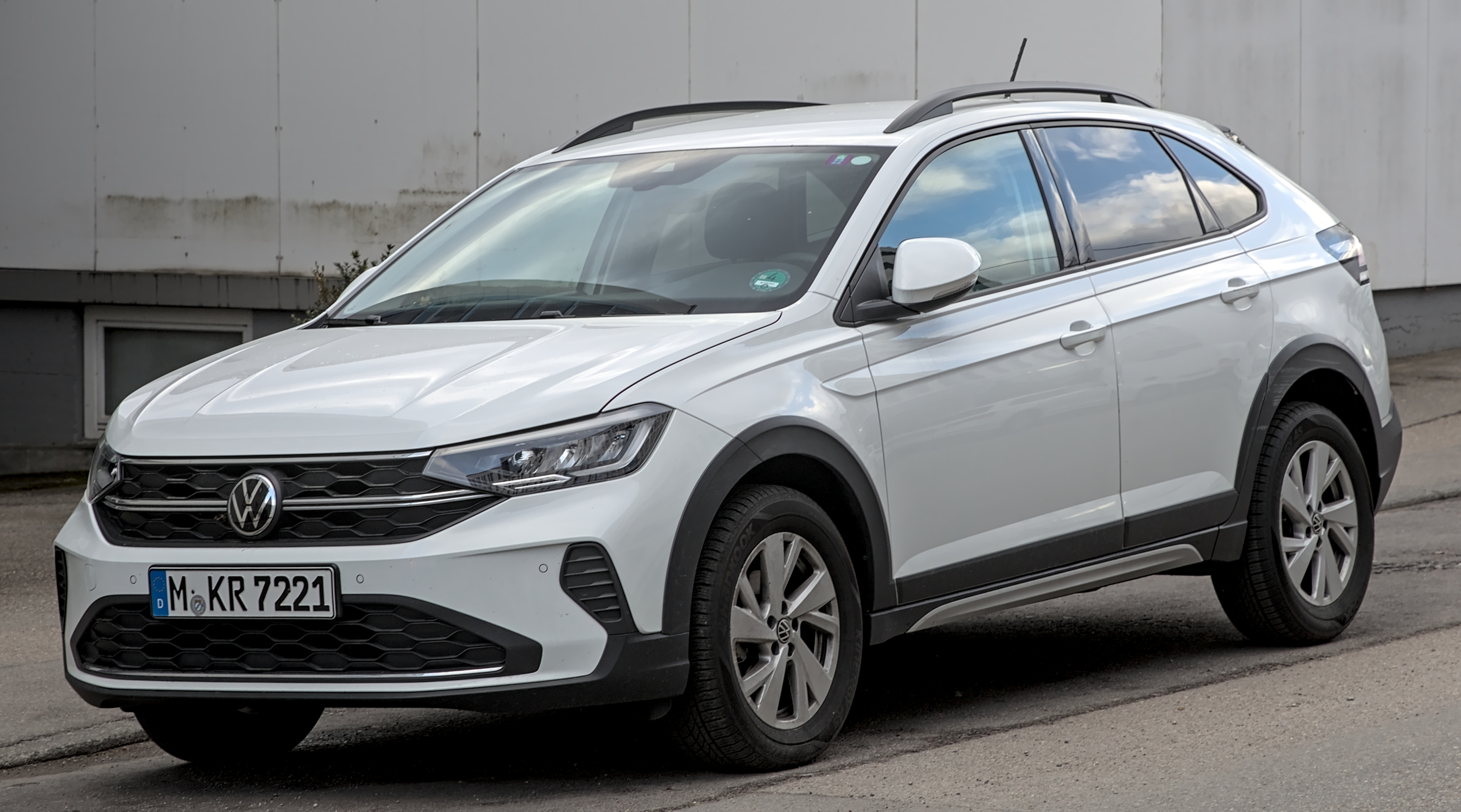
Volkswagen Nivus/Taigo

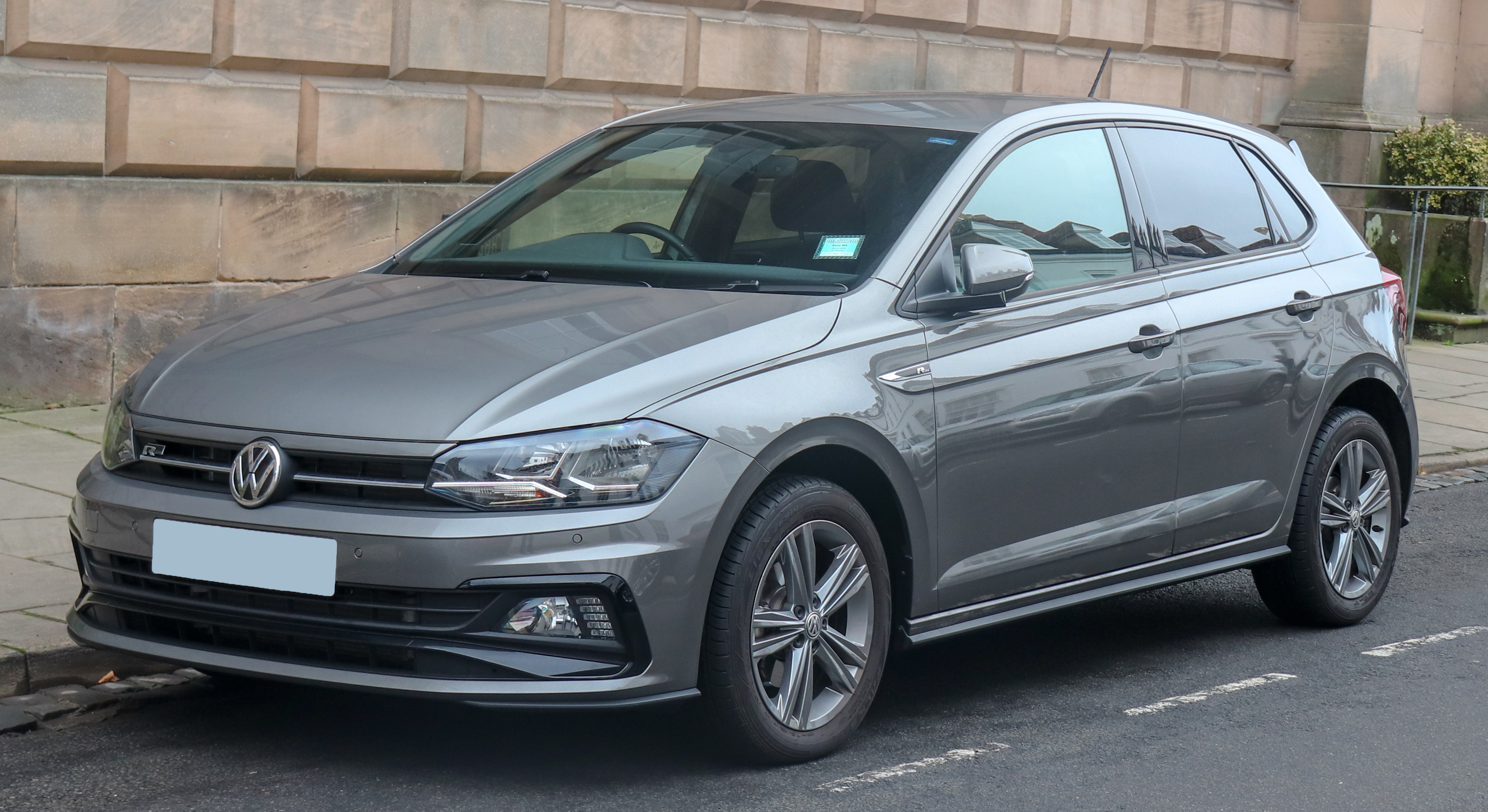
Volkswagen Polo

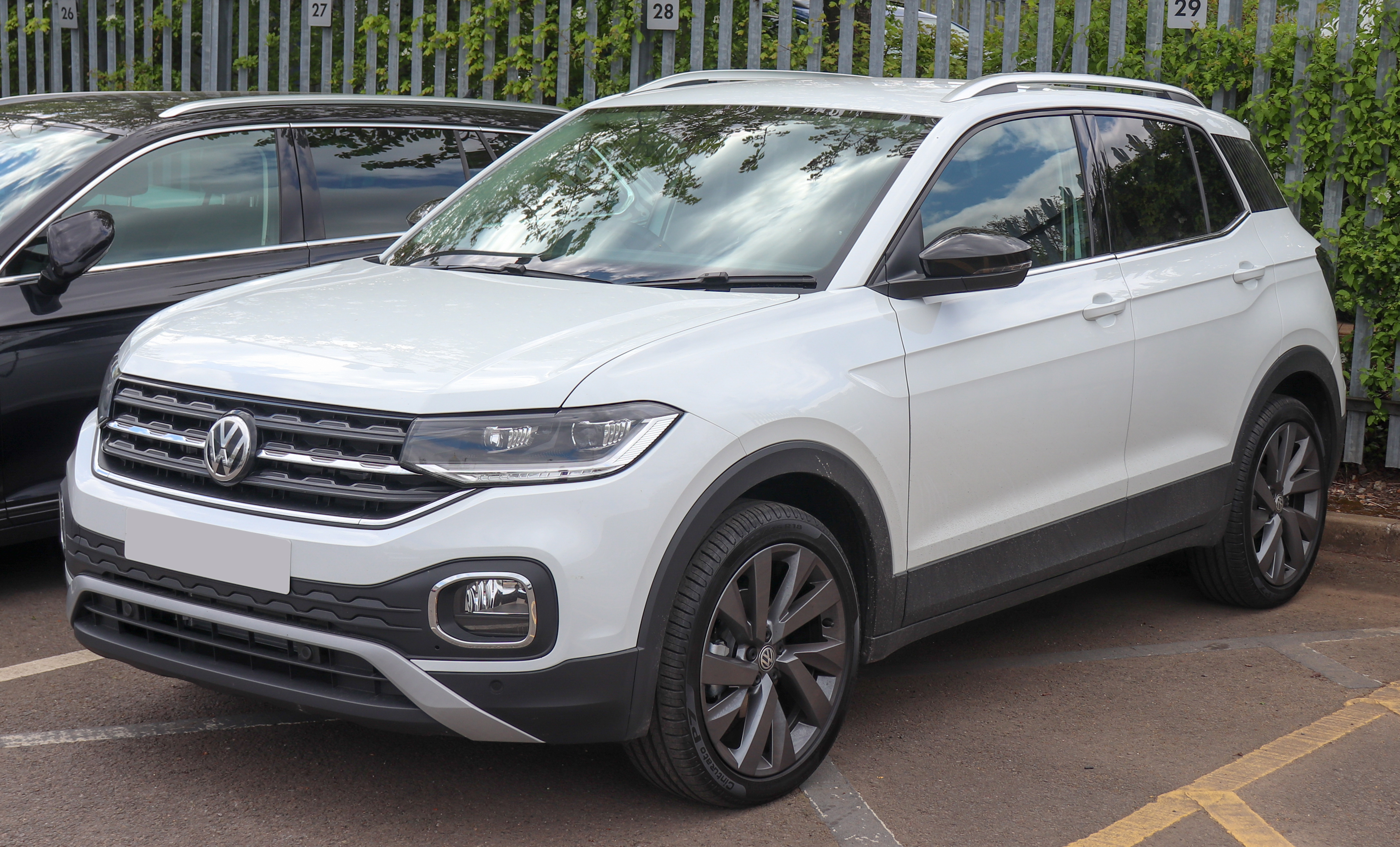
Volkswagen T-Cross

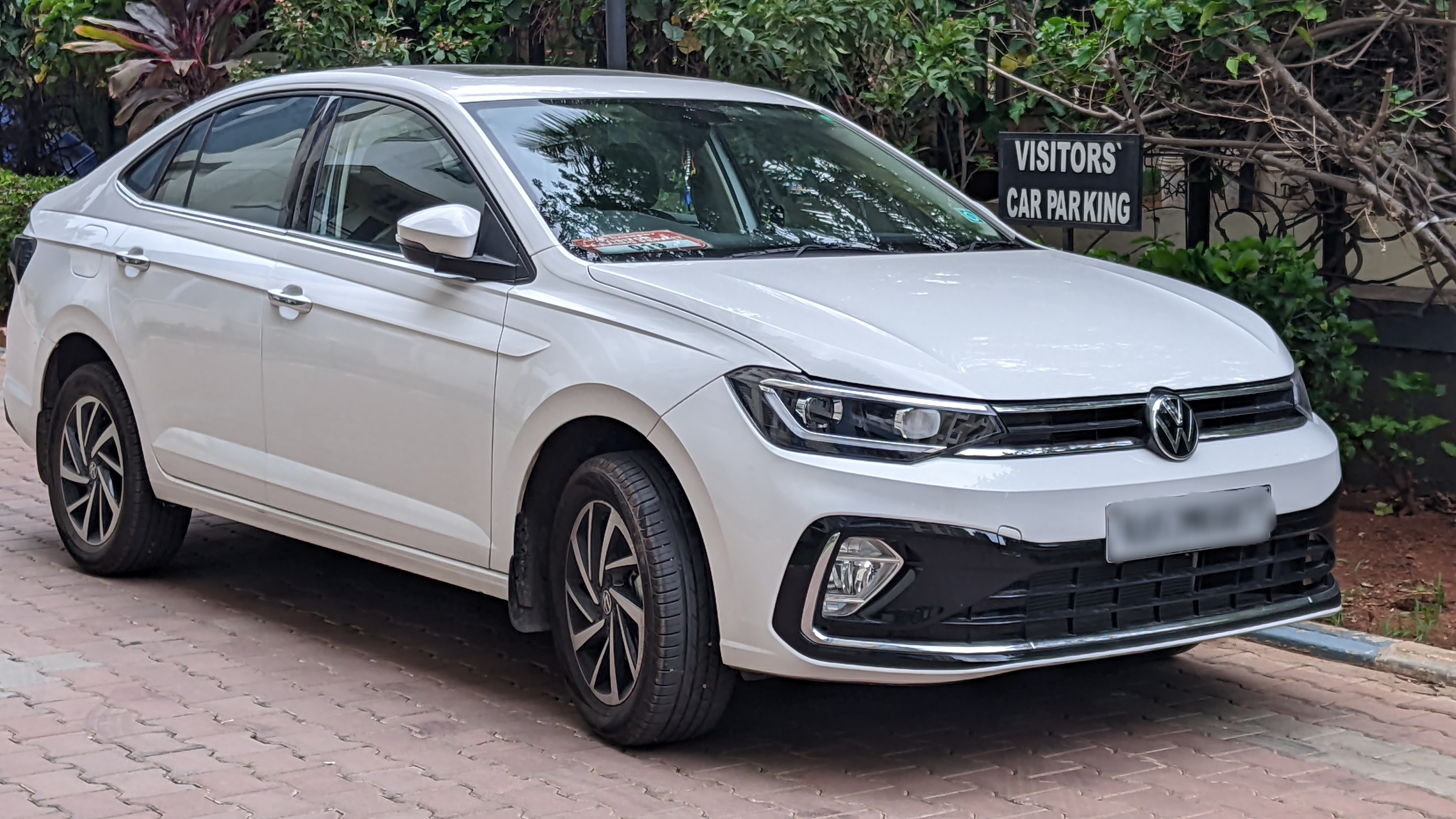
Volkswagen Virtus

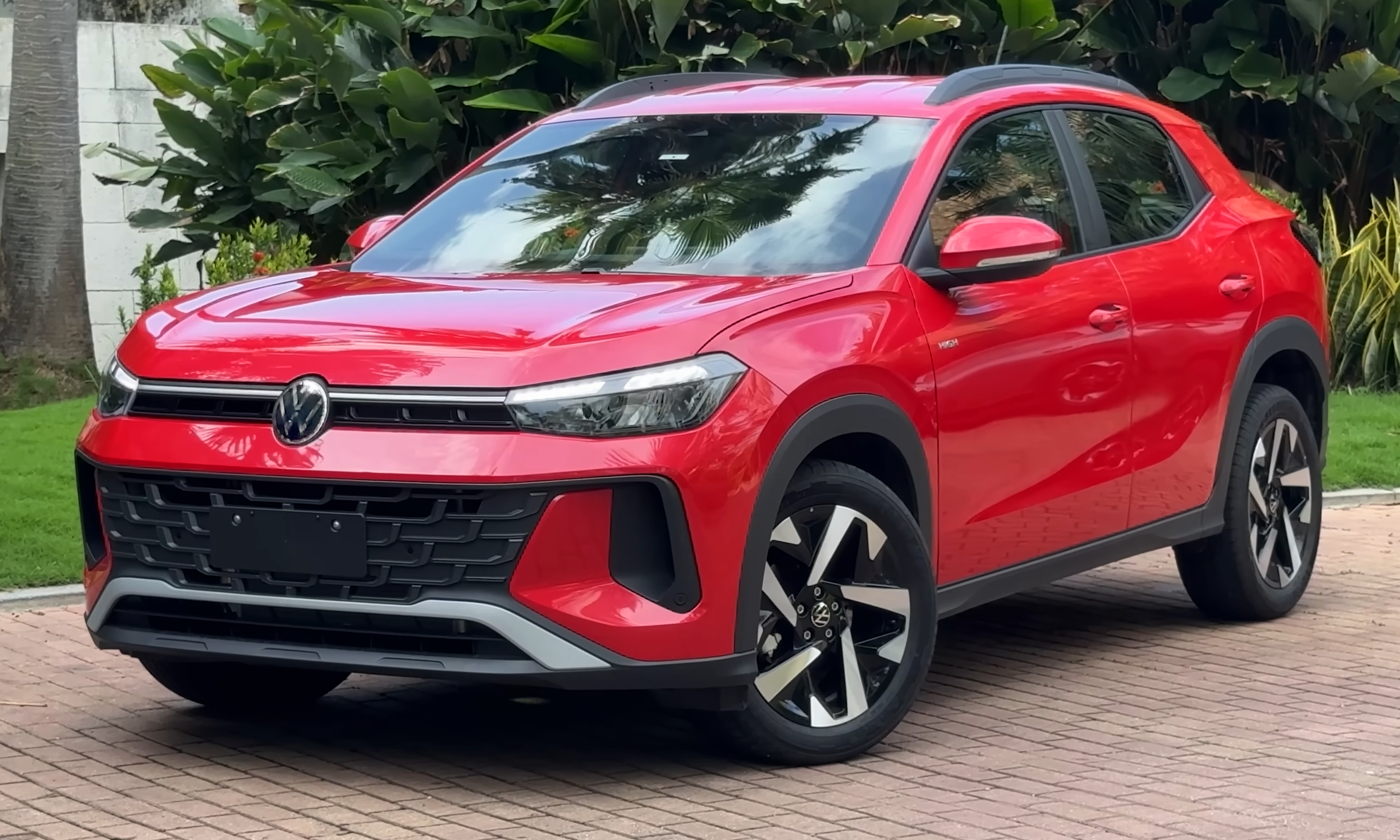
Volkswagen Tera

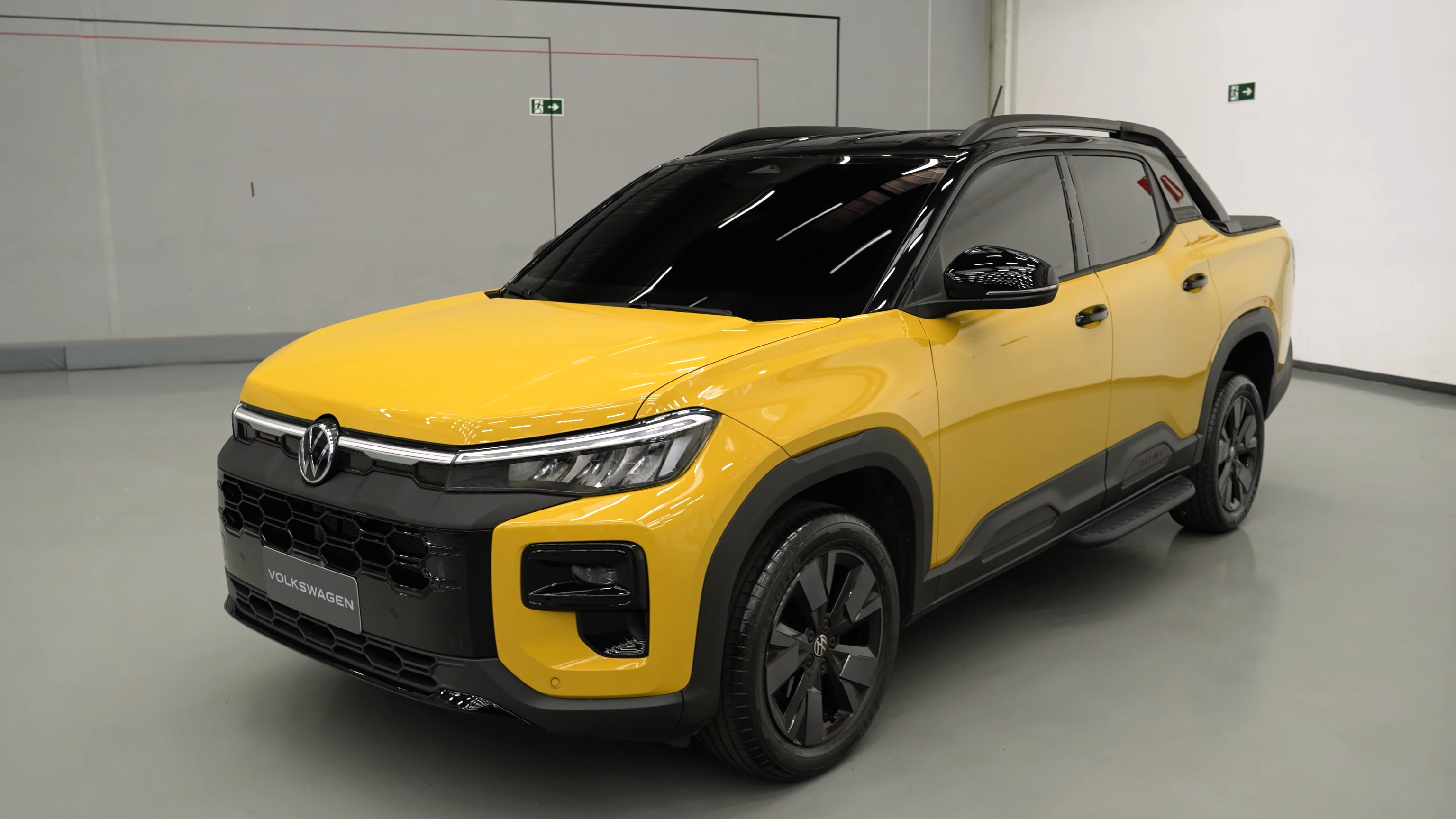
Volkswagen Tukan

== MQB A0 IN ==
A low-cost variation of the A0 platform for the Indian market was introduced in 2019 and utilized for vehicles released from 2021.

- Škoda Kushaq (2021–present)
- Škoda Slavia (2021–present)
- Škoda Kylaq (2025–present)
- Volkswagen Taigun/T-Cross (2021–present)
- Volkswagen Virtus / Polo Sedan (2022–present)
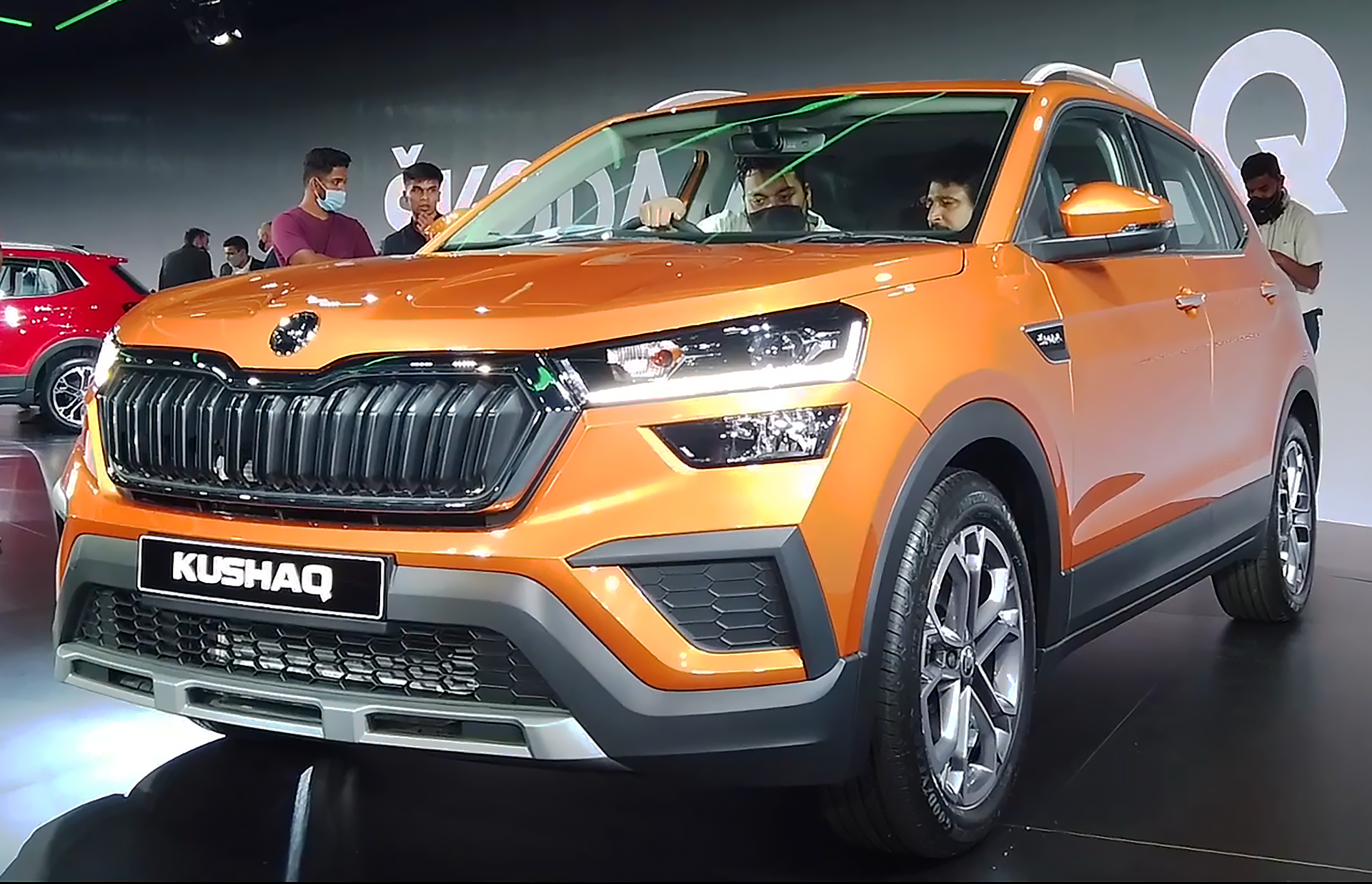
Škoda Kushaq

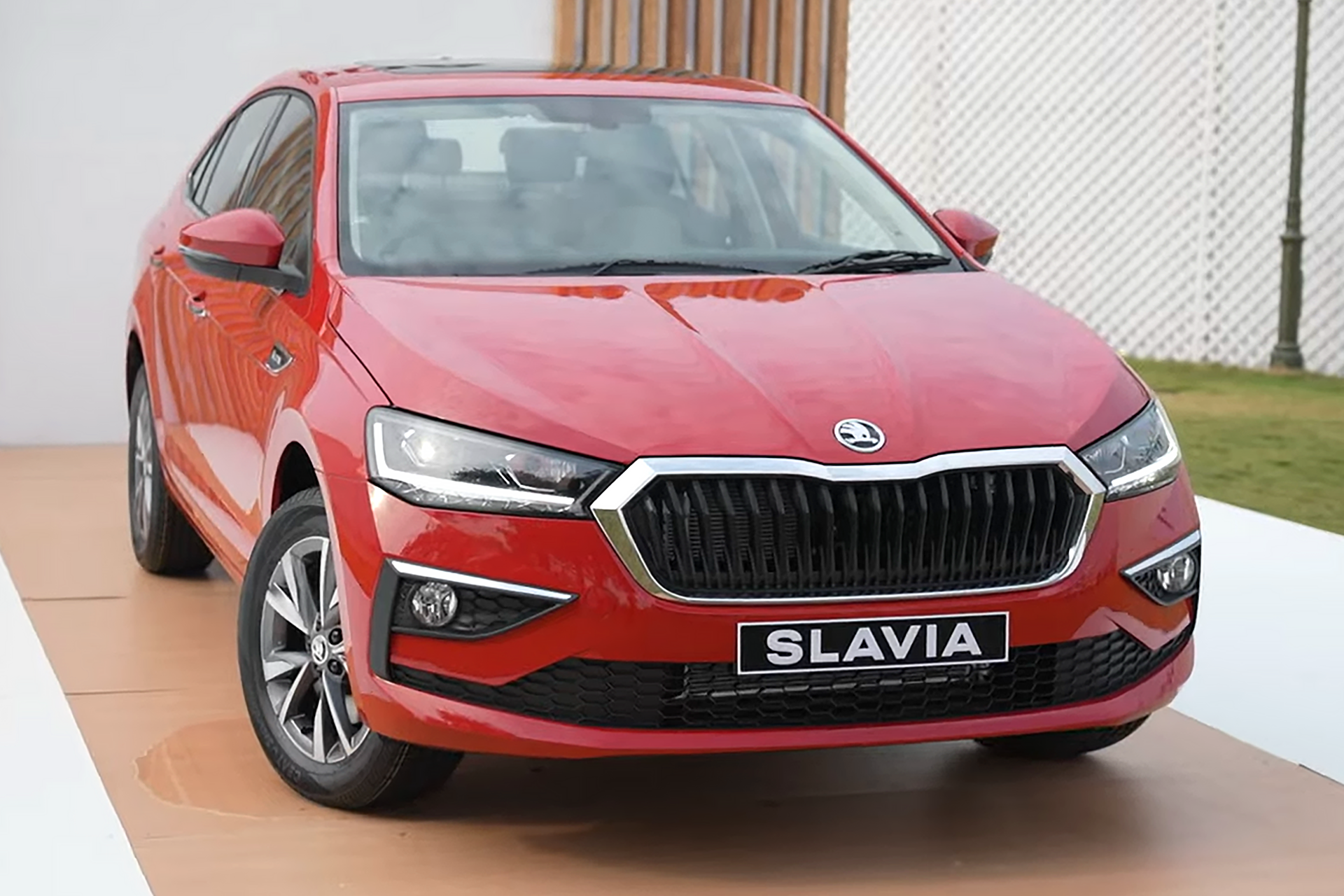
Škoda Slavia

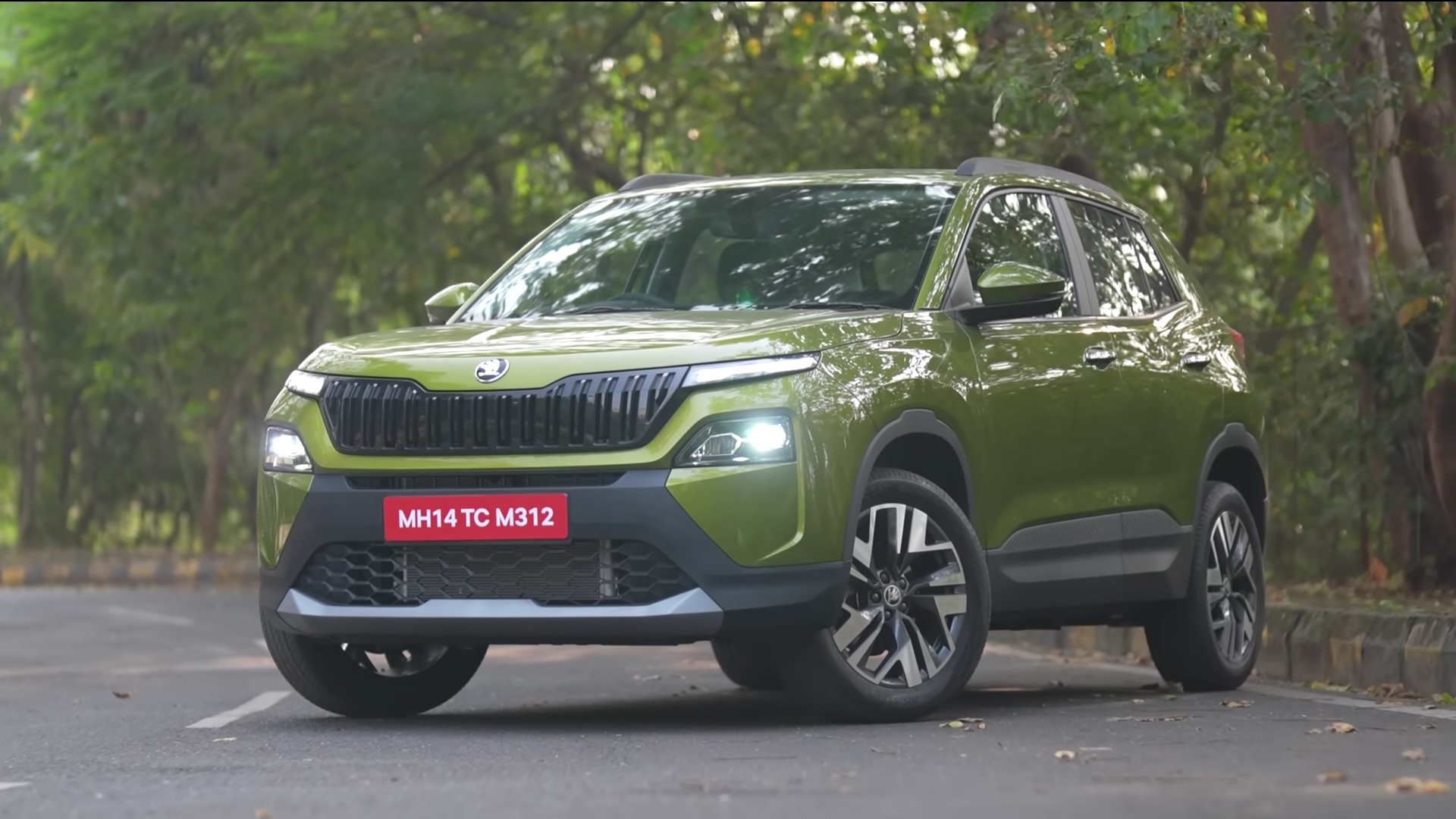
Škoda Kylaq

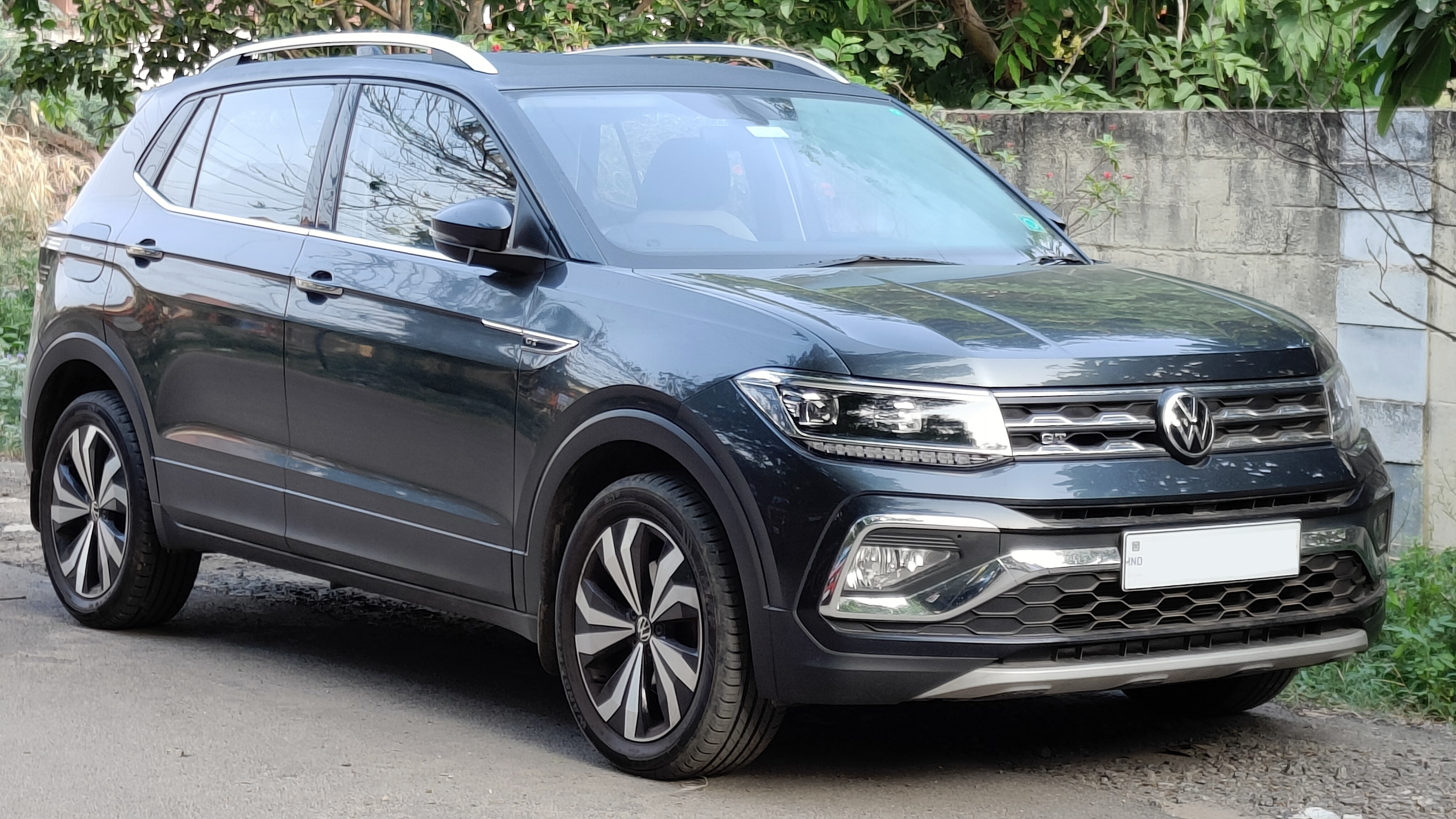
Volkswagen Taigun/T-Cross

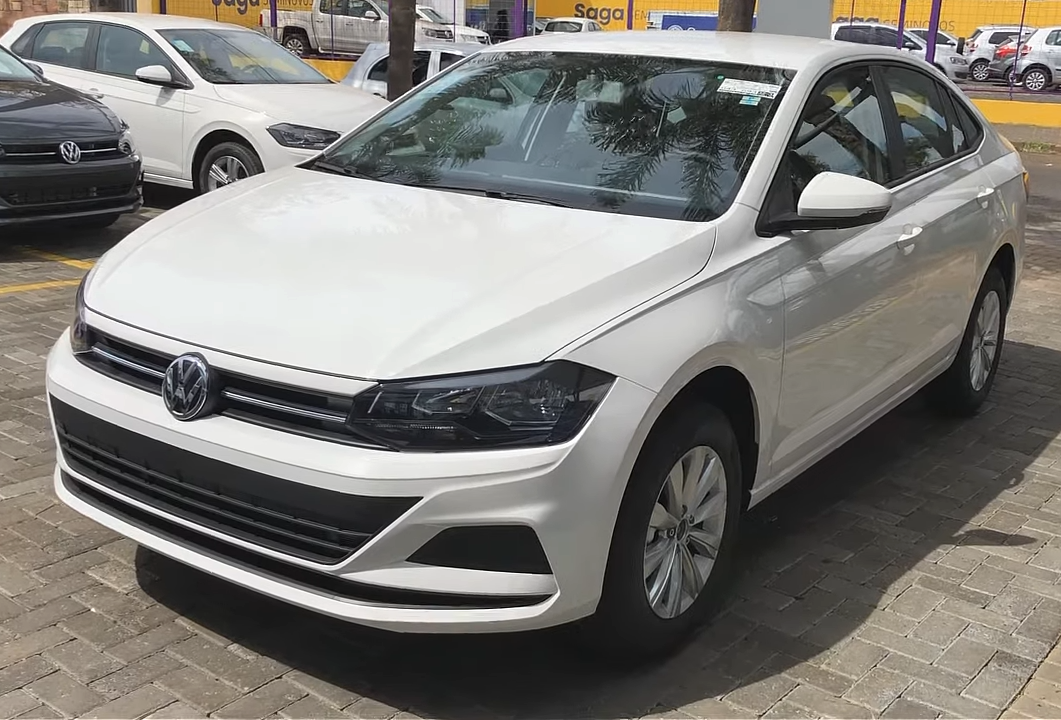
Volkswagen Virtus / Polo Sedan

== MQB A1 ==
- Audi Q2 (2016–2026)
- Jetta VS5 (2019–present)
- SEAT Ateca (2016–2026)
- Škoda Karoq (2017–present)
- Volkswagen Bora Mk4 (2018–2026)
- Volkswagen Sagitar S (2026–present)
- Volkswagen Jetta/Sagitar/Vento Mk7 (2018–present)
  - Jetta VA7 (2025–present)
- Volkswagen Lavida Mk3 (2018–present)
- Volkswagen T-Roc (2017–present)
  - T-Roc Cabriolet (2020–present)
- Volkswagen Taos/Tharu (2018–present)
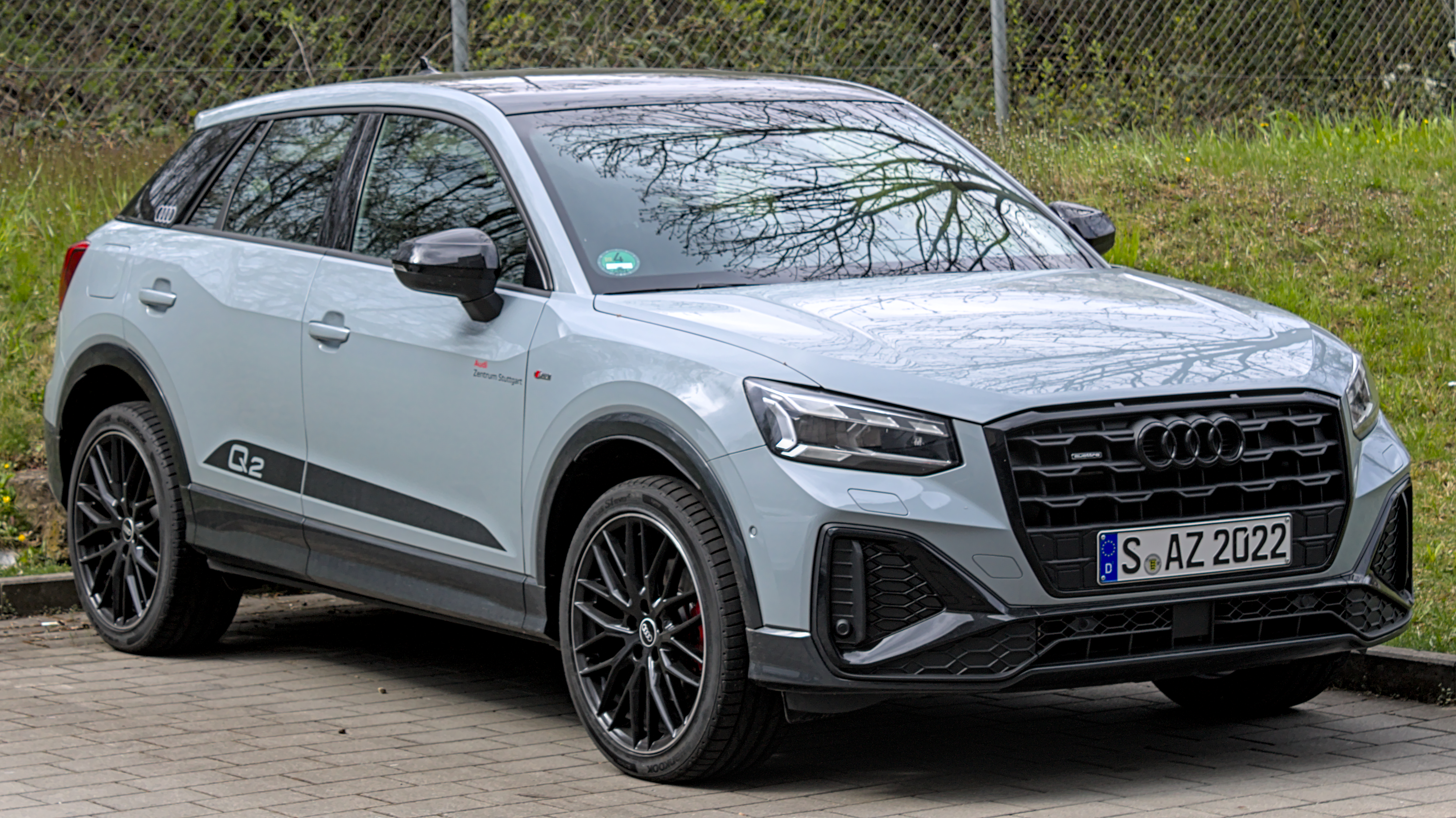
Audi Q2

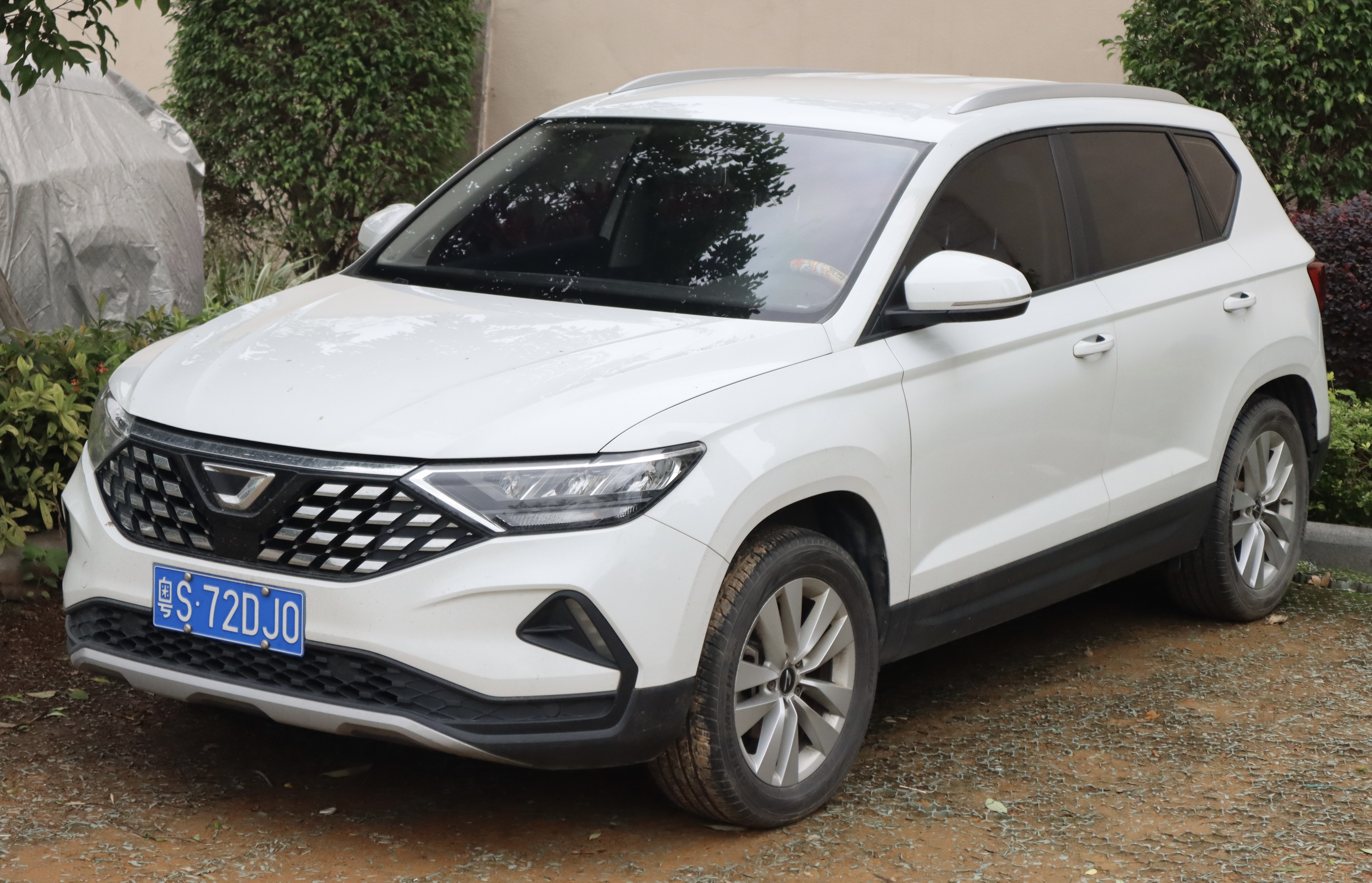
Jetta VS5

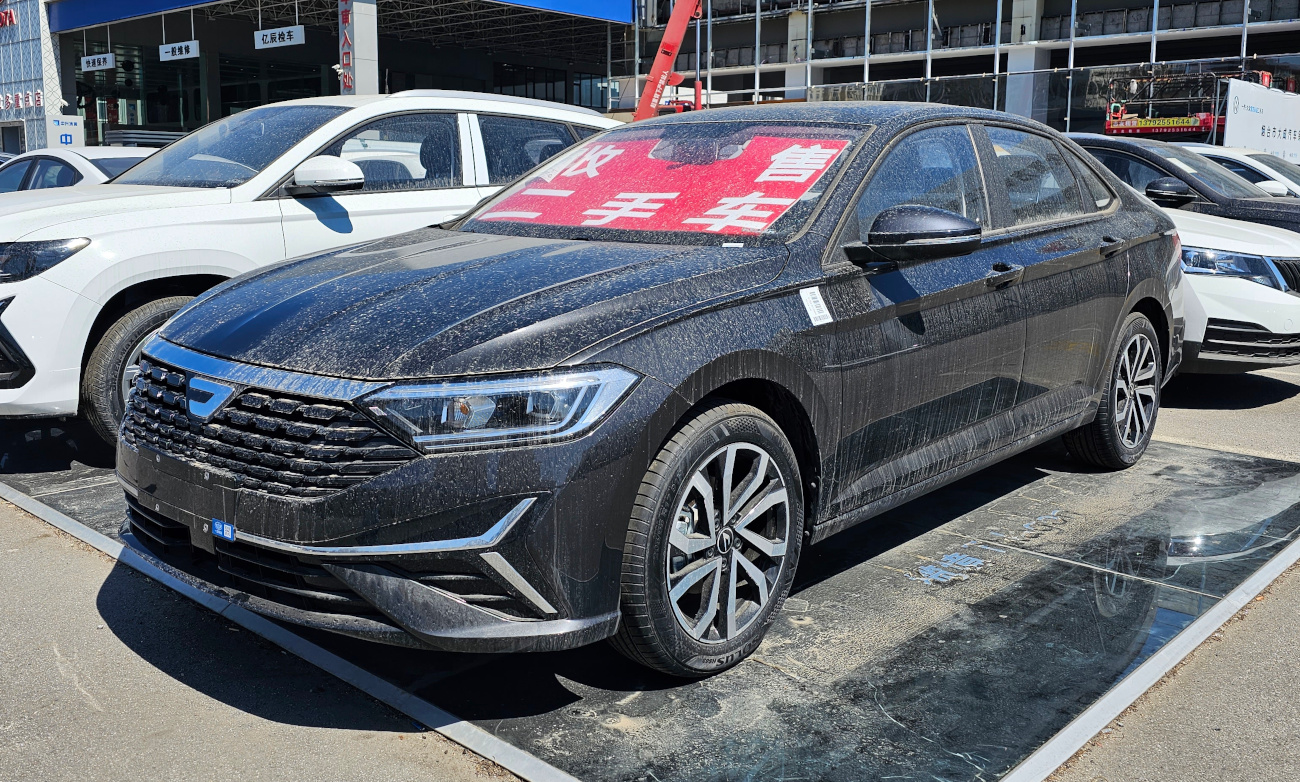
Jetta VA7

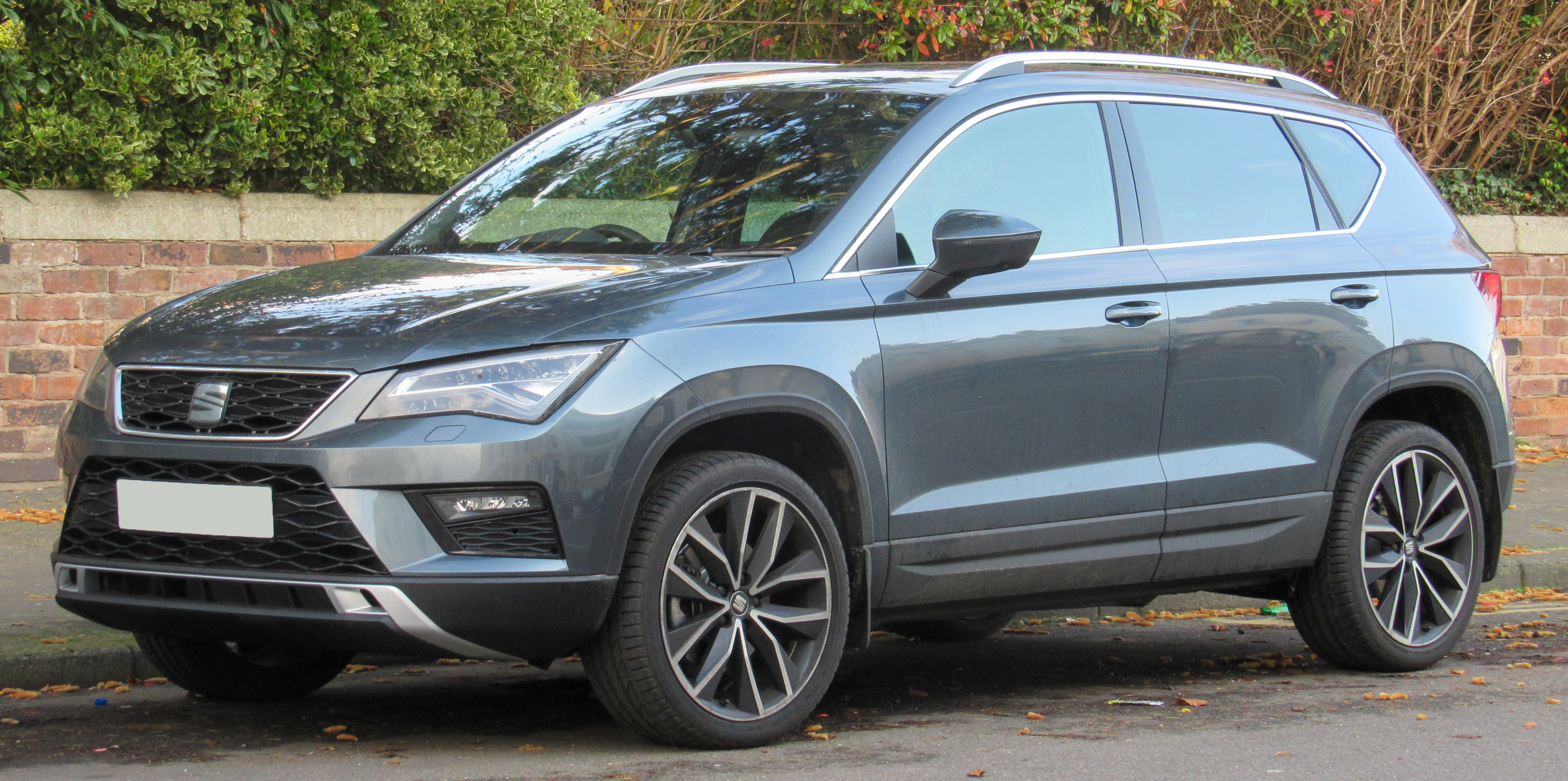
SEAT Ateca

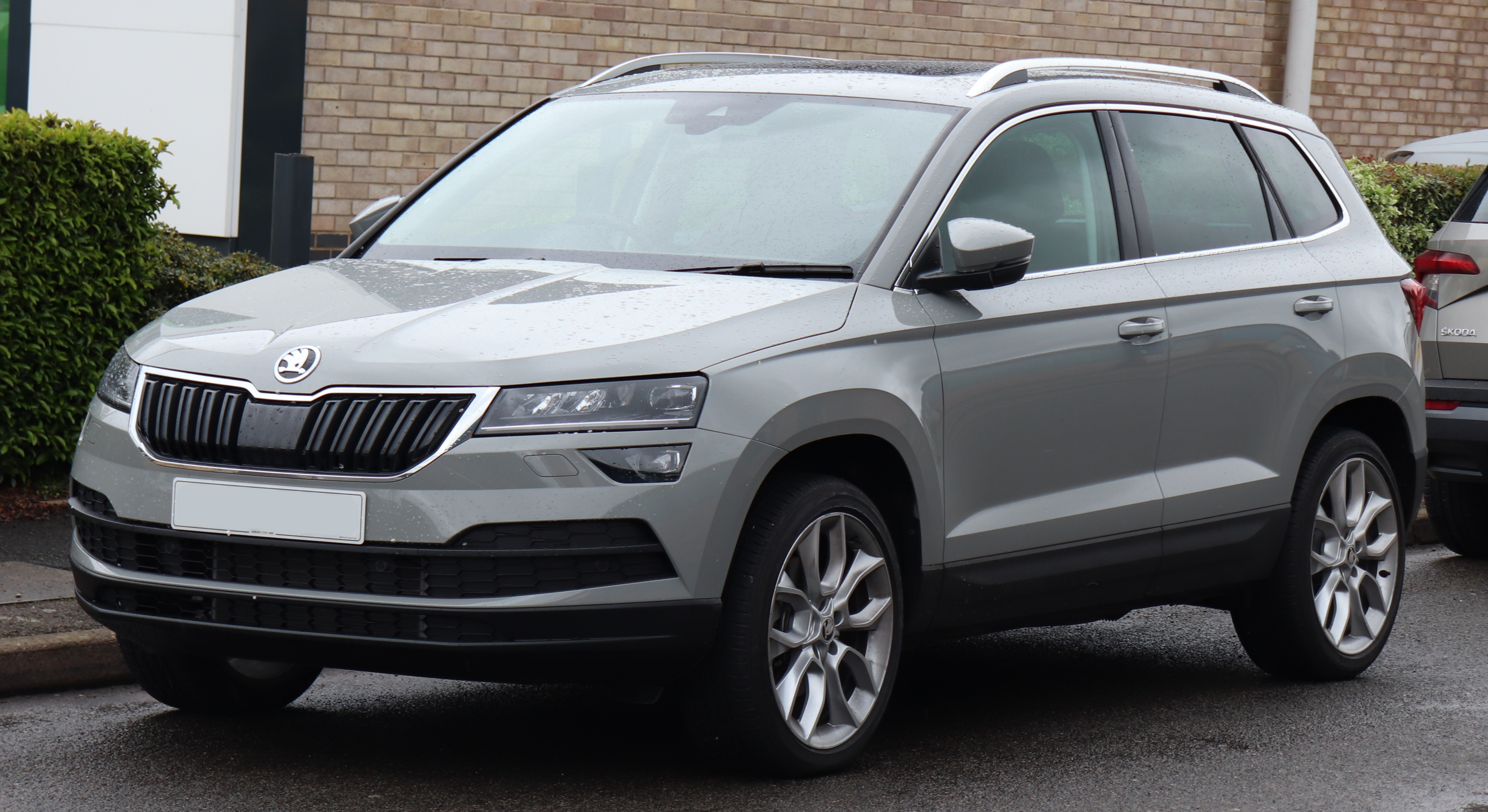
Škoda Karoq

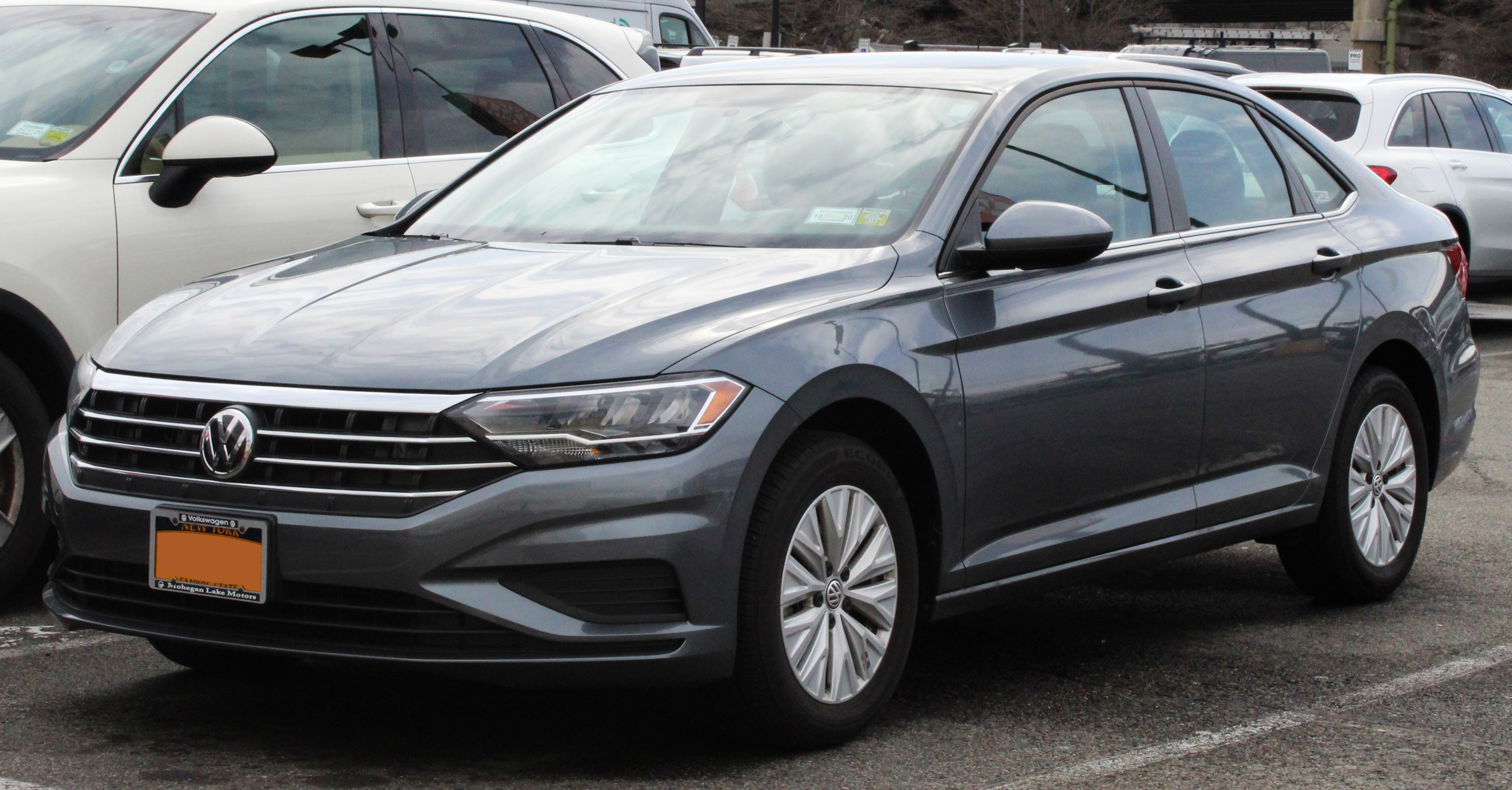
Volkswagen Jetta

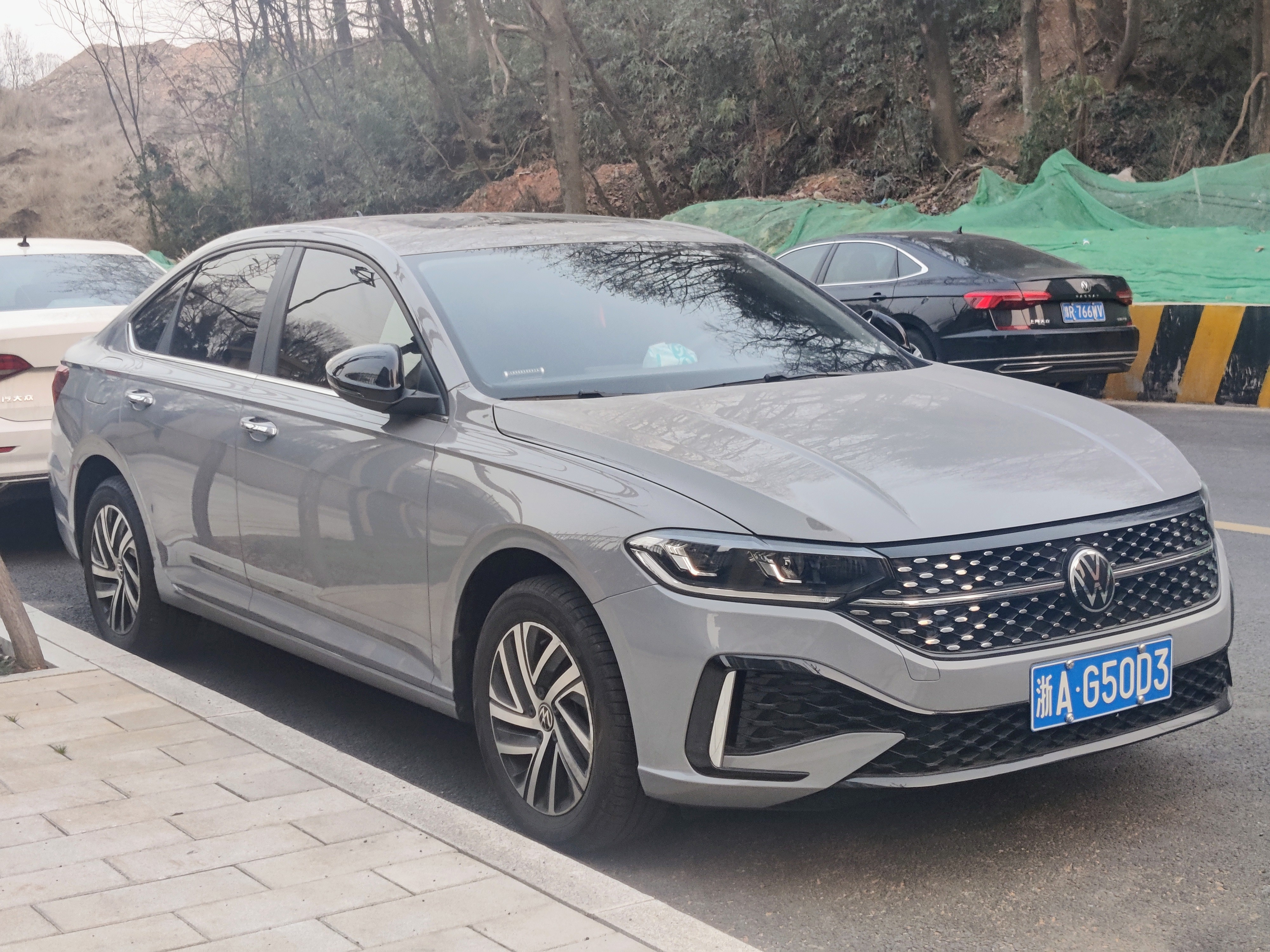
Volkswagen Lavida

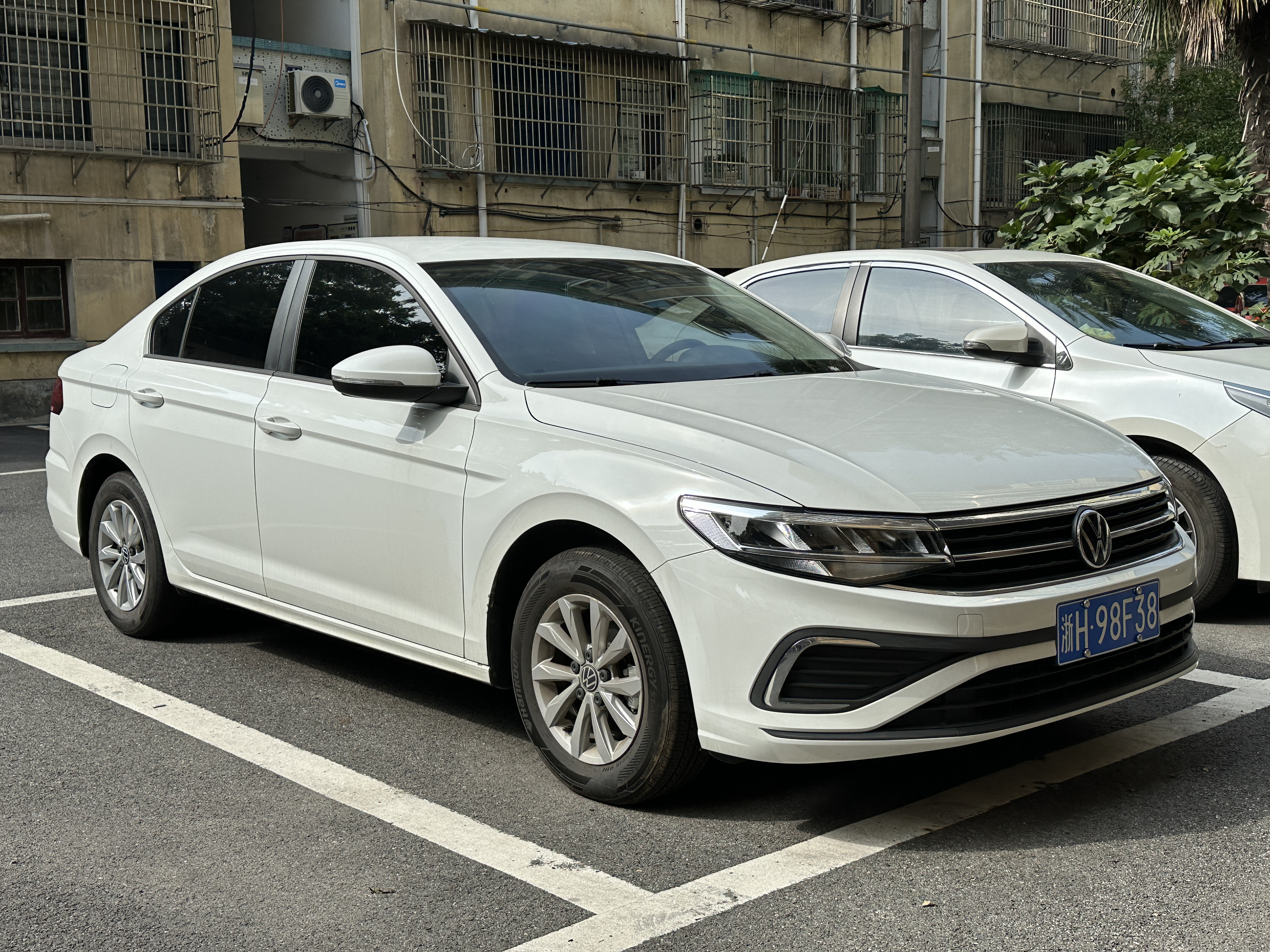
Volkswagen Bora

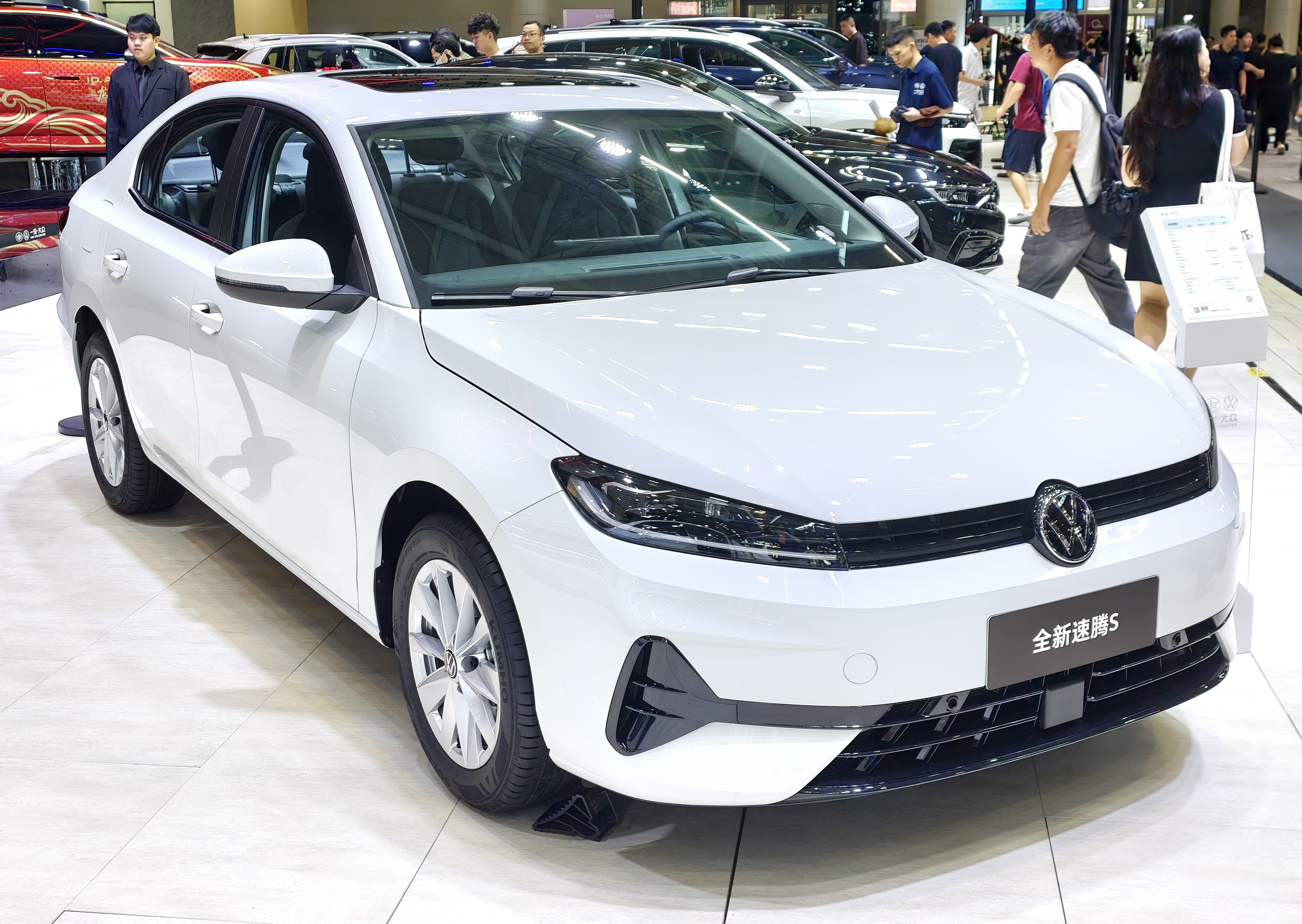
Volkswagen Sagitar S

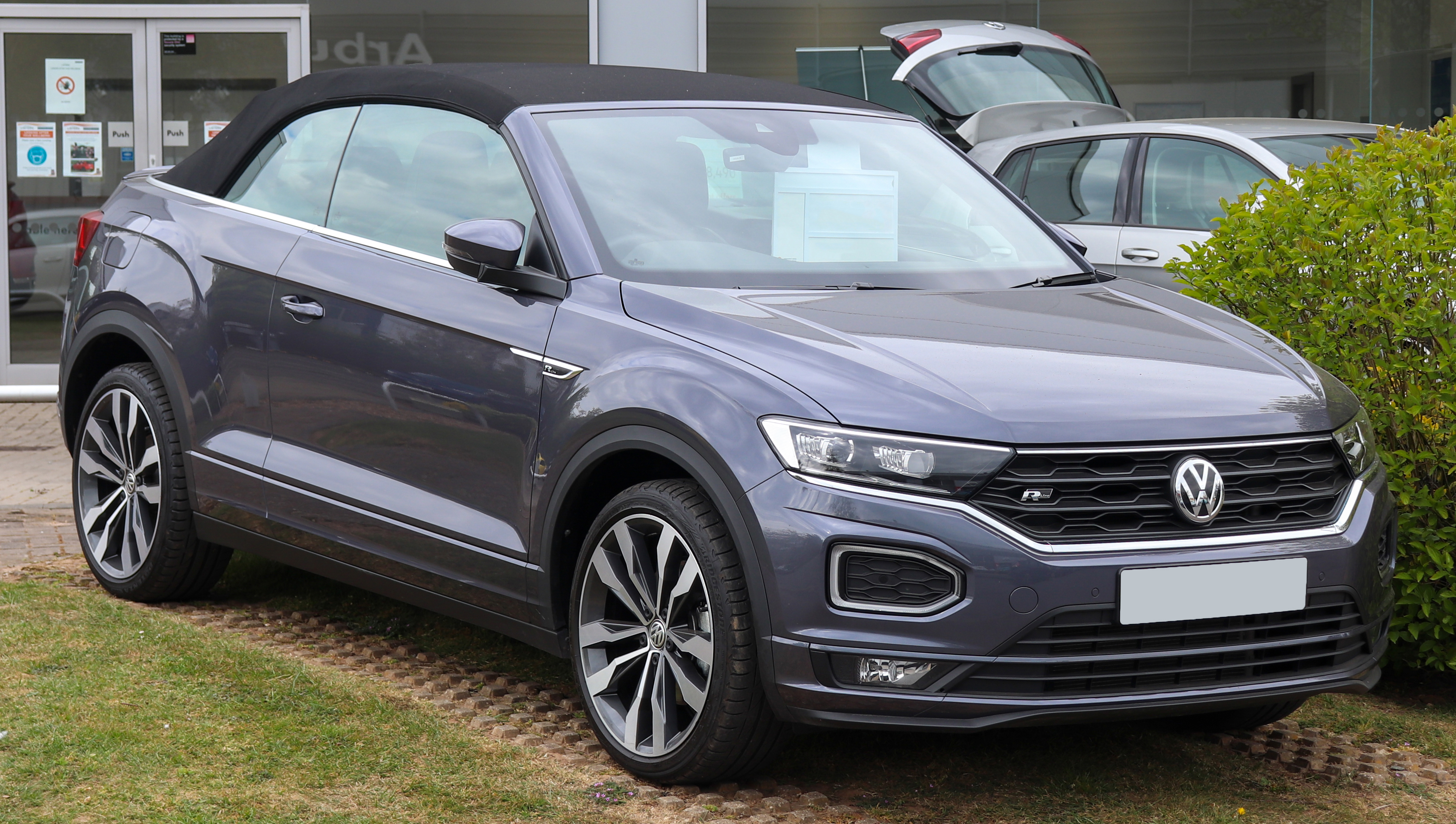
Volkswagen T-Roc Cabriolet

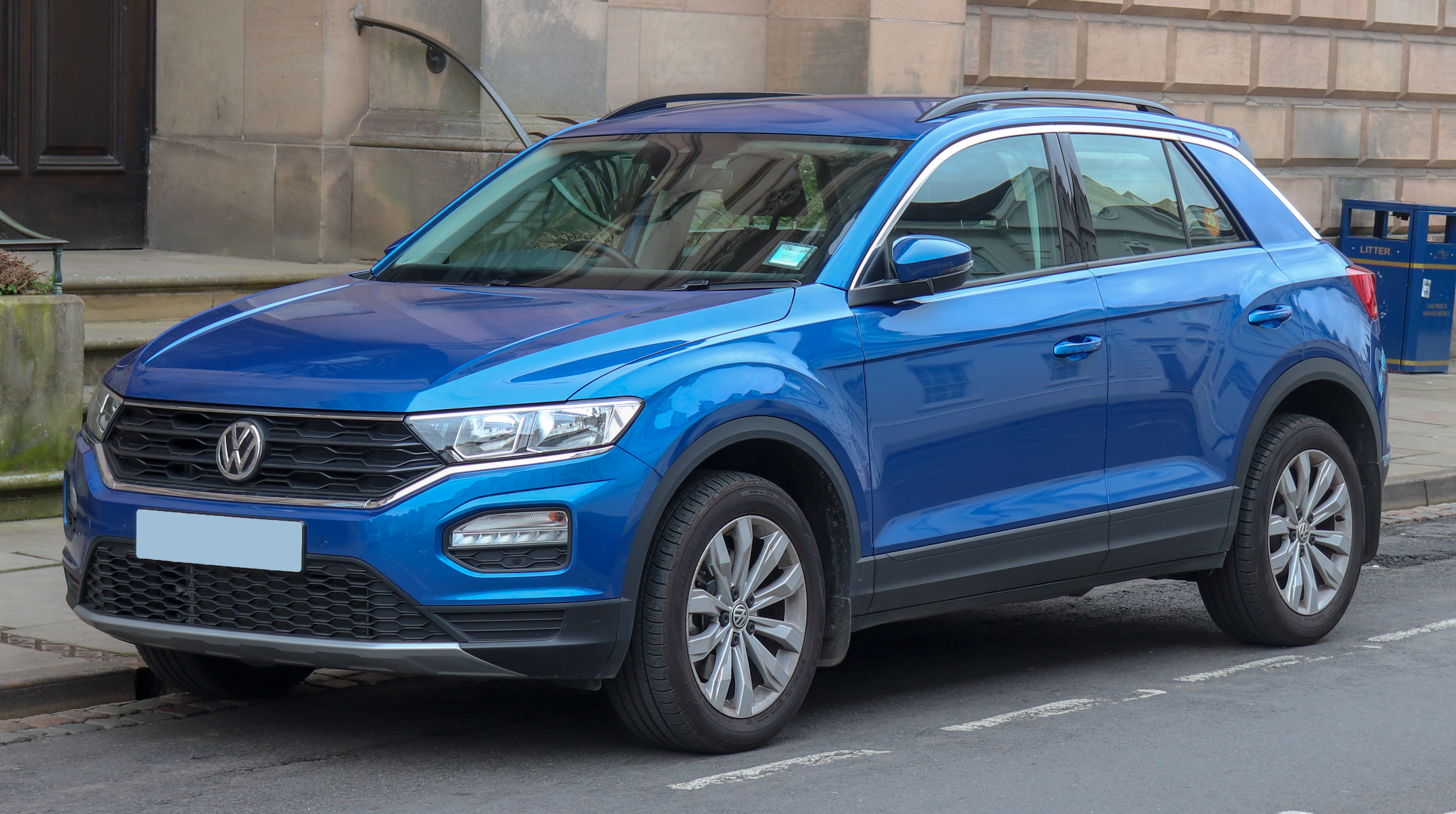
Volkswagen T-Roc

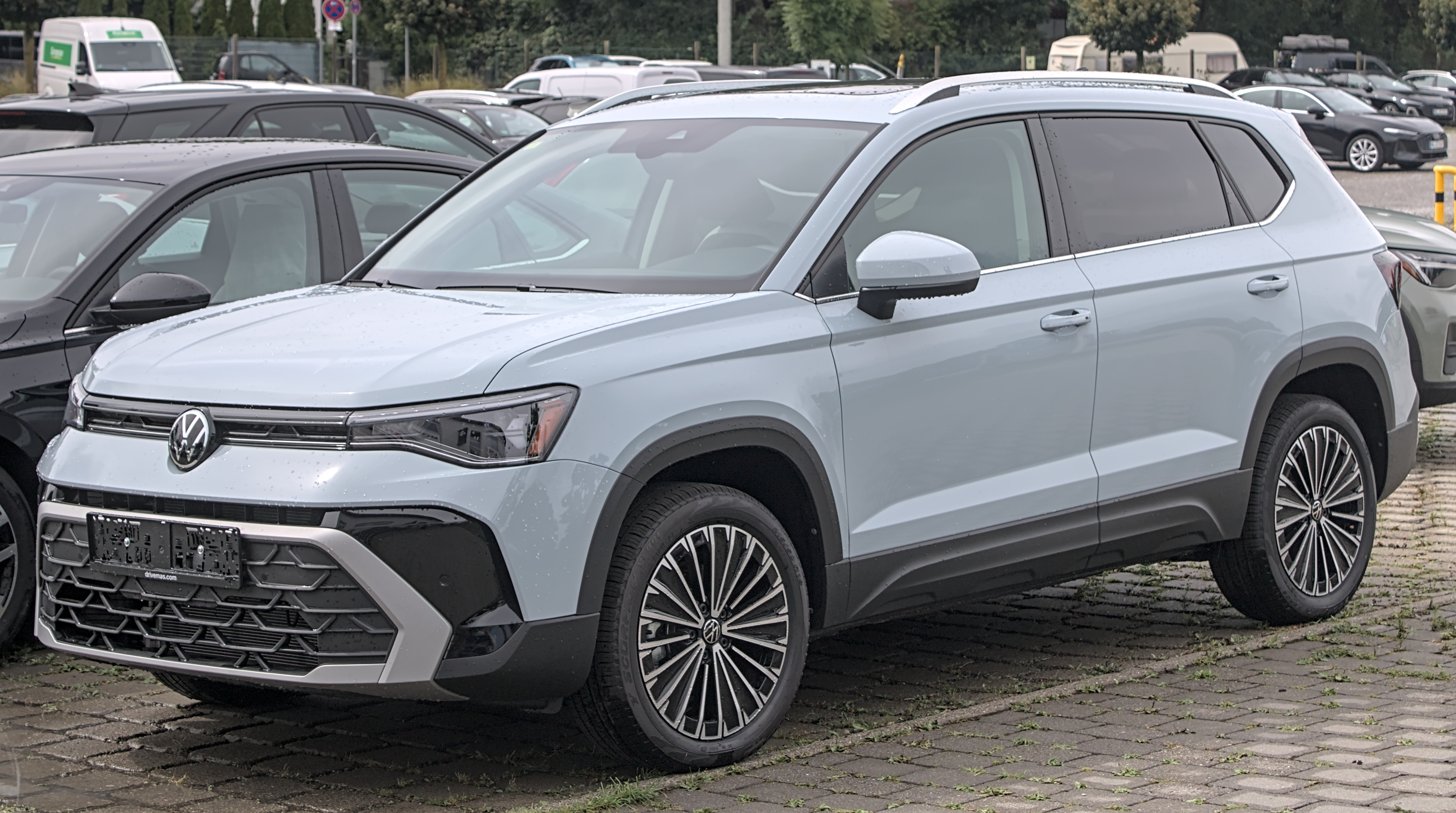
Volkswagen Taos

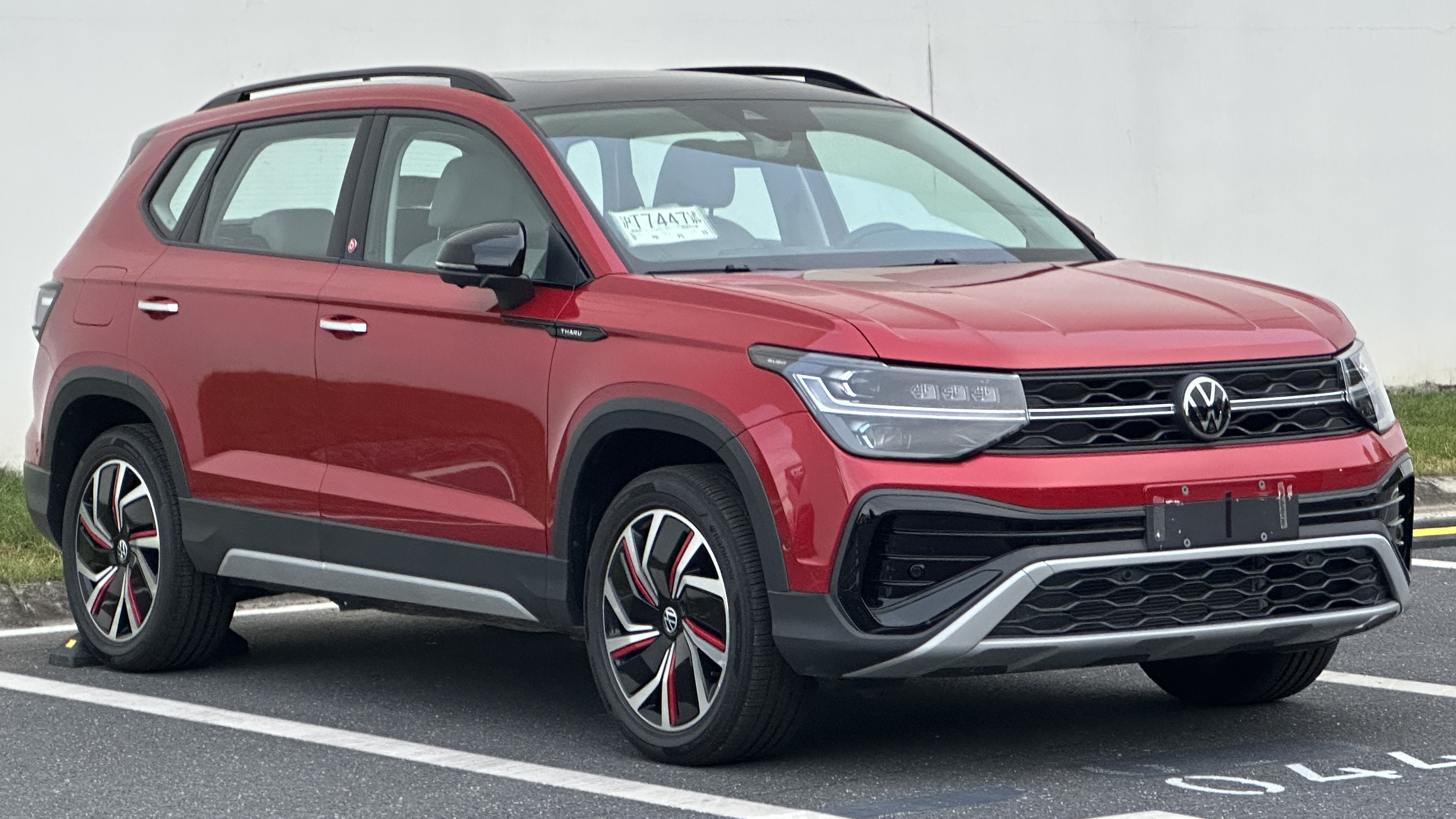
Volkswagen Tharu

== MQB A2 ==
- Audi Q3 Mk2 (2018–2025)
  - Audi Q3 Sportback (2019–2025)
- Jetta VS7 (2020–present)
- SEAT Tarraco (2018–2024)
- Škoda Kodiaq (2016–2024)
  - Kodiaq GT (2018–2026)
- Volkswagen Tayron (2018–present)
  - Tayron X (2020–2026)
- Volkswagen Tiguan Mk2 (2016–2024)
  - Tiguan Allspace/L (2017–present)
  - Tiguan X (2020–2026)
- Volkswagen Viloran (2020–present)
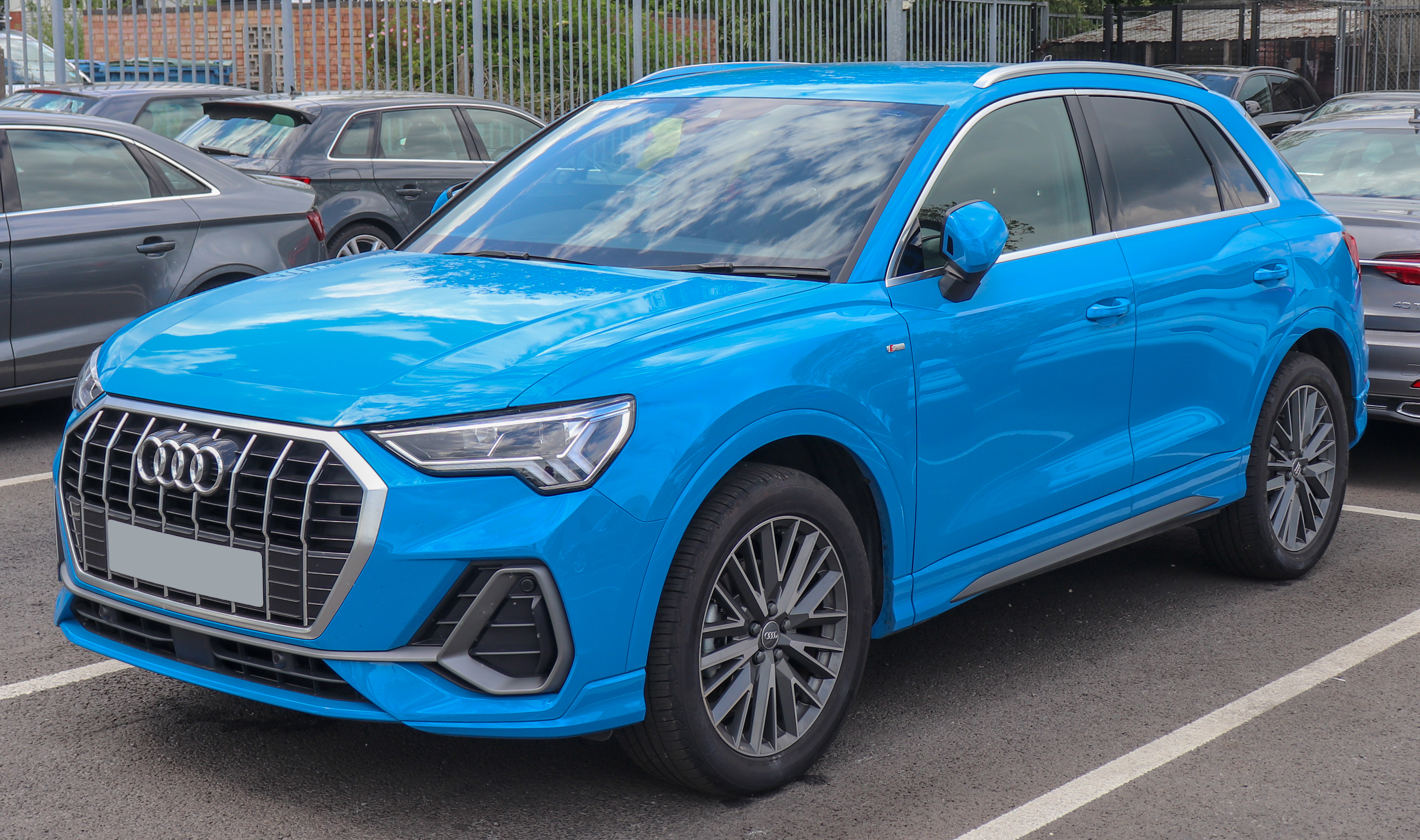
Audi Q3

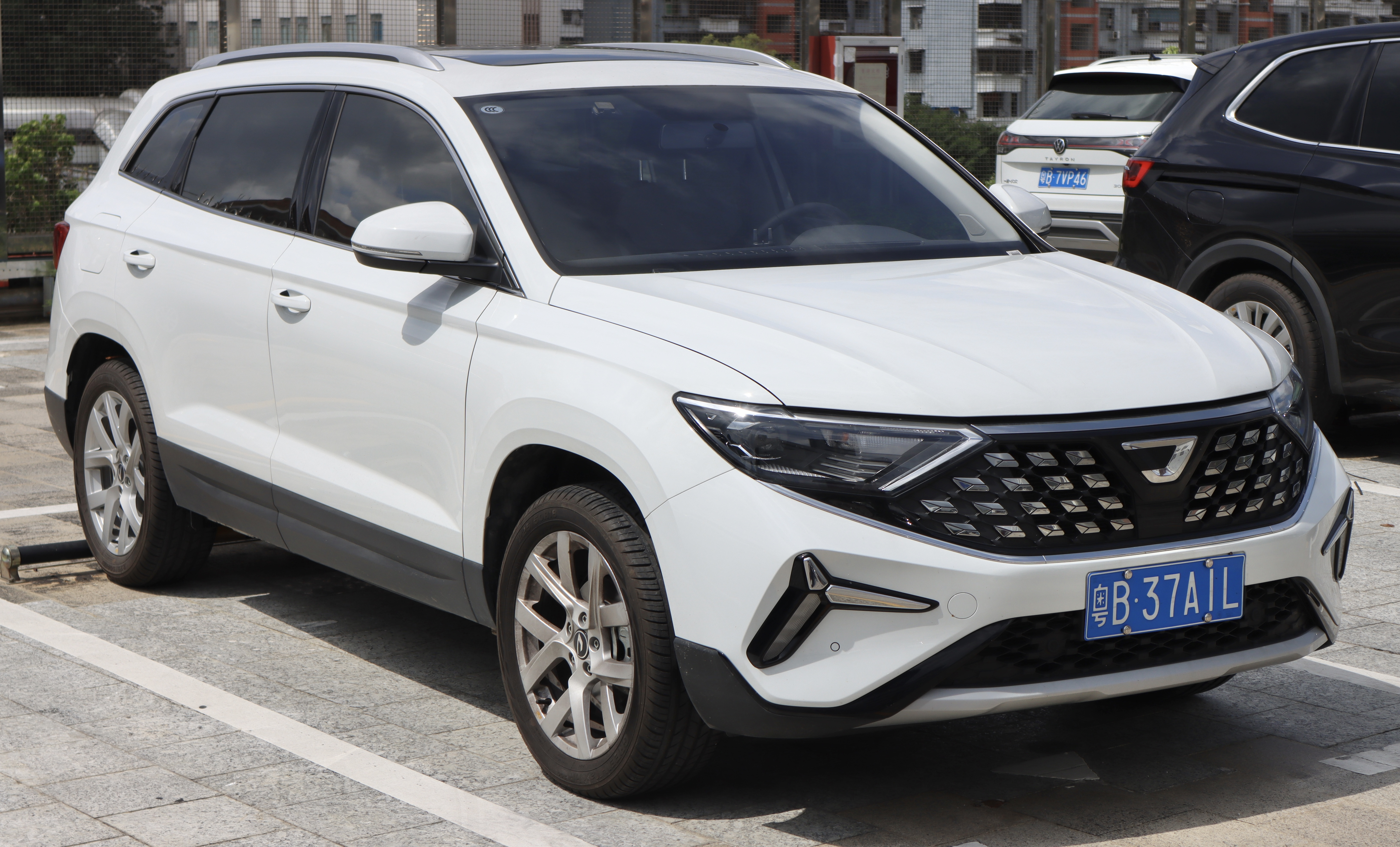
Jetta VS7

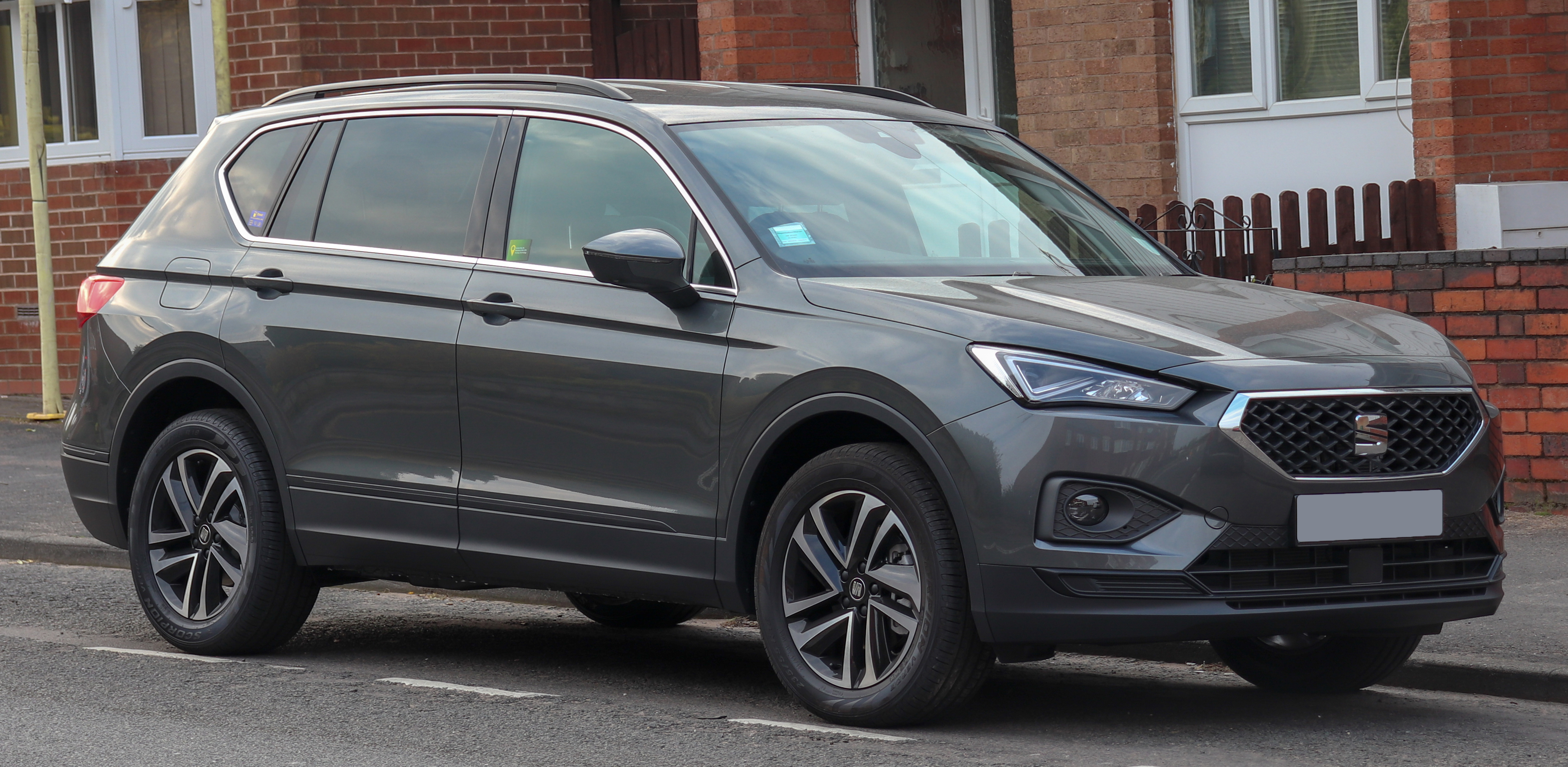
SEAT Tarraco

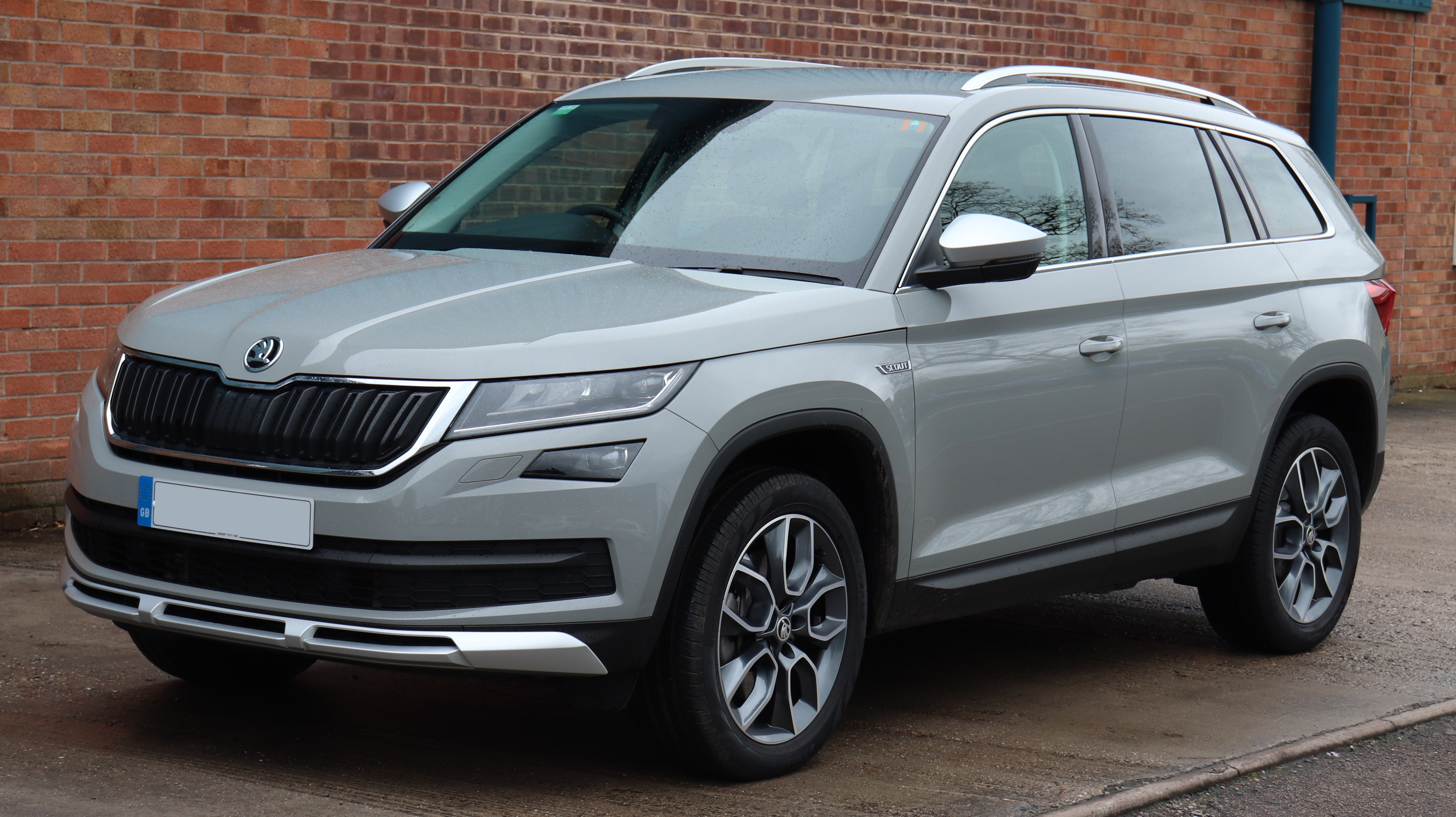
Škoda Kodiaq

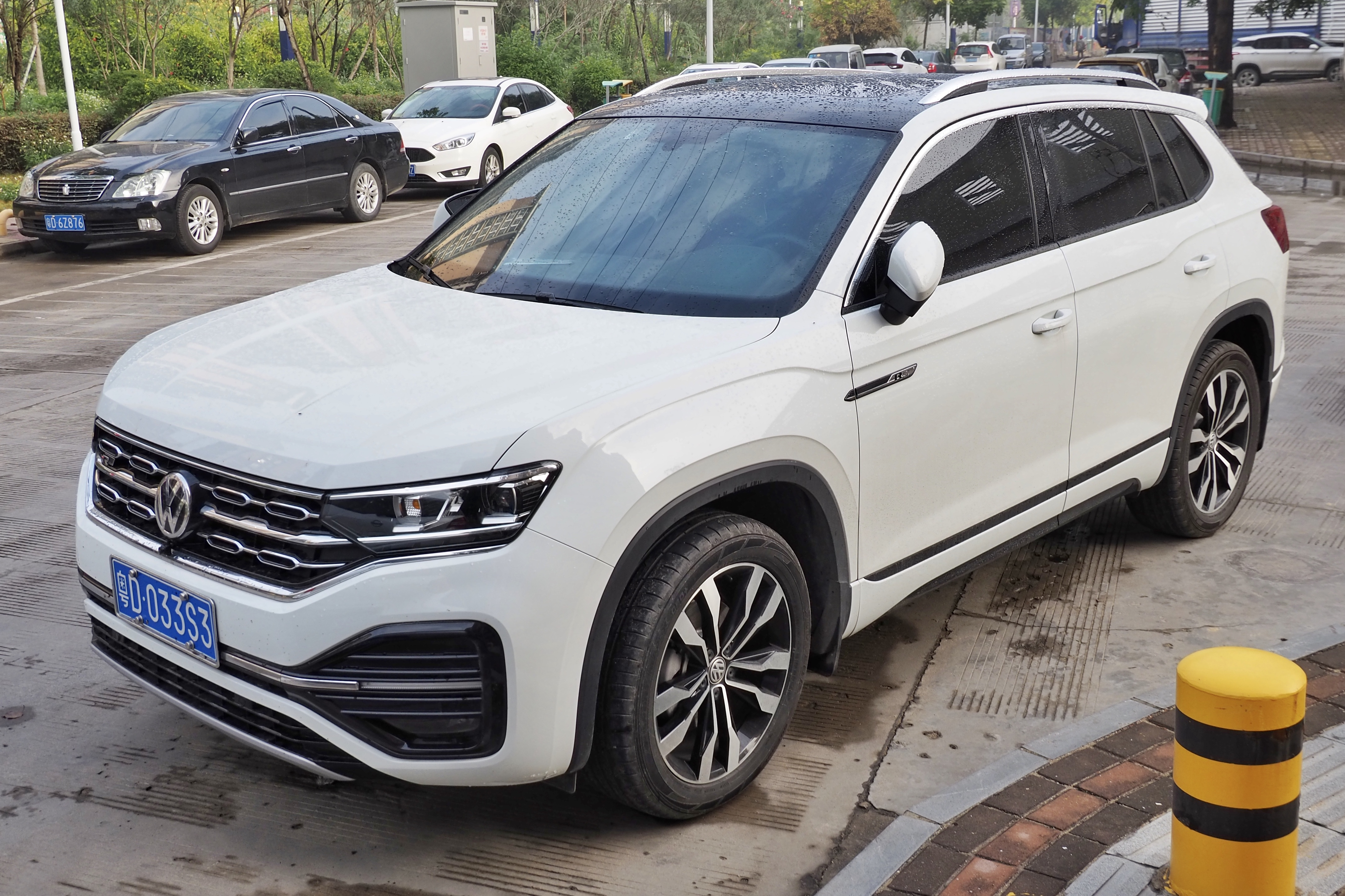
Volkswagen Tayron

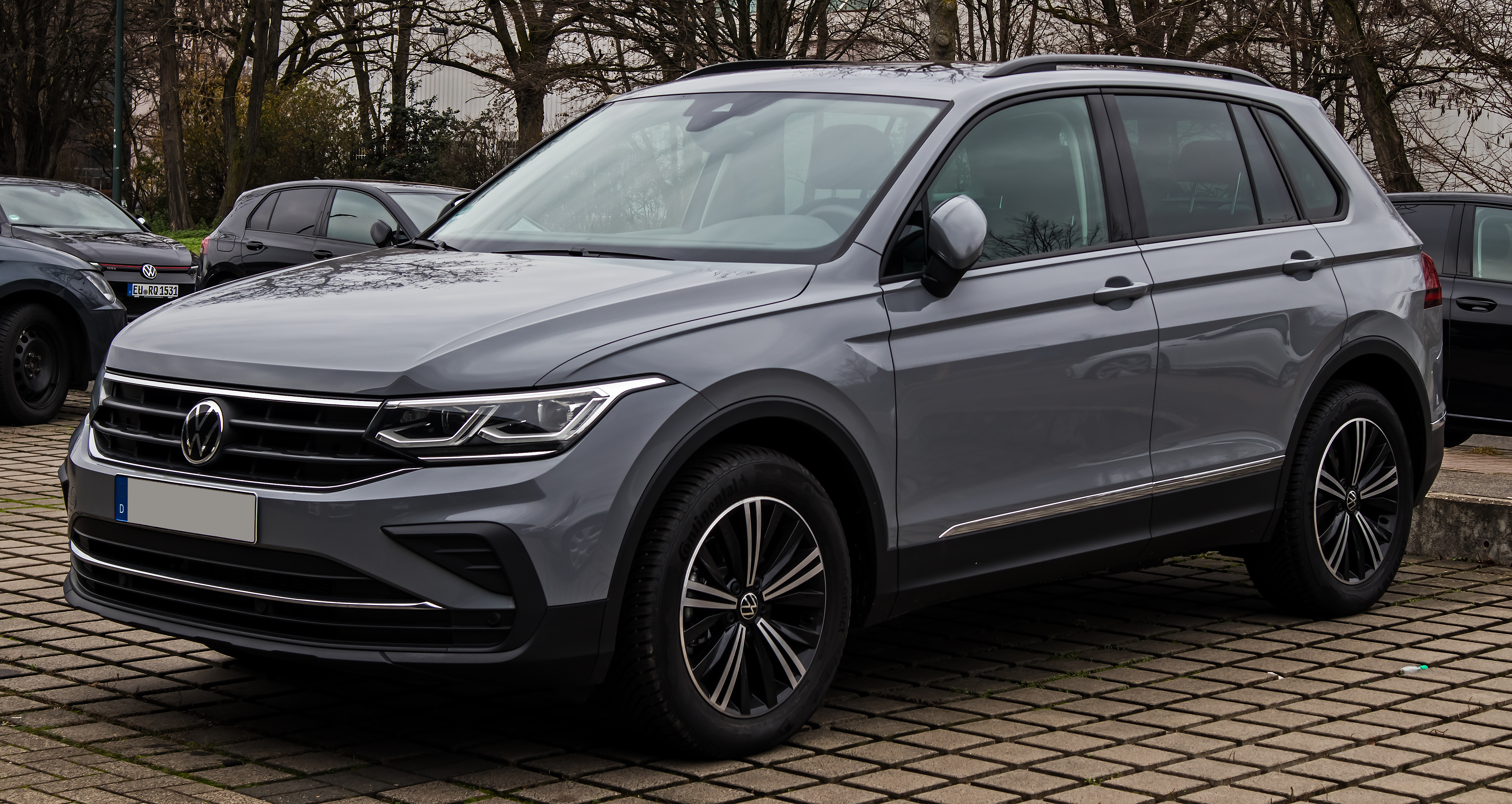
Volkswagen Tiguan

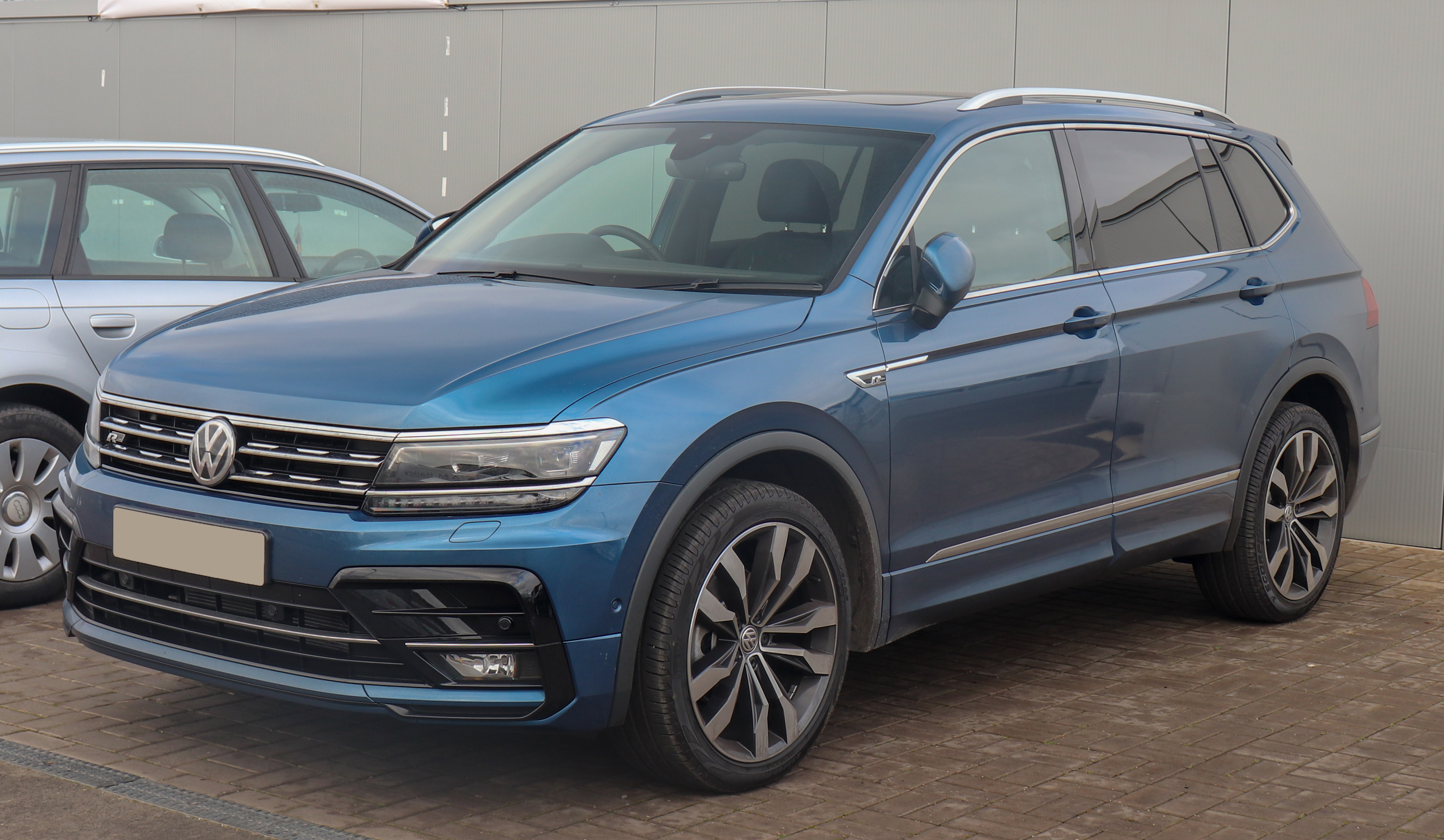
Volkswagen Tiguan Allspace

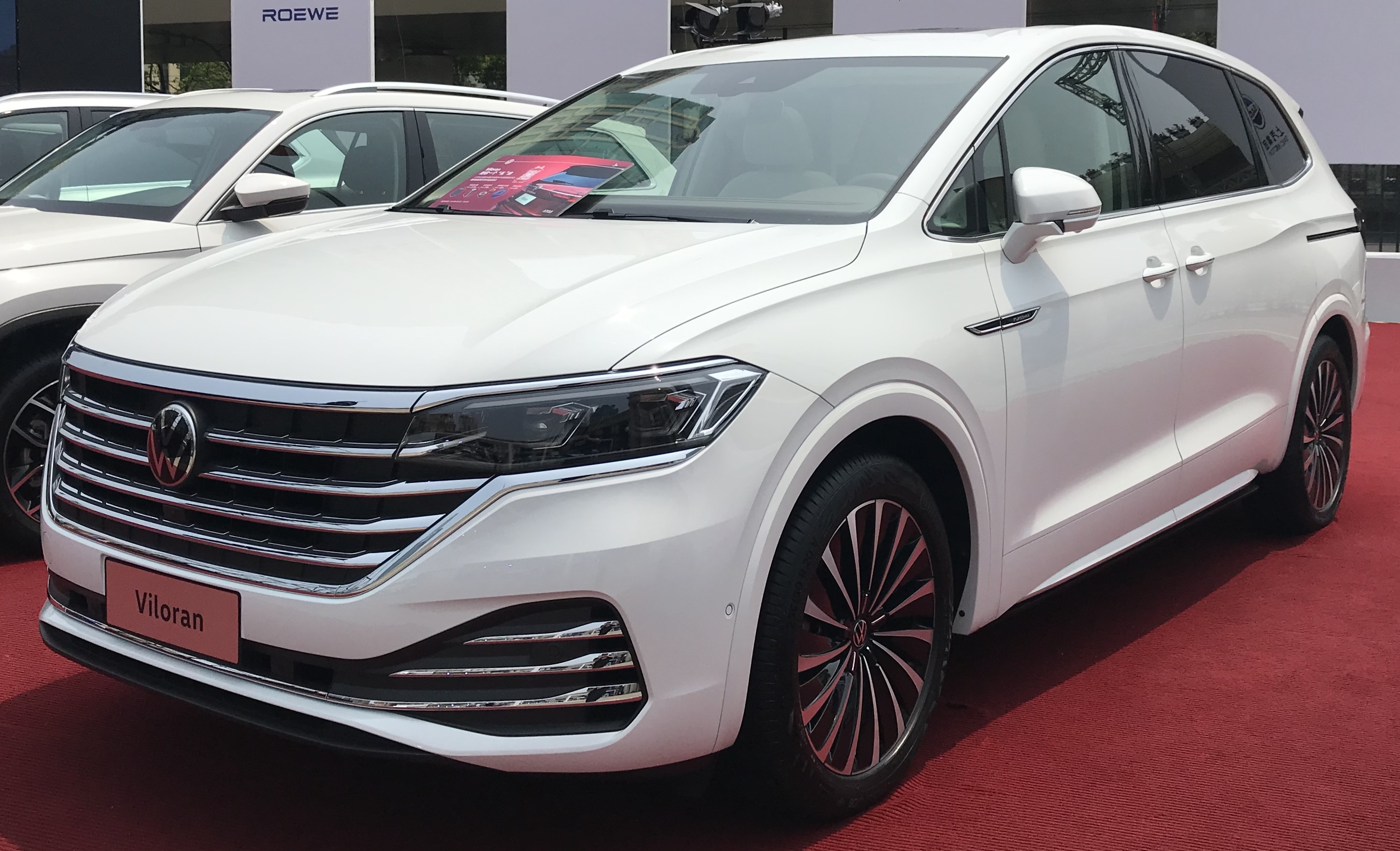
Volkswagen Viloran

== MQB Evo (2019) ==
- Audi A3 Mk4 (2020–present)
- Audi Q3 Mk3 (2025–present)
  - Audi Q3 Sportback Mk2 (2025–present)
- Audi Q6 (2022–present)
- Cupra Formentor (2021–present)
- Cupra Terramar (2024–present)
- Jetta VS8 (2025–present)
- SEAT León Mk4 (2020–present)
- Škoda Superb Mk4 (2023–present)
- Škoda Octavia Mk4 (2020–present)
- Škoda Kodiaq Mk2 (2023–present)
- Volkswagen Atlas/Teramont Pro Mk2 (2025–present)
- Volkswagen Caddy Mk4 (2020–present)
  - Ford Tourneo Connect Mk3 (2022–present)
- Volkswagen Golf Mk8 (2019–present)
- Volkswagen Lamando L (2022–present)
- Volkswagen Lavida Pro (2025–present)
- Volkswagen Multivan (T7) (2022–present)
- Volkswagen Passat/Magotan/Passat Pro (B9) (2023–present)
- Volkswagen Sagitar L (2025–present)
- Volkswagen Talagon (2021–present)
- Volkswagen Tavendor (2022–present)
- Volkswagen Tiguan Mk3 (2023–present)
- Volkswagen Tayron Mk2 (2024–present)
- Volkswagen T-Roc Mk2 (2025–present)
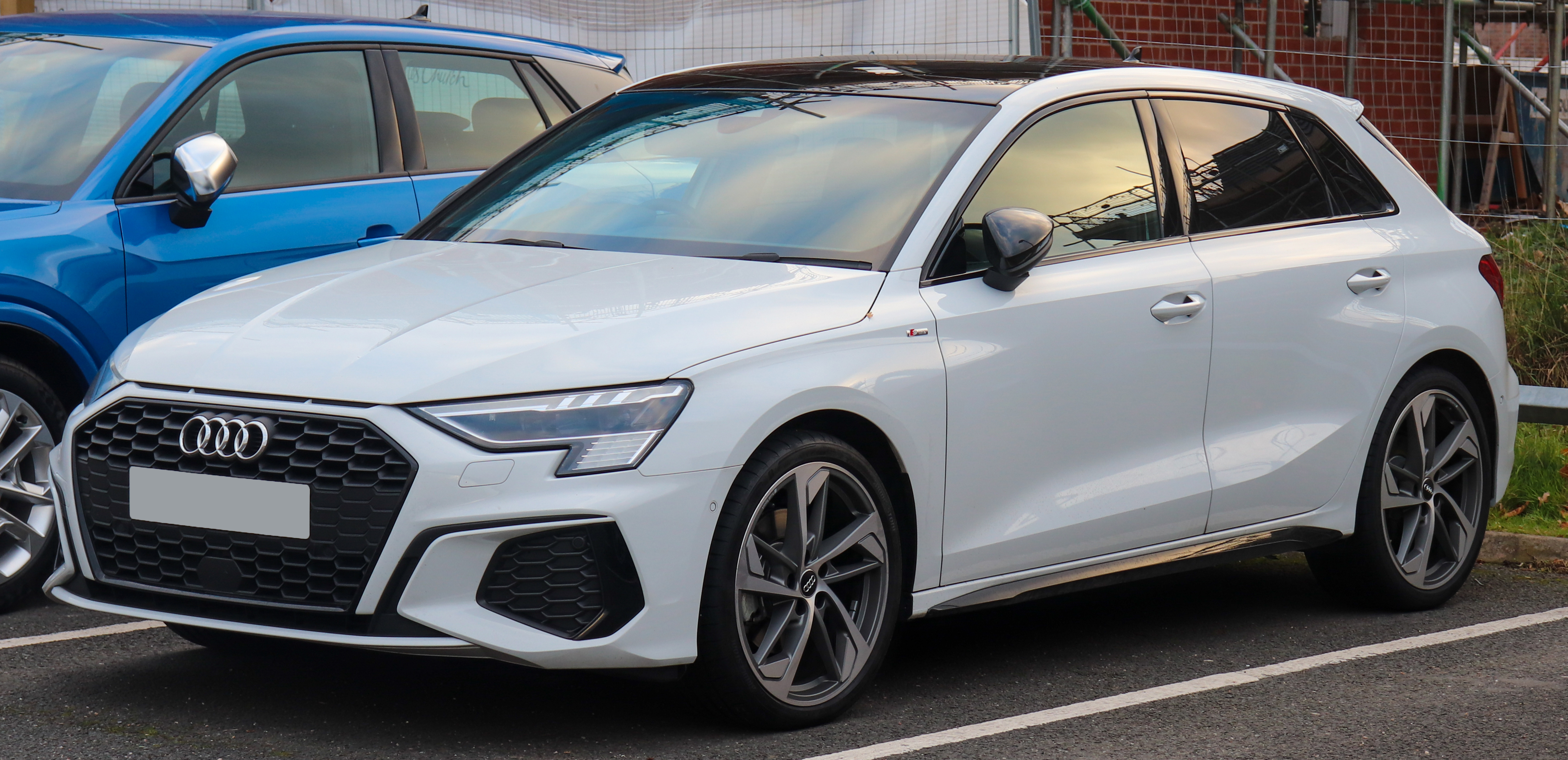
Audi A3

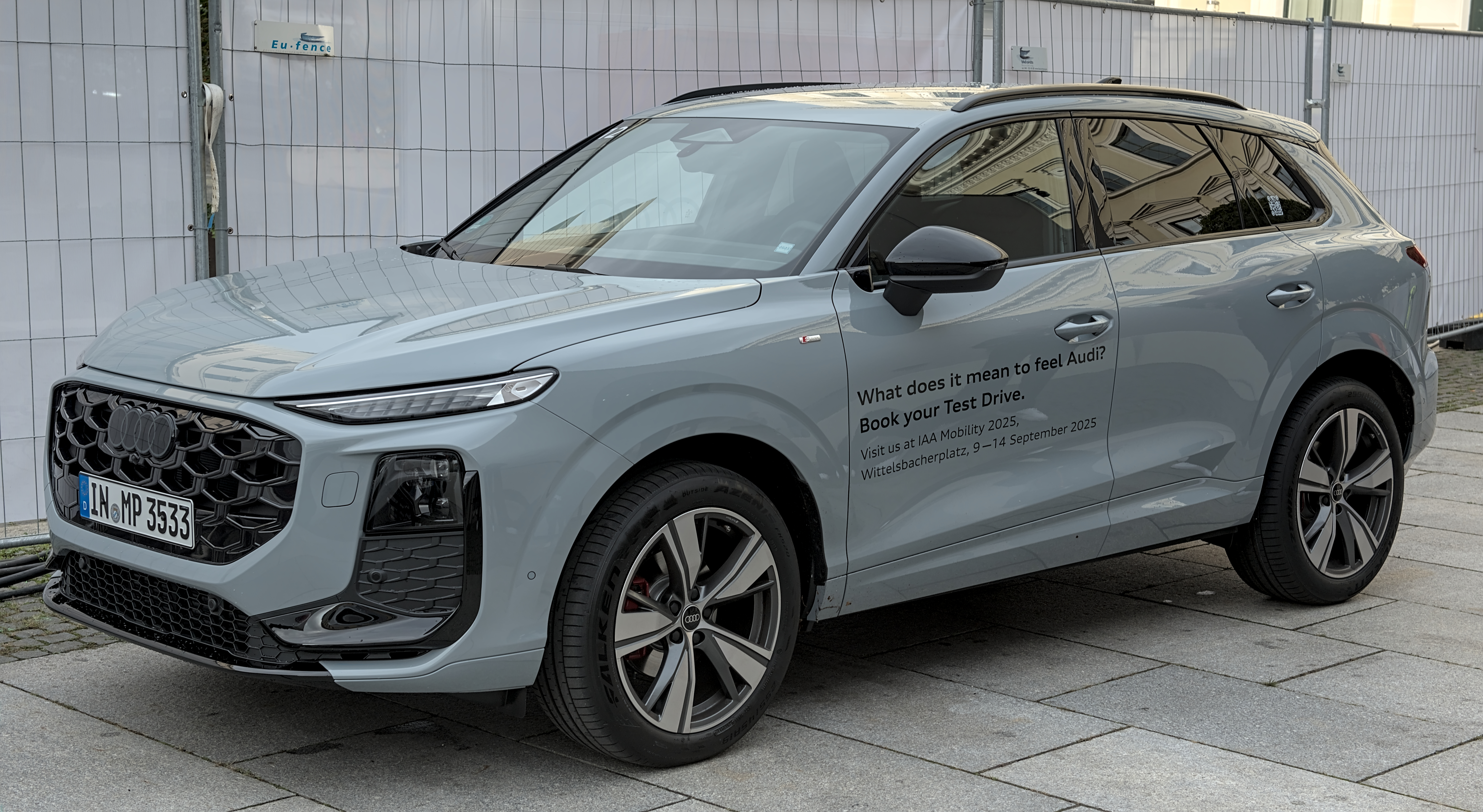
Audi Q3

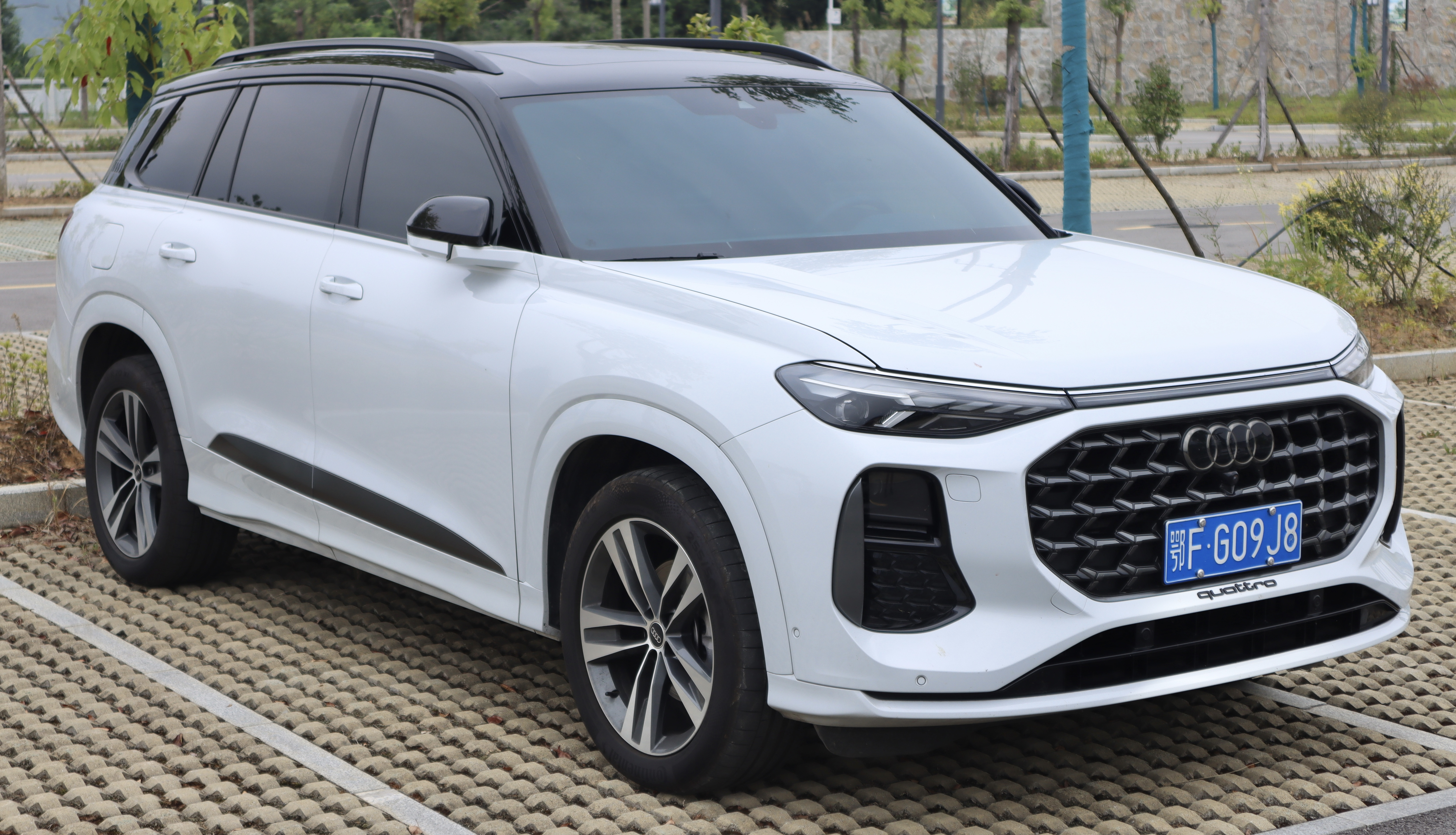
Audi Q6

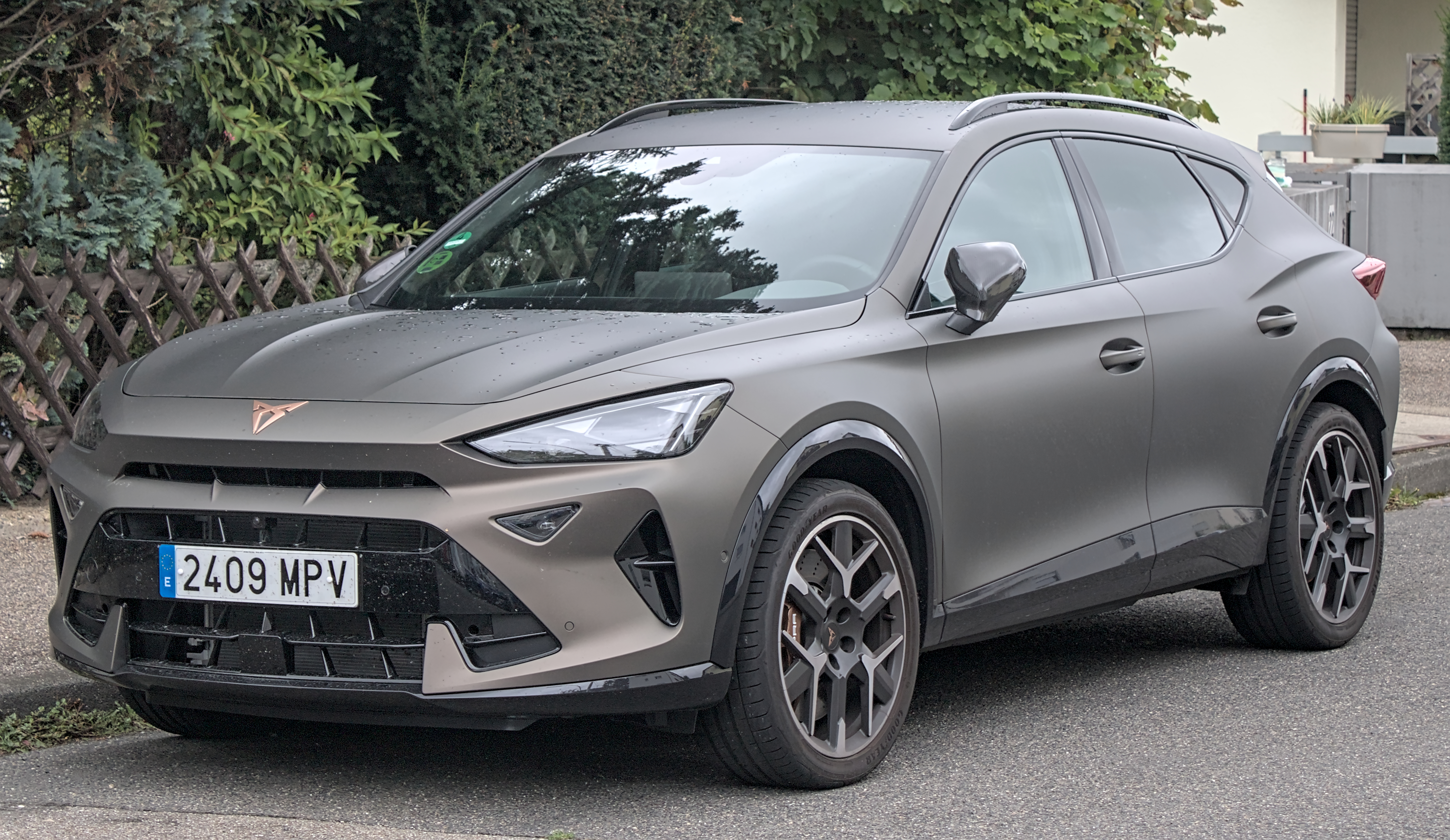
Cupra Formentor

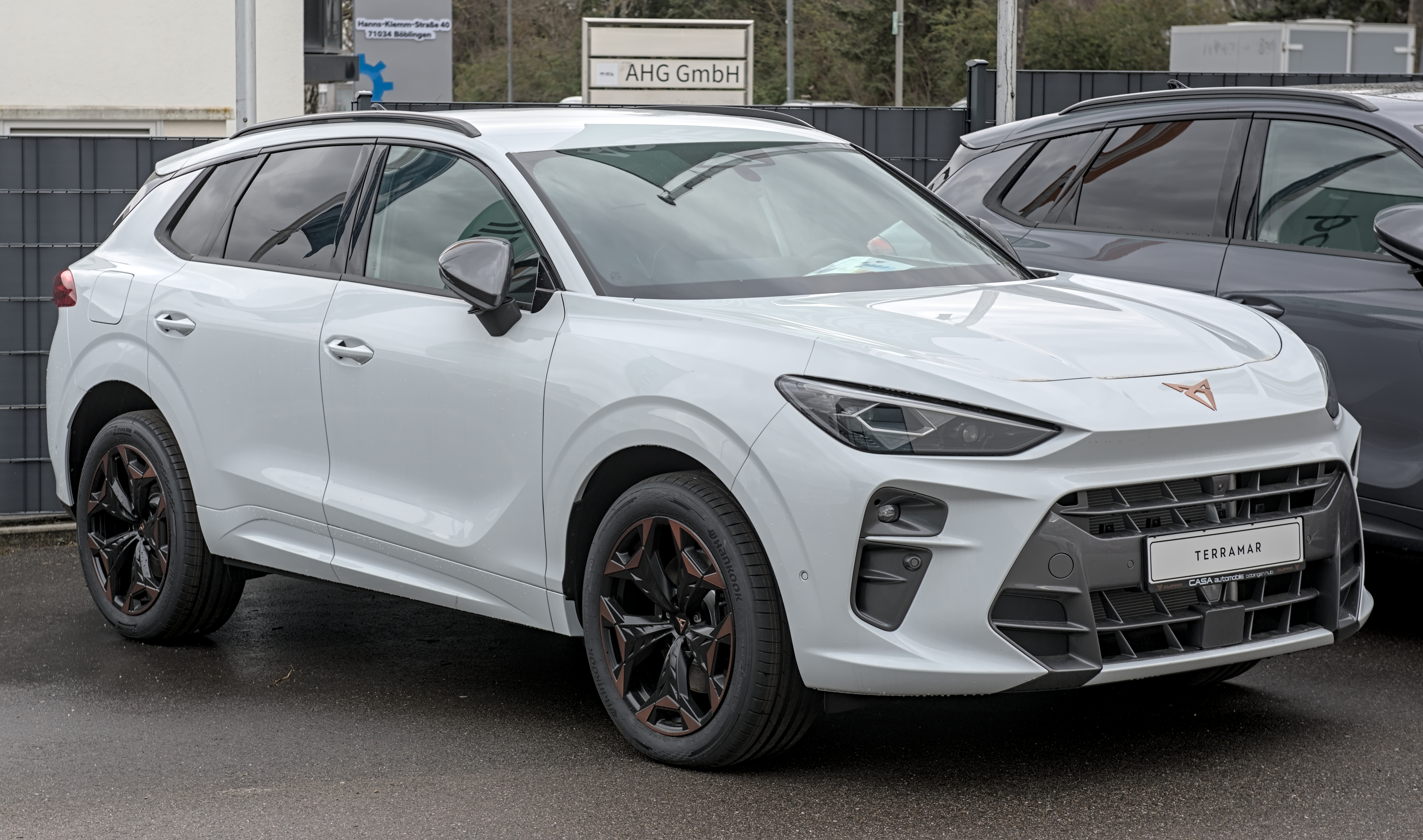
Cupra Terramar

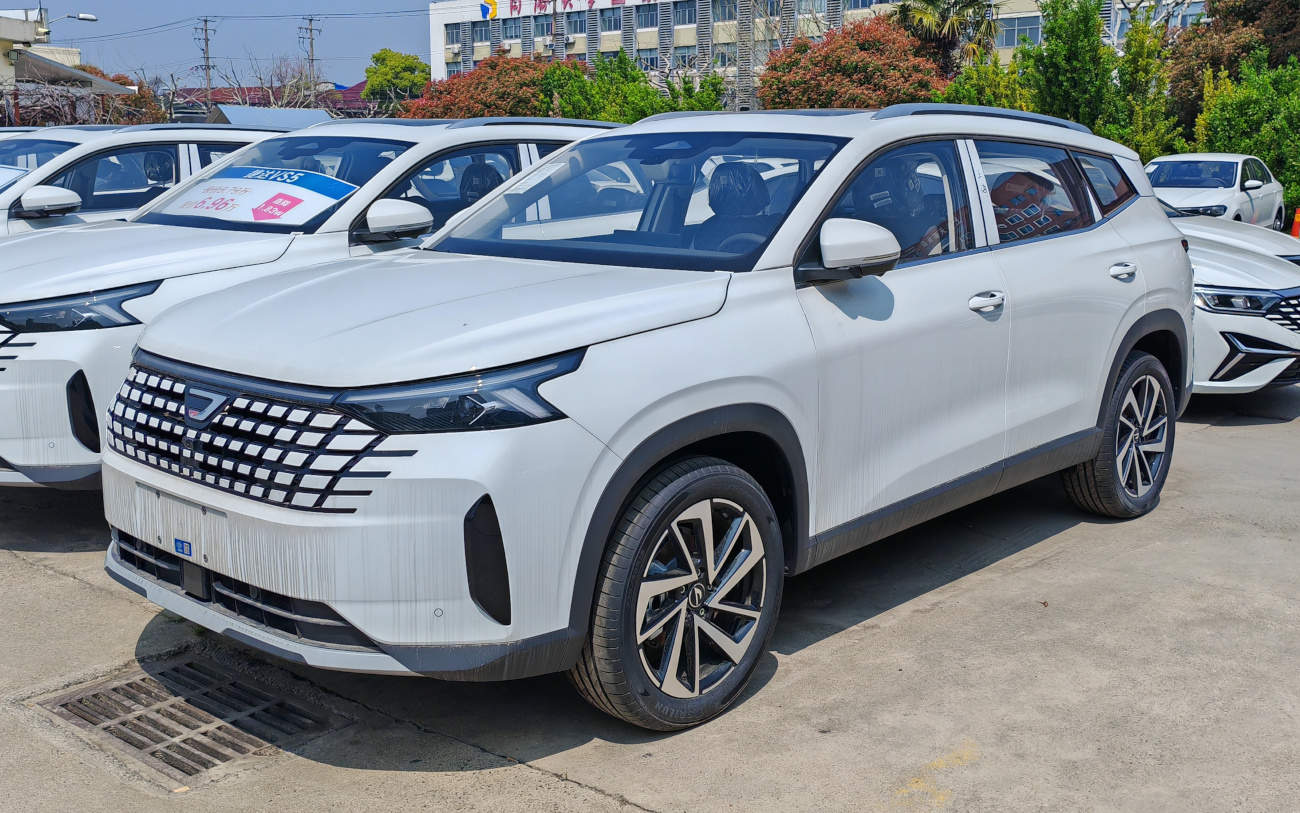
Jetta VS8

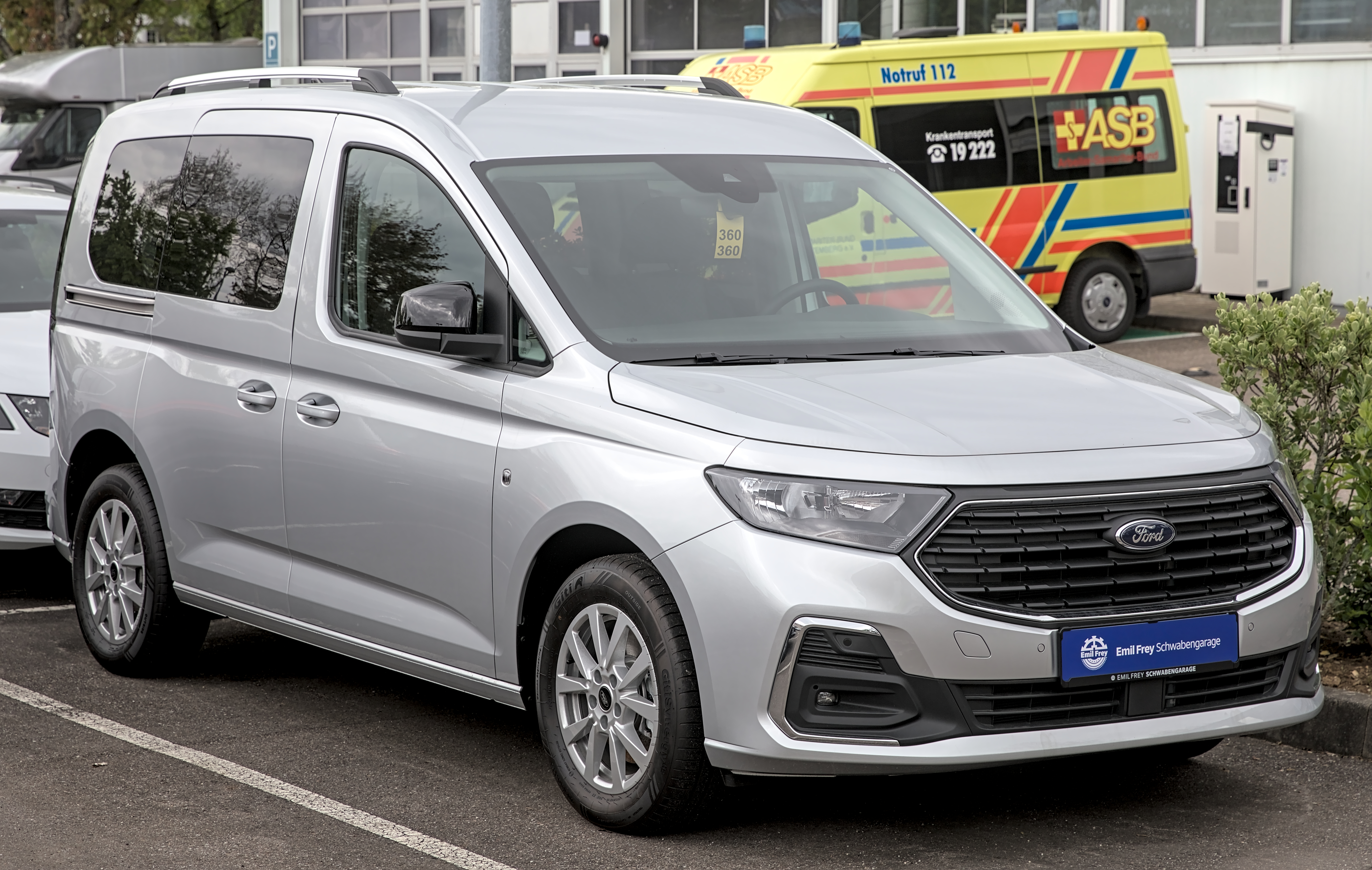
Ford Tourneo Connect

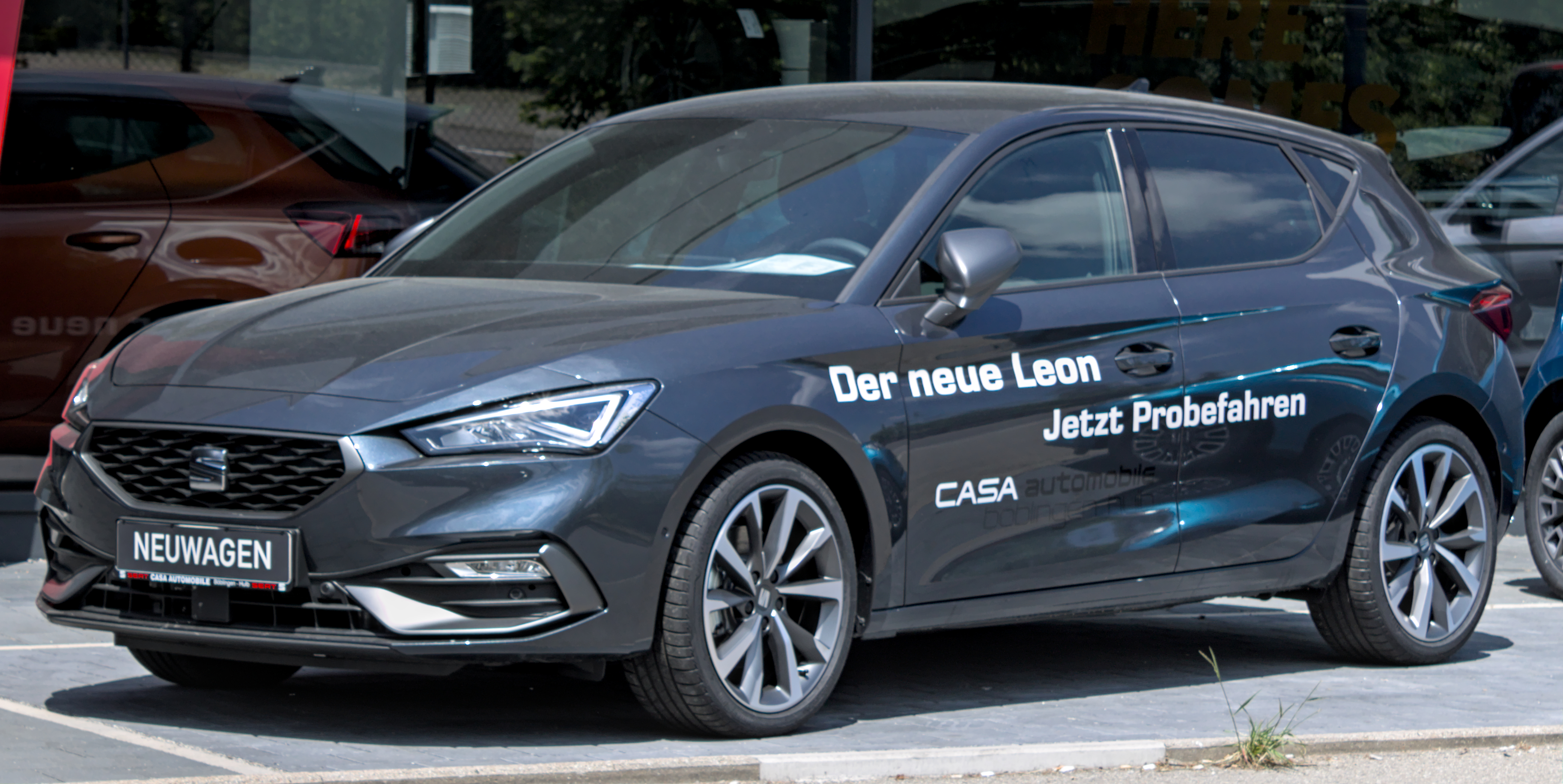
SEAT Leon

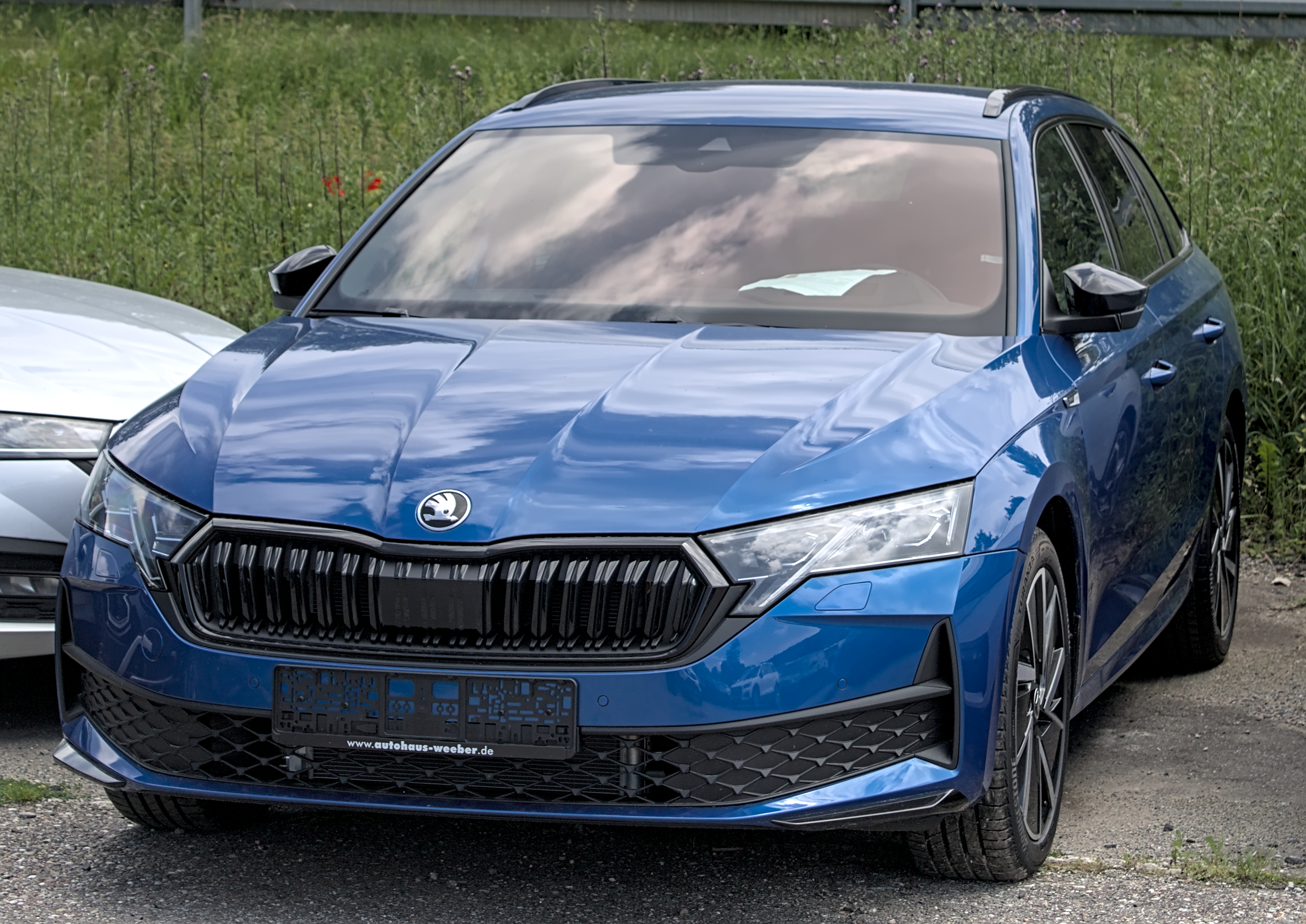
Škoda Octavia

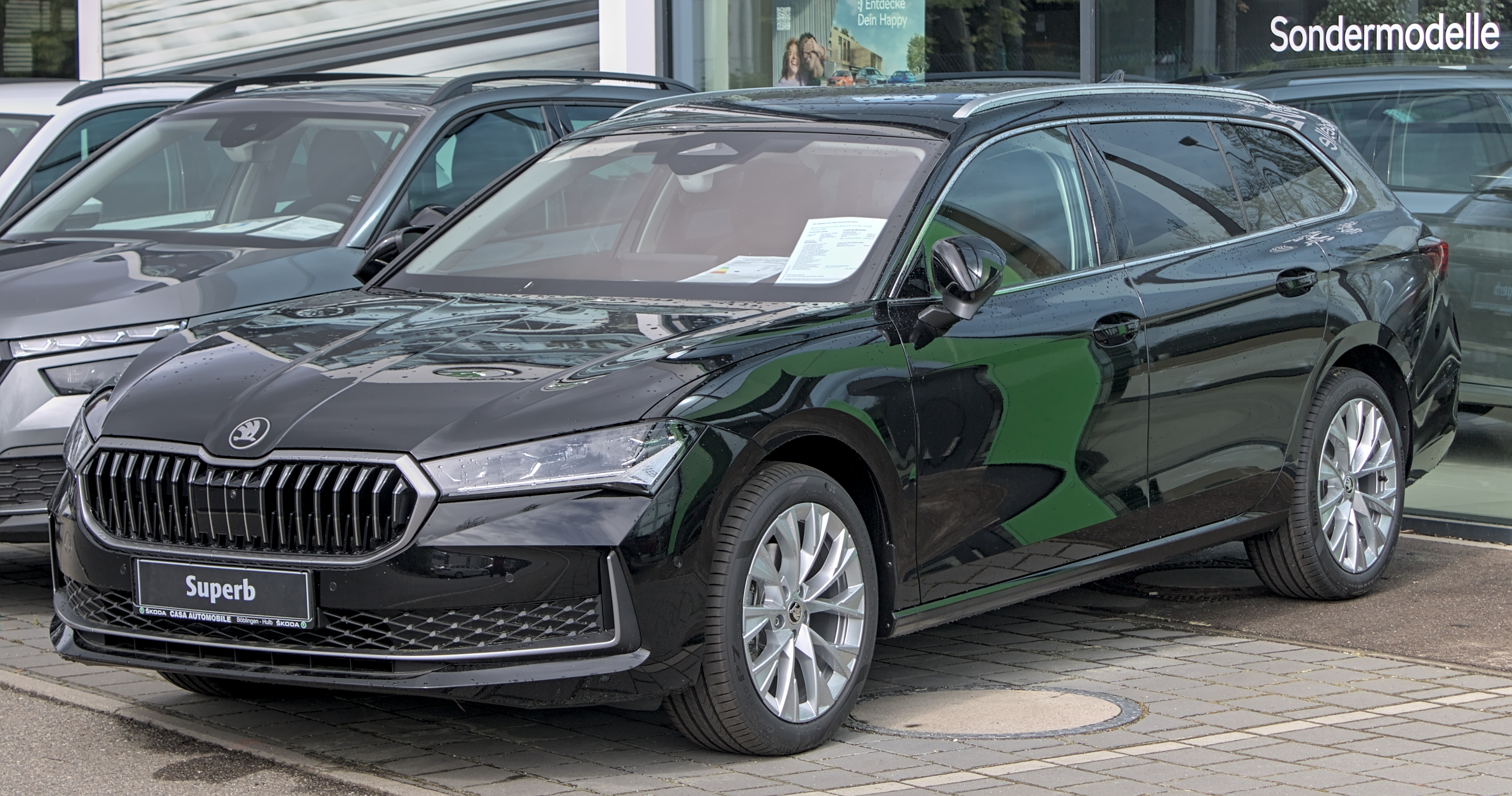
Škoda Superb

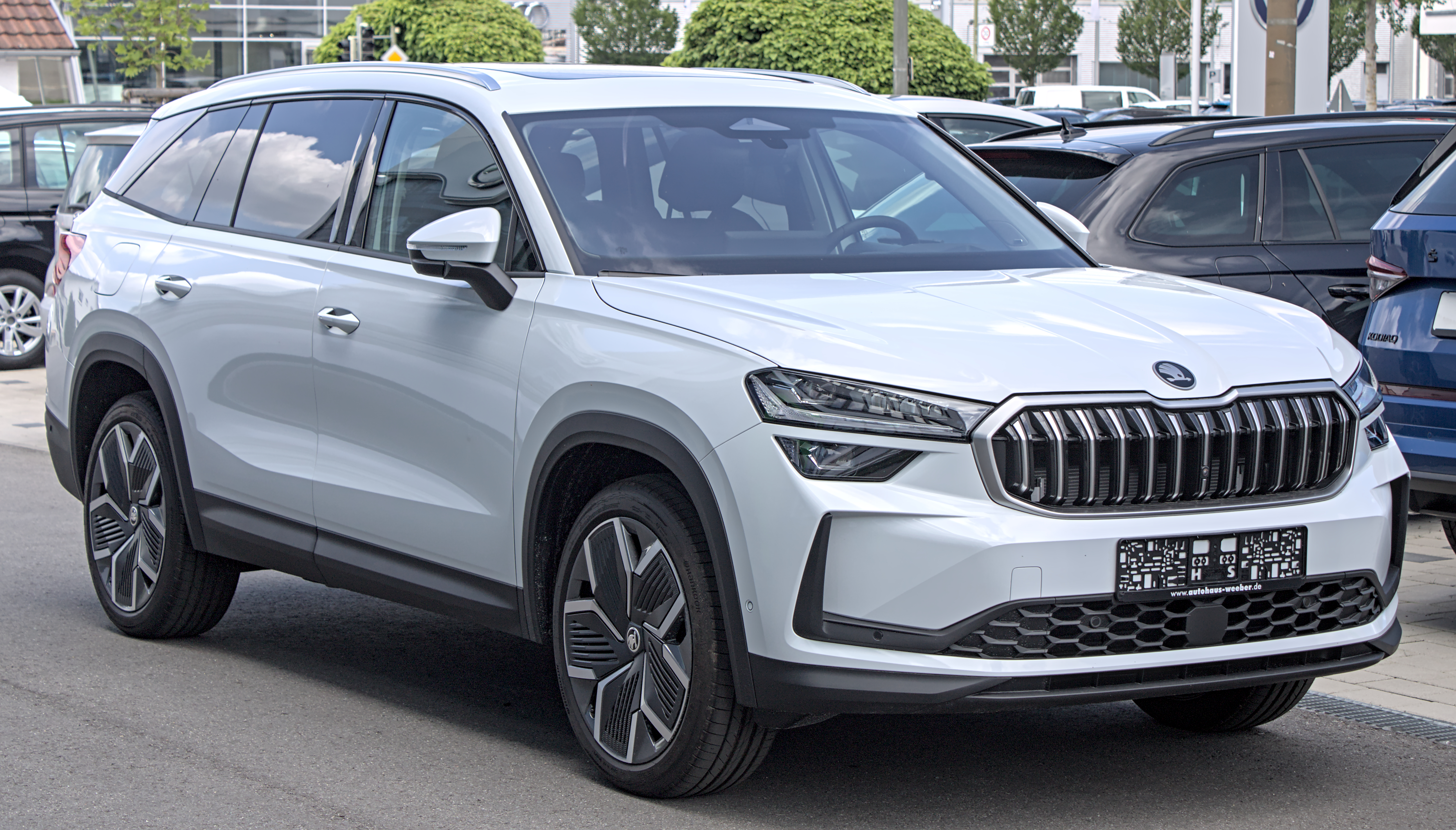
Škoda Kodiaq

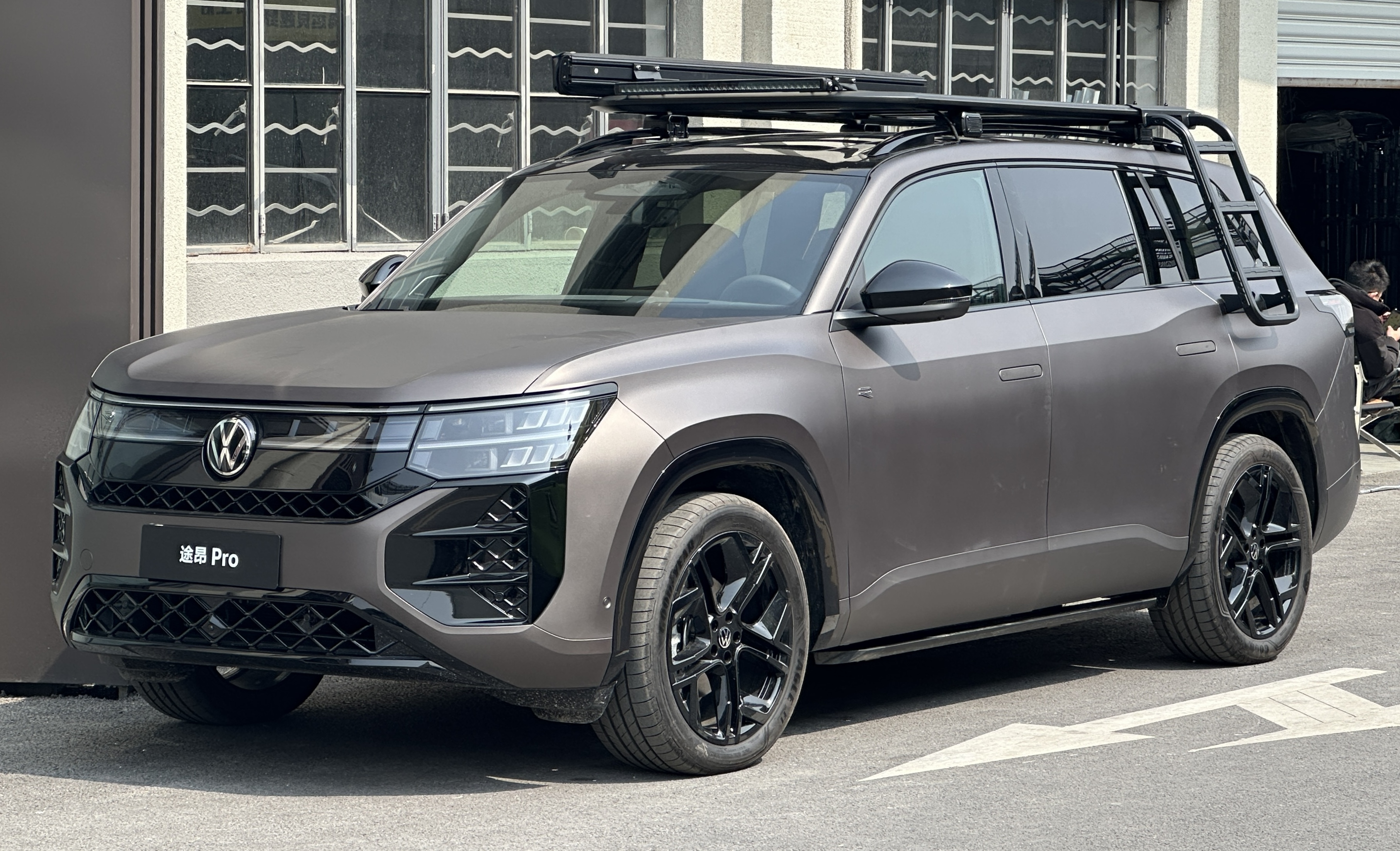
Volkswagen Atlas

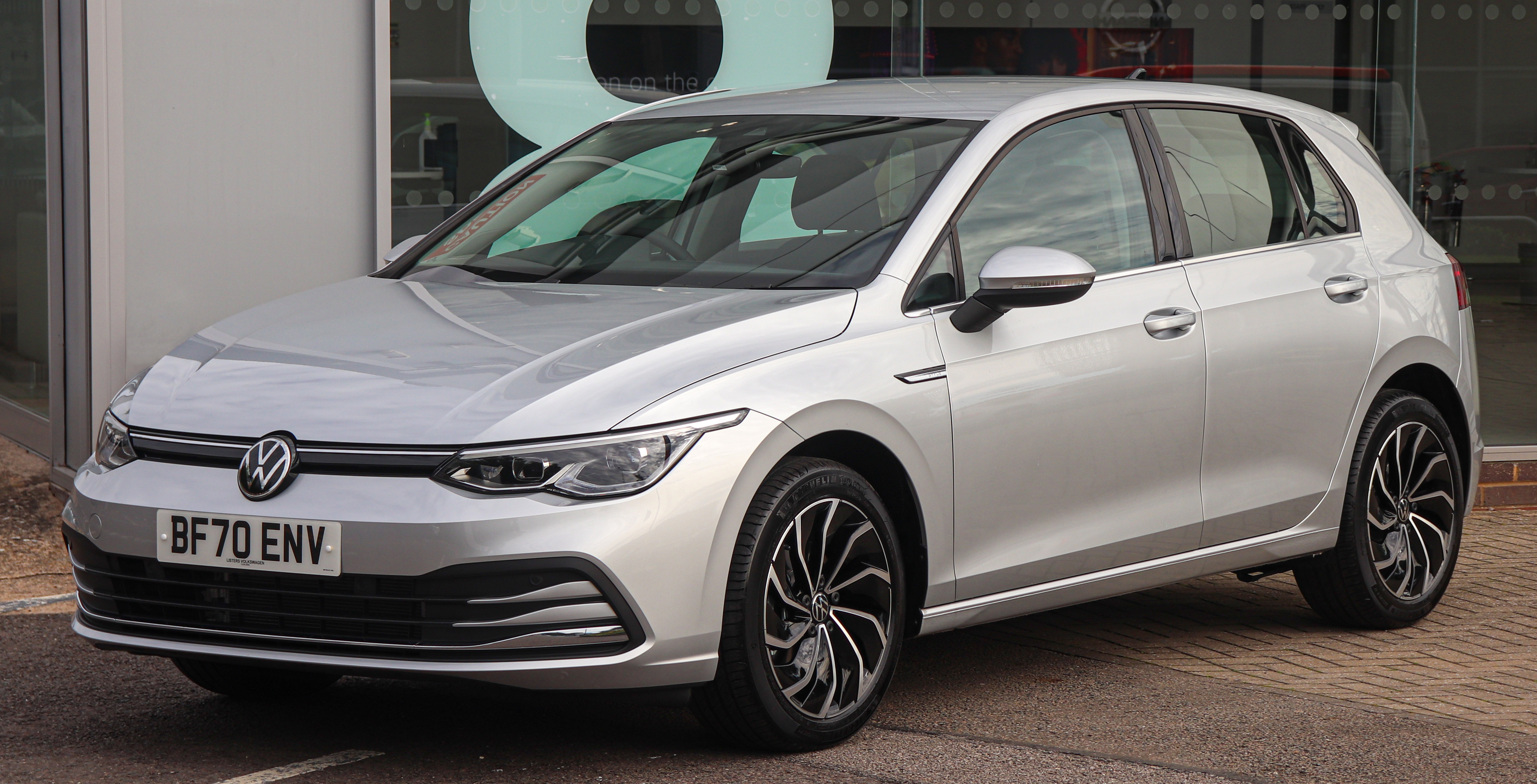
Volkswagen Golf

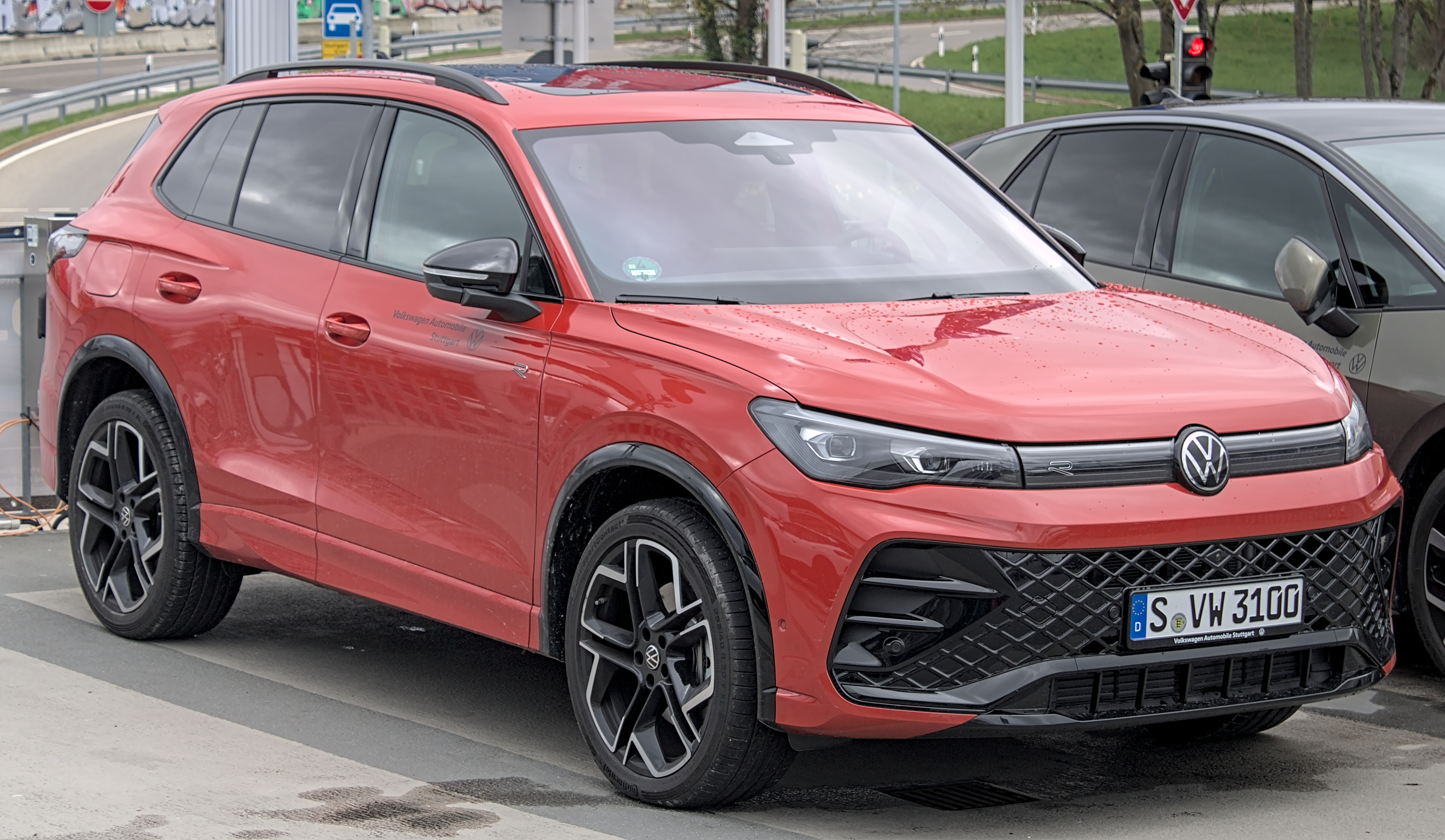
Volkswagen Tiguan

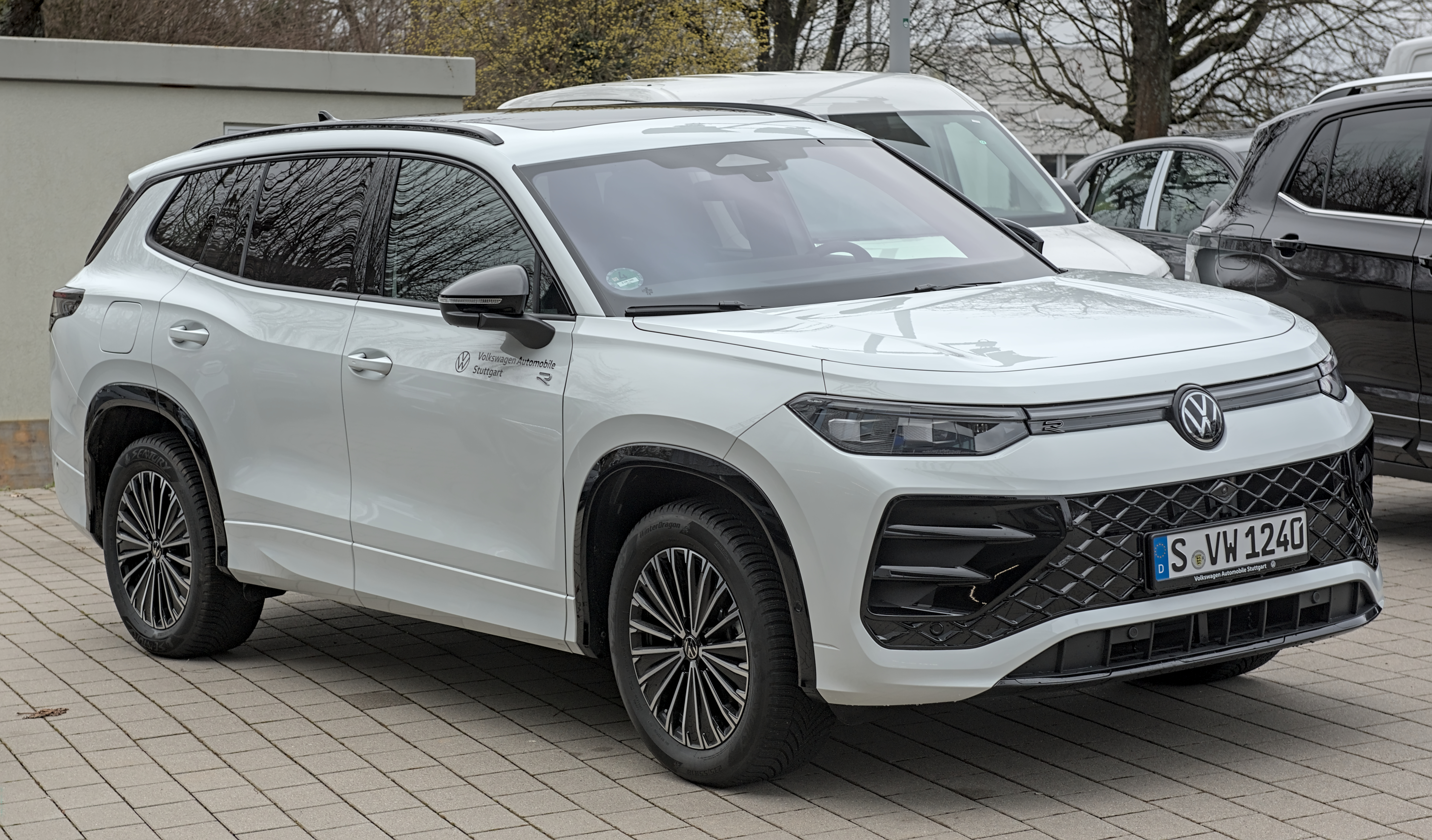
Volkswagen Tayron

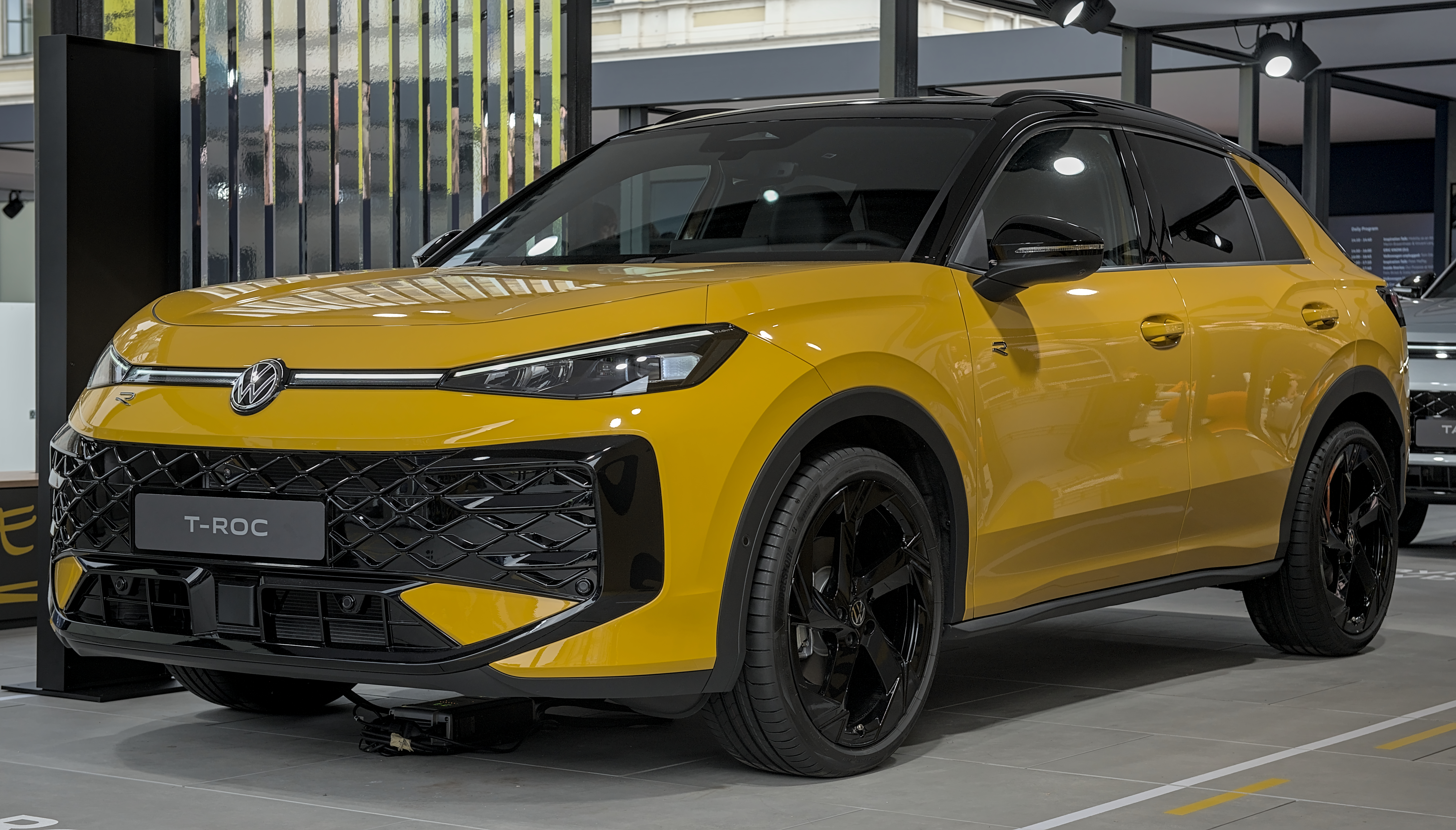
Volkswagen T-Roc

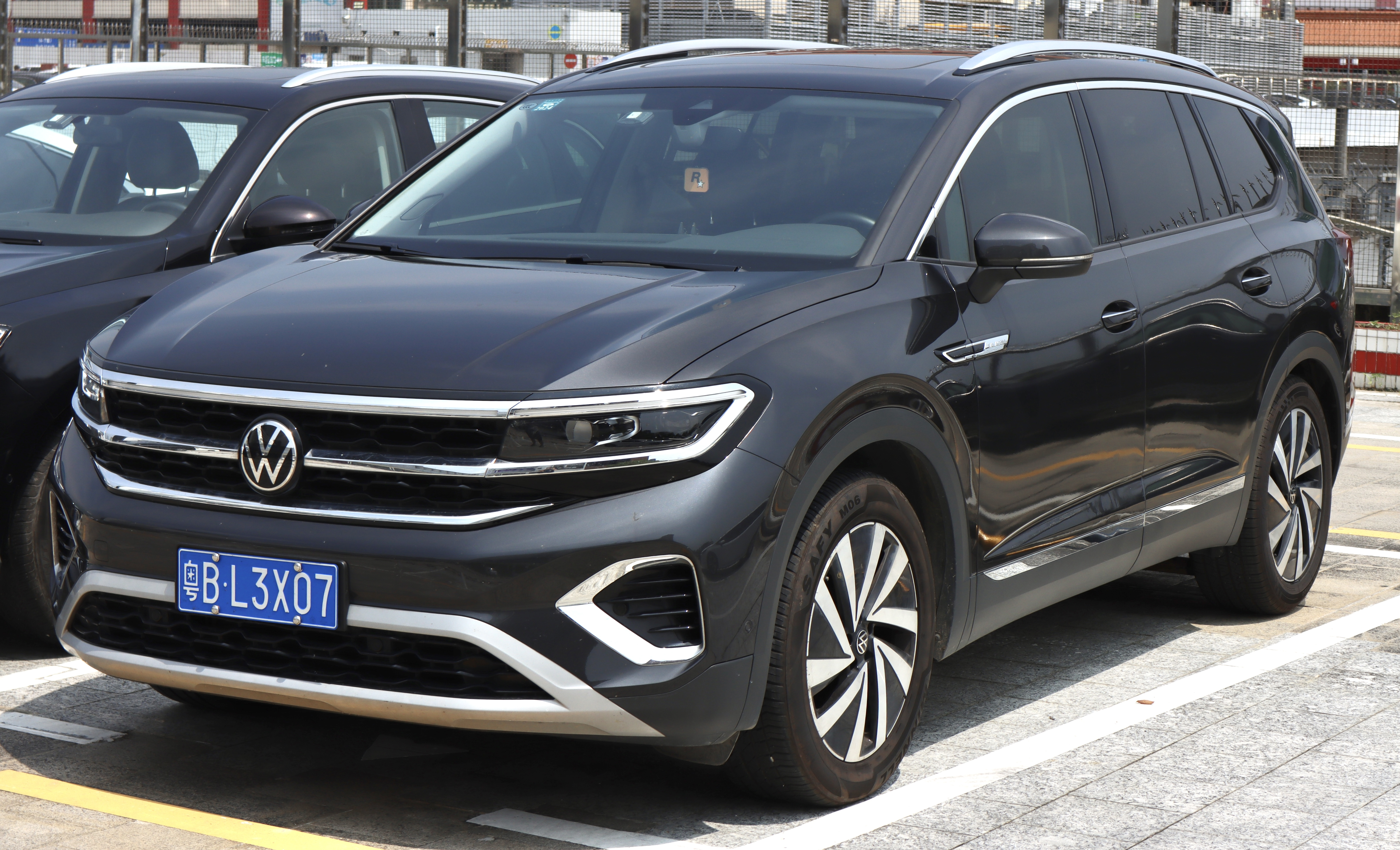
Volkswagen Talagon

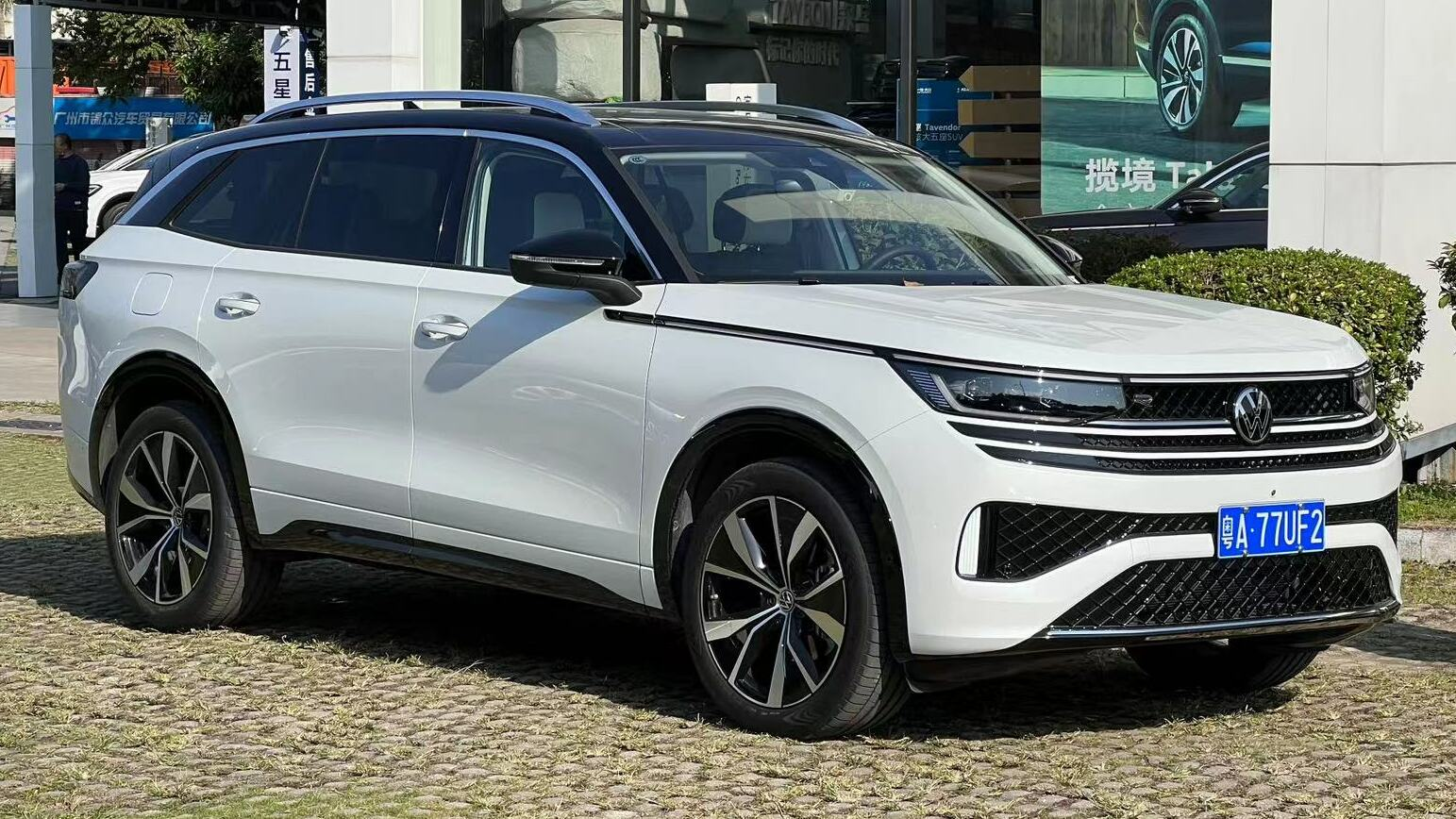
Volkswagen Tavendor

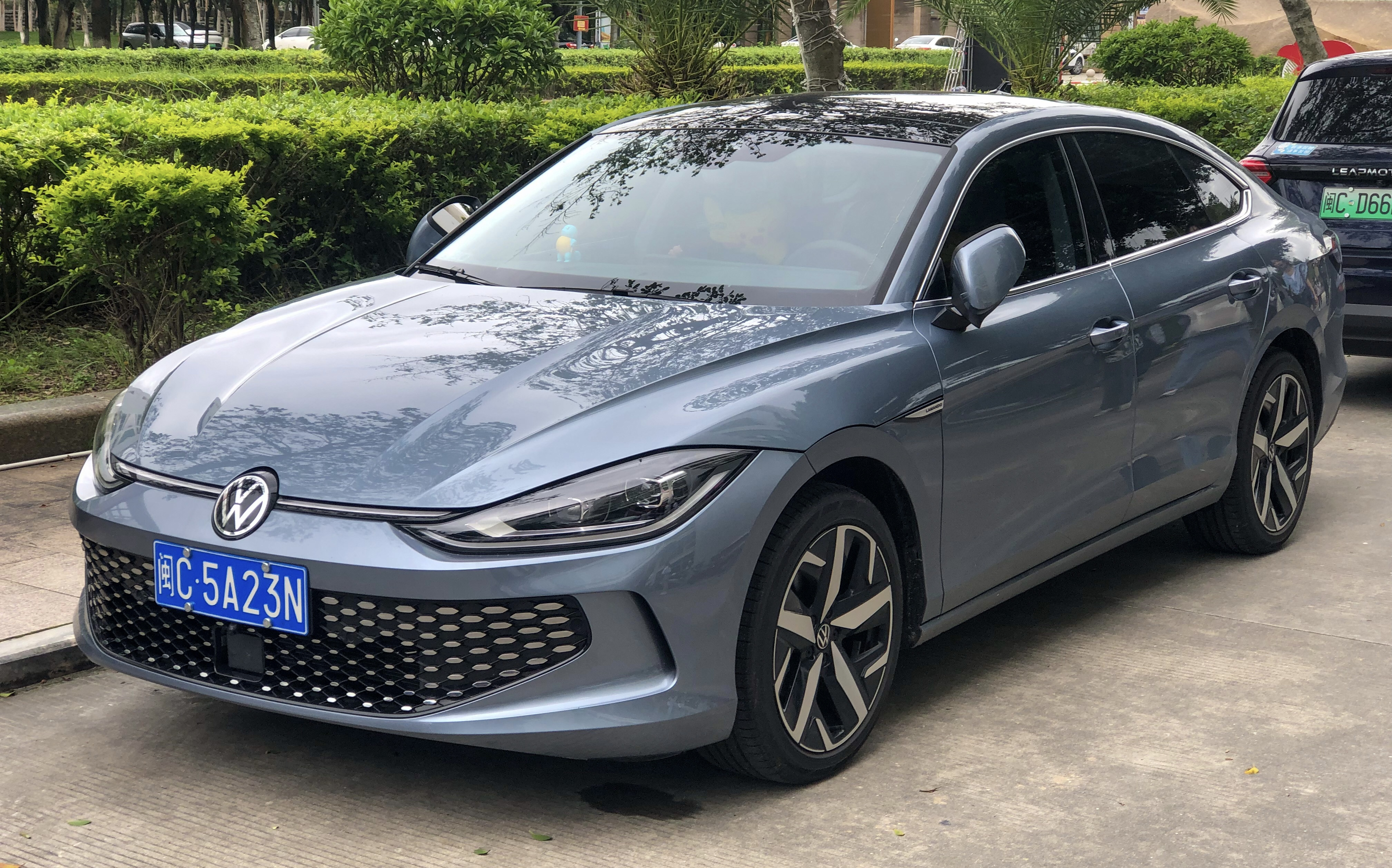
Volkswagen Lamando L

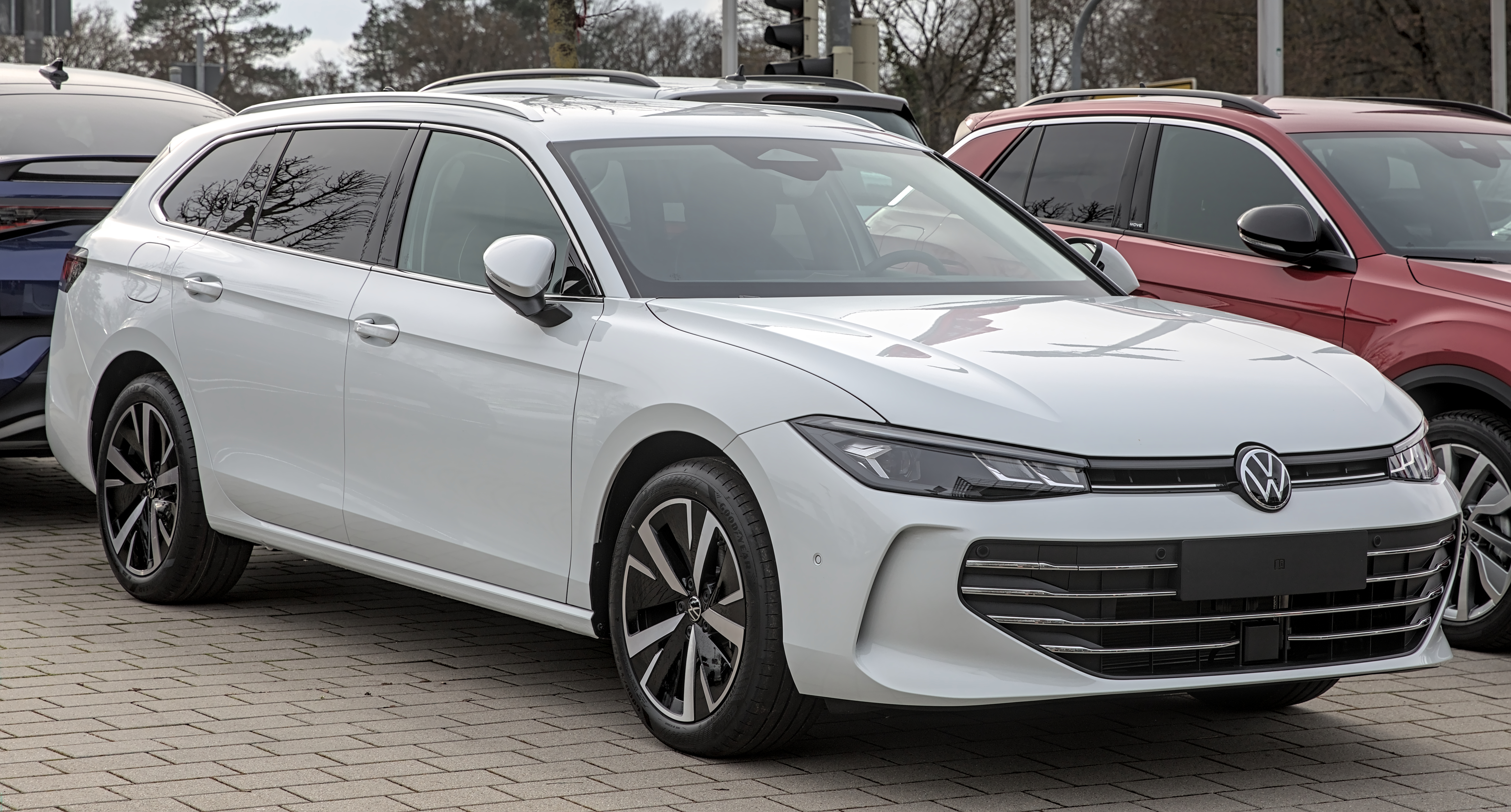
Volkswagen Passat (B9)

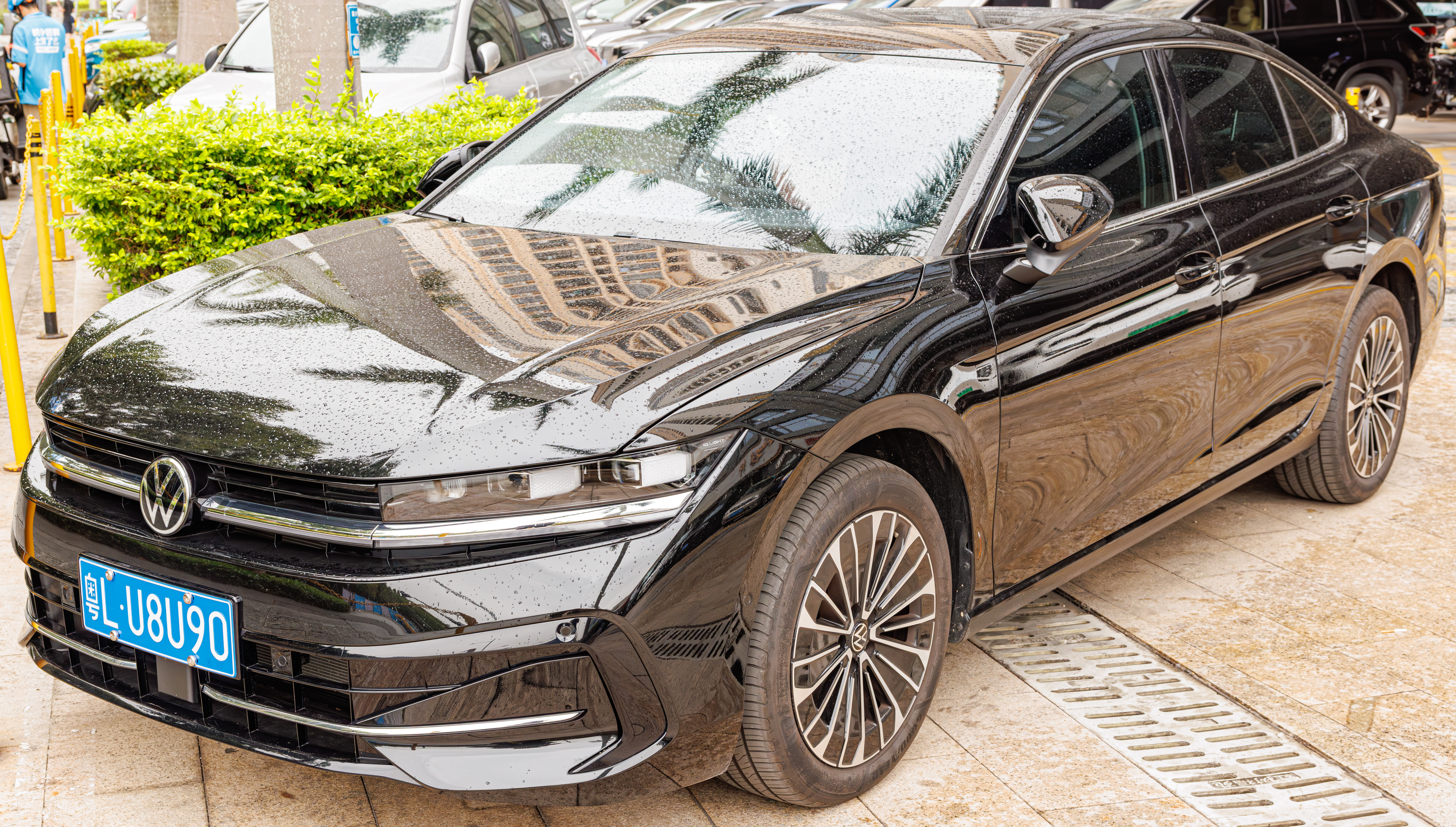
Volkswagen Magotan (B9)

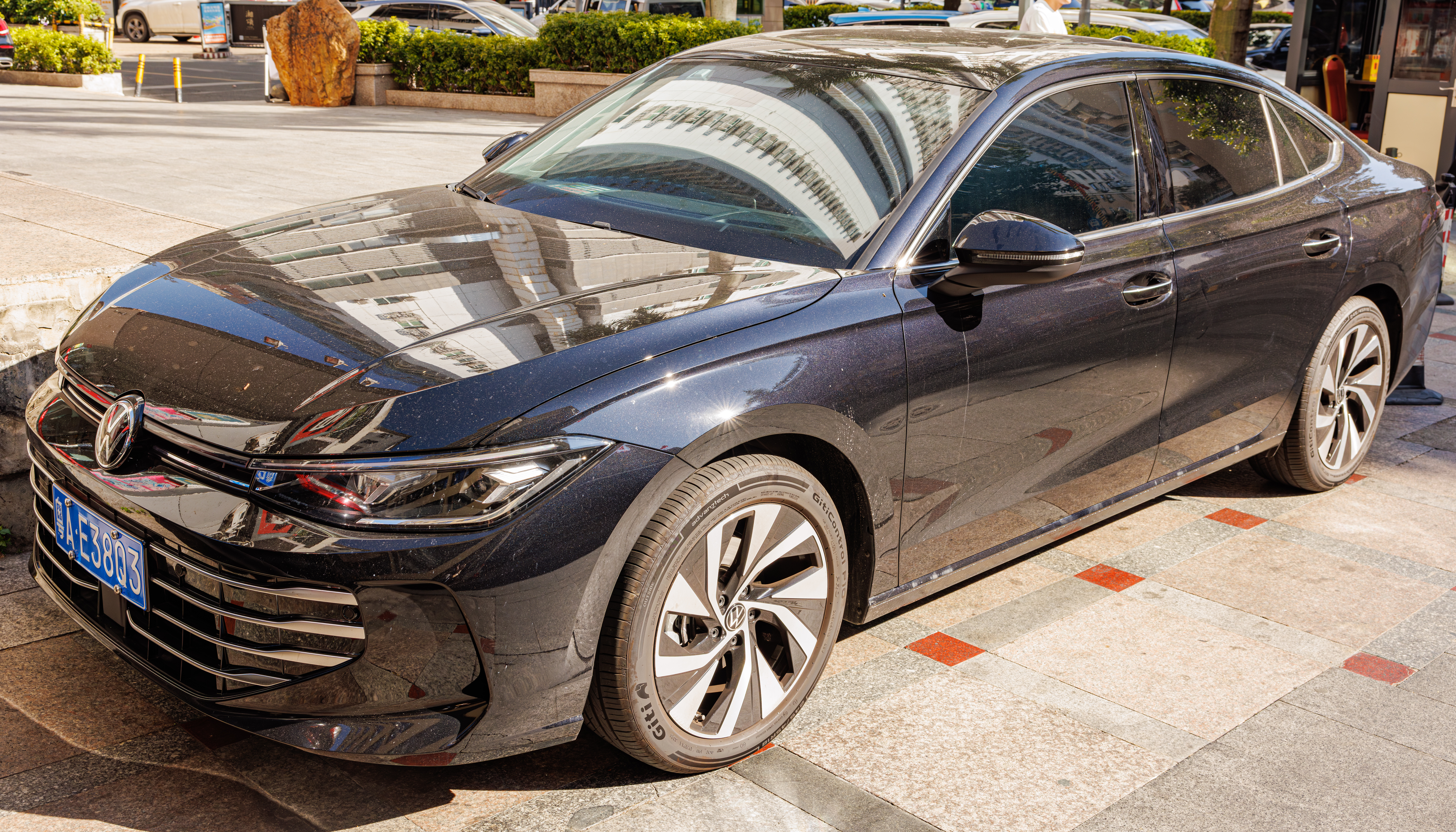
Volkswagen Passat Pro (B9)

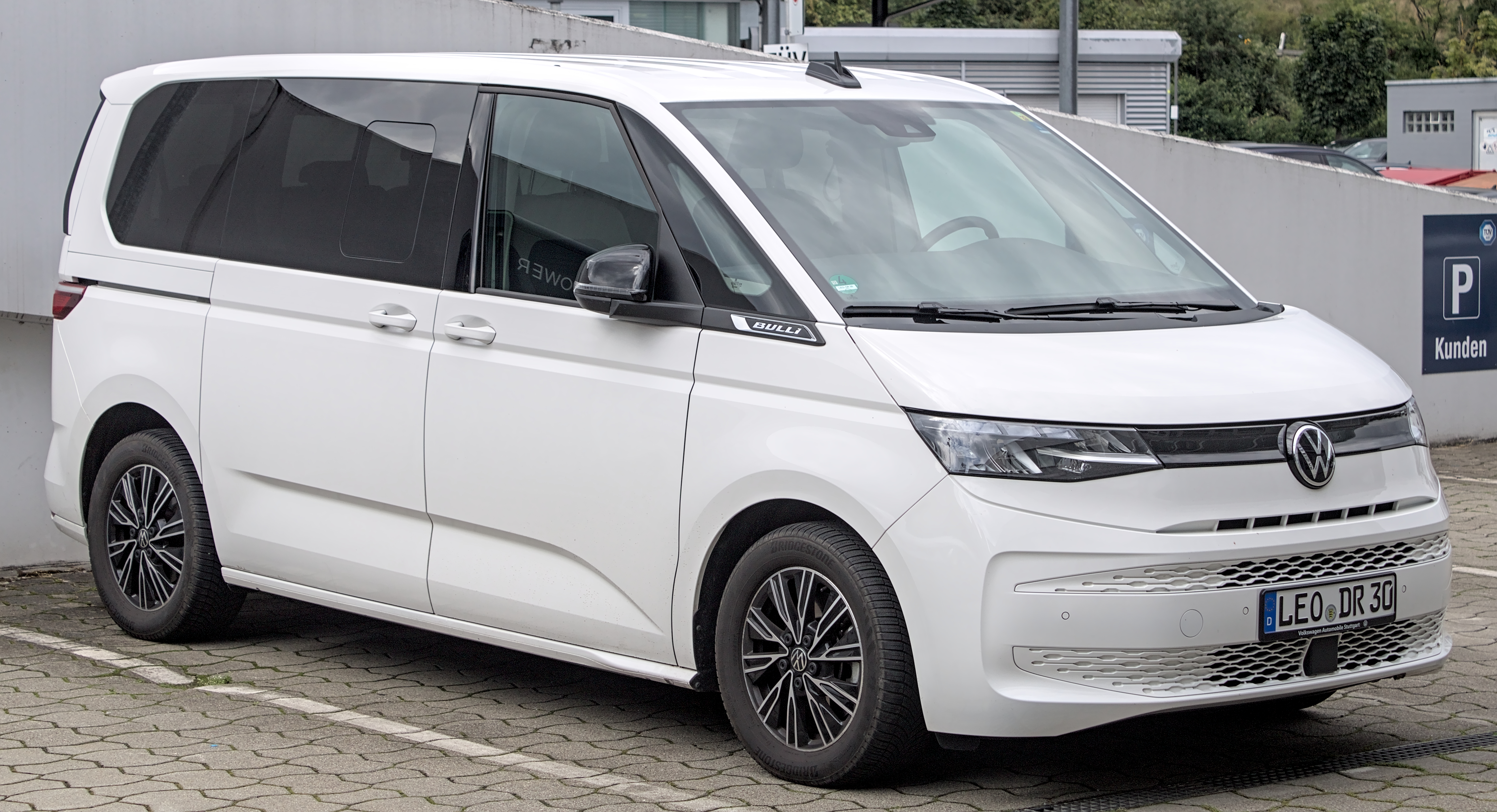
Volkswagen Multivan (T7)

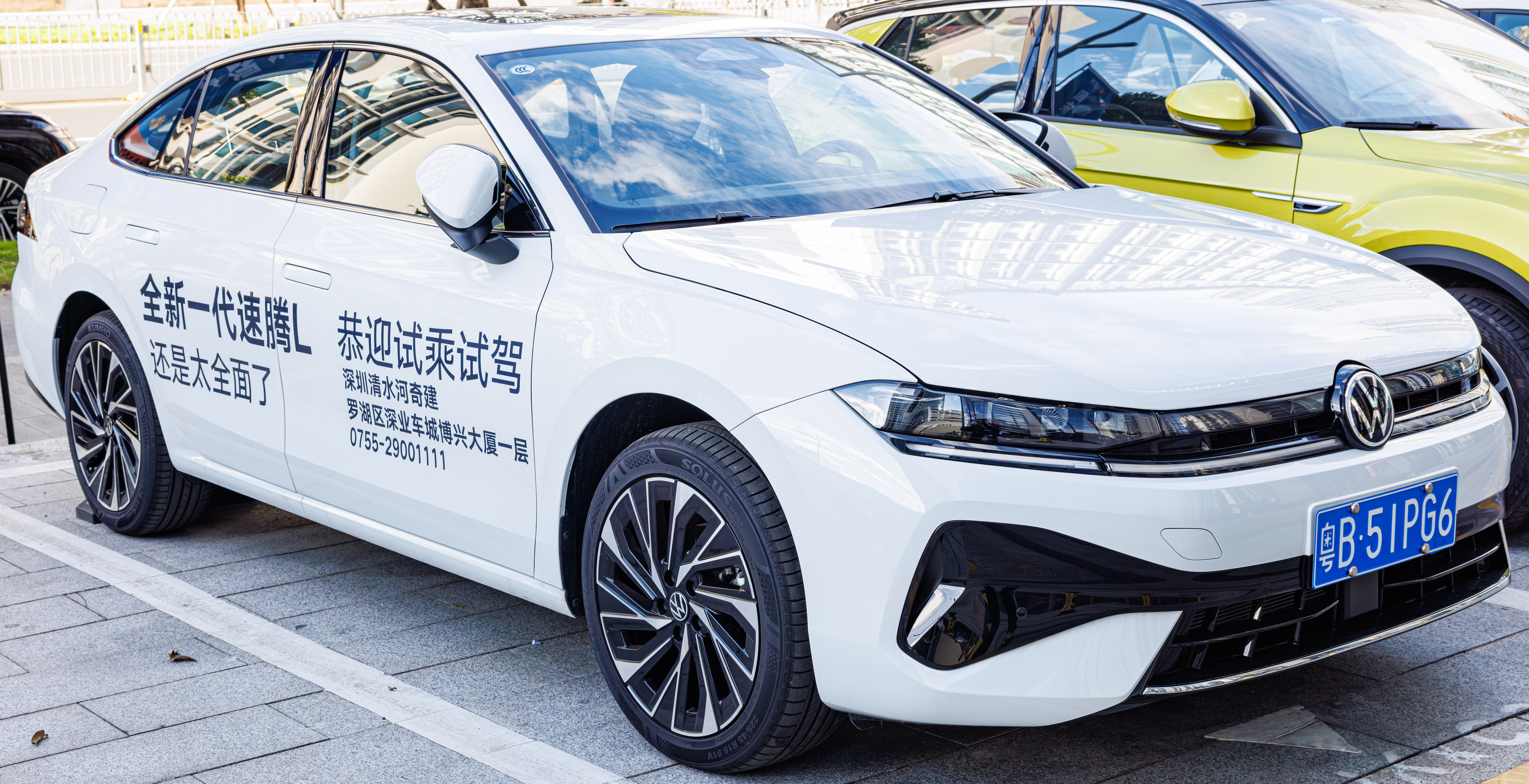
Volkswagen Sagitar L

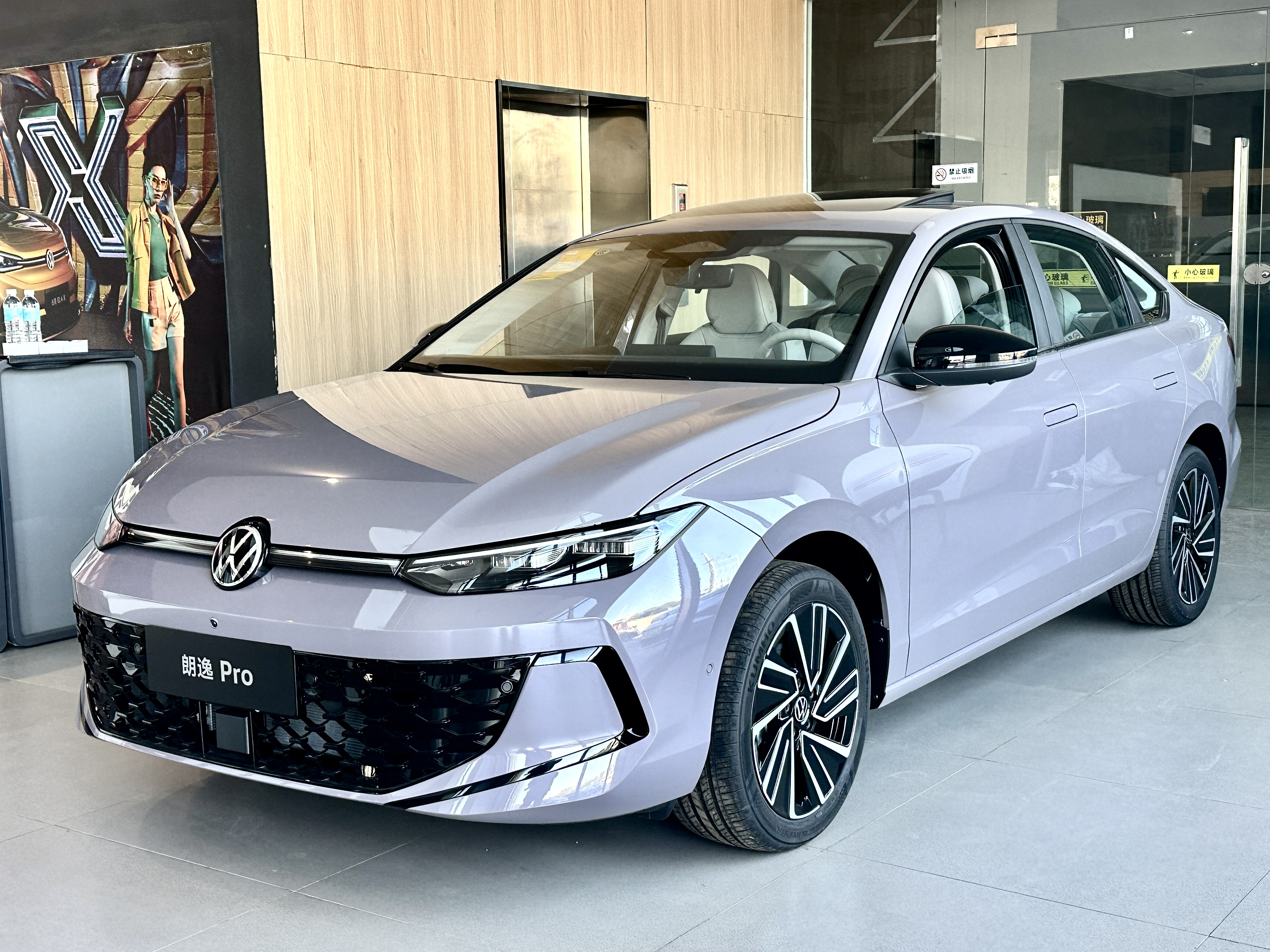
Volkswagen Lavida Pro

== See also ==
- Volkswagen Group MLB platform
- Volkswagen Group MSB platform
- Volkswagen Group MEB platform
- Volkswagen Group Premium Platform Combustion
- Volkswagen Group New Small Family platform
- List of Volkswagen Group platforms
