= Kodiak =

Kodiak may refer to:

== Places ==
- Kodiak, Alaska, a city located on Kodiak island
- Kodiak, Missouri, an unincorporated community
- Kodiak Archipelago, in southern Alaska
- Kodiak Island, the largest island of the Kodiak archipelago
  - Kodiak Launch Complex, a commercial spaceport on Kodiak Island
- Kodiak Island Borough, Alaska, a borough mostly located on the island
- Kodiak National Wildlife Refuge, a wilderness area in the Kodiak Archipelago
- Kodiak Seamount, the oldest seamount of the Kodiak-Bowie Seamount chain

== Arts, entertainment, and media ==
- Kodiak (TV series), a television program set in Alaska that aired Fridays on ABC, during the 1974-75 television season in the United States
- Kodiak or GDSS Kodiak, a large spaceship in the second and fourth video games of the Command & Conquer: Tiberian series
- Kodiak, a combat unit ("mech") in the MechWarrior 2: 31st Century Combat Ghost Bear expansion
- Kodi (full name: Kodiak), a fictional character in Balto III: Wings of Change
- Kodiak, a 2010 IDW Publishing comic book
- Kodiak Empire, a progressive rock band from Brisbane, Australia.

== Vehicles ==
- AEV 3 Kodiak a Swiss armoured engineer vehicle
- Kodiak, a whaling steamer
- Kodiak, an all-terrain vehicle manufactured by Yamaha Motor Company
- Chevrolet Kodiak, a line of large trucks sold by General Motors
- Quest Kodiak, a single turboprop STOL airplane by Quest Aircraft
- Škoda Kodiaq, an SUV
- Kodiak F1, a Concept car

== Other uses ==
- Kodiak (Boy Scouts of America), the second level leadership development course for Venturers in the Boy Scouts of America's Venturing program
- Kodiak bear (Ursus arctos middendorffi), also known as the Kodiak brown bear, sometimes the Alaskan brown bear
- Kodiak tobacco, a brand of dipping tobacco manufactured by American Snuff Company
- Mac OS X Public Beta, codenamed "Kodiak"
- Kodiak Cakes, a brand of flapjacks
- Kh-101, also known as AS-23 "Kodiak", a Russian air-launched cruise missile

== See also ==
- Kodak (disambiguation)
