= Kodak (disambiguation) =

Kodak is a maker of photo and printing products.

Kodak may also refer to:

== Places ==
- Kodak, Kentucky, an unincorporated community
- Kodak, Tennessee, an unincorporated community
- Kodak Peak, a mountain in Washington state

== Structures ==
- Kodak Fortress, a fort built in 1635 over the Dnieper River near modern-day Dnipro, Ukraine
- Kodak Tower, a skyscraper in Rochester, New York
- Dolby Theatre, formerly the Kodak Theatre, a theater in Los Angeles, California
- Eastman Business Park or Kodak Park, a manufacturing and industrial complex

== Other uses ==
- Kodak Black (born 1997), American rapper, singer, and songwriter
- kodak (poetry collection), a 1972 poetry collection by Patti Smith
- The Kodaks, an American doo-wop group on Lost Nite Records

== See also ==
- Kodak Park Railroad
- Kodaku people, an indigenous people living in India, in hills and forest of Chhotanagpur
- Kodiak (disambiguation)
