= CFX =

CFX may refer to:

- Central Florida Expressway Authority
- ANSYS CFX, a computation fluid dynamics program
- Xaverian Brothers or Congregation of St. Francis Xavier
- AMD CrossFireX, a computer graphics multiprocessing technology
- Compact form factor, a form factor of power supply unit (computer)
- Californium neutron flux multiplier
- CFexpress, a CompactFlash type of memory card
