= Jetta VS8 =

Mid-size crossover SUV

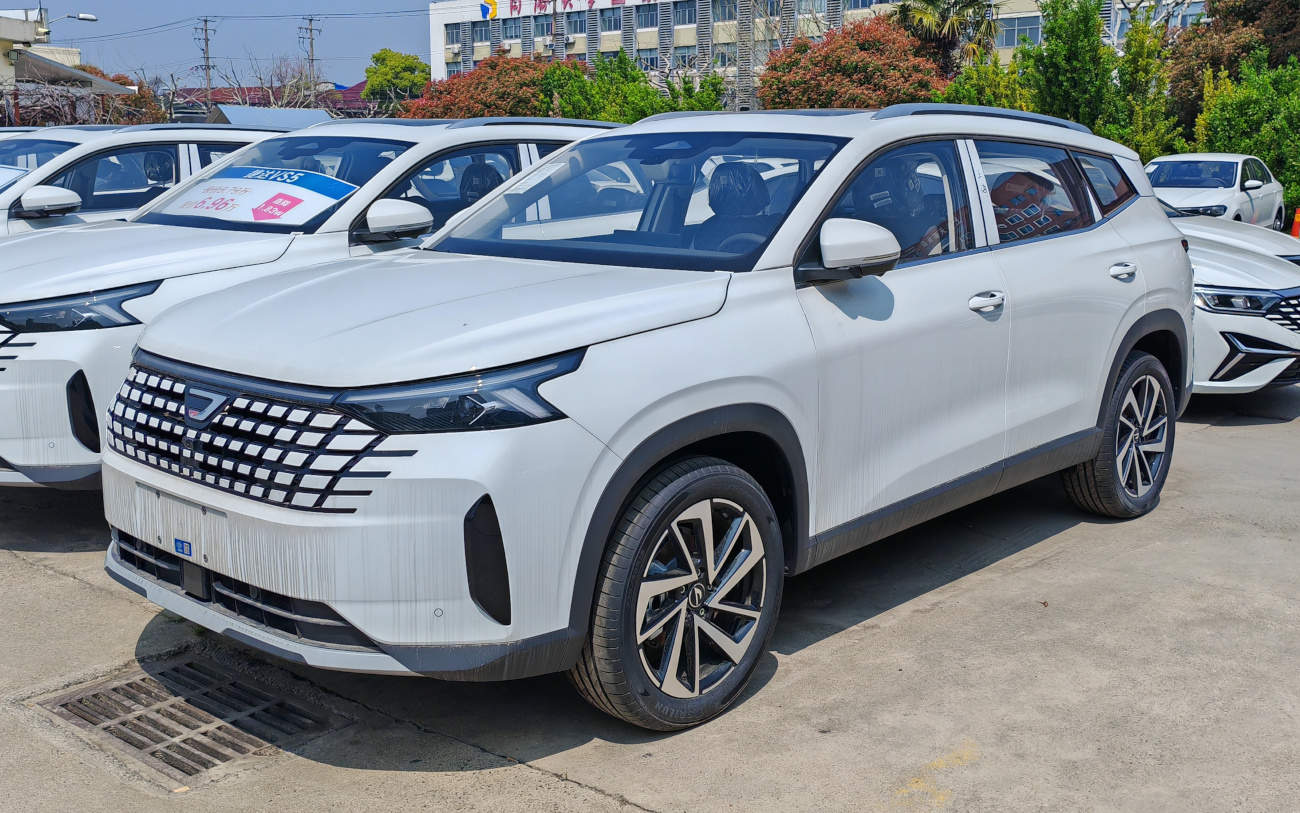

Overview
- Manufacturer: FAW-Volkswagen
- Production: 2025–present
- Assembly: China: Chengdu (FAW-VW)

Body and chassis
- Class: Mid-size crossover SUV
- Body style: 5-door SUV
- Layout: Front-engine, front-wheel-drive
- Platform: Volkswagen Group MQB Evo
- Related: Jetta VS7; Škoda Kodiaq Mk2; Volkswagen Tayron Mk2

Powertrain
- Engine: 1.4 L EA211 TSI I4
- Transmission: 6-speed automatic

Dimensions
- Wheelbase: 2,685 mm (105.7 in)
- Length: 4,629 mm (182.2 in)
- Width: 1,851 mm (72.9 in)
- Height: 1,624 mm (63.9 in)

The Jetta VS8 is a mid-size crossover SUV produced by Volkswagen under the Jetta brand exclusively for the Chinese market.

== Overview ==
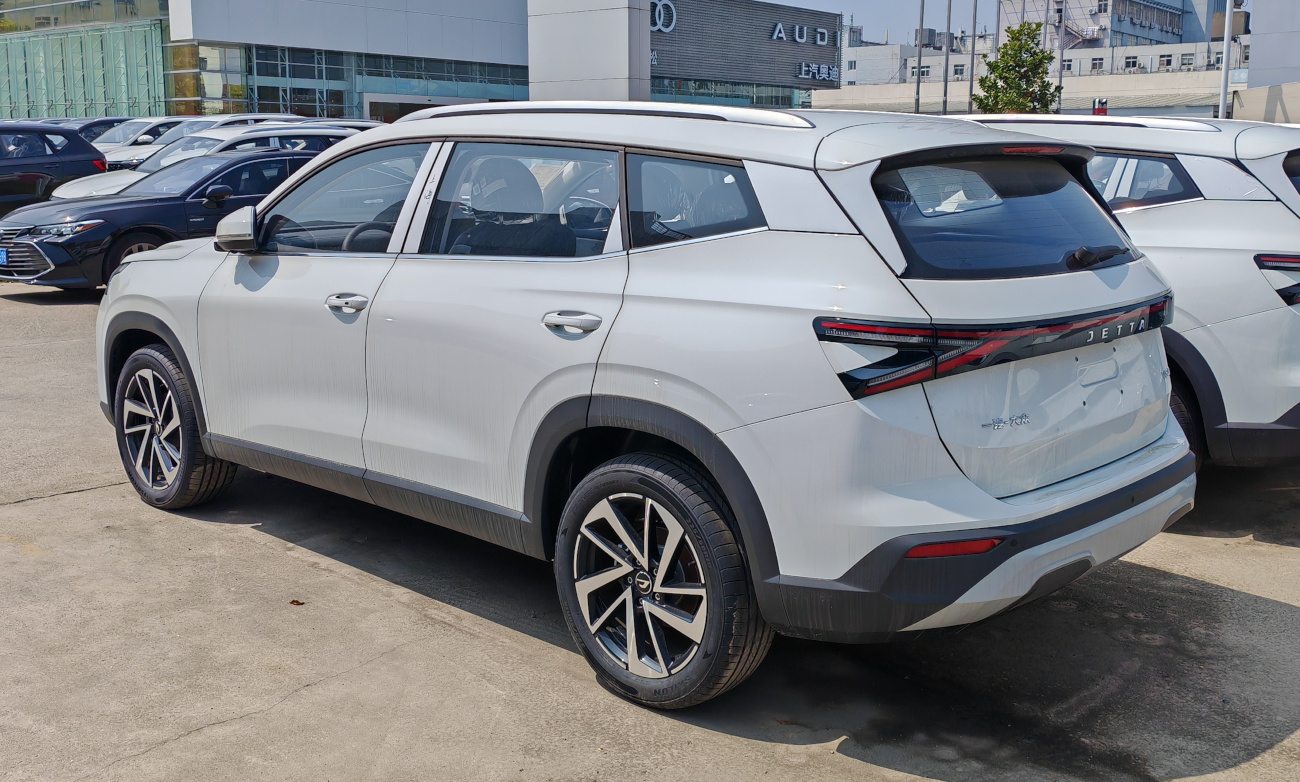
Rear view

The VS8 is a 5-door SUV that is marketed as the flagship SUV of the Jetta brand. Production started in July of 2025 and sales are set to commence in the second half of 2025. Teasers of the model were shown on Weibo on July 9, 2025. Full images of the VS8 and the specifications were revealed not long after the details of the model were released by the MIIT.

Pre-sales of the VS8 began on August 9, 2025. It was publicly unveiled at the 2025 Chengdu Auto Show. The VS8 is the only vehicle in Jetta's lineup that is unique to the brand with every other car based on existing Volkswagen models. It is also the largest in Jetta's lineup.

=== Design ===
The VS8 uses light bars at both the front and rear. Tapered rear windows are also utilized and the VS8's grille is body colored. Gloss black inserts are present on the front end that mimic air intakes. A light bar is also used at the back, and there are dual fake exhaust tips. The VS8 uses a unique design language. It also has Y-shaped taillights and a slanted C-pillar.

=== Features ===
The VS8 uses a 10.25-inch LCD instrument cluster and a 14.6-inch central touchscreen. It has a 3-spoke steering wheel and the shifter is also mounted on the steering column. An illuminated trim panel is also present on the dashboard and is located in front of the front passenger seat. The infotainment runs Yuexing OS and has integration with DeepSeek and ByteDance's Doubao voice model.

== Powertrain ==
The VS8 uses a 1.4 liter turbocharged inline 4 that belongs to the EA211 engine family, mated to a 6-speed automatic transmission despite being rumored that it would use a 7-speed dual clutch transmission. It will only be available in front-wheel-drive.

== Sales ==
Year	China
2025	6,336
