= Eastman Business Park =

Complex and neighborhood in Rochester, New York

Coordinates: 43.199°N 77.631°W

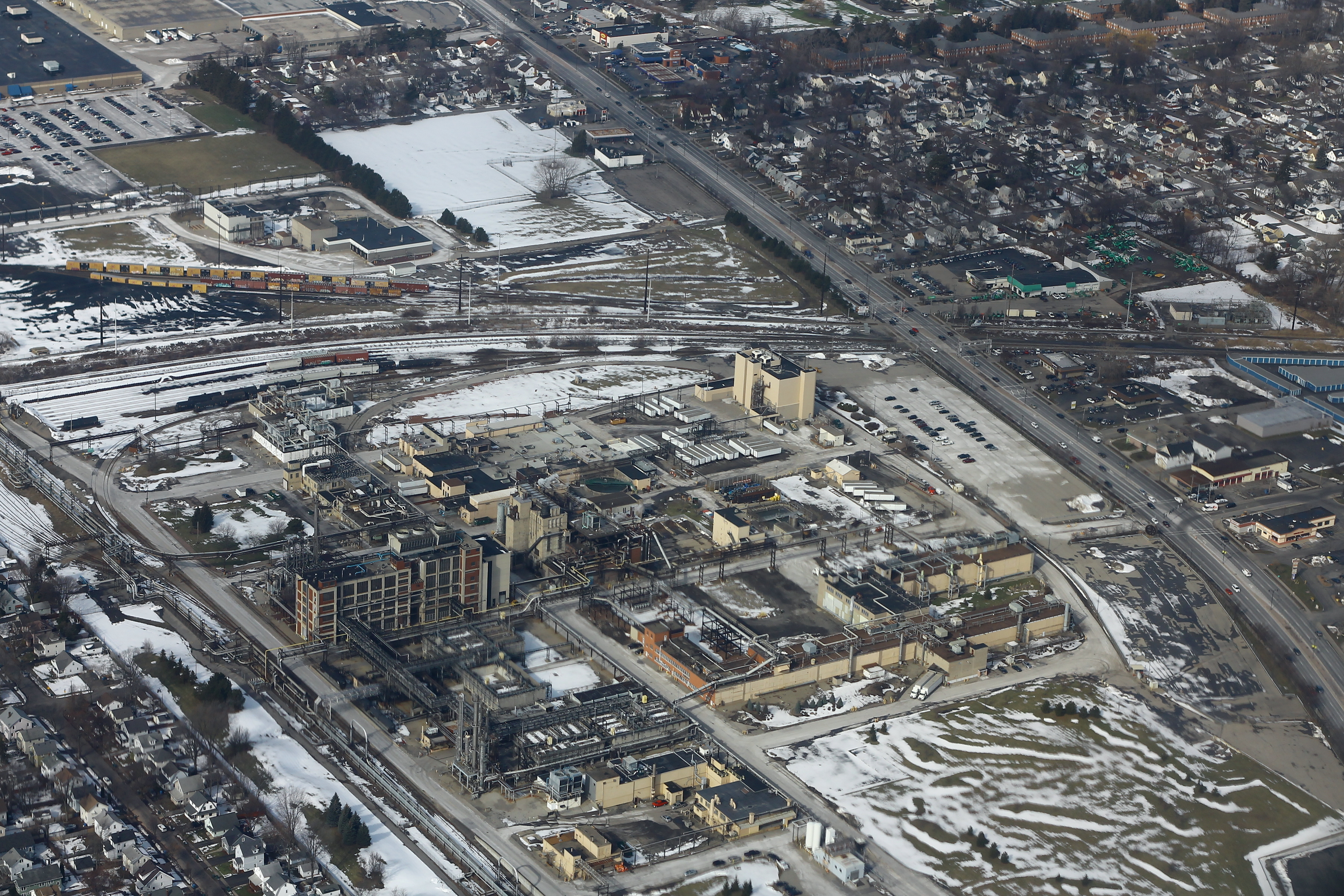
- Part of Eastman Business Park
- Founded: 1890; 136 years ago
- Founder: George Eastman
- Headquarters: Rochester, New York

Eastman Business Park, formerly Kodak Park, is a large manufacturing and industrial complex in the city of Rochester, New York, in the United States. The complex is run by Eastman Kodak and is located 3 miles (5 km) north of downtown Rochester and 4 miles (6 km) south of Lake Ontario. The complex runs parallel to New York State Route 104 and Mount Read Boulevard for most of its length. Also part of the complex is the Kodak Center performing arts center and conference facility.

Eastman Business Park is serviced by both CSX, via the Charlotte Running Track, and Norfolk Southern, via the Rochester and Southern Railroad. The plant also maintains an intra-plant railroad. It was formerly serviced by the Rochester Subway via the Dewey Avenue surface connection.

The ashes of Eastman Kodak founder George Eastman are buried here.

== History ==
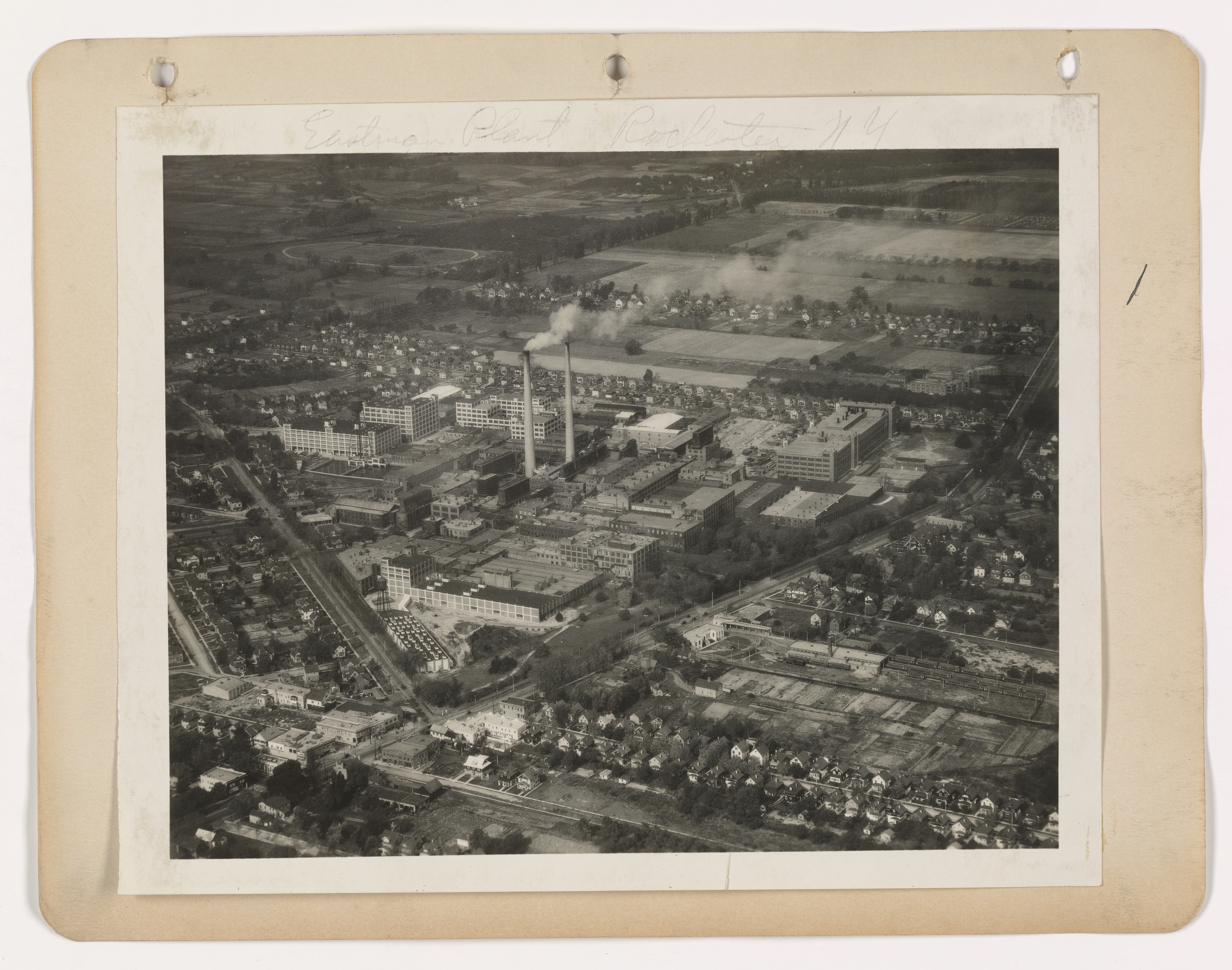
Aerial photograph

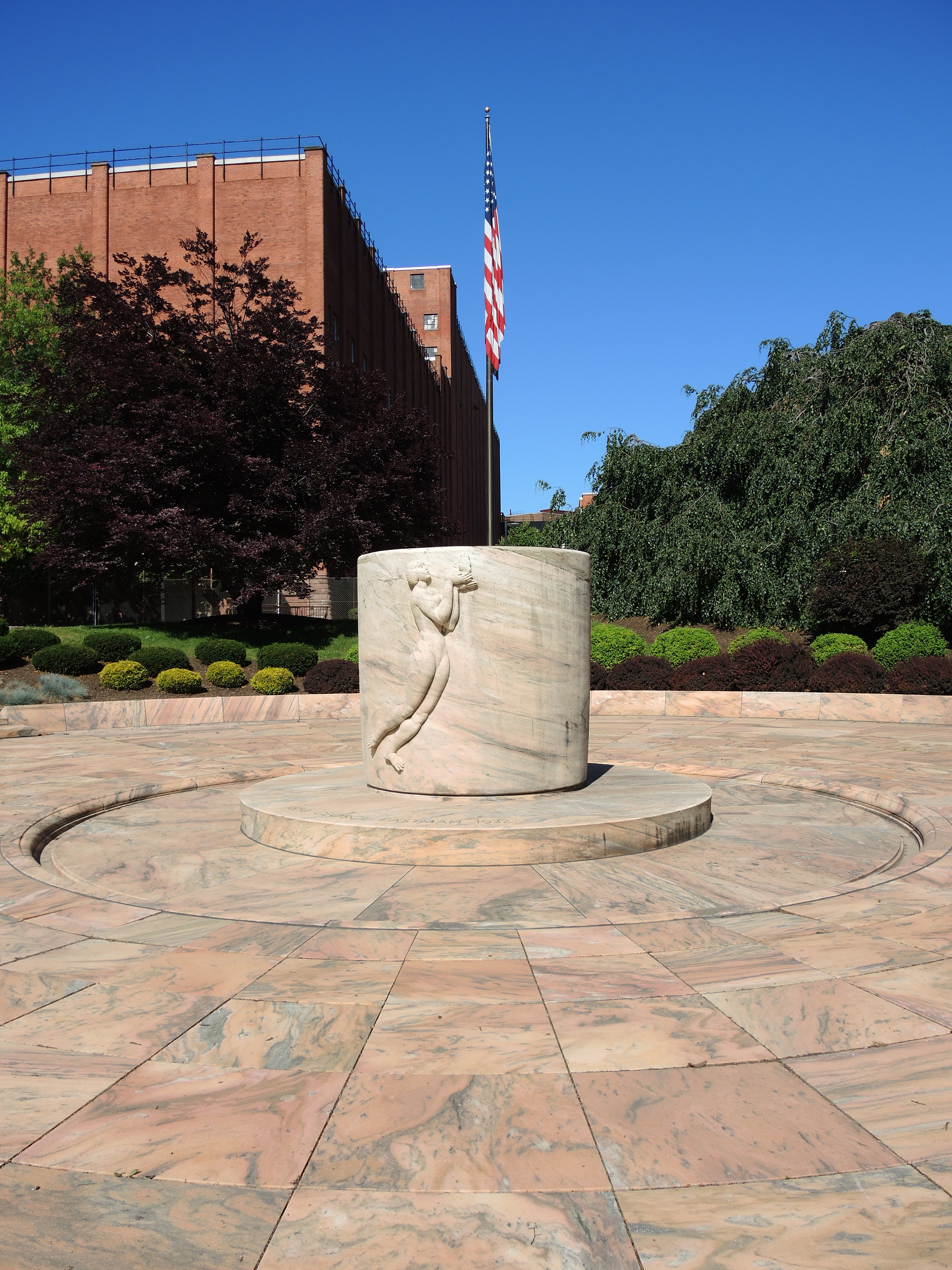
Memorial to George Eastman at Eastman Business Park. His ashes lie beneath the Georgia marble monument.

In the decades following 1890, Kodak Park was constructed to meet the massive demand of Eastman Kodak Company's photographic and motion picture film products. The park would eventually become the largest photographic product manufacturing facility in the world, employing over 15,000 employees in over 154 different buildings spanning its 1,300 acres.

In the mid-2000s, Eastman Kodak began downsizing its film manufacturing operations due to the shrinking demand for film. A number of unused buildings were demolished in 2007.

On November 11, 2008, Eastman Kodak officially renamed Kodak Park "Eastman Business Park" and began an aggressive marketing campaign to attract new tenants to the park.

During the bankruptcy of Eastman Kodak in 2012, Eastman Kodak began selling off a number of large assets in Eastman business park as it continued to downsize; this included its coal power plant, as well numerous other land and building assets.

The park has been used as a filming location for several television series and films, including the 2019 automobile racing reality competition series Hyperdrive.

== Controversy ==
In 2012 it was revealed that Kodak had stored uranium in an underground lab for almost 30 years. The material was used for research in a Californium neutron flux multiplier. Although the uranium was considered weapons-grade, it was not present in large enough quantities to construct a weapon with.

== Companies and institutions in or near the Eastman Business Park ==
As Eastman Kodak downsized, the manufacturing facilities were leased out to both established and start-up manufacturing companies. As of 2012 members of Eastman Business Park Include:

- Acquest Development
- American Fuel Cell
- Arnprior
- Cardinal Logistics Mgmt.
- Carestream Health
- Cerion Nanomaterials
- Columbia Care LLC
- DNV KEMA Energy & Sustainability
- DuPont Danisco
- Eastman Kodak Company
- Eastman Park Micrographics
- ESL Federal Credit Union
- Excell Partners Inc.
- Empire Digital Signs
- Energy Materials Corporation
- LiDestri Foods
- Lumisyn
- Genencor International
- George Eastman Museum-Film Preservation Services
- Graphenix
- Great Lakes Environmental
- GreenLight Biosciences
- Guardsmark
- Harris Corporation 9(formerly Exelis)
- Intrinsiq Materials
- IMAX
- Kingsbury Corporation
- Kodak Alaris
- Khuri Enterprises
- Molecular Glasses
- Natcore Technologies
- Naturally Scientific US
- NOHMs Technologies Inc.
- NY-BEST Test Commercialization Center / DNV-GL
- Novomer
- Oak Ridge National Laboratory
- OmniID
- ON Semiconductor
- Optimation
- Orthogonal
- Ortho Clinical Diagnostics
- Premise Health / AO Safety
- Proton Innovations
- Quintel
- RAPA (Rochester Association of Performing Arts)
- RED (Recycled Energy Development Co.)
- R-Display & Lighting
- Rochester Silver Works
- Safety Solutions
- SiGNa Chemistry
- Transparent Materials
- VFX
- Xpedx
- Yaro Enterprises

== Future of Eastman Business Park ==
Eastman Business Park has been described as a vital part of Rochester, NY's economic growth efforts. State and local governments and Eastman Kodak Company itself have been steadily working towards turning Eastman Business Park into an innovation hub which would attract large companies as well as small start up companies with a focus on green-tech, photonics, optics and material science to the park.

== See also ==
- Eastman Kodak Company
- Rochester, New York
