= EMD MP15AC =

1,500 hp American diesel switcher locomotive

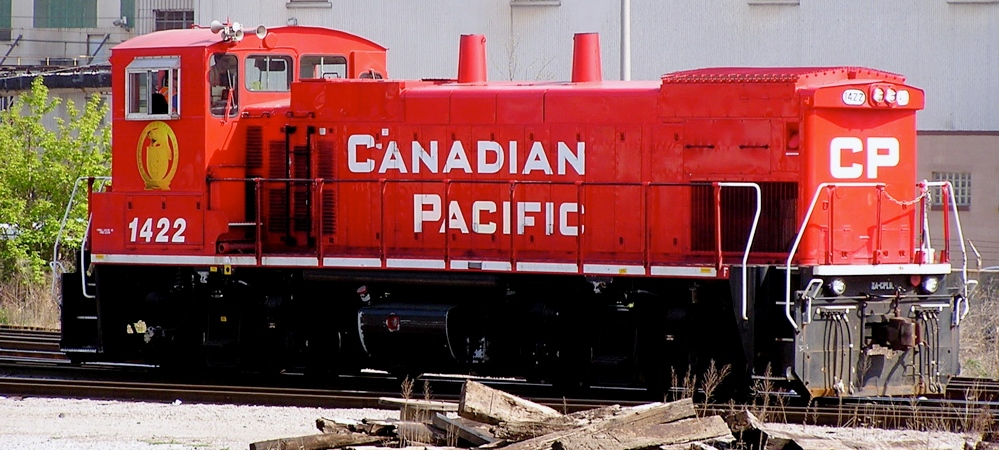
- CP 1422. ex-SOO 1552, nee Milwaukee Road 486.
Type and origin
- Power type: Diesel-electric
- Builder: General Motors Electro-Motive Division, General Motors Diesel, Canada
- Model: MP15AC
- Build date: August 1975 – August 1984
- Total produced: 246
Specifications
- Configuration
  - AAR: B-B
  - UIC: Bo'Bo'
- Gauge: 4 ft 8 1/2 in (1,435 mm) standard gauge
- Prime mover: EMD 12-645E
- Engine type: V12 two-stroke diesel
- Displacement: 7,740 cu in (126.8 L)
- Cylinders: 12
- Cylinder size: 9 1/16 in × 10 in (230 mm × 254 mm) bore x stroke
Performance figures
- Power output: 1,500 hp (1,120 kW)
Career
- Nicknames: Little Beaver
- Locale: North America

The EMD MP15AC is a 1,500 hp (1,120 kW) diesel road switcher locomotive built by General Motors' Electro-Motive Division between August 1975 and August 1984. A variant of the EMD MP15DC with an AC/DC transmission, 246 examples were built, including 25 for export to Mexico, and four built in Canada.

== Development ==
The MP15DC's standard Blomberg B trucks were capable of transition and road speeds up to 60 mph (97 km/h), allowing use on road freights. Soon there was a demand for a model with an advanced AC drive system. The MP15AC replaced the MP15DC's DC generator with an alternator producing AC power which is converted to DC for the traction motors with a silicon rectifier. The MP15AC is 1.5 ft (457 mm) longer than an MP15DC, the extra space being needed for the rectifier equipment. The alternator-rectifier combination is more reliable than a generator, and this equipment became the standard for new diesel-electric locomotive designs.

The MP15AC is easily distinguished from the DC models. Instead of the front-mounted radiator intake and belt-driven fan used on all previous EMD switchers, these have intakes on the lower forward nose sides and electric fans. Side intakes allowed the unit to take in cooler air, and the electric fans improved a serious reliability issue found in its earlier DC sisters.

== Engine ==
The MP15 used a roots-blown 12-cylinder 645E engine. The engine is rated at 1,500 hp (1,120 kW). The 645 series, introduced in 1966, was EMD's standard engine through the 1980s.

== Original owners ==
The six largest buyers, were all buying road locomotives with AR10 alternators throughout the 1970s, so the similarly equipped MP15AC was easily kept in good repair. 36 more units were sold to 8 other customers.

Railroad	Quantity	Road numbers	Notes
Great River Railroad	1	G-1	
Kennecott Utah Copper Corporation	6	120–122, 701, 704, 906	
Kodak Park Railroad	1	10	
General Motors Electro-Motive Division	2	115–116	
Missouri-Kansas-Texas	4	56–59	
Milwaukee Road	64	434–497	
National Harbours Board	4	8403–8406	Built by GMD in London, Ontario
Southern Pacific	58	2702–2759	
Seaboard Coast Line Railroad	45	4000–4019, 4200–4224	
Nacionales de México	25	9801–9825	
Long Island	23	150–172	
Louisville & Nashville	10	4225–4234	
Terminal Alabama State Docks	1	803	
US Department of Energy	2	3727–3728	Rockwell Hanford Operations
Total	246		

== See also ==
- List of GM-EMD locomotives
- List of GMD Locomotives
- EMD MP15AC photos at rrpicturearchives.net
