= Jetta VS7 =

Chinese-market mid-size crossover SUV

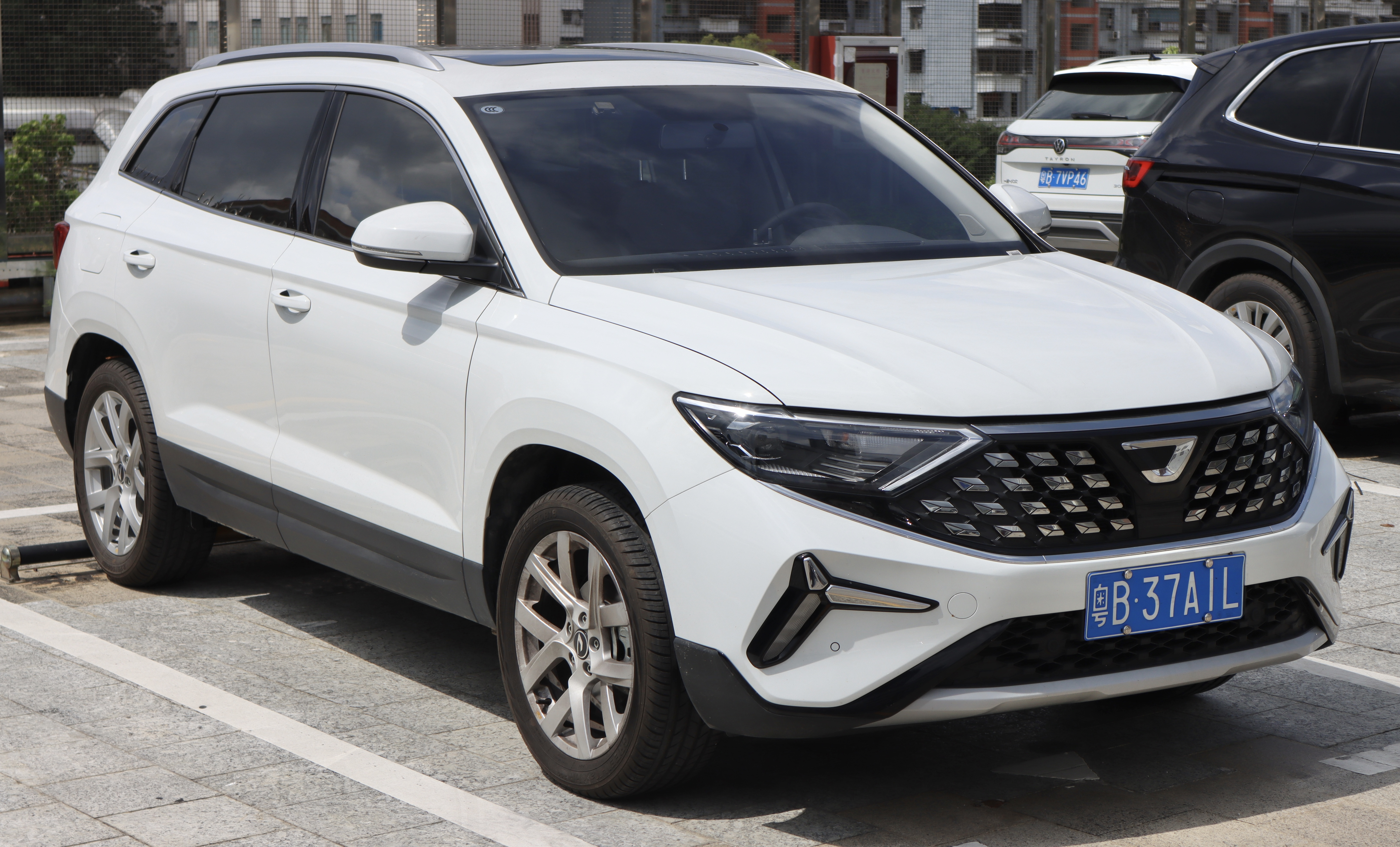

Overview
- Manufacturer: FAW-Volkswagen (Jetta)
- Also called: Volkswagen Jetta VS7 (Cambodia)
- Production: 2020–present
- Assembly: China: Chengdu (FAW-VW); Cambodia: Pou Smat Village (Kandal province)

Body and chassis
- Class: Mid-size crossover SUV
- Body style: 5-door SUV
- Layout: Front-engine, front-wheel drive
- Platform: Volkswagen Group MQB platform
- Related: Jetta VS5; Jetta VS8; SEAT Tarraco; Škoda Kodiaq; Volkswagen Tiguan Allspace

Powertrain
- Engine: 1.4 L EA211 TSI I4 (petrol)
- Transmission: 6-speed manual 6-speed automatic

Dimensions
- Wheelbase: 2,730 mm (107.5 in)
- Length: 4,624 mm (182.0 in)
- Width: 1,841 mm (72.5 in)
- Height: 1,633 mm (64.3 in)

The Jetta VS7 is a mid-size crossover SUV manufactured by FAW-Volkswagen for its China-exclusive brand, Jetta since 2020.

== Overview ==
The Jetta VS7 was first presented at the Auto Shanghai in April 2019, coinciding with the launch of the newly established brand of Jetta, a youth-focused brand for China named after the Volkswagen Jetta. It went on sale in China in March 2020.

Produced by FAW-Volkswagen in Chengdu, the VS7 served as the stretched three-row version of the VS5. It uses the EA211 engine, a 1.4-litre turbocharged inline four cylinder making 150 PS (148 hp) and 250 Nm (184 lb ft) of torque. The VS7 shares the same platform with the SEAT Tarraco and the Škoda Kodiaq.

In August 2023, the Jetta VS7 was introduced in Tehran, Iran alongside the Jetta VS5 and Jetta VA3 by Mammut Khodro, the official distributor of Volkswagen in Iran. The three models by Jetta will be released in Iran by end of the year.

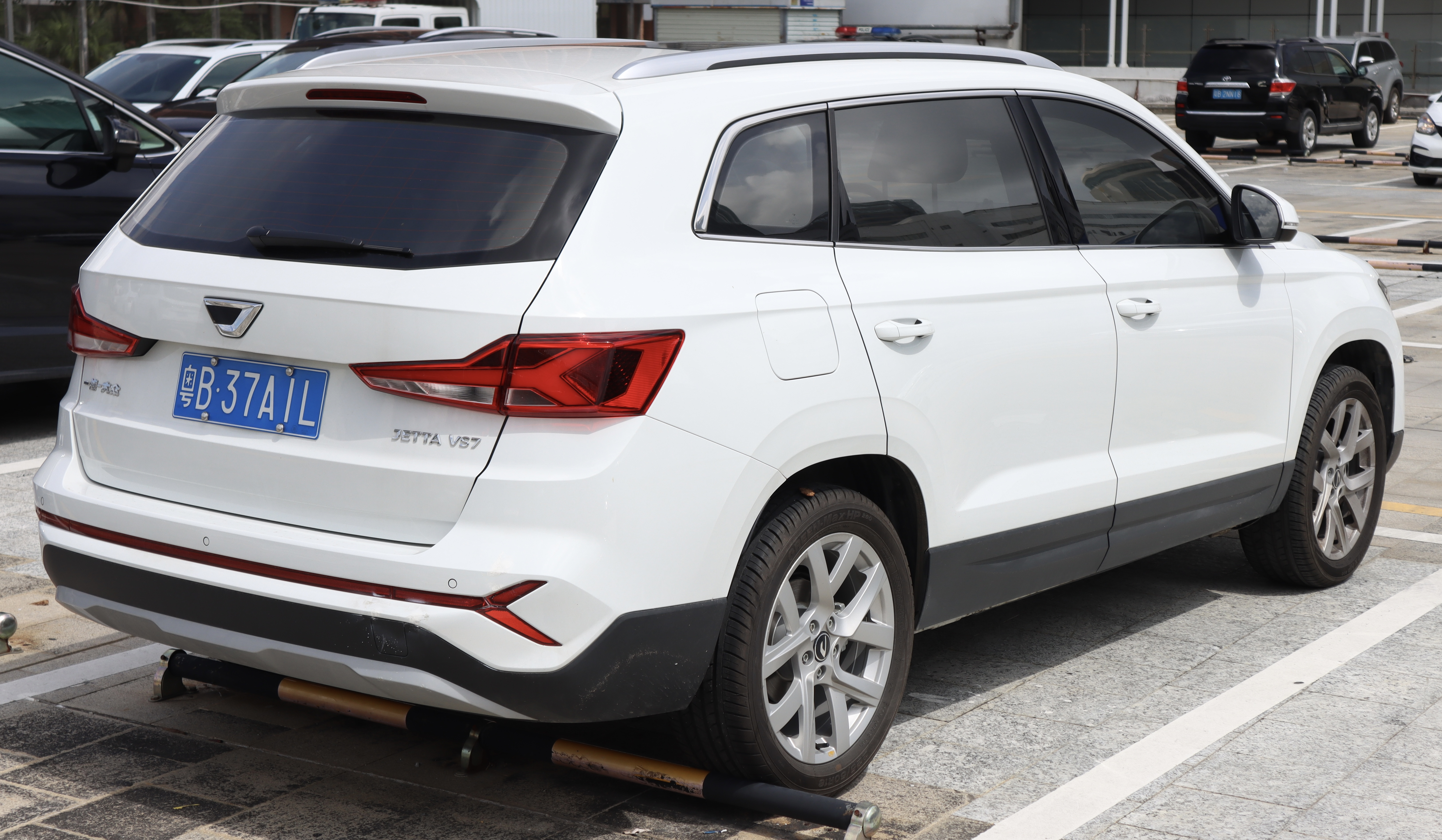
Rear view

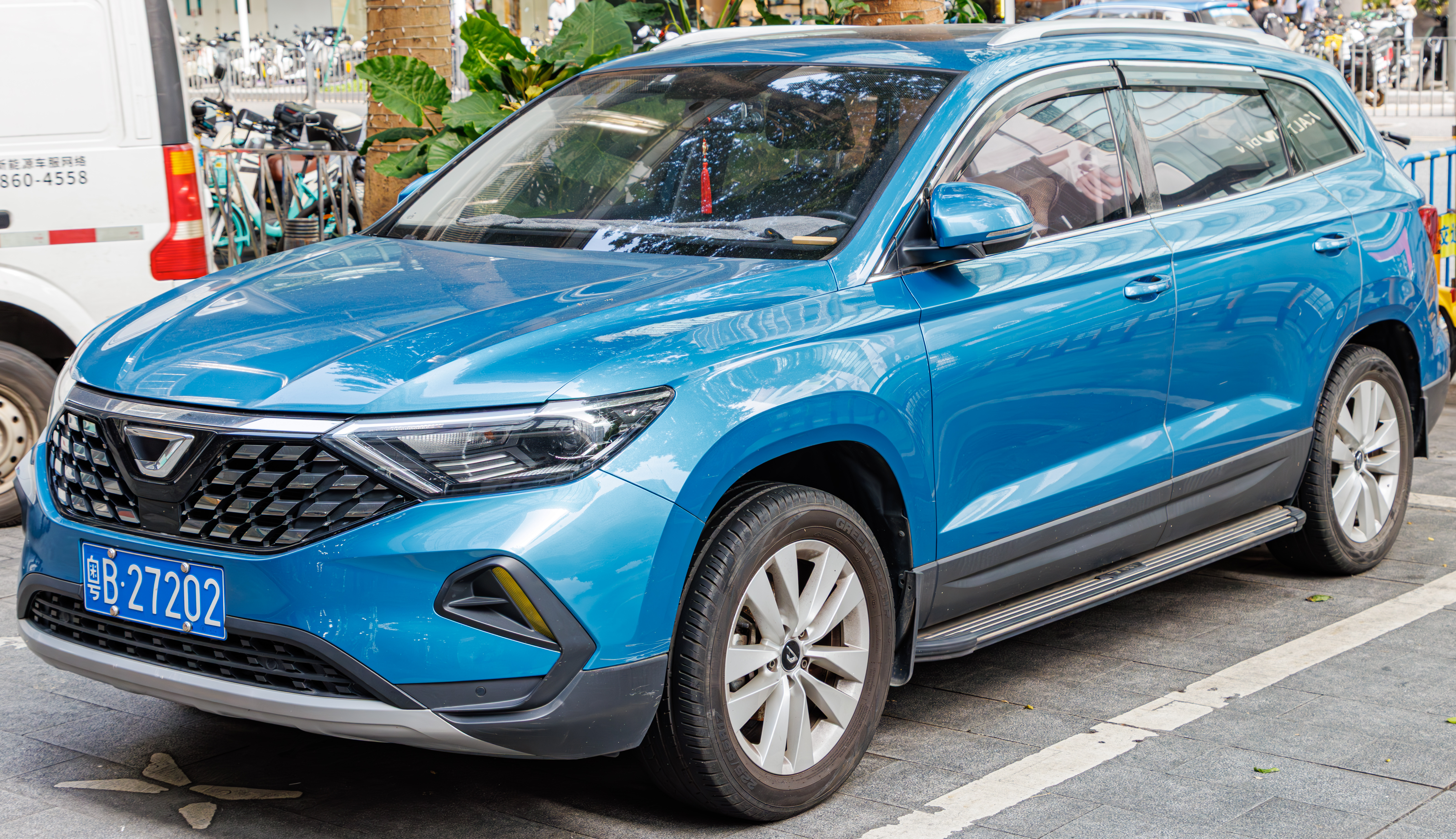
pre-facelift

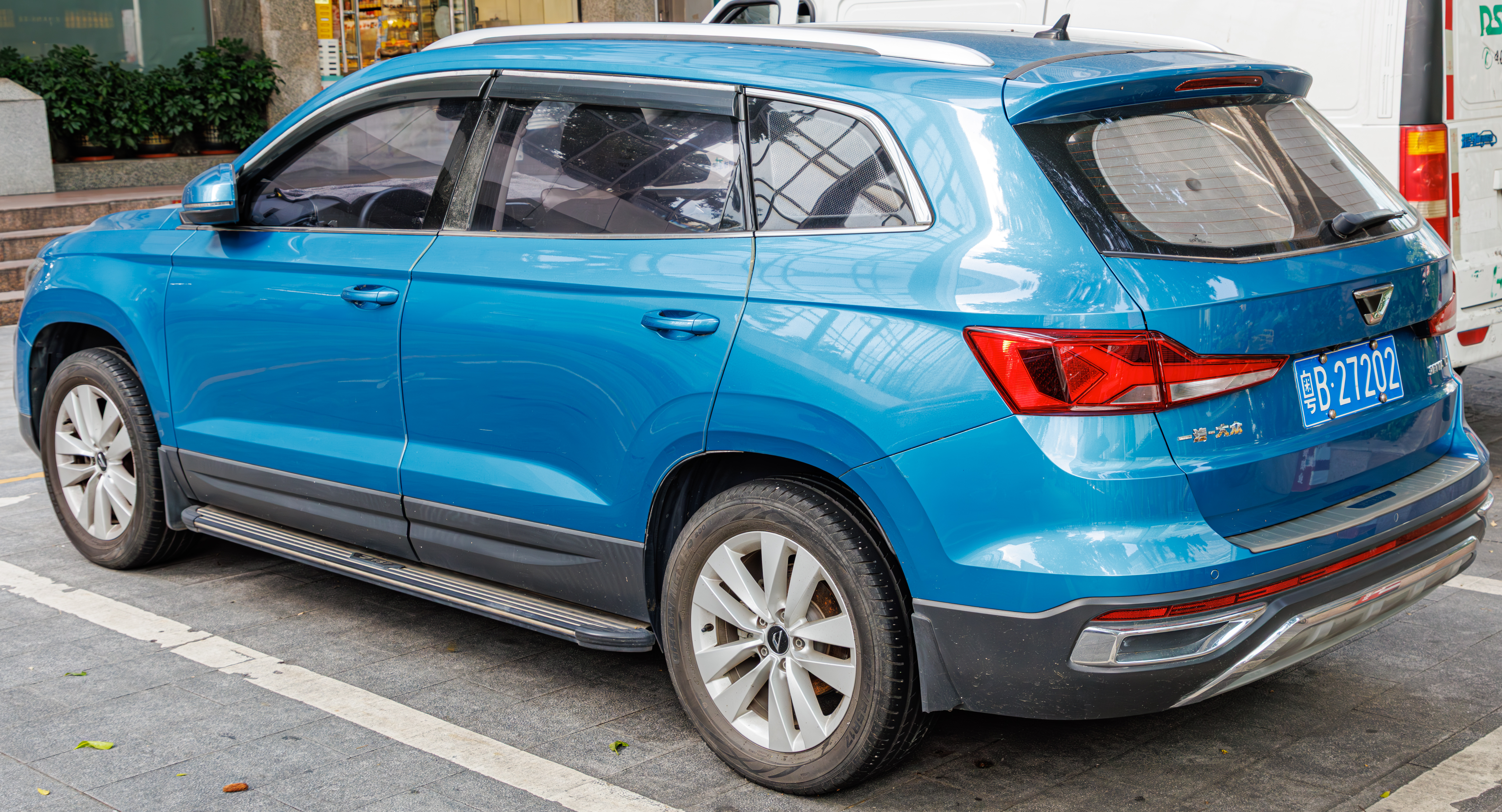
Rear view (pre-facelift)

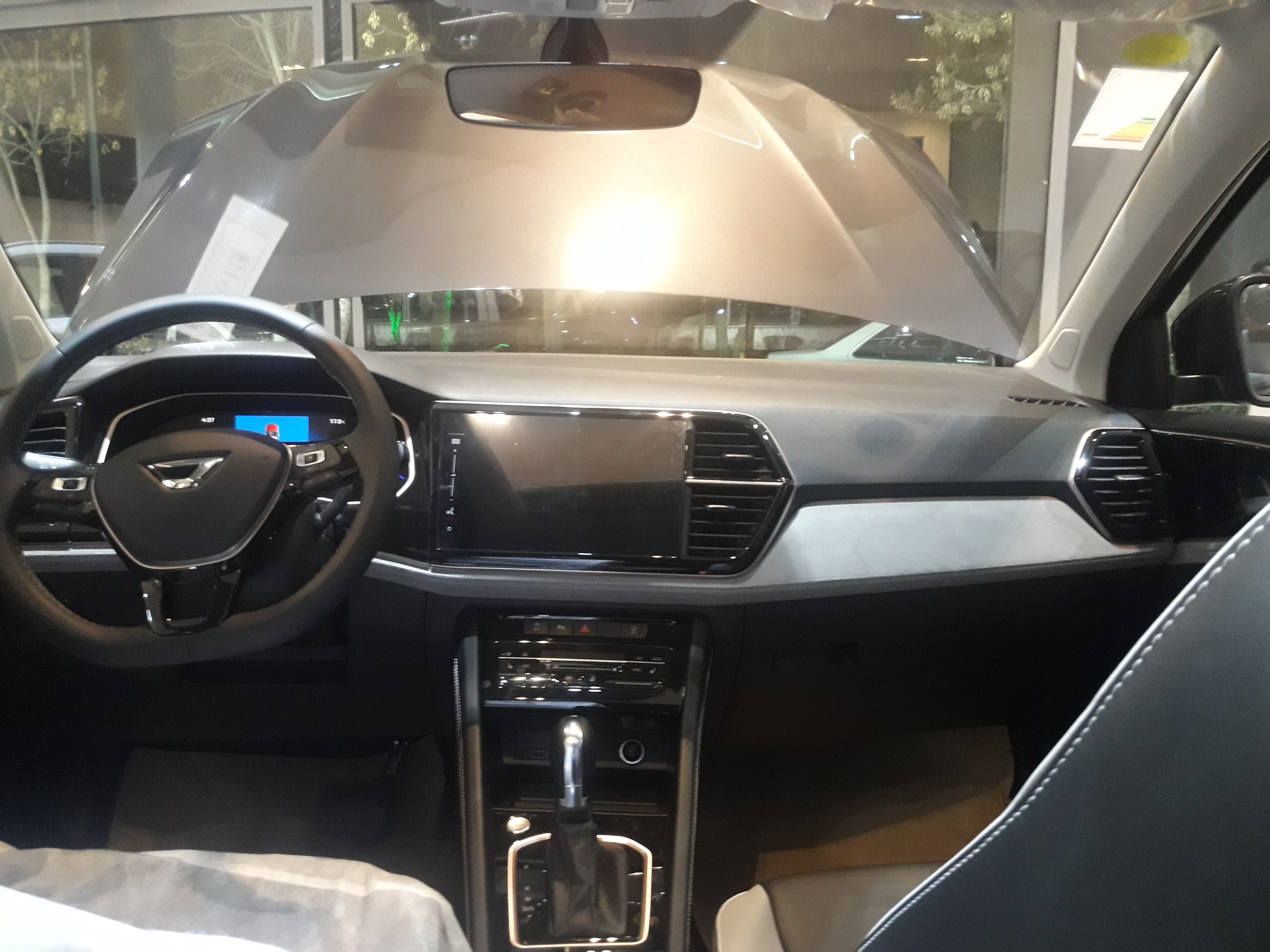
Interior

== Sales ==
Year	China
2023	30,896
2024	18,804
2025	15,553
