= Kodak Park Railroad =

Private railroad in Rochester, New York

Overview
- Operator: Rochester Switching Services
- Reporting mark: KCDX
- Dates of operation: 1907–present

Technical
- Track gauge: Standard gauge

The Kodak Park Railroad is a private railroad owned by Eastman Kodak Company, which services Kodak Park in Rochester, New York. It is now called Rochester Switching Services, Inc.

== History ==
The Kodak Park Railroad was originally built in 1907 by George Eastman.

== Historical rolling stock ==
Equipment used by Kodak Park has included:

Built	Make and model	Road Nos.	Origin	Status
1971	EMD SW1500	3	Ex-Pittsburgh & Lake Erie 1560	
1952	EMD GP7	4	Ex-Pittsburgh & Lake Erie 1521	
1923	GE 49-ton locomotive (steeplecab)	5	Ex-Philadelphia, Bethlehem, & New England 201, nee-NYC 1505, aka NYC 505	
1946	GE 80-ton switcher	6	New-built	Donated to Rochester & Genesee Valley Railroad Museum in 1981
1950	GE 95-ton switcher	7	New-built	
1968	EMD SW1000	8	New-built	
1950	ALCO RS-1	9	Ex-Genesse & Wyoming 44, nee-Chicago & Western Indiana 260	Donated to Rochester & Genesee Valley Railroad Museum in 1997
1951	ALCO RS-3	10	Ex-S.J. Groves, nee-Minnesota Transfer Railway	Retired
1981	EMD MP15AC	10		Active

== Preservation ==
Two ex-Kodak Park Railroad units are known to have been preserved: Kodak Park 6 and 9 at the Rochester & Genesee Valley Railroad Museum.
