= Kodiak Cakes =

Brand of pancake and waffle mix

- Product type: Pancake mix, breakfast foods
- Country: United States
- Introduced: 1982; 44 years ago
- Website: kodiakcakes.com

Kodiak Cakes is a brand of whole-grain pancake and waffle mixes. The brand, which began as a small family operation, is based in Park City, Utah and ultimately expanded to market protein-enhanced pancake and waffle mixes, individual oatmeal, brownie mixes, frozen prepacked waffles, frozen prepacked pancakes, granola protein bars, and fruit syrups.

== History ==
Kodiak Cakes was founded in 1982 as a family brand. In the 1990s the two brothers from the same family incorporated their family's business, but met with limited financial success. In 2014, the brand was featured on an episode of the American television show Shark Tank, though the company declined to make a deal with the show's hosts. The company's sales subsequently increased, leading to the brand being cited, as an example of a company that benefited from not reaching an agreement with the popular show.

After appearing on Shark Tank in 2014, Kodiak Cakes' sales rose from $3.6 million in 2013 to $6.7 million in 2014. Additional revenue allowed the company to focus on product innovation and expanding its consumer base, leading to the development of a frozen line of pancakes and waffles, as well as graham bites, oatmeal, and granola bars. L Catterton, a private equity firm, acquired a majority stake in Kodiak Cakes in May 2021.

Company founder, Joel Clark, and Kodiak Cakes were featured on the podcast How I Built This with Guy Raz in 2020.

By 2024, actor and lifestyle guru Zac Efron became a Brand Ambassador for the company.
