= Škoda Kodiaq =

Full-size crossover SUV produced by Škoda

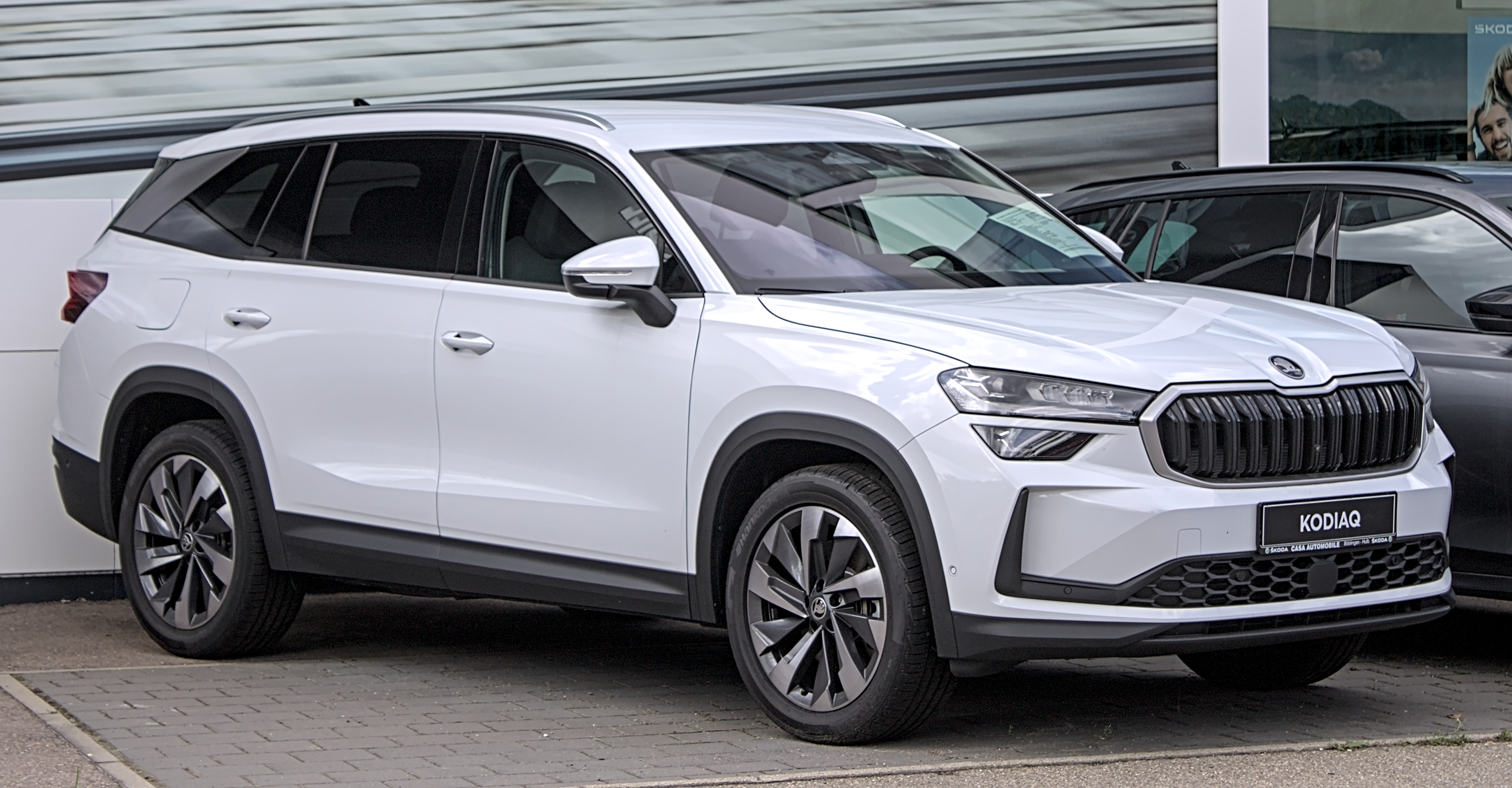
- Skoda Kodiaq (II)

Overview
- Manufacturer: Škoda Auto
- Production: 2016–present

Body and chassis
- Class: Full-size SUV (E-segment)
- Body style: 5-door crossover SUV
- Layout: Front-engine, front-wheel-drive; Front-engine, all-wheel-drive

Škoda Kodiaq is a mid-size crossover SUV produced by the Czech carmaker Škoda Auto since 2016. It is positioned above the Kamiq and Karoq in Škoda's range and is available with five or seven seats, depending on the version.

The first generation was built on the Volkswagen Group's MQB platform. Its successor, unveiled in October 2023 and produced since January 2024, uses the MQB Evo platform and introduced mild-hybrid and plug-in hybrid options alongside conventional petrol and diesel engines.

== First generation (2016) ==
First generation
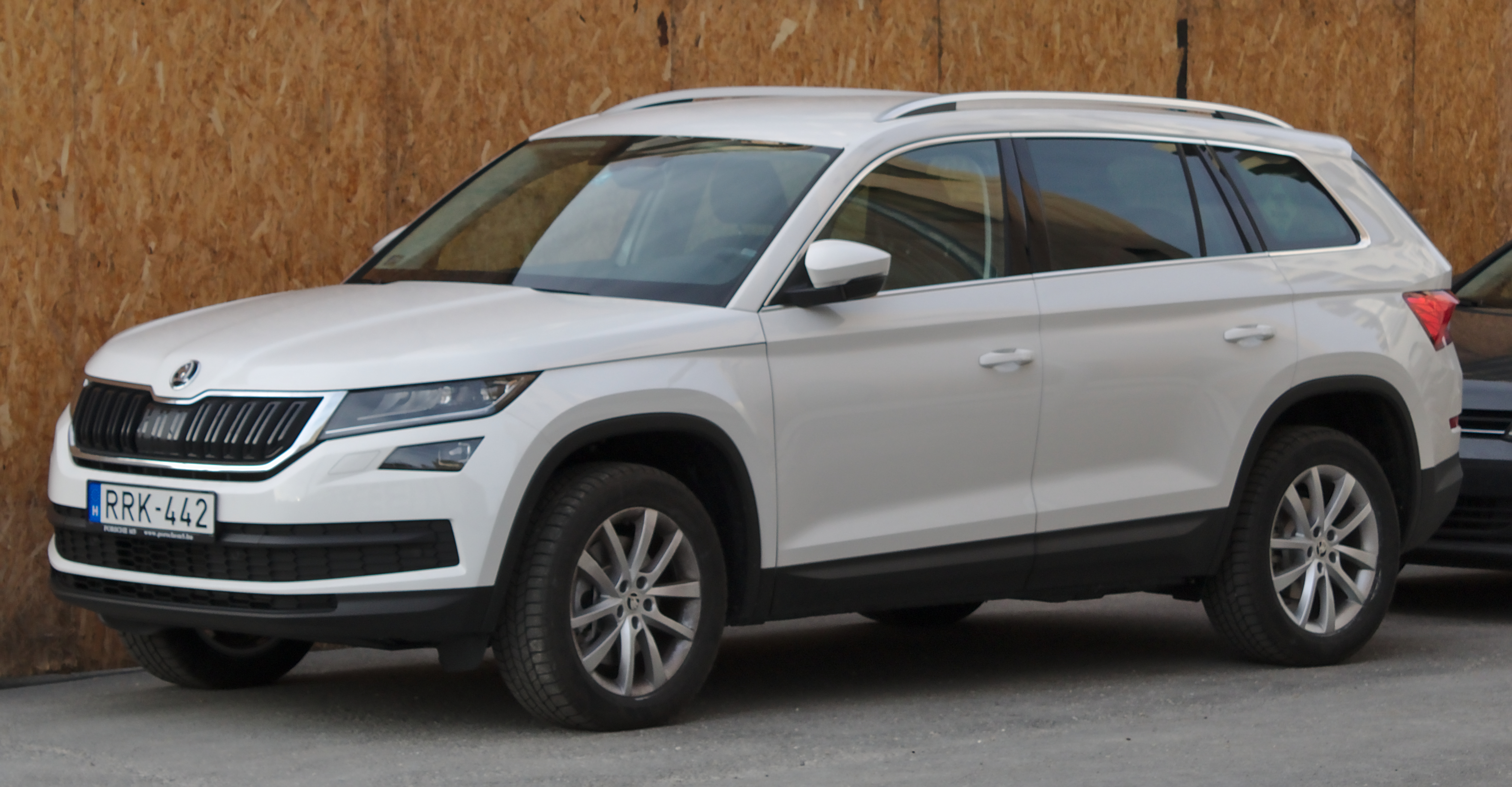

Overview
- Model code: NS7; NV7; NS6
- Production: October 2016–2024 (Global); 2016–2026 (China)
- Assembly: Czech Republic: Kvasiny; China: Changsha (SAIC-VW); India: Aurangabad (Škoda India); Russia: Nizhny Novgorod (GAZ); Ukraine: Solomonovo (Eurocar)
- Designer: Jozef Kabaň, Dalibor Pantůček

Body and chassis
- Platform: Volkswagen Group MQB A2
- Related: Volkswagen Tiguan Allspace; SEAT Tarraco; Jetta VS7; Audi Q5

Powertrain
- Engine: Petrol: 1.4 L TSI 125 I4; 1.4 L TSI 150 I4; 1.5 L TSI 150 I4; 2.0 L TSI 180 I4; 2.0 L TSI 190 I4; 2.0 L TSI 220 I4 (Kodiaq GT; China); 2.0 L TSI 245 I4 (Kodiaq RS facelift); Diesel: 2.0 L TDI 150 I4; 2.0 L TDI 190 I4; 2.0 L TDI 200 I4 (facelift 2020+); 2.0 L TDI 240 I4 (Kodiaq RS pre-facelift)
- Transmission: 6-speed manual 6-speed DSG; 7-speed DSG

Dimensions
- Wheelbase: 2,791 mm (109.9 in)
- Length: 4,697 mm (184.9 in); 4,630 mm (182.3 in) (Kodiaq GT)
- Width: 1,882 mm (74.1 in)
- Height: 1,676 mm (66.0 in); 1,683 mm (66.3 in) (Kodiaq Scout)
- Curb weight: 1,452–1,686 kg (3,201–3,717 lb)

The first-generation Kodiaq was previously previewed as concept car named Škoda Vision S at the Geneva Motor Show 2016. In December 2006, Škoda registered the name "Kodiaq". The name refers to the largest brown bear, the Kodiak bear, living on the island of the same name off the south coast of Alaska. As part of its marketing campaign in 2016, the Kodiak town in Kodiak Island, Alaska was renamed Kodiaq for one day, although the Kodiaq is not sold in the US.

In February 2016, images of the Vision S concept were released, and the concept model appeared in March 2016 at the Geneva Motor Show. The final SUV was introduced at the Paris Motor Show on 29 September 2016. The first cars were officially delivered to customers in February 2017.

The Kodiaq is the first vehicle in the Škoda lineup to have Area View, Tow Assist, Manoeuvre Assist and Predictive Pedestrian Protection. It is also the first vehicle in the Volkswagen Group MQB platform lineup to feature capacitive shortcut buttons instead of physical buttons for the 8-inch infotainment systems.

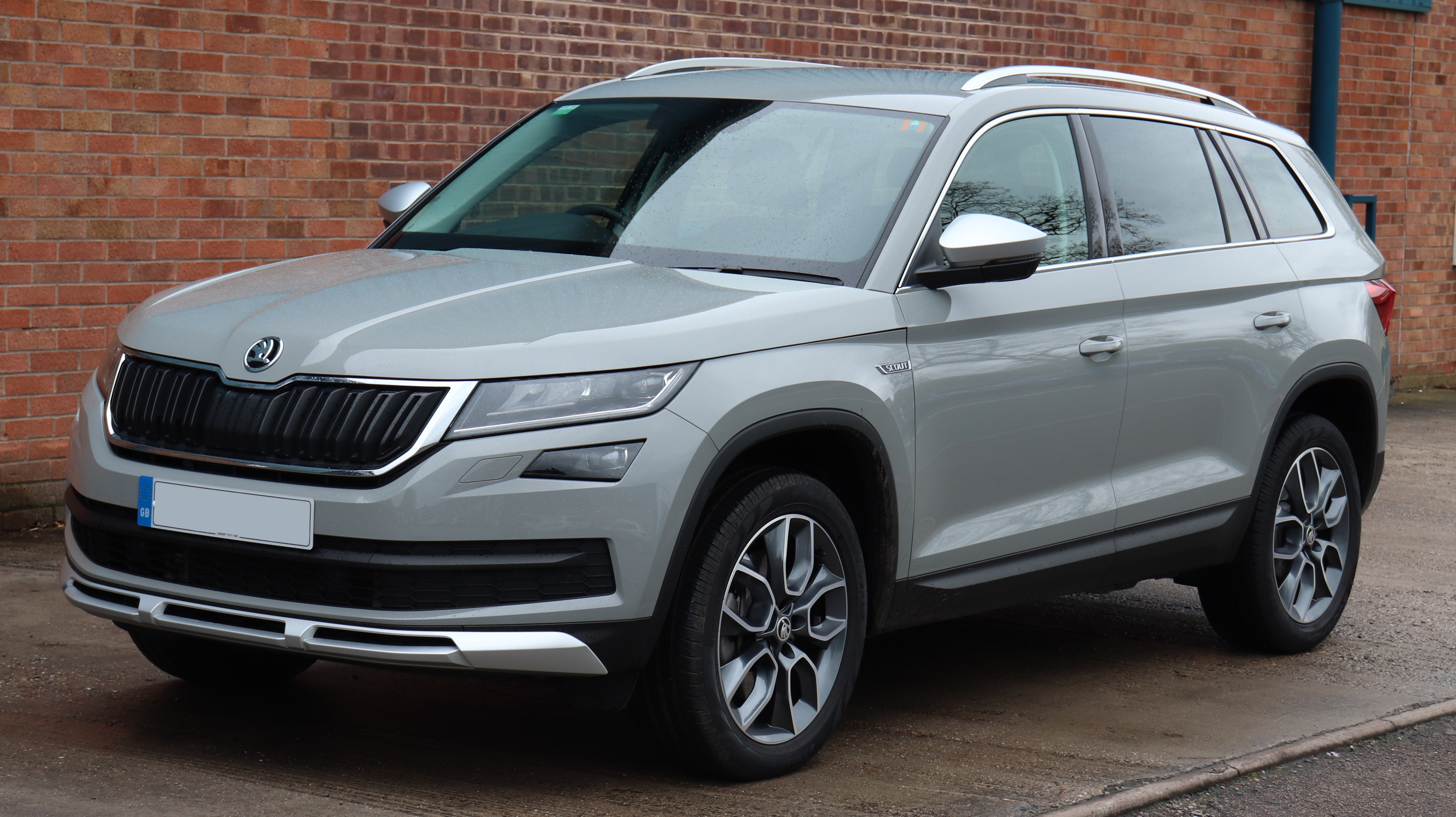
Škoda Kodiaq Scout (front, pre-facelift)

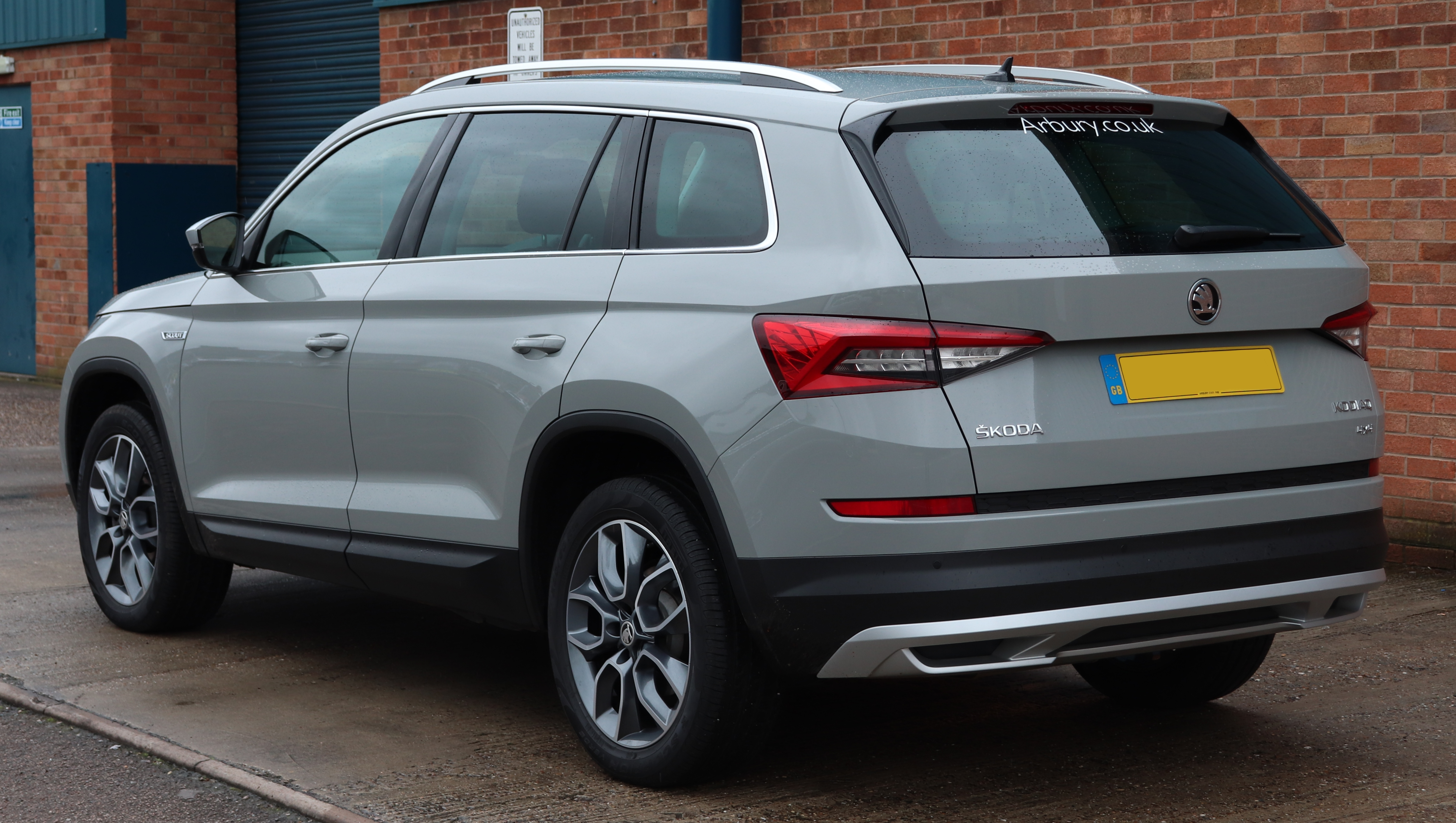
Škoda Kodiaq Scout (rear, pre-facelift)

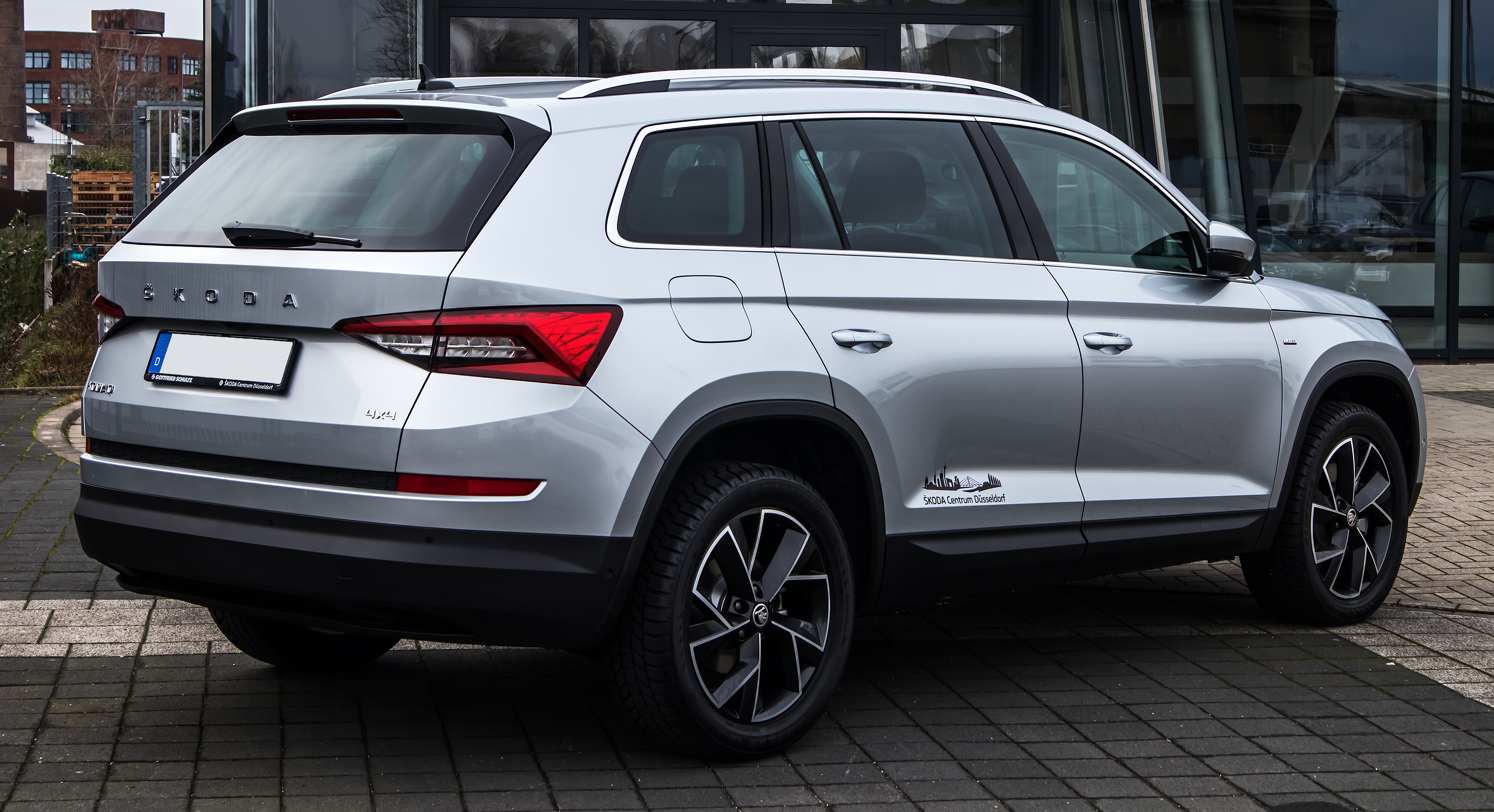
Škoda Kodiaq (2020 refresh)

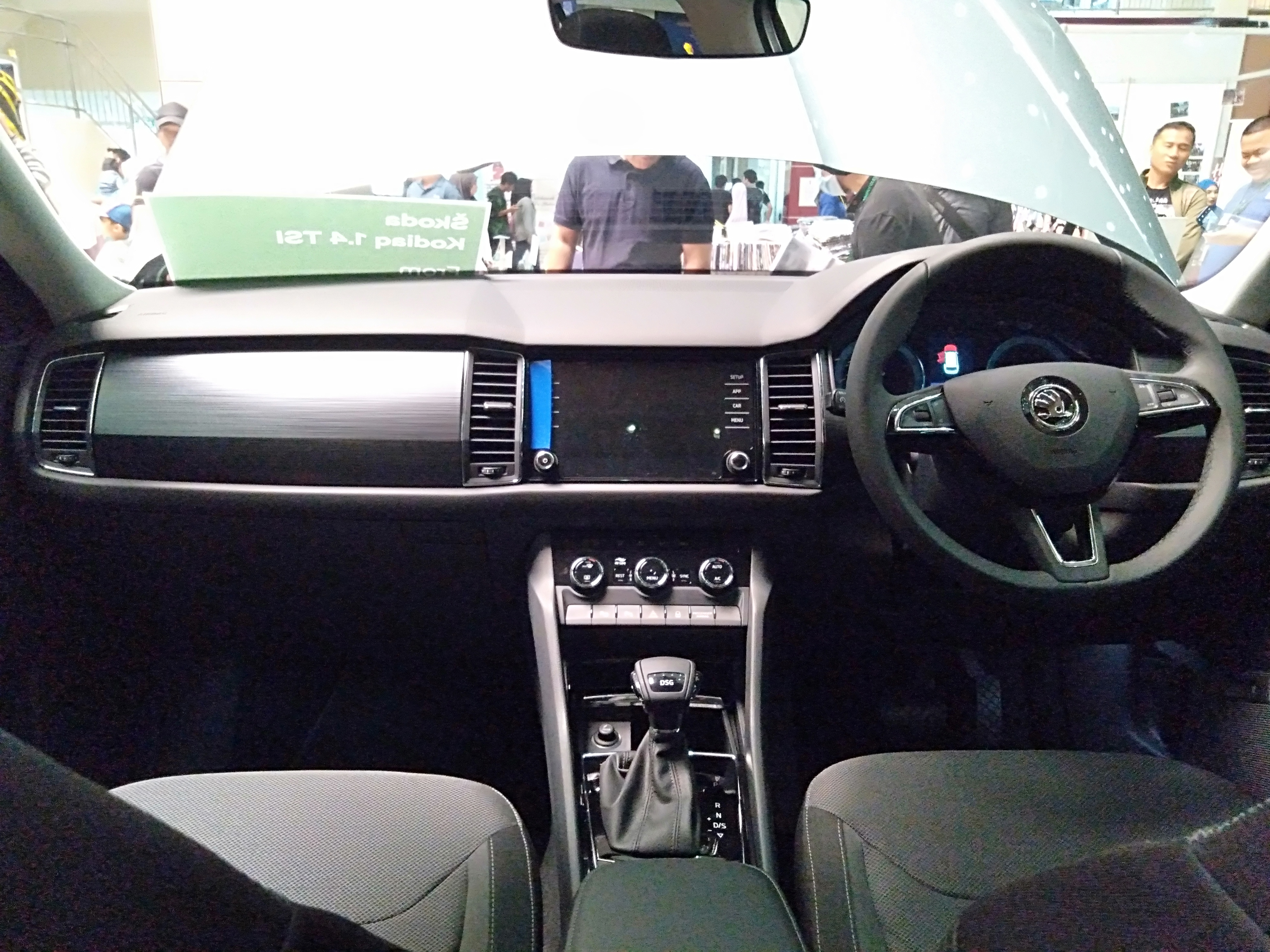
Interior

=== Facelift ===
In April 2021, Škoda launched a lightly facelifted version of the Kodiaq. Subtle cosmetic changes were introduced, including a redesigned hood and a more upright front grille, with slimmer front headlights that employ matrix LED technology as optional equipment. The changes made serve a functional purpose in making the Kodiaq more aerodynamic than before, by tweaking the bumpers and installing a new roof-mounted spoiler. The facelifted Kodiaq can be had with a choice of 17- to 20-inch wheels and some variants have been updated for the sake of reducing drag, while the high-performance Kodiaq RS rides on a new set of 20-inch polished wheels finished in metallic black and equipped with aero plastic shields. The 2.0 BiTDI 240 PS (177 kW) powerplant offered with the RS was replaced by the 2.0 TSI 245 PS (180 kW) engine that was also found in the Volkswagen Tiguan.

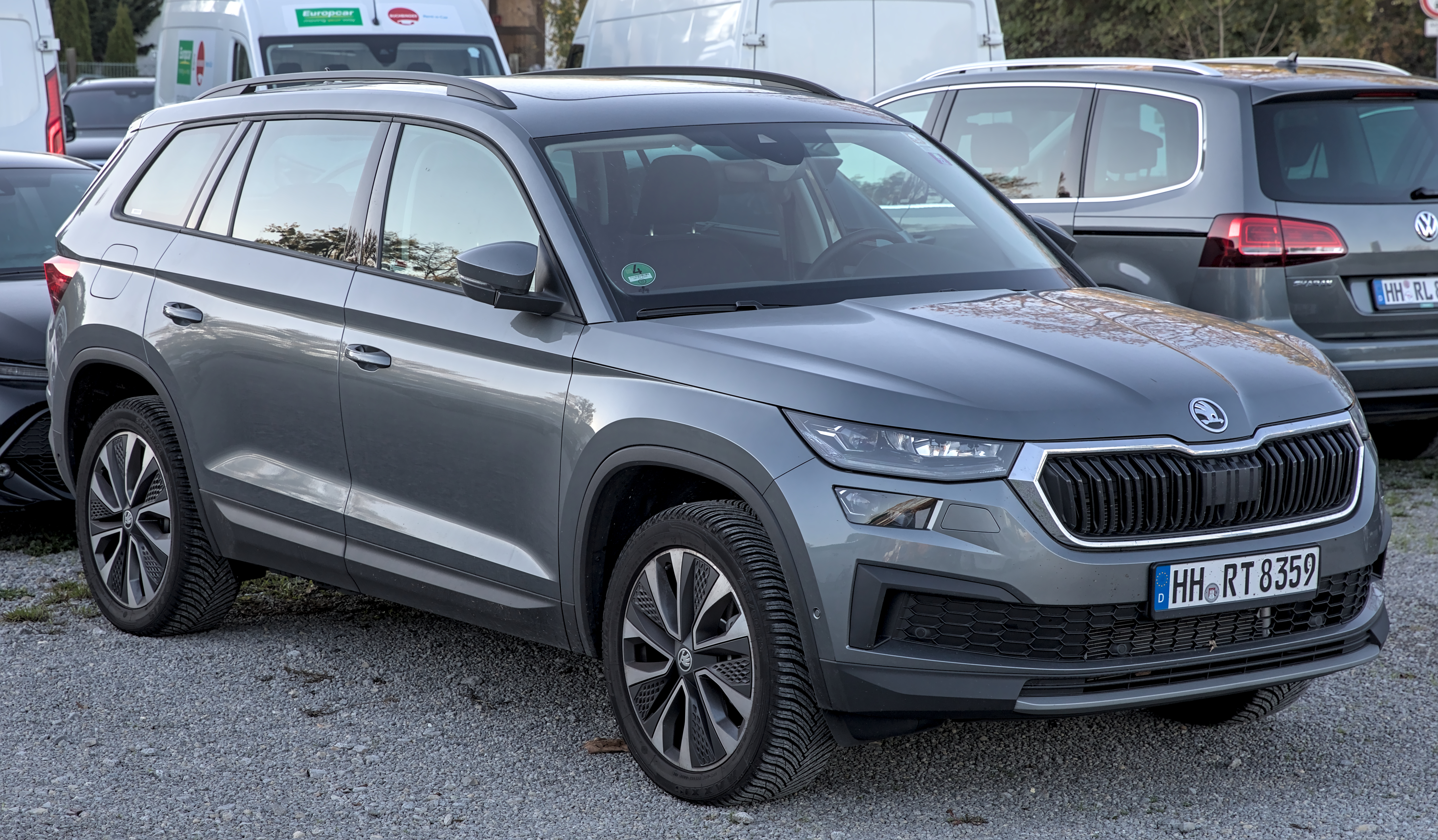
Škoda Kodiaq (facelift)

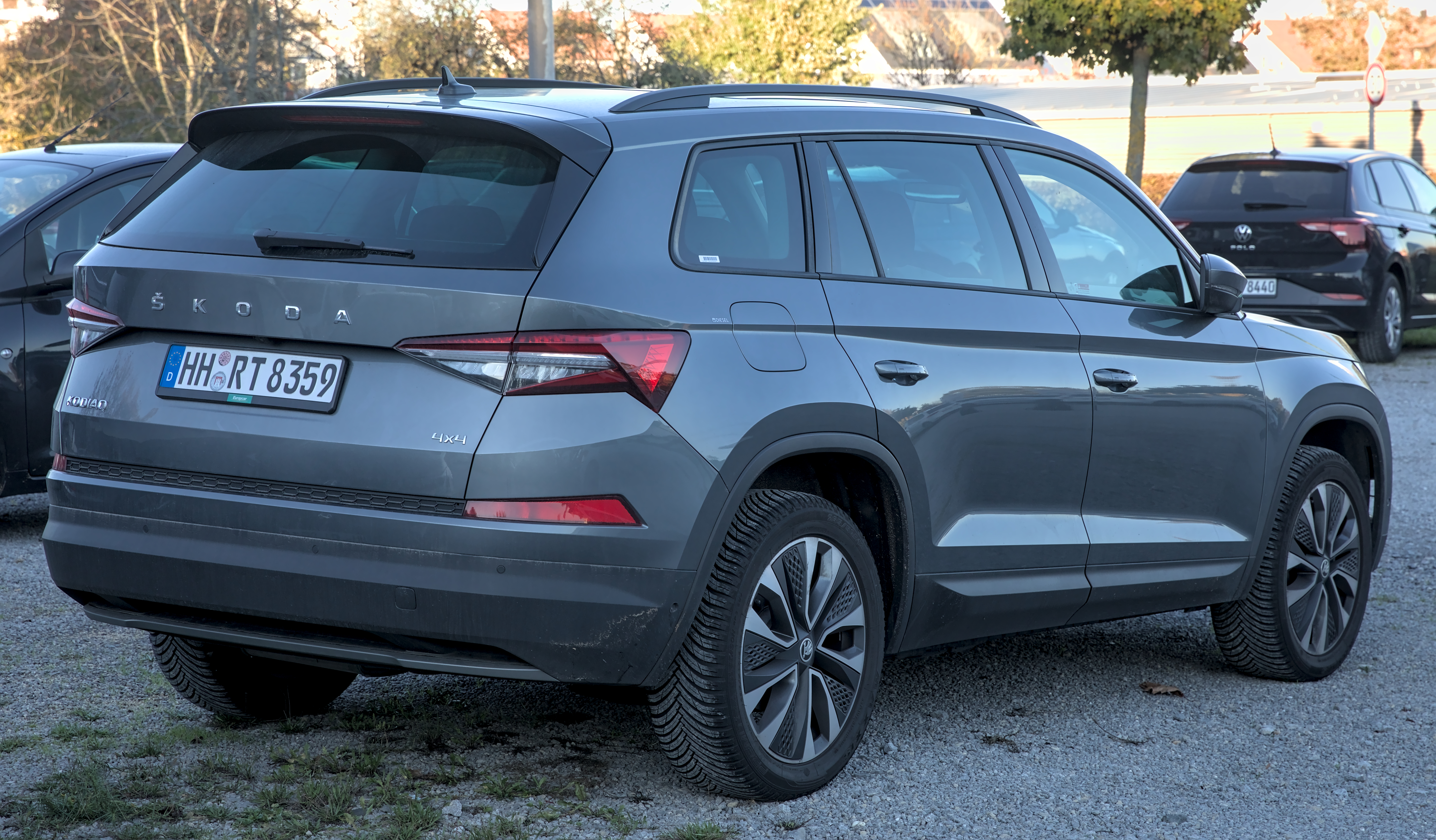
Škoda Kodiaq (facelift)

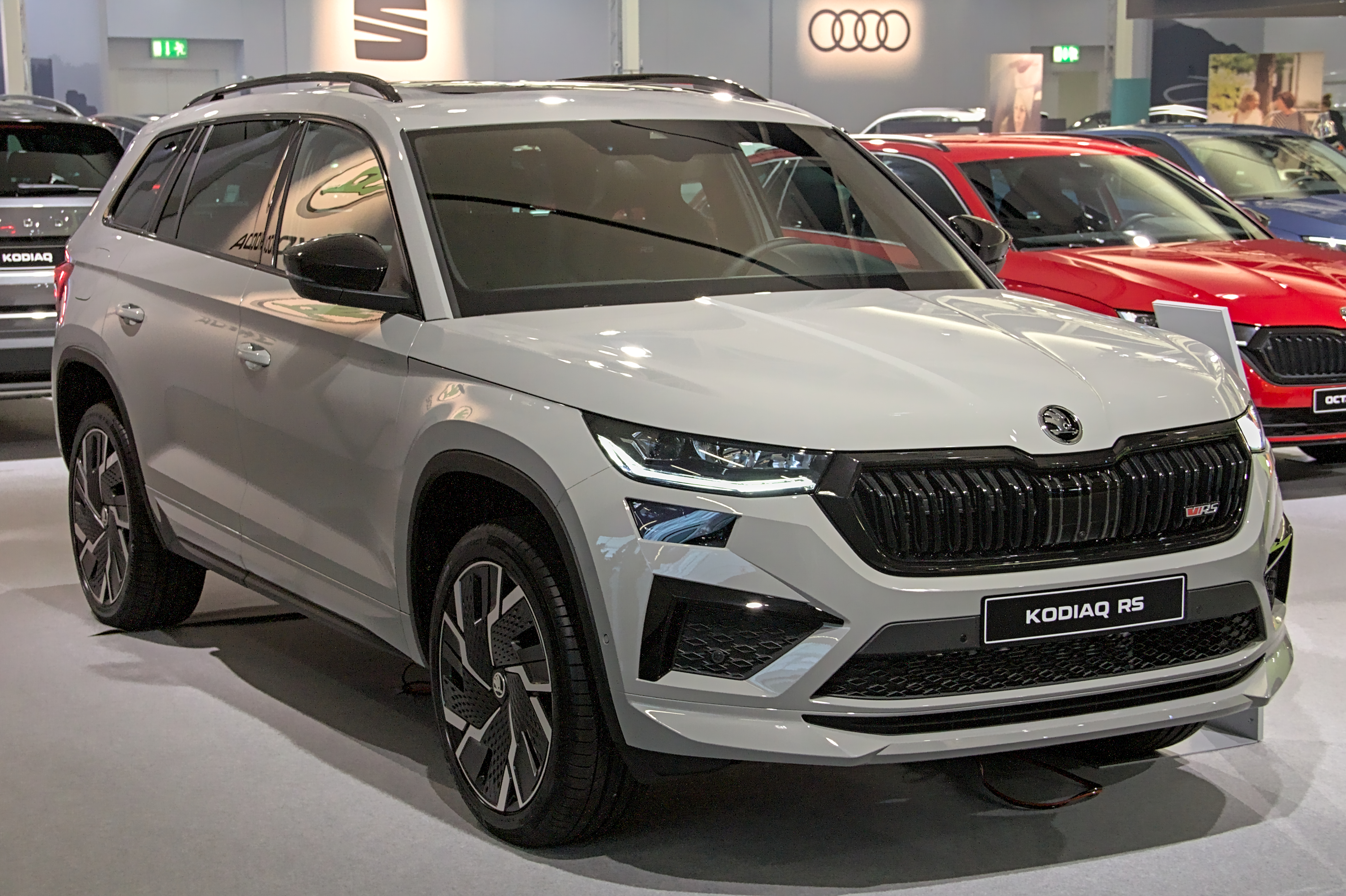
Škoda Kodiaq RS (facelift)

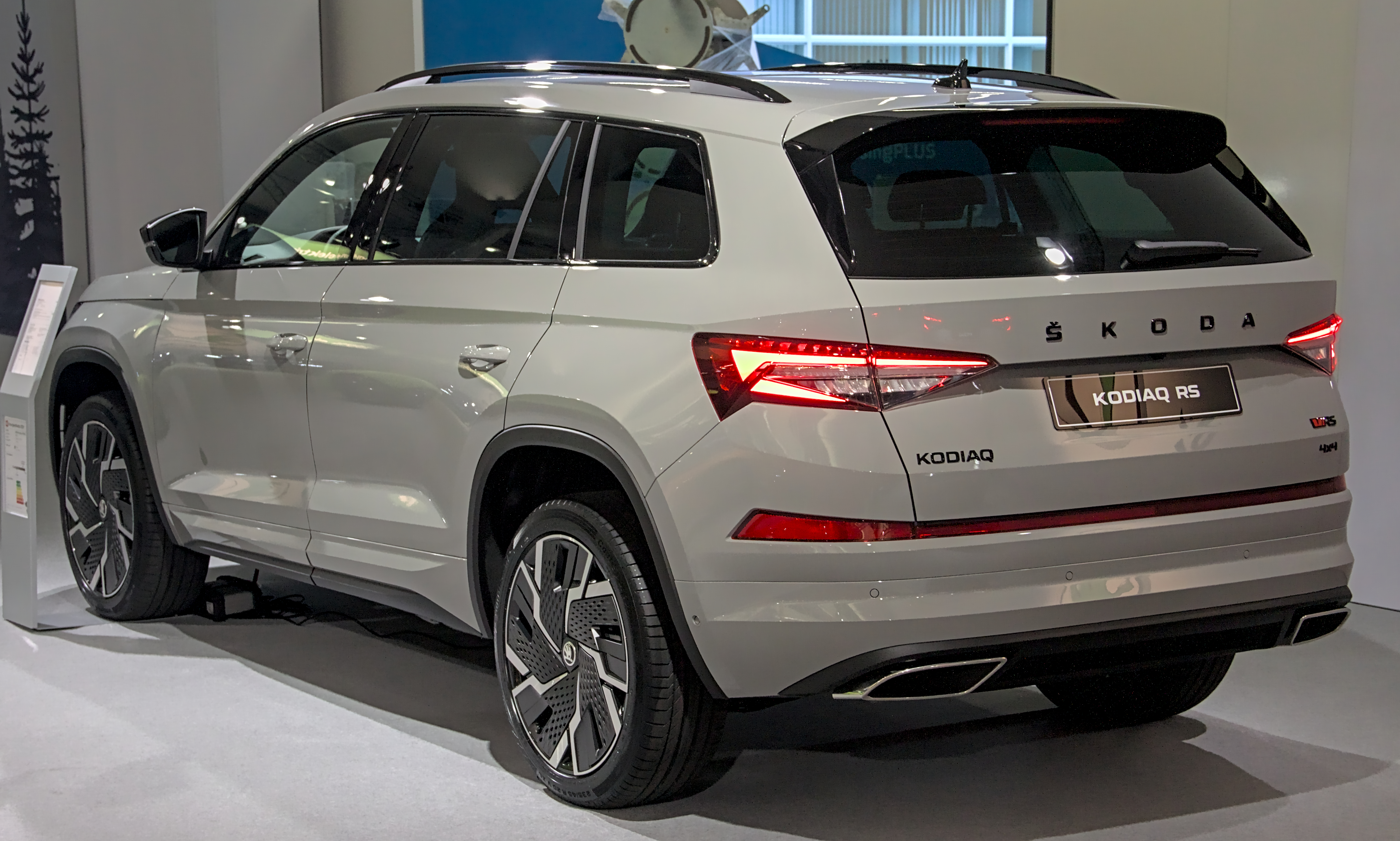
Škoda Kodiaq RS (facelift)

=== Scout, Sportline, RS and GT ===
The new Kodiaq Scout and Kodiaq Sportline were introduced at the Geneva Motor Show in March 2017. Kodiaq Scout ground clearance has gone up from 187 to 194 mm (7.4 to 7.6 in), with several design changes. These changes include front and rear underbody protection with bumper trim, silver mirror caps, and badging on the front wing and the glove compartment. The Scout comes in all-wheel drive with one turbo petrol TSI engines and two turbo diesel TDI engines. Kodiaq Sportline brings new styling tweaks, some parts are made in black, sports seats, steering wheel in leather, big alloy wheels and pedals made from aluminium.

The Kodiaq RS (vRS in the United Kingdom) was introduced at the Paris Motor Show in October 2018. It is at the top of the range, the fastest Kodiaq and the most expensive Škoda available. It includes the Škoda's most powerful diesel engine, the 2.0-litre bi-turbo diesel engine, which produces a maximum output of 240 PS (237 hp; 177 kW) and a maximum torque of 500 N⋅m (369 lbf⋅ft). The Kodiaq RS has got a more aggressive design, from leather and carbon leather are made the sports upholstered seats, steering wheel, the door threshold and the entrance rails of the doors. It comes with Virtual Cockpit, a gloss black grille, 20" alloy wheels Xtreme, 17-inch red painted brake calipers, different front and rear bumper designs, heated front sports seats and full LED headlights. It holds the track record at the Nürburgring for any seven seat SUV. Since 2019, the British Police have used Škoda Kodiaq vRS as police cars.

The Kodiaq GT is the coupé version of the Kodiaq for the Chinese market. It was introduced at the Guangzhou Motor Show on 16 November 2018. It is sold only in China, and is available with two 2.0-litre petrol engines (137 kW and 162 kW).

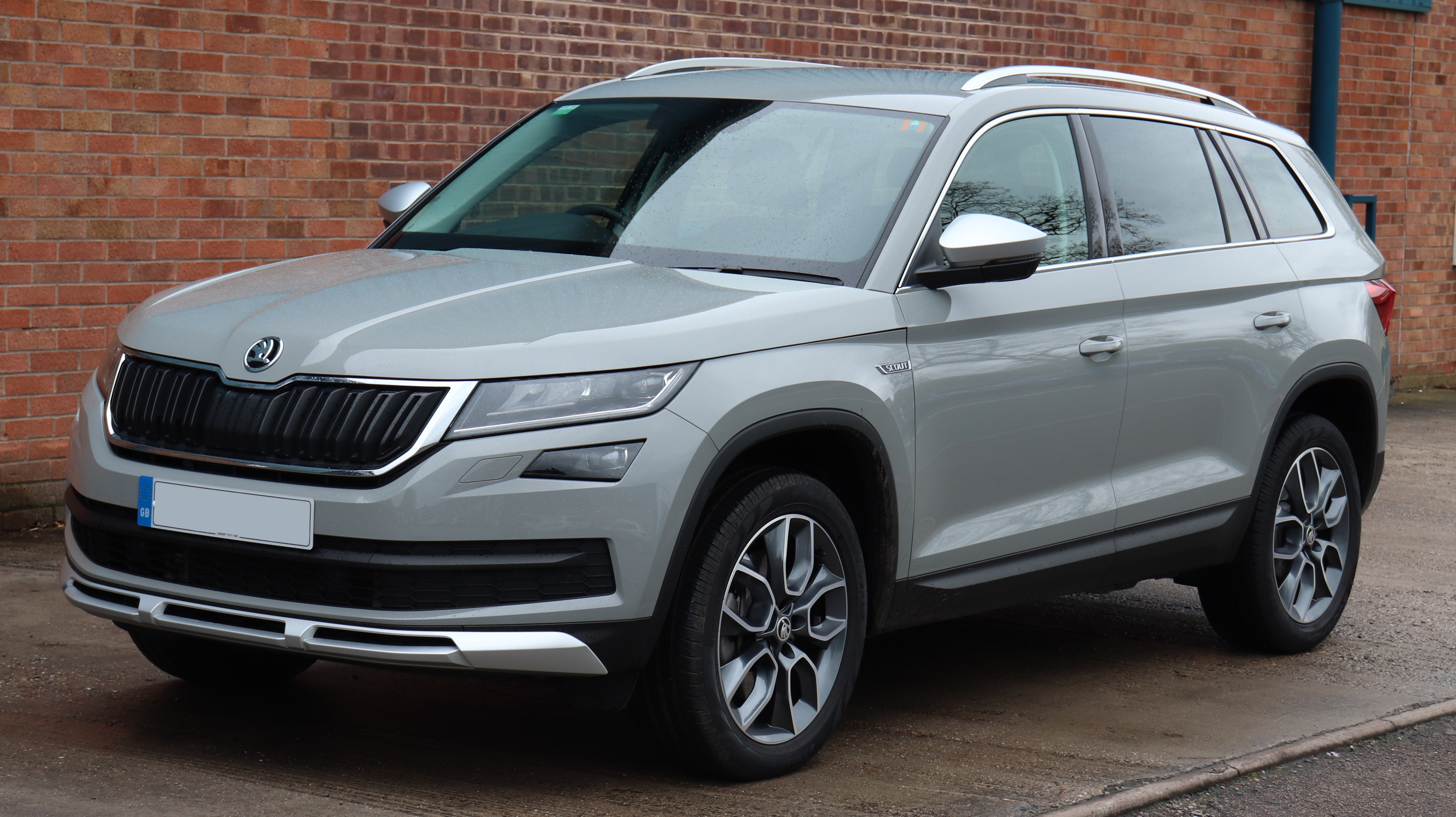
Škoda Kodiaq Scout

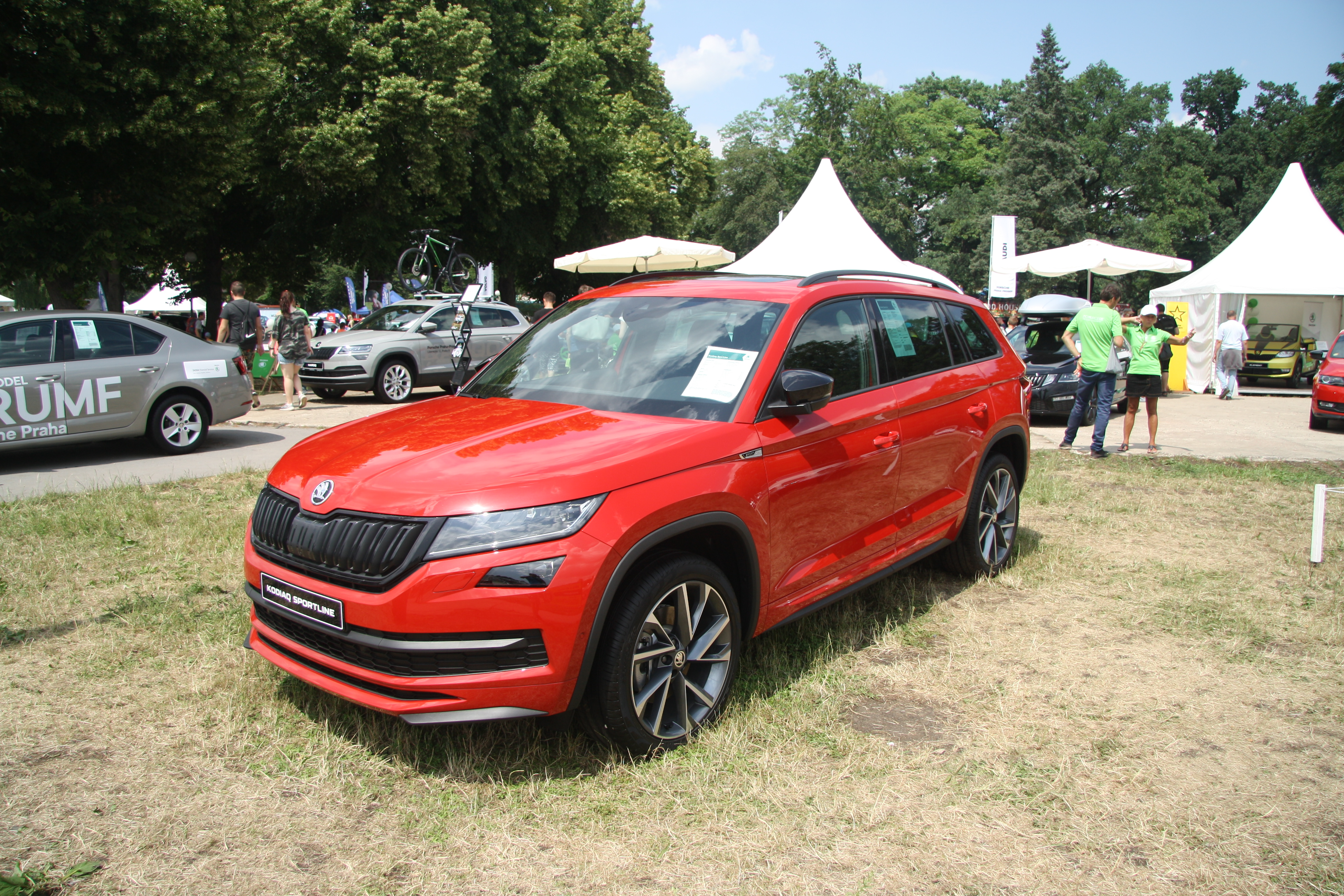
Škoda Kodiaq Sportline

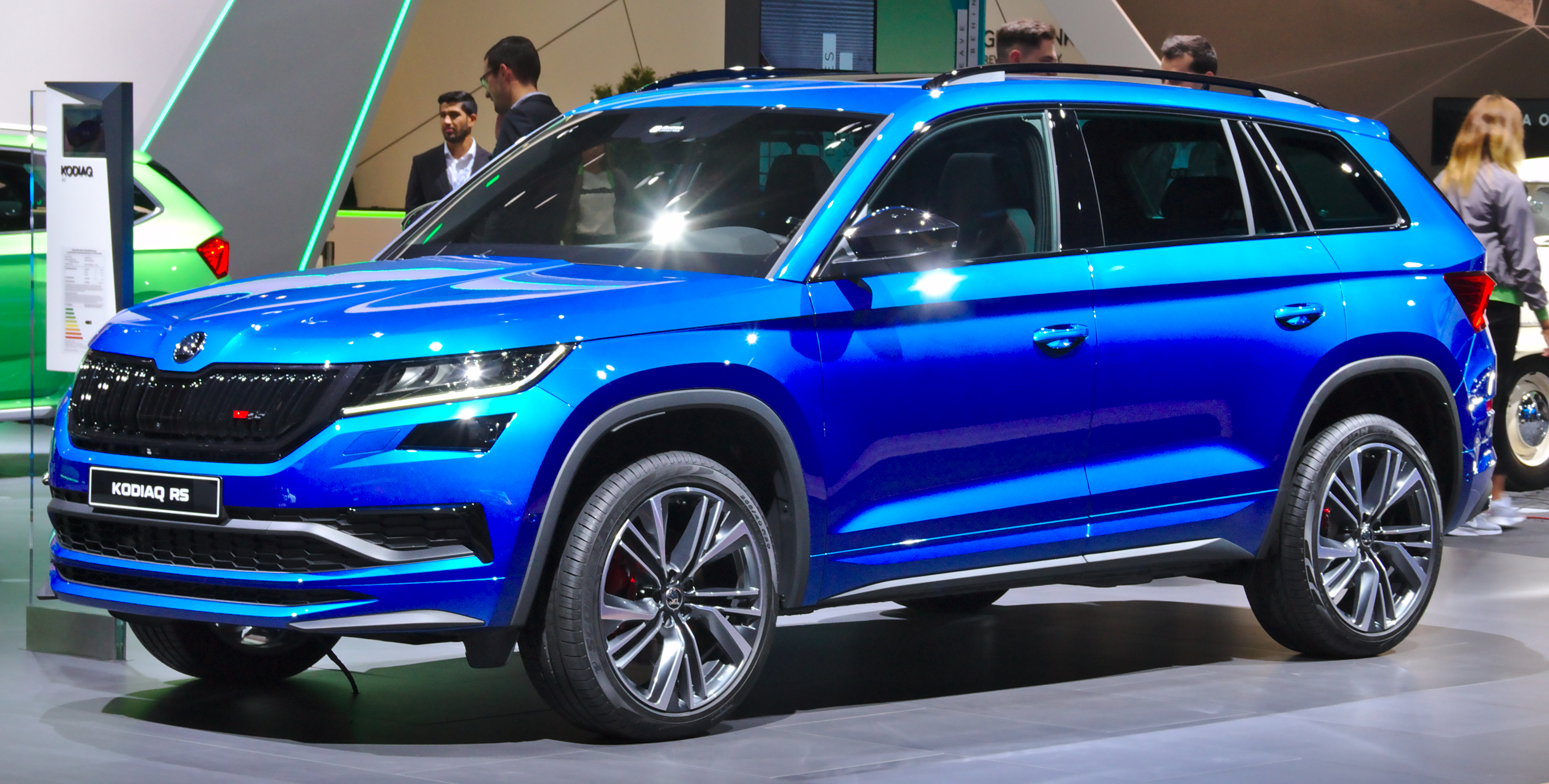
Škoda Kodiaq RS

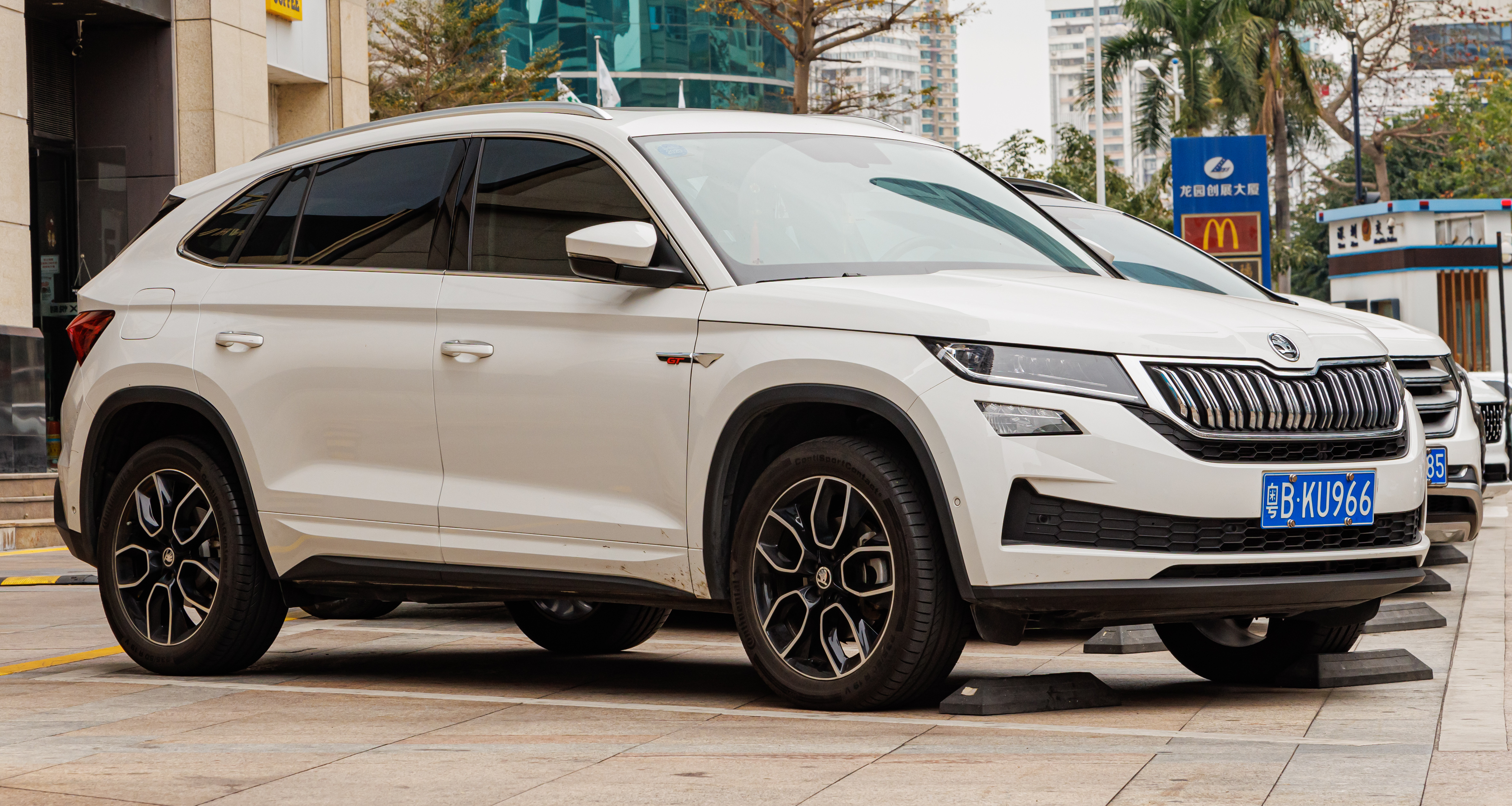
Škoda Kodiaq GT (China)

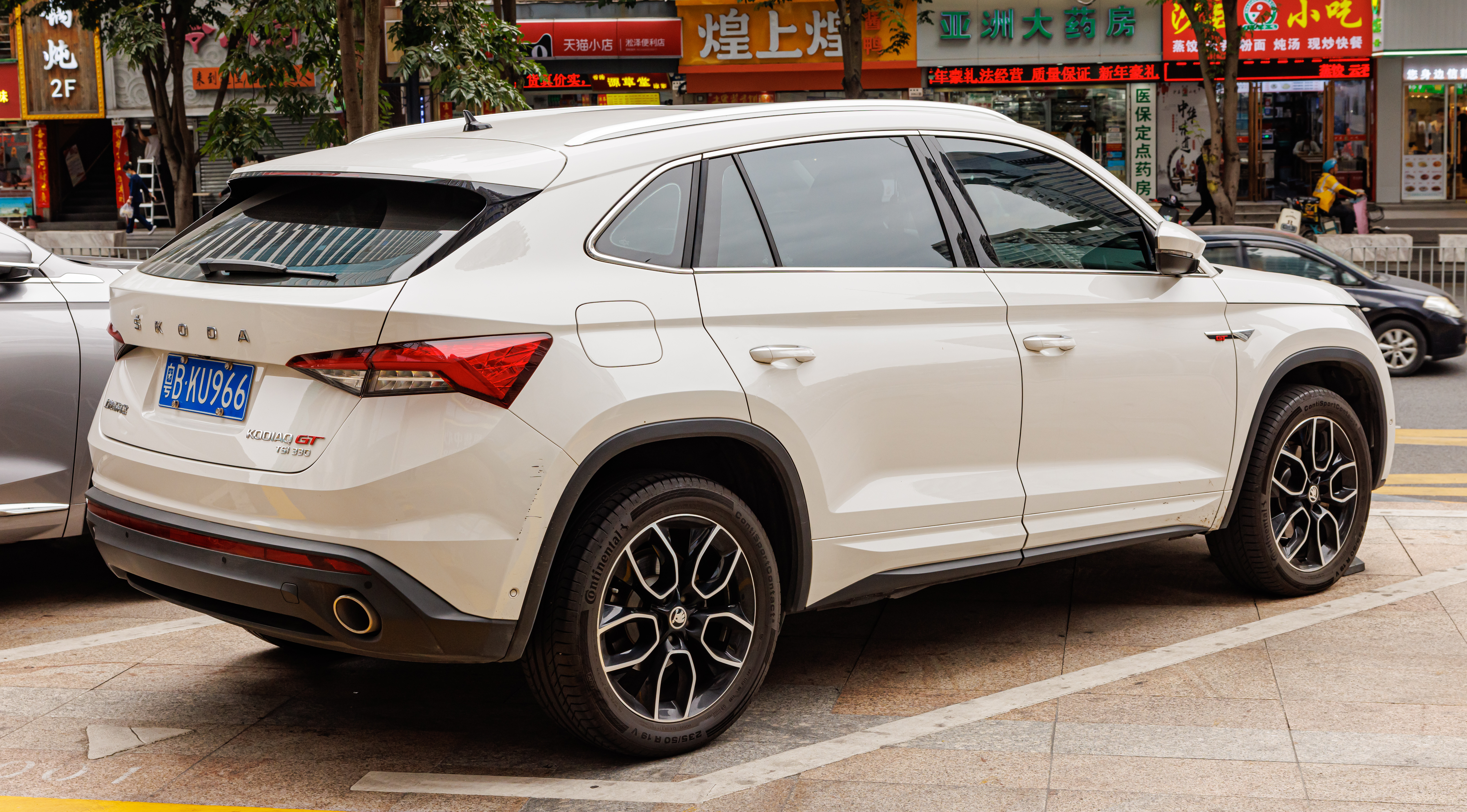
Škoda Kodiaq GT (China)

=== Powertrain ===
The first-generation Kodiaq was offered with turbocharged four-cylinder petrol and diesel engines ranging from 1.4 to 2.0 litres. Depending on the version, it was available with front-wheel drive or all-wheel drive, paired with a six-speed manual transmission or a six- or seven-speed DSG transmission.

Engine	Power kW (PS)	Torque Nm	Transmission	Drive
Petrol engines
1.4 TSI	92 (125)	200	6-speed manual	Front
1.4 TSI	110 (150)	250	6-speed DSG	Front
1.4 TSI	110 (150)	250	6-speed manual or 6-speed DSG	All-wheel
1.5 TSI	110 (150)	250	6-speed manual or 7-speed DSG	Front
1.5 TSI	110 (150)	250	7-speed DSG	All-wheel
2.0 TSI	132 (180)	320	7-speed DSG	All-wheel
2.0 TSI	140 (190)	320	7-speed DSG	All-wheel
2.0 TSI RS	180 (245)	370	7-speed DSG	All-wheel
Diesel engines
2.0 TDI	85 (115)	320	6-speed manual	Front
2.0 TDI	110 (150)	340	7-speed DSG	Front
2.0 TDI	110 (150)	340	6-speed manual or 7-speed DSG	All-wheel
2.0 TDI	110 (150)	360	7-speed DSG	Front or all-wheel
2.0 TDI	140 (190)	400	7-speed DSG	All-wheel
2.0 TDI	147 (200)	400	7-speed DSG	All-wheel
2.0 BiTDI RS	176 (240)	500	7-speed DSG	All-wheel

=== Safety ===
Euro NCAP test results Škoda Kodiaq 2.0 TDI Ambition (LHD) (2017)
Test	Points	%
Overall:	5 /5 stars	
Adult occupant:	35.3	92%
Child occupant:	38.2	77%
Pedestrian:	30	71%
Safety assist:	6.5	54%

ANCAP test results Skoda Kodiaq all 4x4 variants including RS (2017, aligned with Euro NCAP)
Test	Points	%
Overall:	5 /5 stars	
Adult occupant:	35.2	92%
Child occupant:	38.2	77%
Pedestrian:	26	62%
Safety assist:	6.5	54%

== Second generation (2024) ==
Second generation
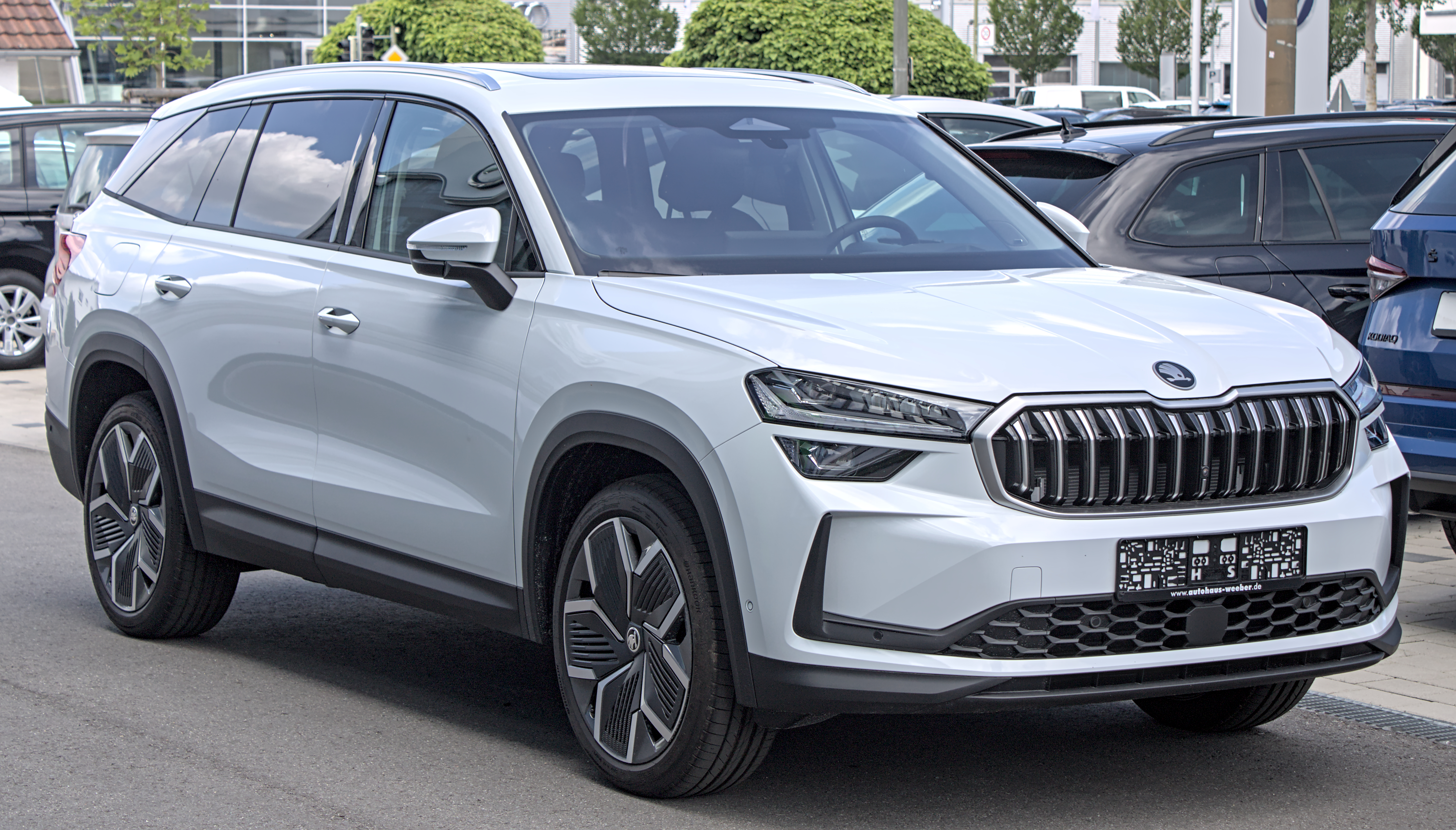

Overview
- Production: January 2024–present
- Assembly: Czech Republic: Kvasiny; India: Aurangabad (Škoda India)

Body and chassis
- Body style: 5-door crossover SUV
- Layout: Front-engine, front-wheel-drive; Front-engine, all-wheel-drive
- Platform: Volkswagen Group MQB Evo
- Related: Audi Q3 FJ; Cupra Terramar; Volkswagen Tiguan Mk3; Volkswagen Tayron Mk2

Powertrain
- Engine: Petrol: 1.5 L TSI I4 mild hybrid; 2.0 L TSI I4; Petrol plug-in hybrid: 1.5 L TSI I4 (Kodiaq iV); Diesel: 2.0 L TDI I4
- Transmission: 6-speed DSG (Kodiaq iV); 7-speed DSG

Dimensions
- Wheelbase: 2,791 mm (109.9 in)
- Length: 4,758 mm (187.3 in)
- Width: 1,864 mm (73.4 in)
- Height: 1,659 mm (65.3 in)

The second-generation Kodiaq was unveiled on 4 October 2023, with production starting at Kvasiny in January 2024. Built on the Volkswagen Group's MQB Evo platform, it is 61 mm (2.4 in) longer than its predecessor at 4,758 mm (187.3 in), although its wheelbase is unchanged. Five- and seven-seat versions are offered, depending on the powertrain.

The redesigned dashboard has a 10-inch touchscreen, with a 13-inch version available as an option. Below it are three rotary controls with integrated displays, known as Smart Dials. The gear selector was moved from the centre console to the steering column.

Petrol and diesel engines remain available, alongside the Kodiaq's first mild-hybrid and plug-in hybrid powertrains. The plug-in hybrid, sold as the Kodiaq iV, combines a 1.5-litre petrol engine with an electric motor for a total output of 150 kW (200 PS; 200 hp). It supports AC and DC charging and has a claimed WLTP electric range of more than 100 km (62 mi). The iV is offered only with five seats and front-wheel drive.

The RS version, unveiled in October 2024, uses a 195 kW (265 PS) 2.0-litre turbocharged petrol engine and all-wheel drive.

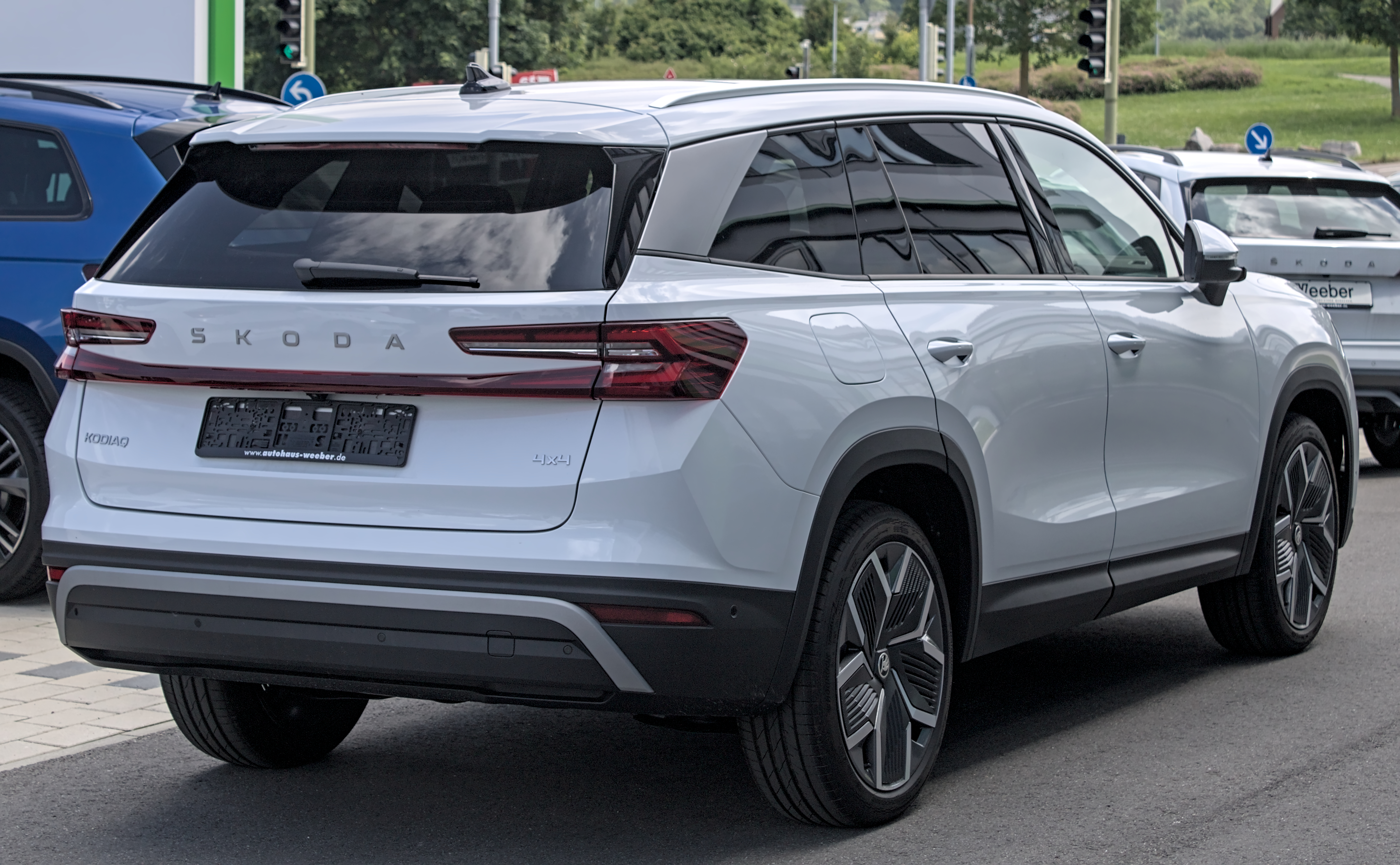
Rear view

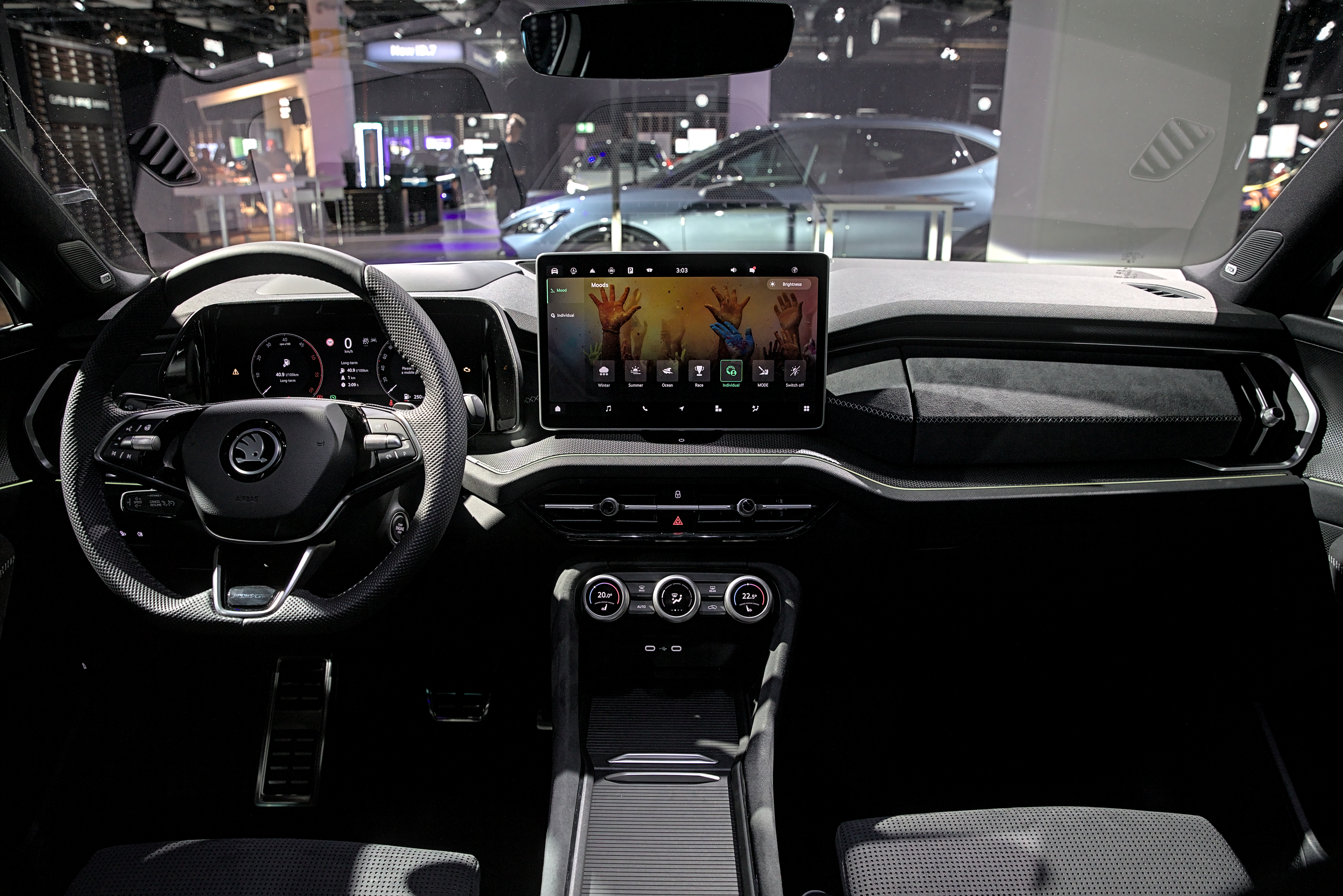
Interior

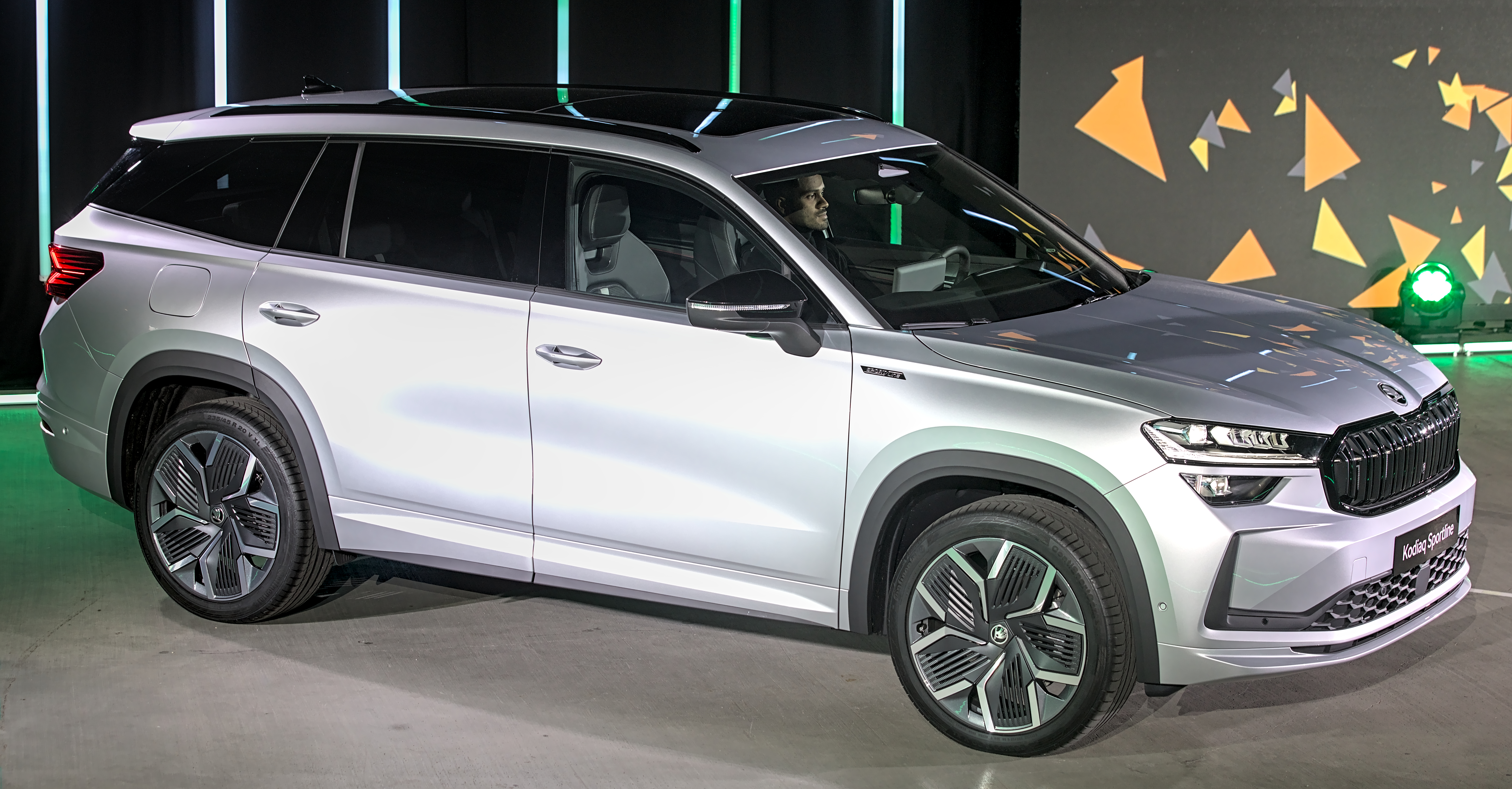
Škoda Kodiaq Sportline

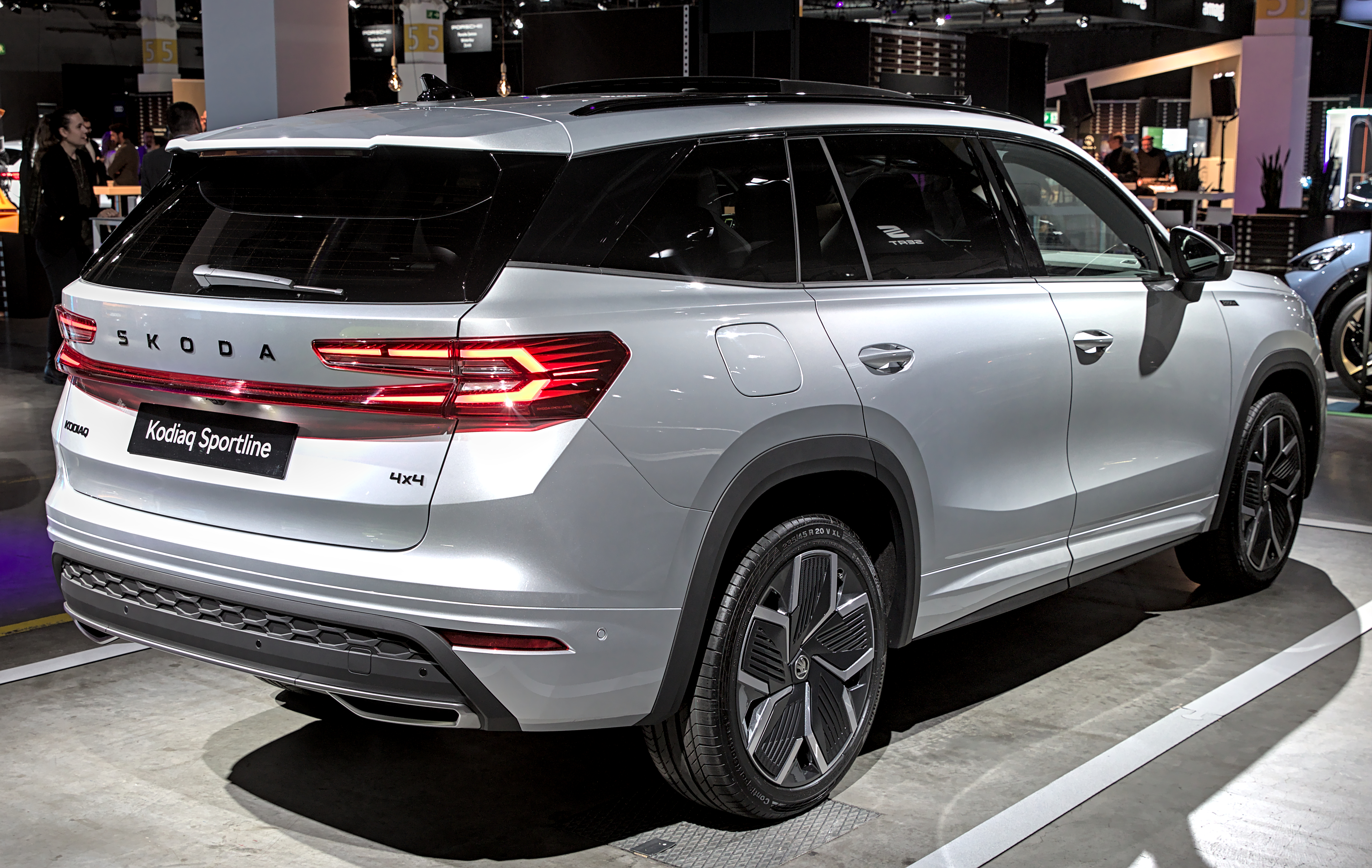
Rear view

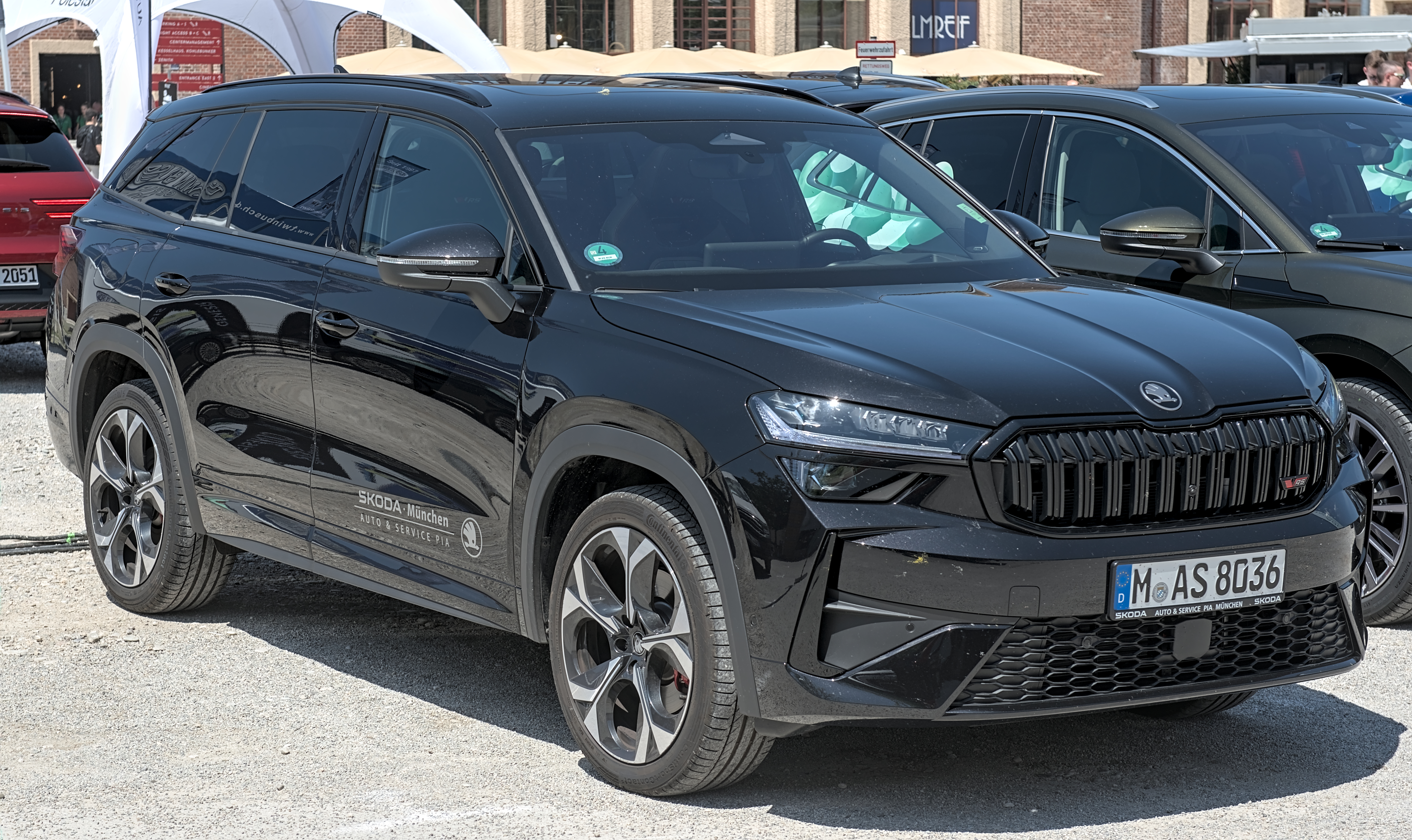
Škoda Kodiaq RS

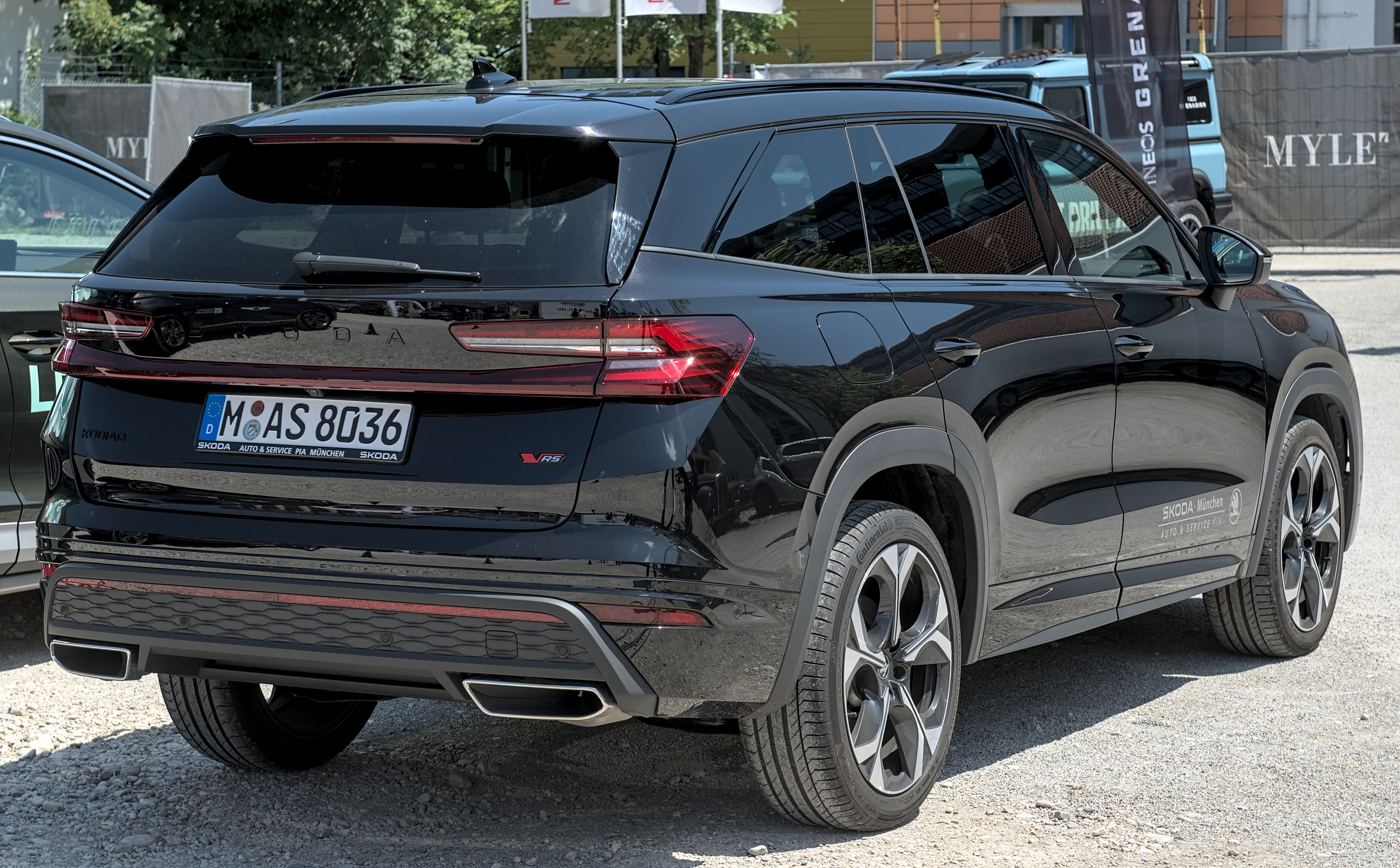
Rear view

=== Powertrain ===
Engine	Power kW (PS)	Torque Nm	Transmission	Drive
Petrol engines
1.5 TSI mild hybrid	110 (150)	250	7-speed DSG	Front
2.0 TSI	150 (204)	320	7-speed DSG	All-wheel
2.0 TSI RS	195 (265)	400	7-speed DSG	All-wheel
Plug-in hybrid
1.5 TSI iV	150 (204)*	350	6-speed DSG	Front
Diesel engines
2.0 TDI	110 (150)	360	7-speed DSG	Front
2.0 TDI	142 (193)	400	7-speed DSG	All-wheel

- Combined system output.

=== Safety ===
Euro NCAP test results Škoda Kodiaq 2.0 TDI Selection (LHD) (2024)
Test	Points	%
Overall:	5 /5 stars	
Adult occupant:	35.7	89%
Child occupant:	40.9	83%
Pedestrian:	51.7	82%
Safety assist:	14.2	78%

ANCAP test results Skoda Kodiaq (2024, aligned with Euro NCAP)
Test	Points	%
Overall:	5 /5 stars	
Adult occupant:	35.66	89%
Child occupant:	42.94	87%
Pedestrian:	51.73	82%
Safety assist:	14.69	81%

== Awards ==
In November 2016, the Škoda Kodiaq was named the "Best Family Car in the World" by Top Gear Magazine. Kodiaq won the title of the "Car of the Year" 2017 in the Czech Republic, Poland and Bulgaria, the SUV of the Year in China and France, and the all wheel drive car in Germany.

The Kodiaq also won in German magazine competition Auto Test for 2017, and is the winner of competitions in British magazines Auto Express and What Car? for 2017. The Kodiaq also received the Red Dot Design Award for 2017.

The Kodiaq won the title of 'Best Large Family Car' at the 2024 Carbuyer Best Car Awards.

== Sales ==
Year	Global (production)	Europe	China	India
2016	1,167	671		
2017	123,982	53,967	44,458	
2018	155,499	63,990	51,230	2,025
2019	177,163	88,516	40,067	1,719
2020	117,825	69,516	17,693	
2021	88,505		1,545	
2022	100,164		5,269	
2023	107,323		2,855	
2024			2,405	
2025			929	
