= Audi Hungaria =

Automotive Manufacturing Plant

Coordinates: 47.698°N 17.690°E

Audi Hungaria Zrt.
- Type: Private (subsidiary)
- Industry: Automotive
- Founded: 1993; 33 years ago
- Founder: Audi
- Headquarters: Győr, Hungary
- Area served: Europe
- Products: Automobiles
- Revenue: 7,377,000,000 (2018)
- Net income: 425,200,000 (2018)
- Number of employees: 13,084 (2018)
- Parent: Audi
- Website: audi.hu

Audi Hungaria Zrt. is the Hungarian subsidiary of Audi, the world's largest engine factory. It was founded in 1993 with a share capital of 2 million Deutsche Mark (DM). The company is managed by 5 board members, the supervisory board and the general assembly. Its field of activity is engines and engine components, as well as automobile production, which it employs more than eleven thousand employees (2015). Audi's investments in Győr so far have exceeded 8 billion euros.

== History ==
Audi Hungaria was founded in 1993 as Audi Hungaria Motor Kft. The engine factory was inaugurated a year later. Automobile production began in 1998 with the assembly of the Audi TT Coupé. There were also the TT Roadster (from 1999), Audi A3 and S3 (2001–2003), Audi A3 Cabriolet (from 2007) and Audi RS 3 Sportback (from 2010). The painted bodies for final assembly came from Ingolstadt.

By 2013, Audi had invested 5.7 billion euros in the site. This made Audi the largest foreign investor in Hungary up to that point. In 2013 the new vehicle plant in Győr was inaugurated. Since then, the A3 sedan and cabriolet, and since 2014 the TT coupé and roadster, have been completely manufactured here. In 2015, 2,022,520 engines and 160,206 automobiles were produced at Audi Hungaria Motor. This means that almost all engines for Audi vehicles were manufactured in Győr in 2016.

In January 2016 it was announced that the new generation of the Audi Q3 would be produced in Győr. At the beginning of 2017, Audi Hungaria Motor Kft. merged with its parent company (Audi Hungaria Services Zrt.) as part of a corporate restructuring. They thus changed their name to Audi Hungaria Zrt. In addition, Audi has set up three chairs at the Széchenyi István University in Győr. In April 2017, Audi announced that it would produce the Q3 Sportback in Győr in 2019.

The third generation Audi Q3 will be built alongside a closely related sibling, the new Cupra Terramar.
