= Gyula Kautz =

Hungarian politician (1829–1909)

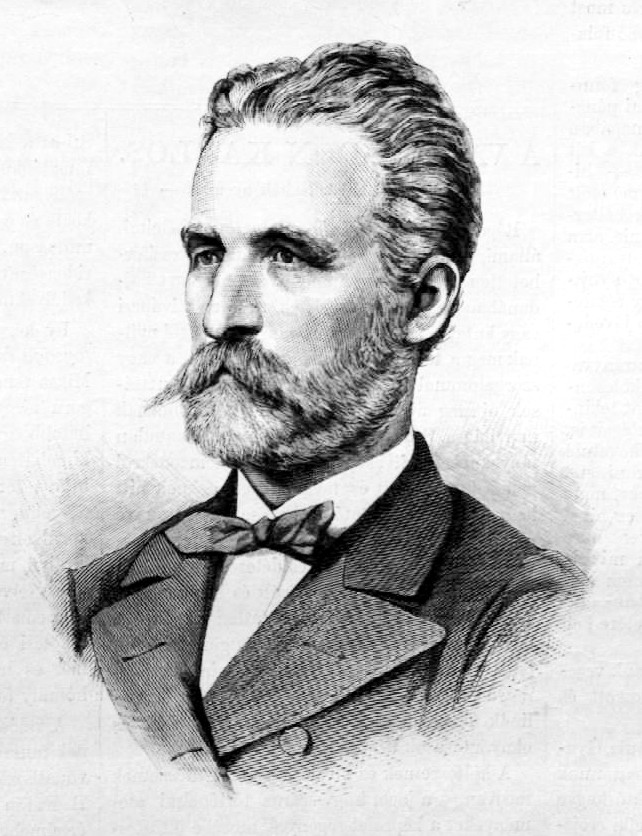
Gyula Kautz

Gyula Kautz (5 November 1829 – 27 March 1909) was a notable Hungarian economist. The Faculty of Economics at the Széchenyi István University holds his name.

== Education ==
Born in Győr, he started his University studies at the Royal Academy of Philosophy at Győr. After two academic years, he moved to Pest to study at the University of Pest, where he earned his doctorate in law in 1850. He then went on to study abroad for a year, visiting universities of Berlin, Heidelberg and Leipzig.

He was influenced by the English classical school of Economics, and also by Wilhelm Roscher, then a professor at Leipzig, a representative of the German historian school.

== Academia ==
He started his academic career in 1851, with an assistant lecturer position at the Royal Academy of Justice at Pozsony. He moved to work as a regular teacher at the Royal Academy of Justice at Nagyvárad in 1853. His subject was the Austrian financial law, then political economics. In 1858 he moved back to Pest to become a teacher of public law and public administration at the Technical University of Pest. He was teaching at the University of Pest from 1863 onwards.

He became the associate of the Hungarian Academy of Sciences in 1862, and he received regular membership in 1865. He was elected the dean of the Faculty of Justice and Administration at University of Pest for the 1872/1873 term, and he was the rector of the University of Pest in the 1873/1874.

From 1902 he was the chairman of the Hungarian Economic Association for 6 years. He held the position of the vice-chairman of the Hungarian Academy of Sciences from 1904 to 1907. He was the member of the Société d'Economie Politique in Paris and the Royal Statistical Society of London.

== Political career ==
Kautz held liberal views. He was the member of the Deák Party, and he belonged to the inner circle around Ferenc Deák. He was one of the key figures who prepared and developed the economic programme behind the Ausgleich. In 1865 he won Győr's seat in the Parliament, and he held this position for three consecutive terms, from 1865 to 1883. He was elected the permanent member of the Upper Chamber in 1885.

== Financial career ==
In 1883 he was named the Hungarian vice-governor of the Austro-Hungarian Bank, then the central bank of the Austro-Hungarian Monarchy. He was chosen to be the governor of the Austro-Hungarian Bank in 1892. He led the transition to the new currency, the Austro-Hungarian krone. He left his position at the Austro-Hungarian Bank in 1900, when the monetary reform was completed.

== Selected works ==
- 1858: (in German) Die National-Oekonomik als Wissenschaft (Theorie und Geschichte der National-Oekonomik. Propyläen zum volks- und staatswirtschaftlichen Studium; vol. 1). Wien : Gerold.
- 1860: (in German) Die geschichtliche Entwickelung der National-Oekonomik und ihrer Literatur (Theorie und Geschichte der National-Oekonomik. Propyläen zum volks- und staatswirtschaftlichen Studium; vol. 2). Wien : Gerold.
- 1890: (in Hungarian) A nemzetgazdaság és pénzügytan rendszere.
