= Széchenyi István University =

STEM-oriented university in Győr, Hungary

- Széchenyi István Egyetem
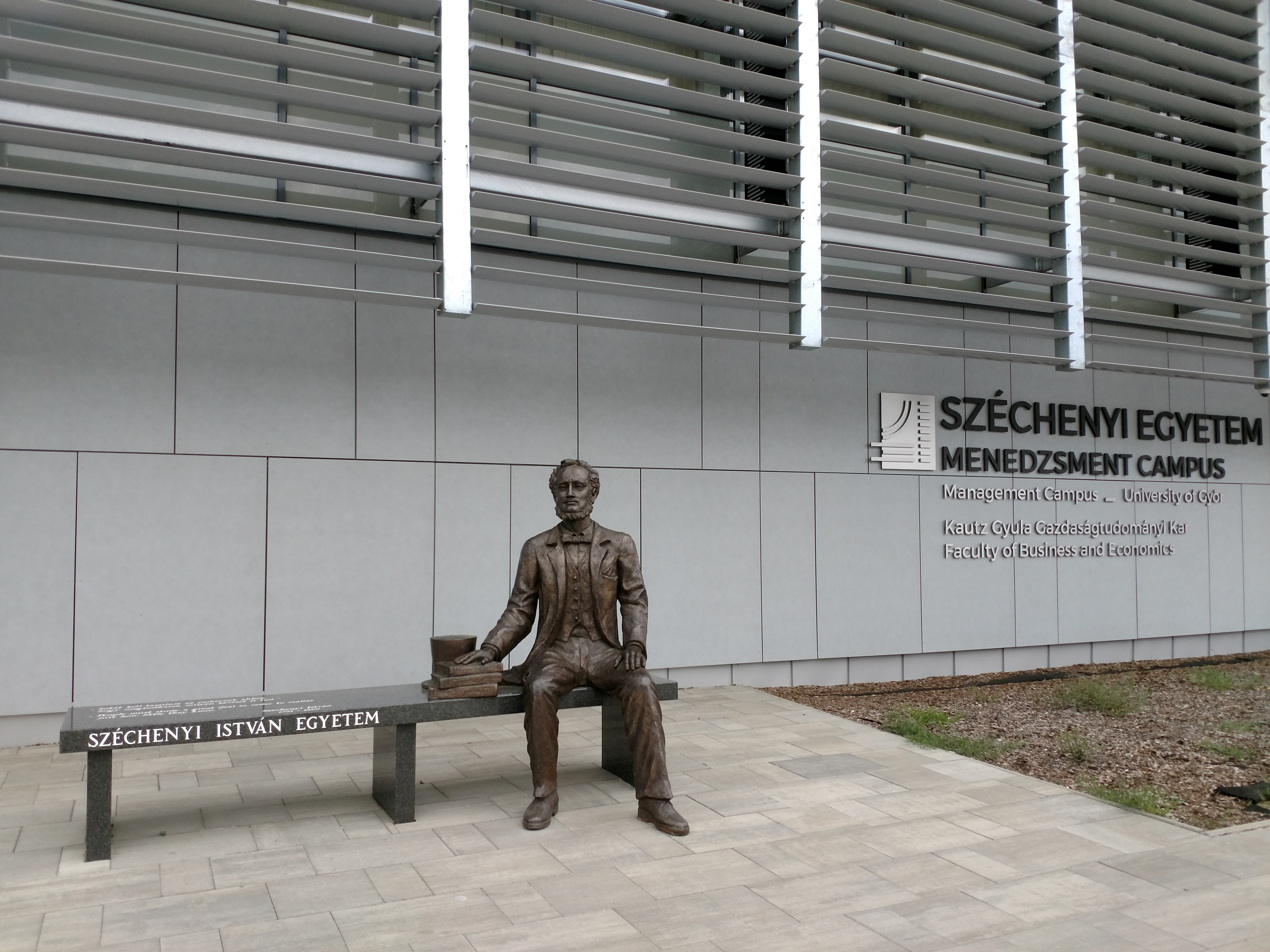
- Established: 1968; 58 years ago
- Rector: Péter Földesi
- Students: 15.000 (2016)
- Location: Győr, Hungary; 47°41′37″N 17°37′39″E
- Website: www.uni.sze.hu

University rankings

Regional – Overall
- QS Emerging Europe and Central Asia: 150 (2022)

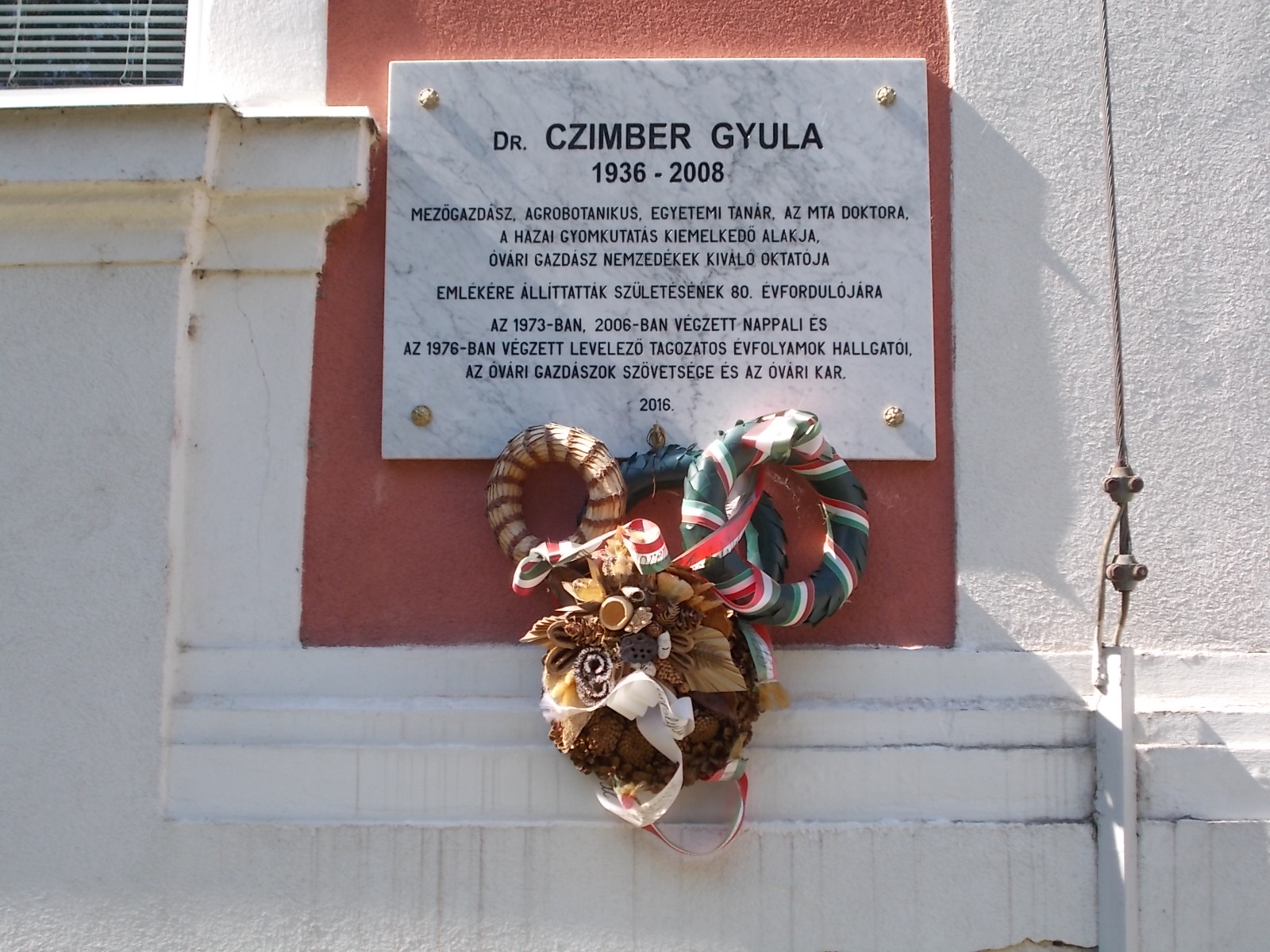
Plaque of Gyula Czimber.

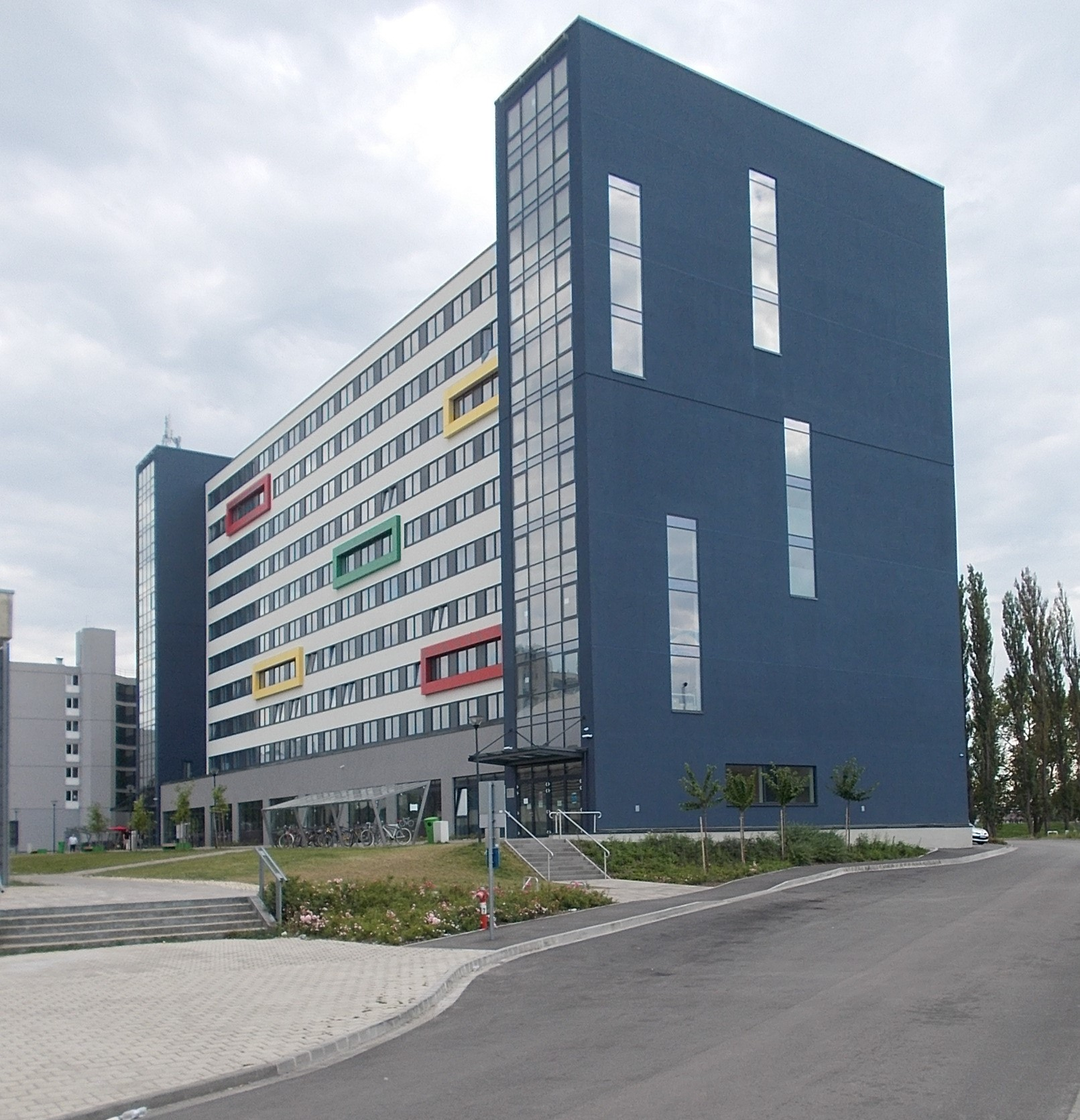
Multifunctional Building.

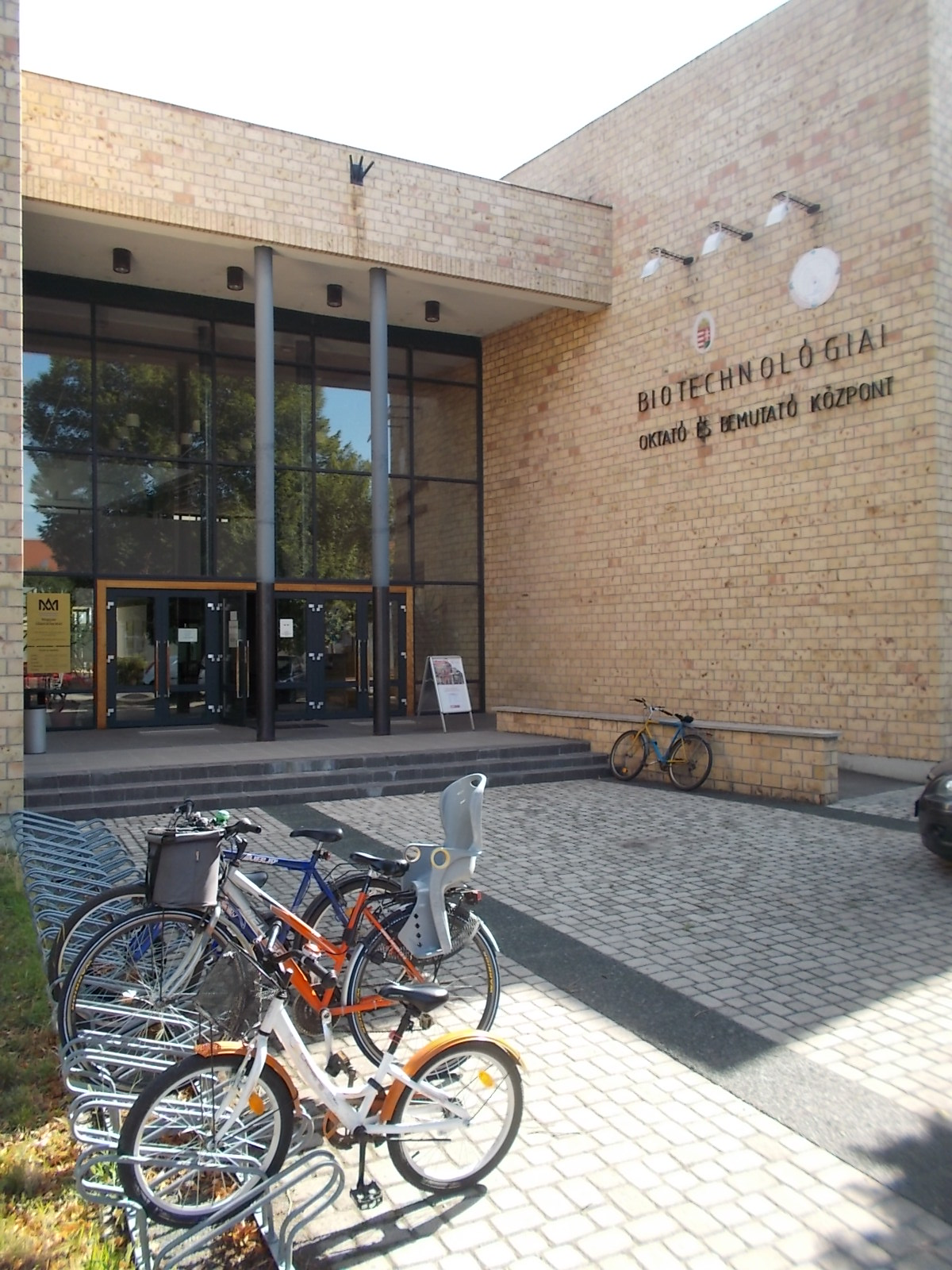
Faculty of Agricultural and Food Sciences

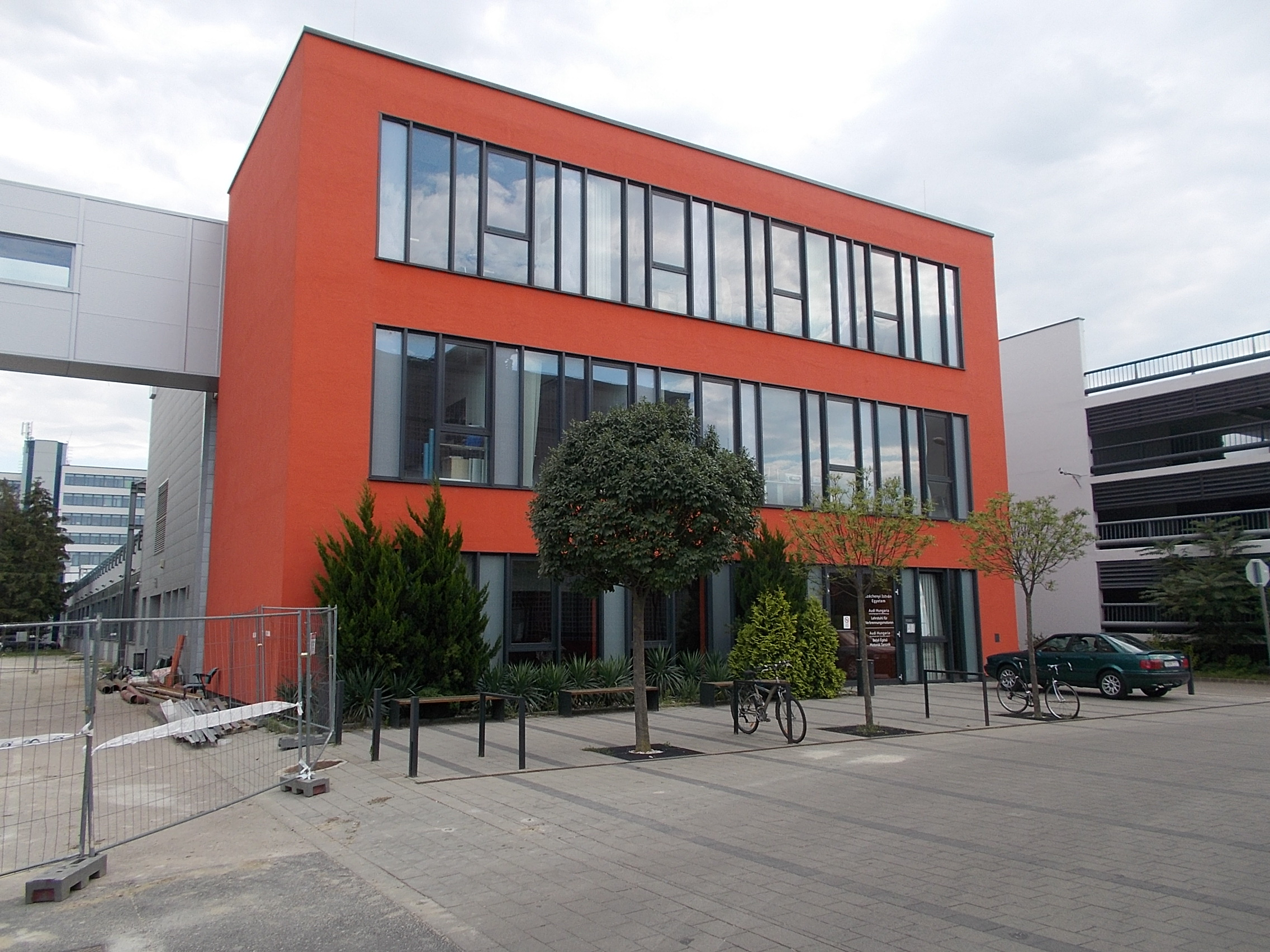
Building of the Audi Hungaria Faculty of Vehicle Engineering.

The Széchenyi István University (SZE), also known as the University of Győr, is a residential university established in 1968, and is described as a private institution having as its main campus a location on the Danube River, a short walk from the Győr, Hungary city centre. As of 2026, SZE has nine faculties serving in Győr, and at a second campus in Mosonmagyaróvár, Hungary. The university offers a variety of degrees through to the doctoral, with an emphasis on science, technology, and engineering, and it has a "strong commitment to internationali[s]ation" in its offering a large variety of English-taught programmes at all levels.

Audi Hungaria Kft has a collaborative program with SZE through its support of the "Audi Hungaria Faculty of Automotive Engineering", and as of 2026 has six professorships from pure through applied areas (e.g., materials science through automotive manufacturing), with Audi Hungaria staff being involved in research and teaching.

== History ==
In 1963 the government made a resolution to establish an architectural university. In 1968 the resolution was changed and the government wished to build a telecommunication university. The university's predecessor in title, the Transportation and Telecommunication Faculty of Technical Sciences, was established in this year. The faculty trained engineers for the transportation and telecommunication infrastructure. The building of the university was built on the bend of the Moson Danube within walking distance of the baroque city.

In the early 1990s the technical sciences, economical, medical and social programmes became in demand. In 1995 the Eötvös Loránd University set up a law programme there, allowing the juridical training to return to the city. Since 2002, it is its own programme at the university.

The institution has bore the name of Hungarian noble István Széchenyi since 1986. The university offers several BA/BSc and MA/MSc courses as well as doctoral courses.

== Organization ==
As of 2026, the university provides education at 9 faculties, and 4 doctoral schools, in two locations.

Faculties:

1. Apáczai Csere János Faculty of Humanities, Education and Social Sciences (SZE AK).
2. Audi Hungaria Faculty of Automotive Engineering
3. Deák Ferenc Faculty of Law and Political Sciences
4. Faculty of Agricultural and Food Sciences (its legal predecessor was established in 1818, the faculty joined the university in 2016)
5. Faculty of Architecture, Civil Engineering and Transport Sciences
6. Faculty of Art
7. Faculty of Health and Sport Sciences
8. Faculty of Mechanical Engineering, Informatics and Electrical Engineering
9. Kautz Gyula Faculty of Economics

Doctoral Schools:

1. Doctoral School of Law and Political Sciences;
2. Doctoral School of Multidisciplinary Engineering Sciences;
3. Doctoral School of Regional- and Economic Sciences; and
4. Wittmann Antal Multidisciplinary Doctoral School of Plant, Animal and Food Sciences.

== Developments ==
In May 2008, the new architectural studio was opened, through conversion of an old compressor house.

As of this date, SZE had won on the calling for tender to improve public facilities.

As of this date, the university has several projects underway, including the construction of a new building, the "Autopolis," that will expand the capacity of the university and will serve for research and development purposes; As part of the project, two multi-story car parks will be built, and a foot-bridge will be relocated, with an estimated date of completion in 2011.

== Student life ==
Student opportunities related to entertainment at SZE in Győr include the annual Széchenyi-week, where famous Hungarians— writers, comedians, etc.—are invited. In the week's Széchenyi race, alternative-operated vehicles challenge each other in races at the university.

In addition, the university offers opportunities to participate in sports (rowing, soccer, swimming, etc.).
