= Volkswagen Tayron =

Crossover SUV

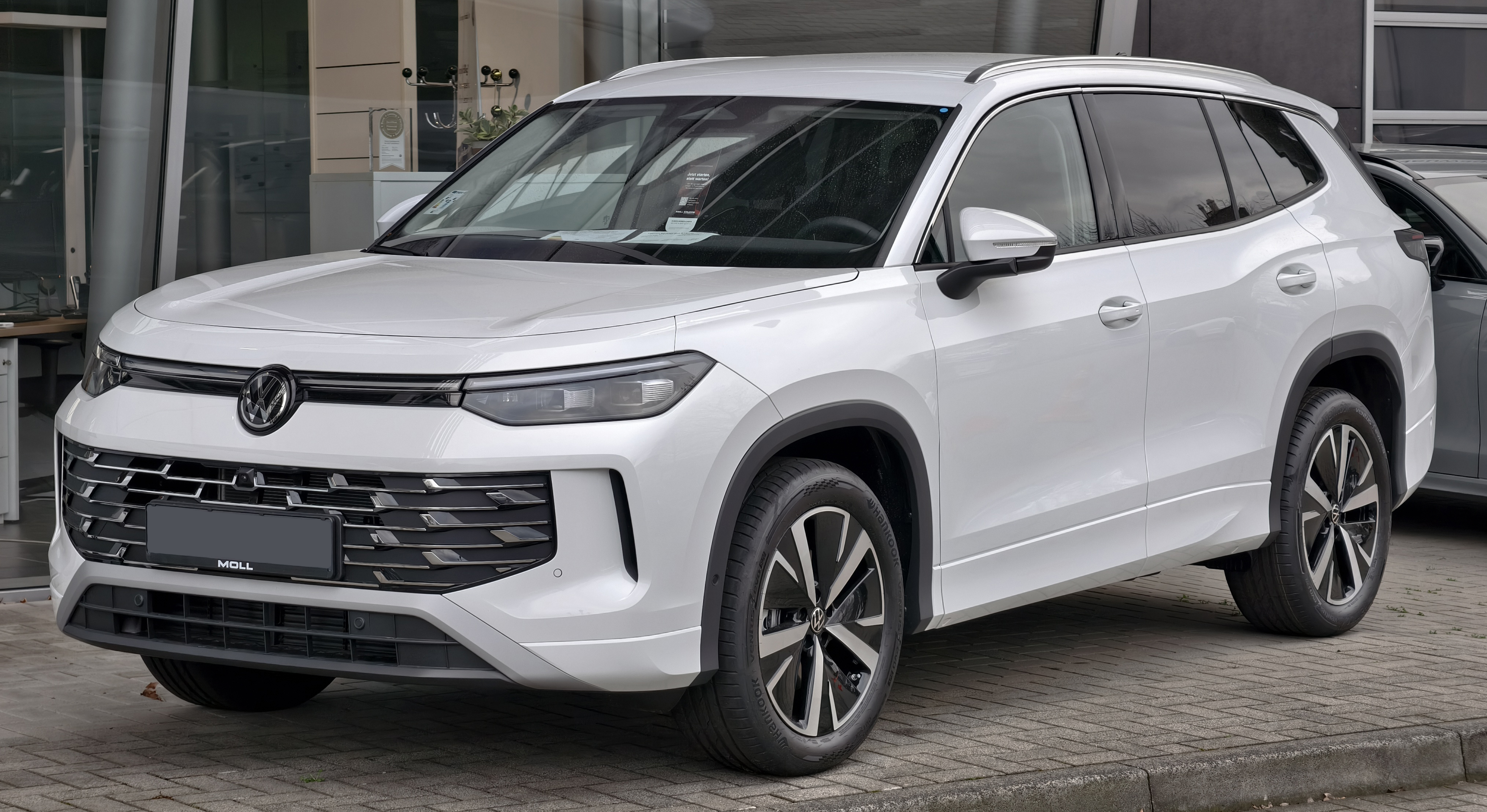
- 2025 Volkswagen Tayron eHybrid

Overview
- Manufacturer: Volkswagen
- Production: 2018–present

Body and chassis
- Class: Compact crossover SUV (2018–present); Mid-size crossover SUV (2024–present)
- Layout: Front engine, front wheel-drive Front-engine, all-wheel-drive
- Related: Volkswagen Tiguan

The Volkswagen Tayron is a crossover SUV produced by Volkswagen. Originally a Chinese market nameplate produced by FAW-Volkswagen since 2018, from the second-generation model the Tayron became a global nameplate starting in 2024 to replace the Tiguan Allspace, a long-wheelbase version of the Tiguan Mk2 that came with optional three-row seating.

According to Volkswagen, the name Tayron is a combination of the words 'tiger' and 'iron'.

== First generation (Typ 5N; 2018) ==
First generation
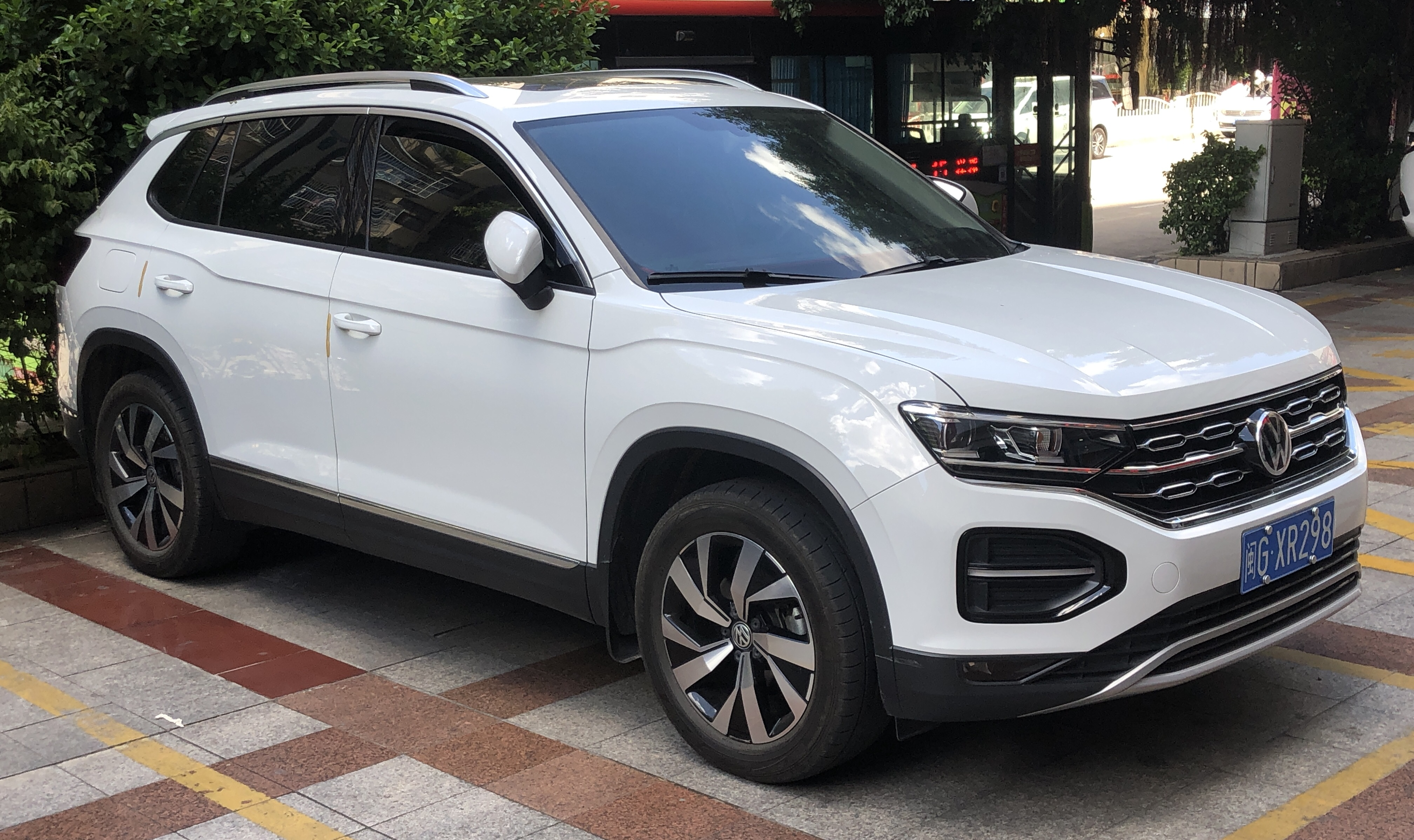
- Volkswagen Tayron (pre-facelift)

Overview
- Production: 2018–present
- Assembly: China: Tianjin (FAW-VW)

Body and chassis
- Class: Compact crossover SUV (C)
- Body style: 5-door SUV; 5-door coupé SUV (Tayron X)
- Platform: Volkswagen Group MQB A2
- Related: Volkswagen Tiguan Mk2

Powertrain
- Engine: Petrol: 1.4 L EA211 I4; 2.0 L EA888 I4
- Power output: 110 kW (148 hp; 150 PS) (280 TSI); 137 kW (183 hp; 186 PS) (330 TSI); 162 kW (217 hp; 220 PS) (380 TSI)
- Transmission: 7-speed DSG

Dimensions
- Wheelbase: 2,731 mm (107.5 in)
- Length: 4,589–4,595 mm (180.7–180.9 in); 4,640 mm (182.7 in) (Tayron X)
- Width: 1,860 mm (73.2 in)
- Height: 1,660 mm (65.4 in)

The first-generation Tayron was presented as a near production concept named VW Advanced Midsize SUV during the premiere of the Volkswagen Touareg III in March 2018. At the Chengdu Motor Show in September 2018, Volkswagen finally presented the production vehicle. Since October 2018, it is available in China.

Built by FAW-Volkswagen, the model is powered by 1.4-litre and 2.0-litre turbocharged engine options, paired to a 7-speed dual clutch gearbox. 280TSI, 330TSI and 380TSI trims are available. Other models include the Tayron R-Line and Tayron GTE Plug-In Hybrid.

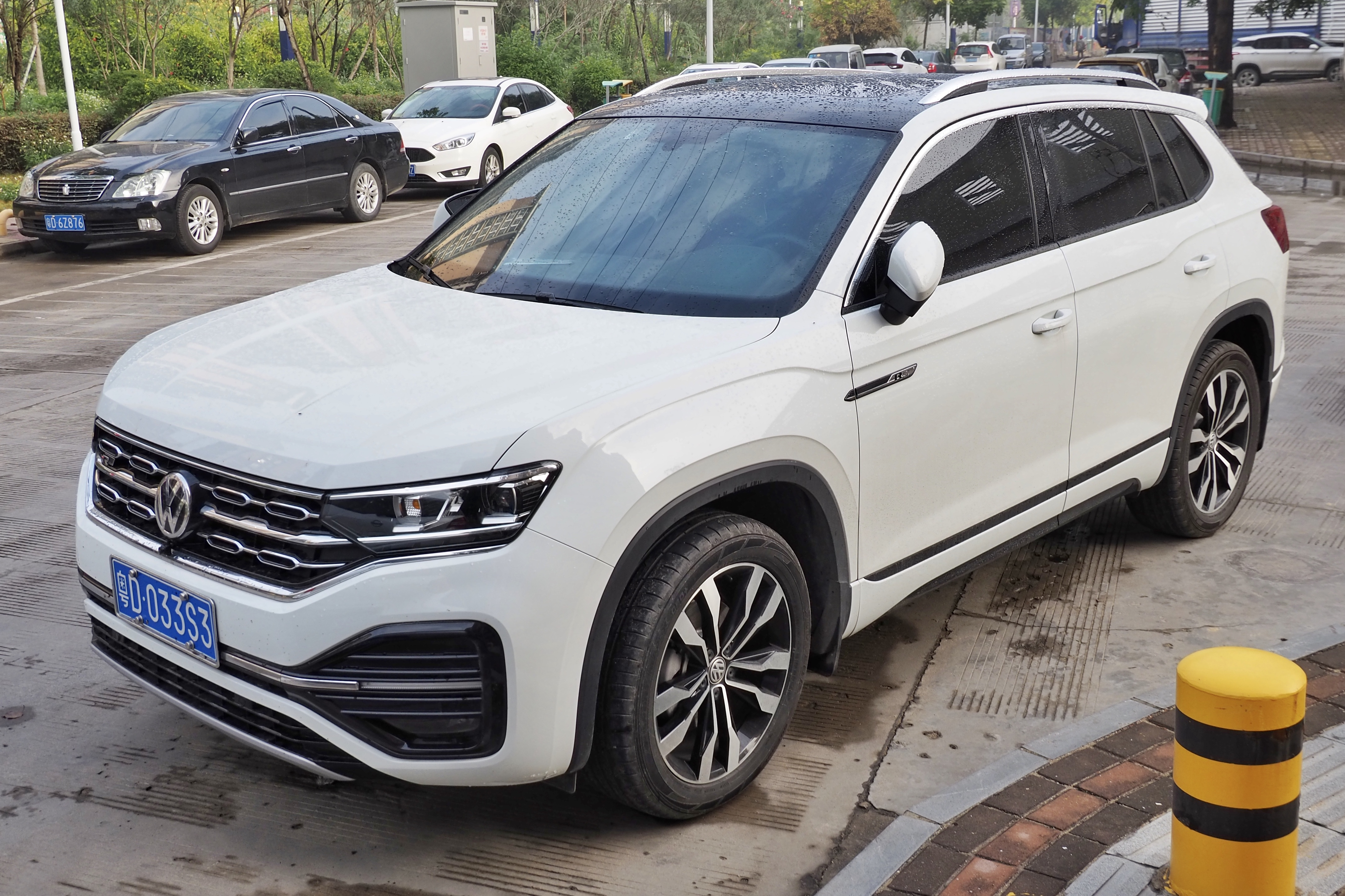
Volkswagen Tayron 380 TSI

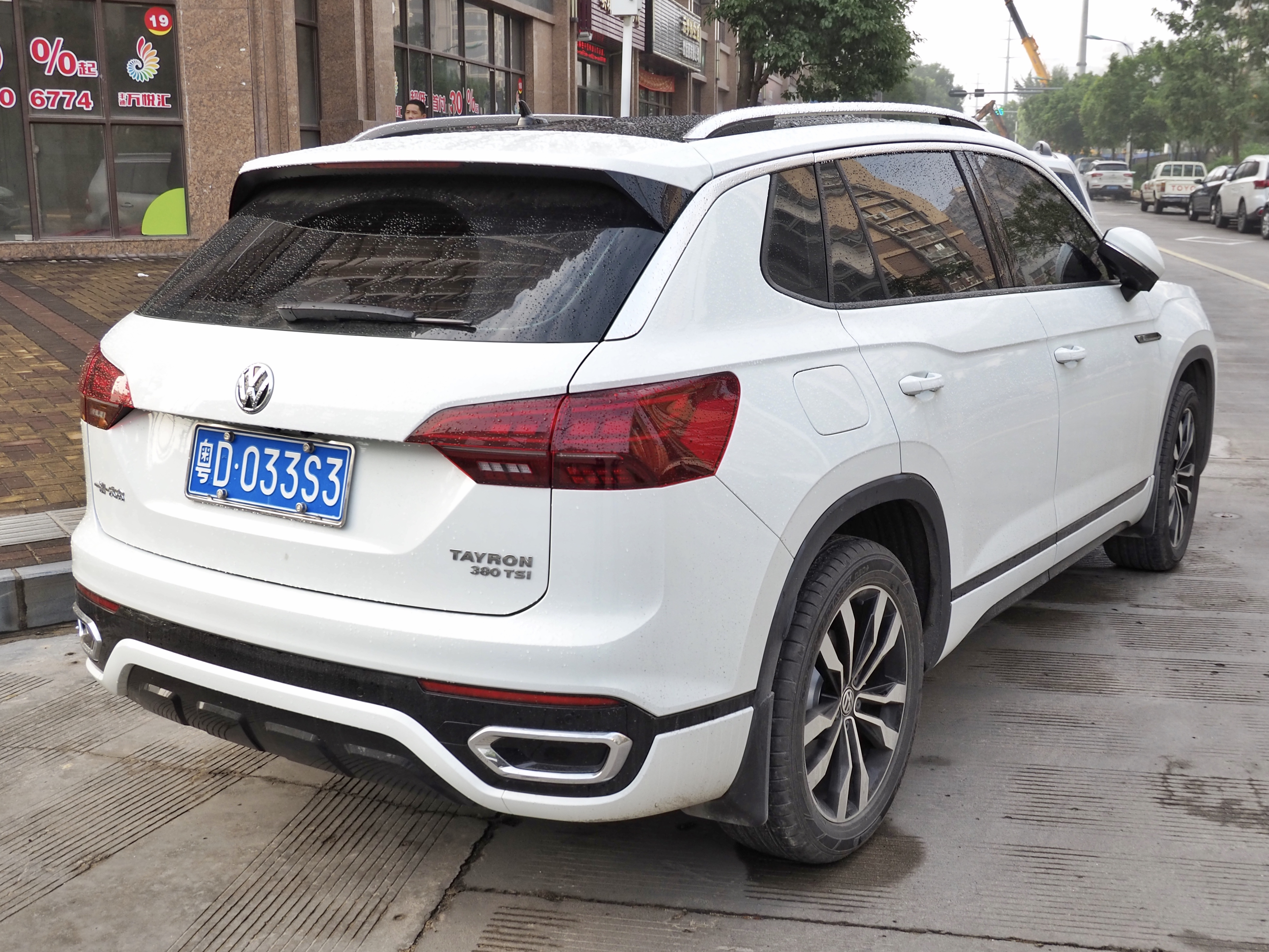
Rear view

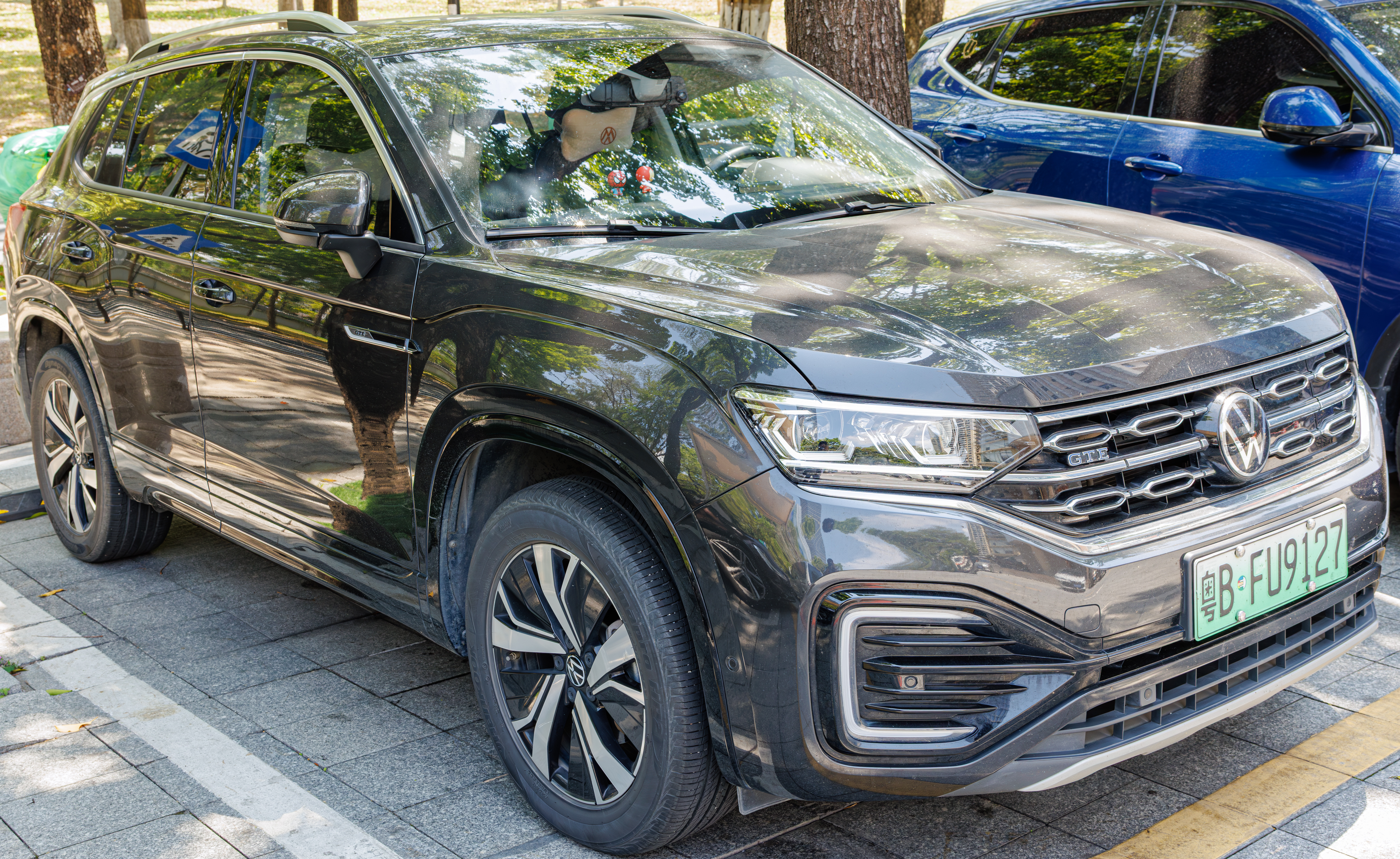
Volkswagen Tayron GTE

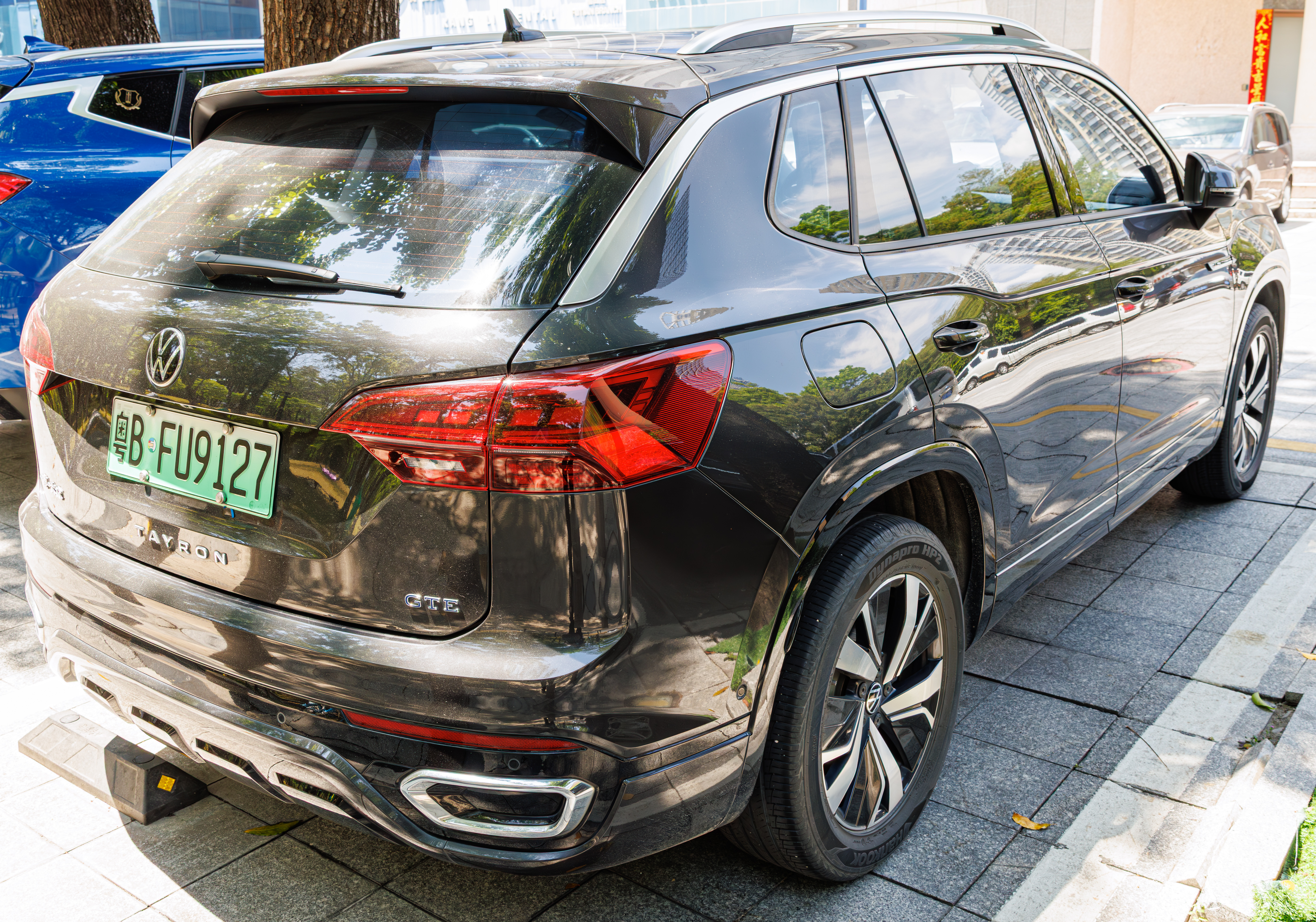
Rear

=== Tayron X ===
A variant with a coupé CUV body style called the "Tayron X" was announced in April 2020. It resembles the Volkswagen SUV Coupé Concept that was shown at the 2019 edition of Auto Shanghai. Besides having a different shape, it is slightly longer at 4,640 mm (182.7 in).

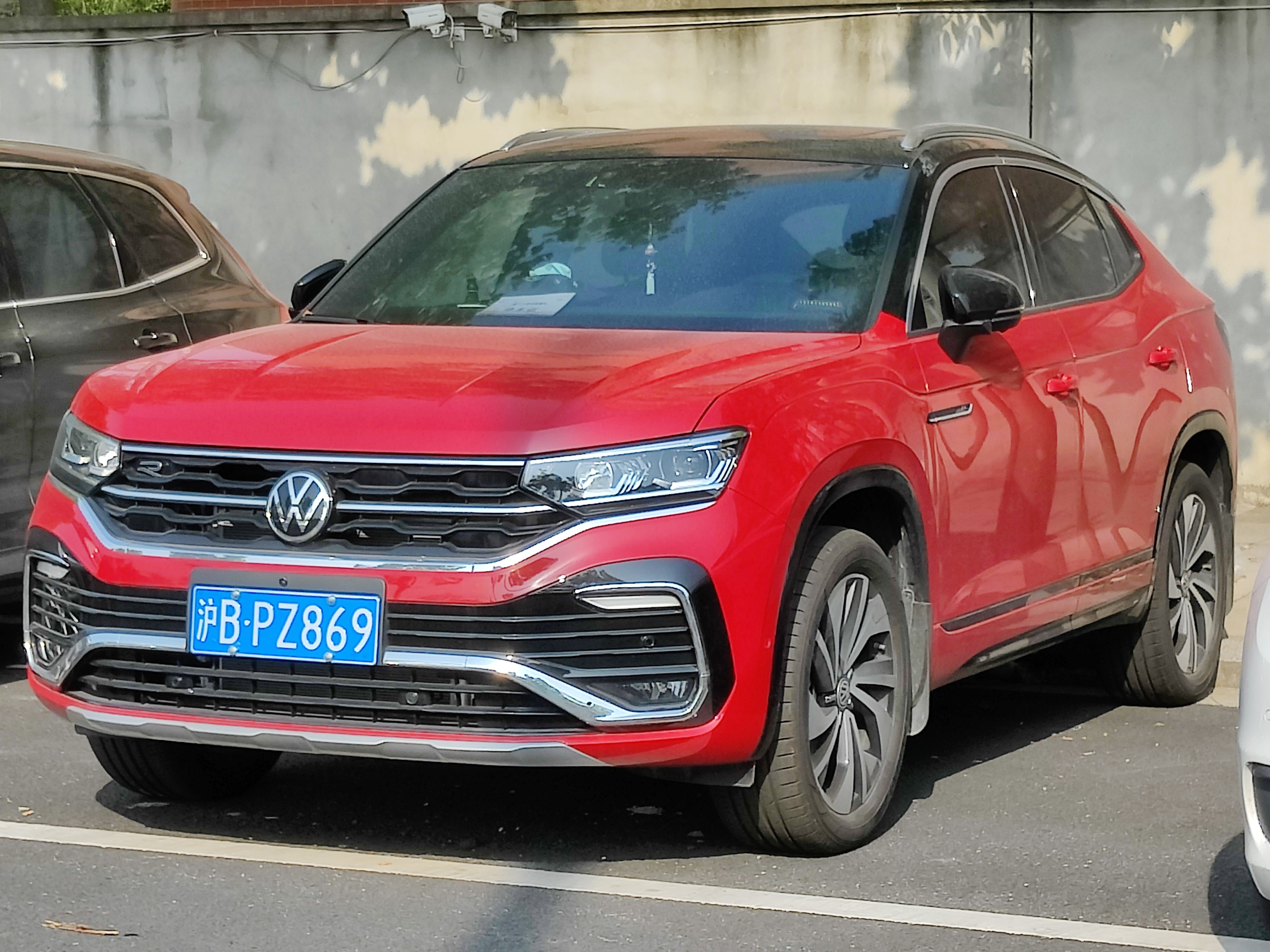
Volkswagen Tayron X

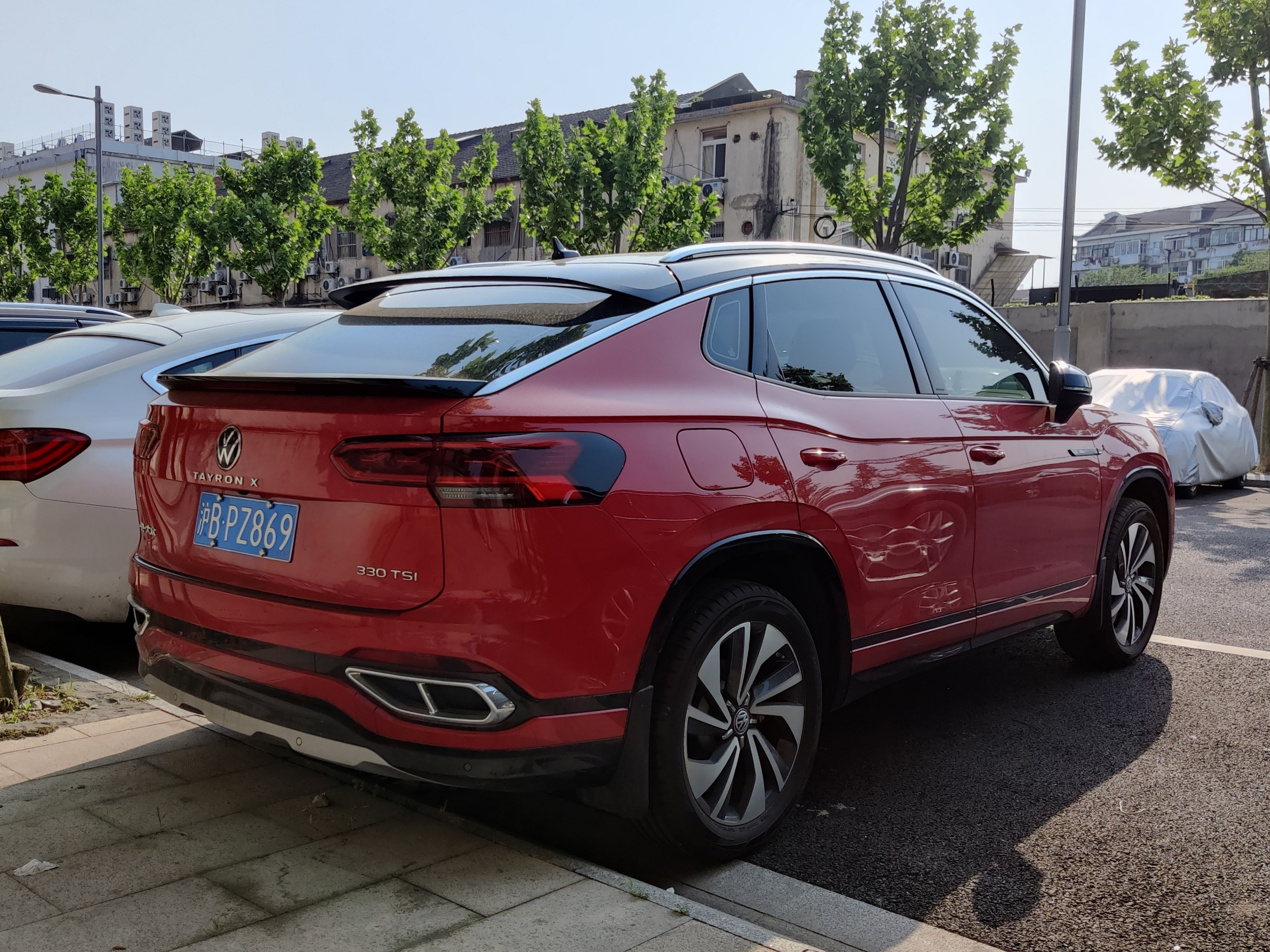
Rear

=== 2023 facelift ===
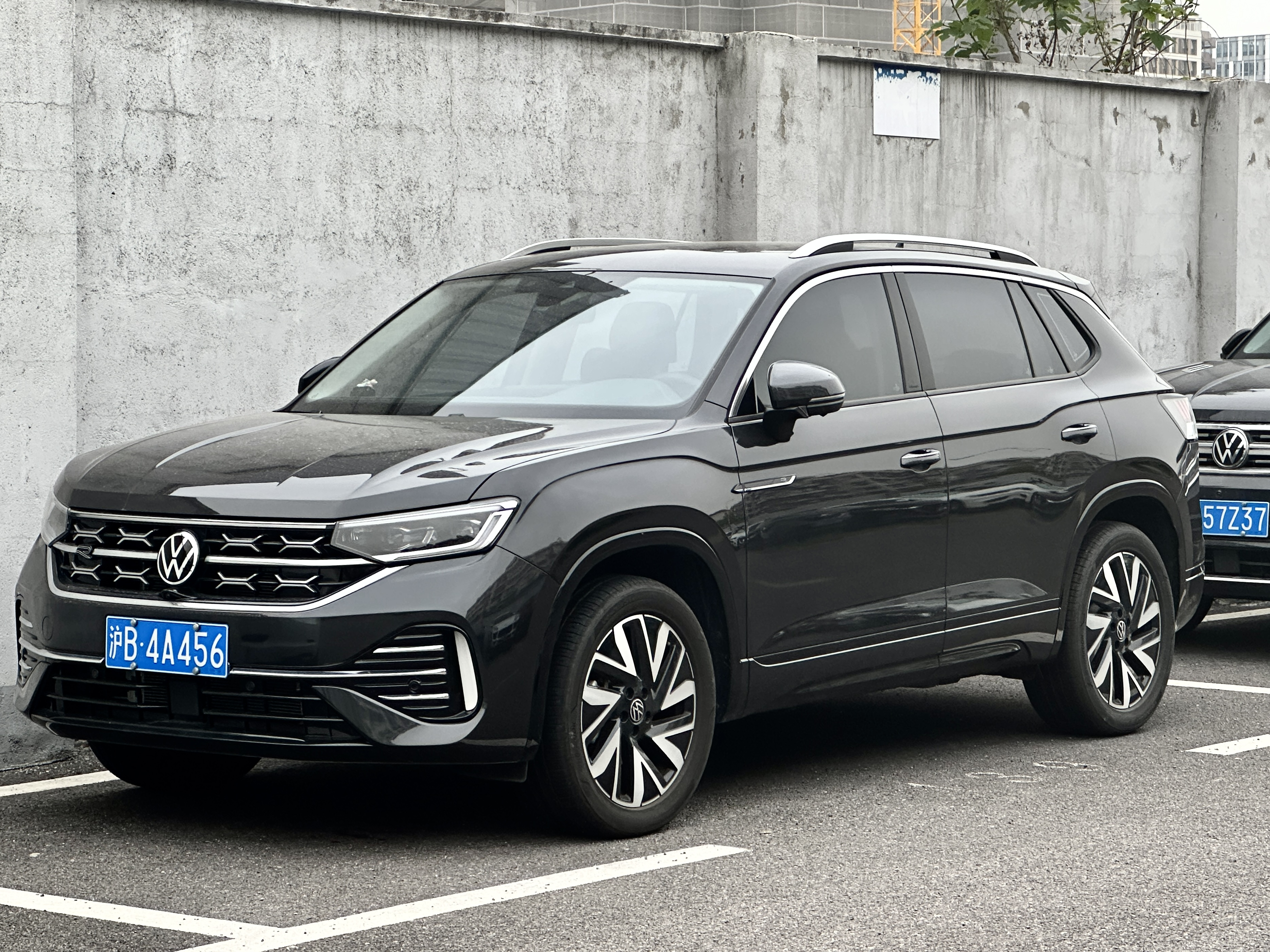
Volkswagen Tayron facelift

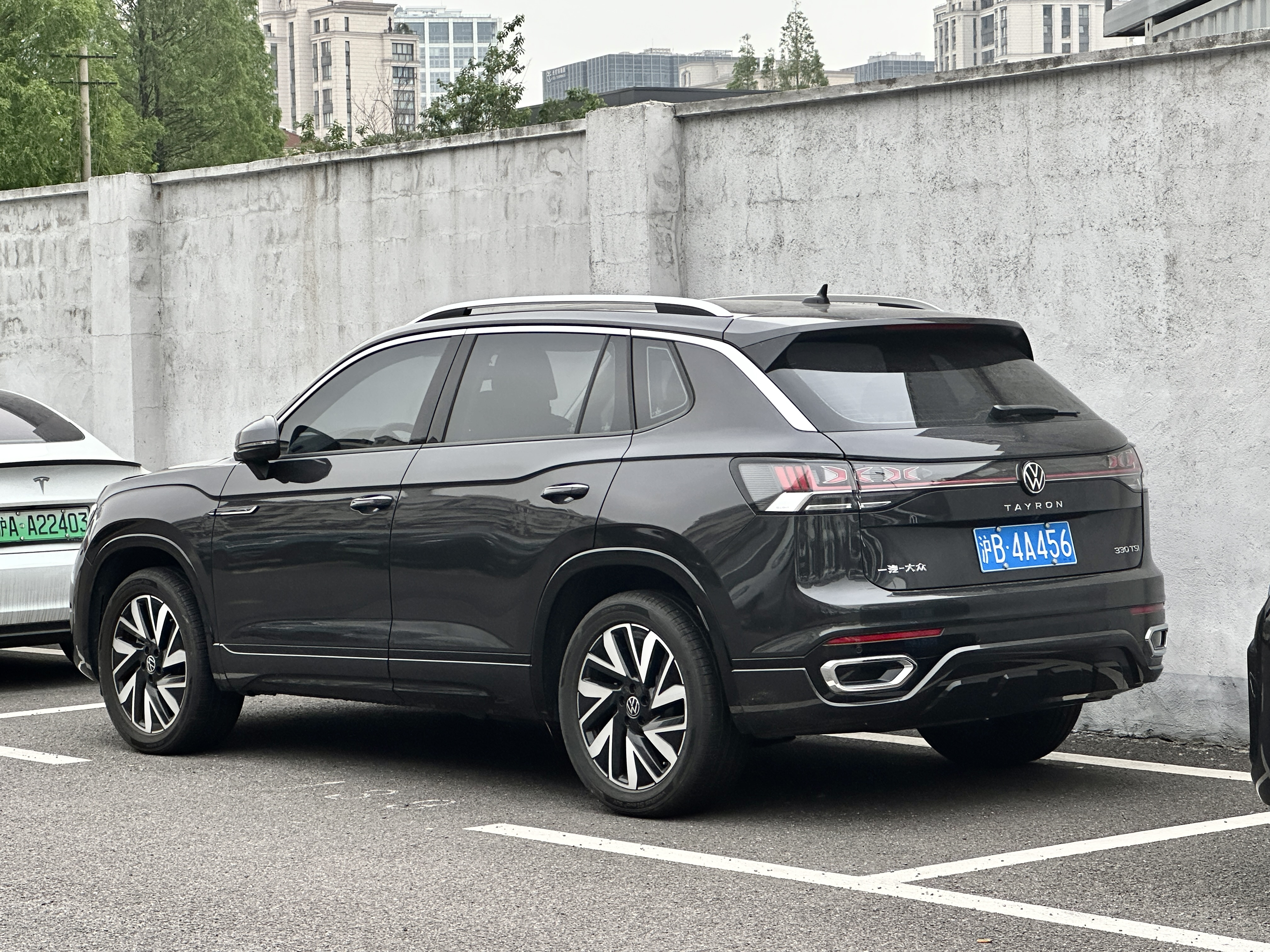
Rear

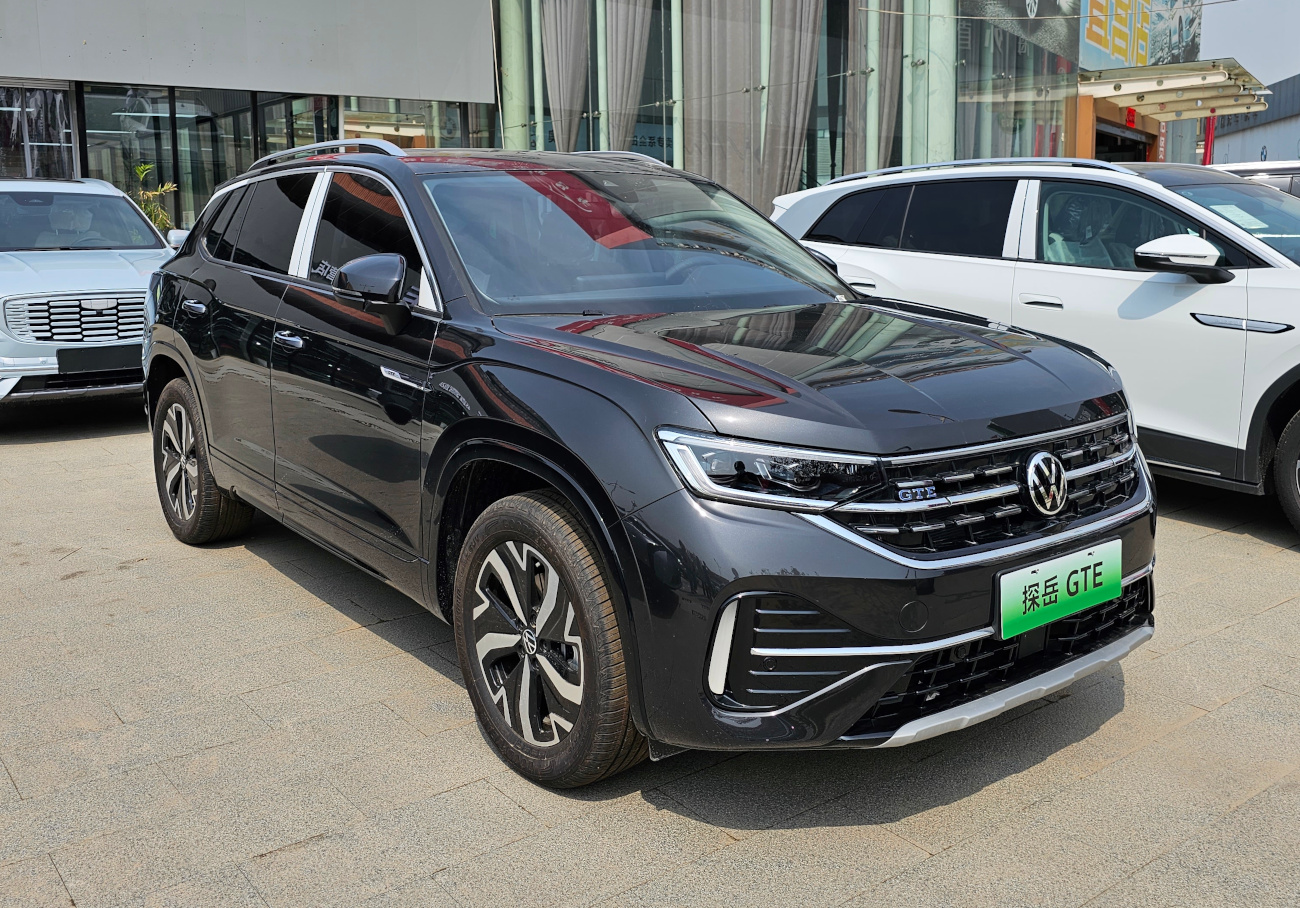
Volkswagen Tayron GTE facelift

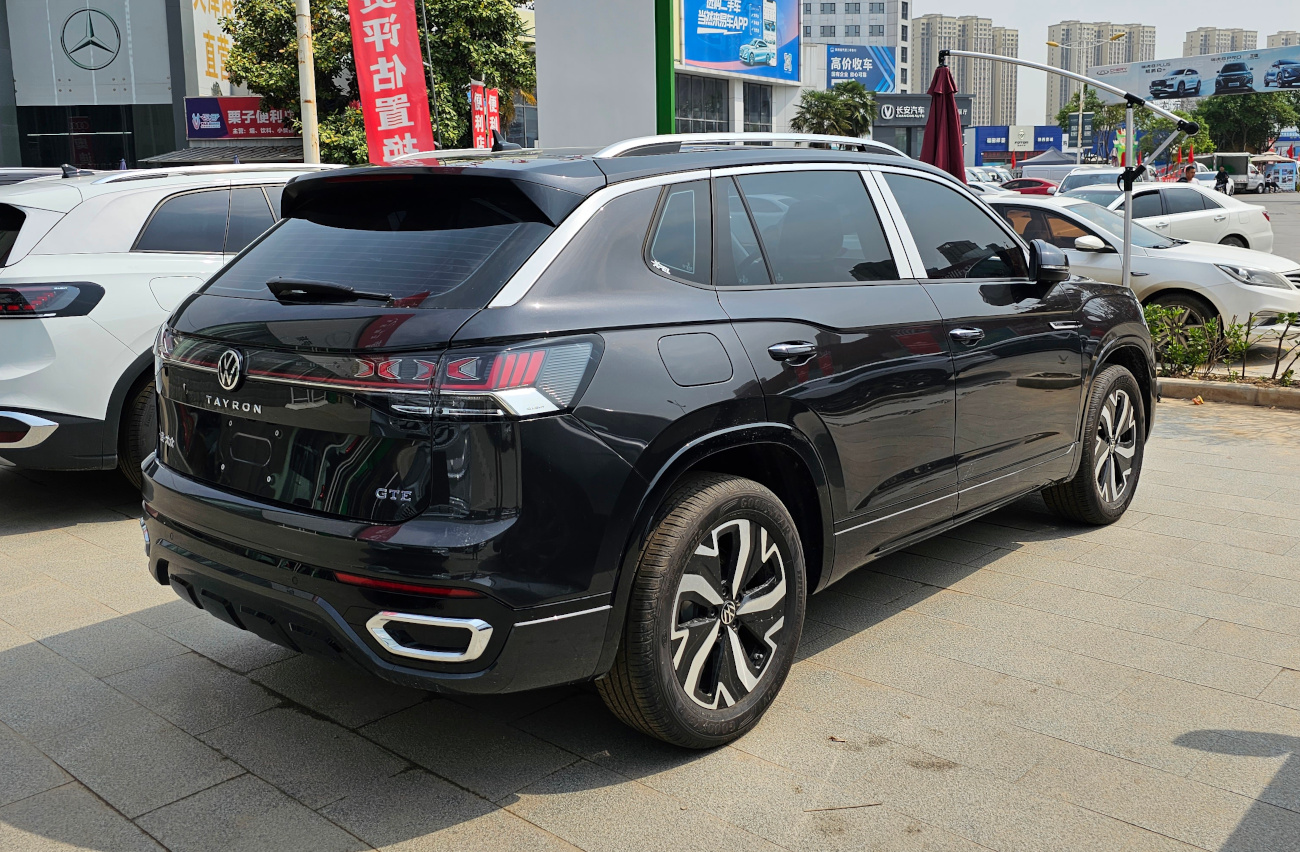
Rear

=== Powertrain ===
Petrol engines
Model	Displacement	Series	Power	Torque	Transmission
1.4 '280 TSI'	1,395 cc I4	EA211	150 PS (110 kW; 148 hp)	250 N⋅m (184 lb⋅ft)	7-speed DSG
2.0 '330 TSI'	1,984 cc I4	EA888 (DPL)	186 PS (183 hp; 137 kW)	320 N⋅m (236 lb⋅ft)	7-speed DSG
2.0 '380 TSI'	1,984 cc I4	EA888 (DKX)	220 PS (217 hp; 162 kW)	350 N⋅m (258 lb⋅ft)	7-speed DSG

== Second generation (Typ DN; 2024) ==
Second generation
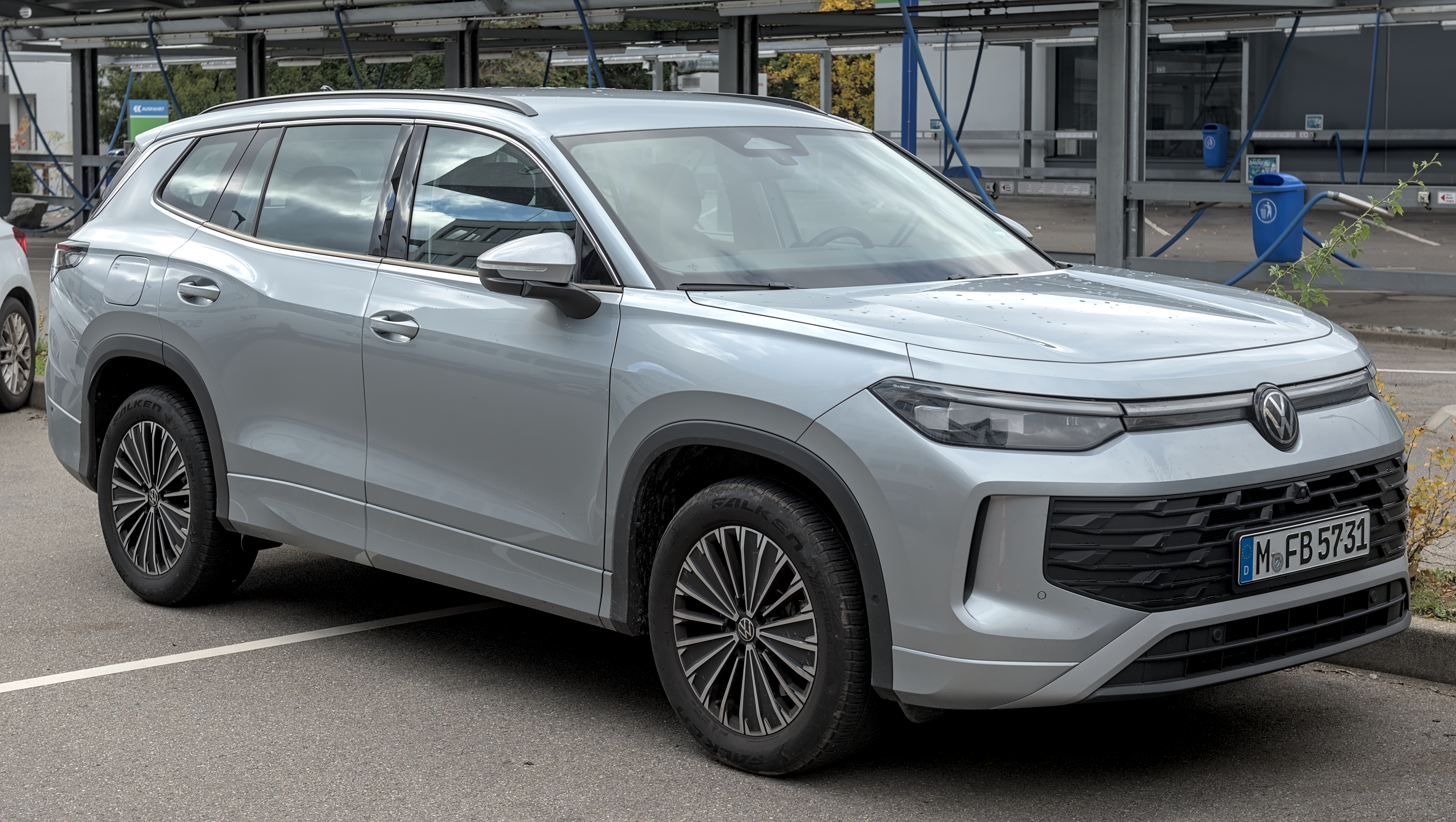

Overview
- Also called: Volkswagen Tiguan (North America and Brazil)
- Production: November 2024 – present
- Assembly: Germany: Wolfsburg (Wolfsburg Volkswagen Plant); Mexico: Puebla (VW Mexico); China: Changchun, Jilin (FAW-VW); India: Aurangabad (Škoda Auto Volkswagen India); Malaysia: Pekan (HICOM)

Body and chassis
- Class: Mid-size crossover SUV (D) (European Union); Compact crossover SUV (C) (China and North America)
- Body style: 5-door SUV
- Platform: Volkswagen Group MQB Evo
- Related: Volkswagen Tiguan Mk3; Škoda Kodiaq Mk2; Audi Q3 F3; Cupra Terramar; Jetta VS8

Powertrain
- Engine: Petrol: 1.5 L TSI I4; 1.5 L eTSI I4 mild hybrid; 2.0 L TSI I4; Petrol plug-in hybrid: 1.5 L eTSI I4; Diesel: 2.0 L TDI I4
- Transmission: 7-speed DSG

Dimensions
- Wheelbase: 2,791 mm (109.9 in)
- Length: 4,792 mm (188.7 in) (European Union); 4,684–4,695 mm (184.4–184.8 in) (China)
- Width: 1,854–1,866 mm (73.0–73.5 in)
- Height: 1,666 mm (65.6 in) (Europe); 1,685 mm (66.3 in)

Chronology
- Predecessor: Volkswagen Tiguan Allspace

The second-generation Tayron was presented at the 2024 Paris Motor Show in October. It is an Mid-size crossover SUV (D) with optional three-row seating, positioned between the Tiguan and Touareg and replacing the Tiguan Allspace the long-wheelbase and three-row version of the Tiguan Mk2. It is the first Tayron to be marketed outside China. As of 2026, the production of the Tayron Mk2 is performed at five locations: Wolfsburg in Germany; Puebla in Mexico; Changchun in China; in Chhatrapati Sambhajinagar, India; and Pekan in Malaysia via complete knock-down kits.

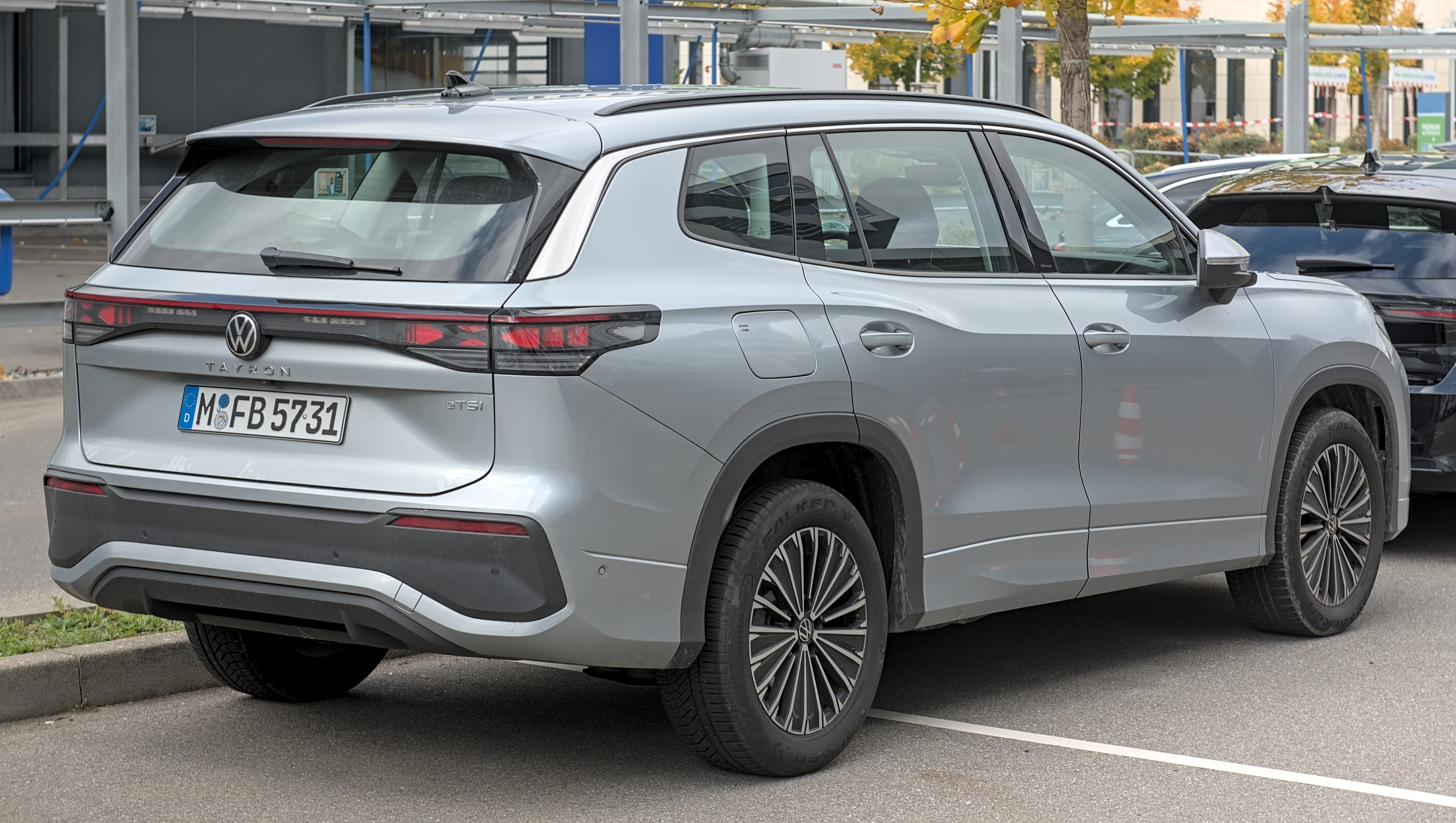
Rear view

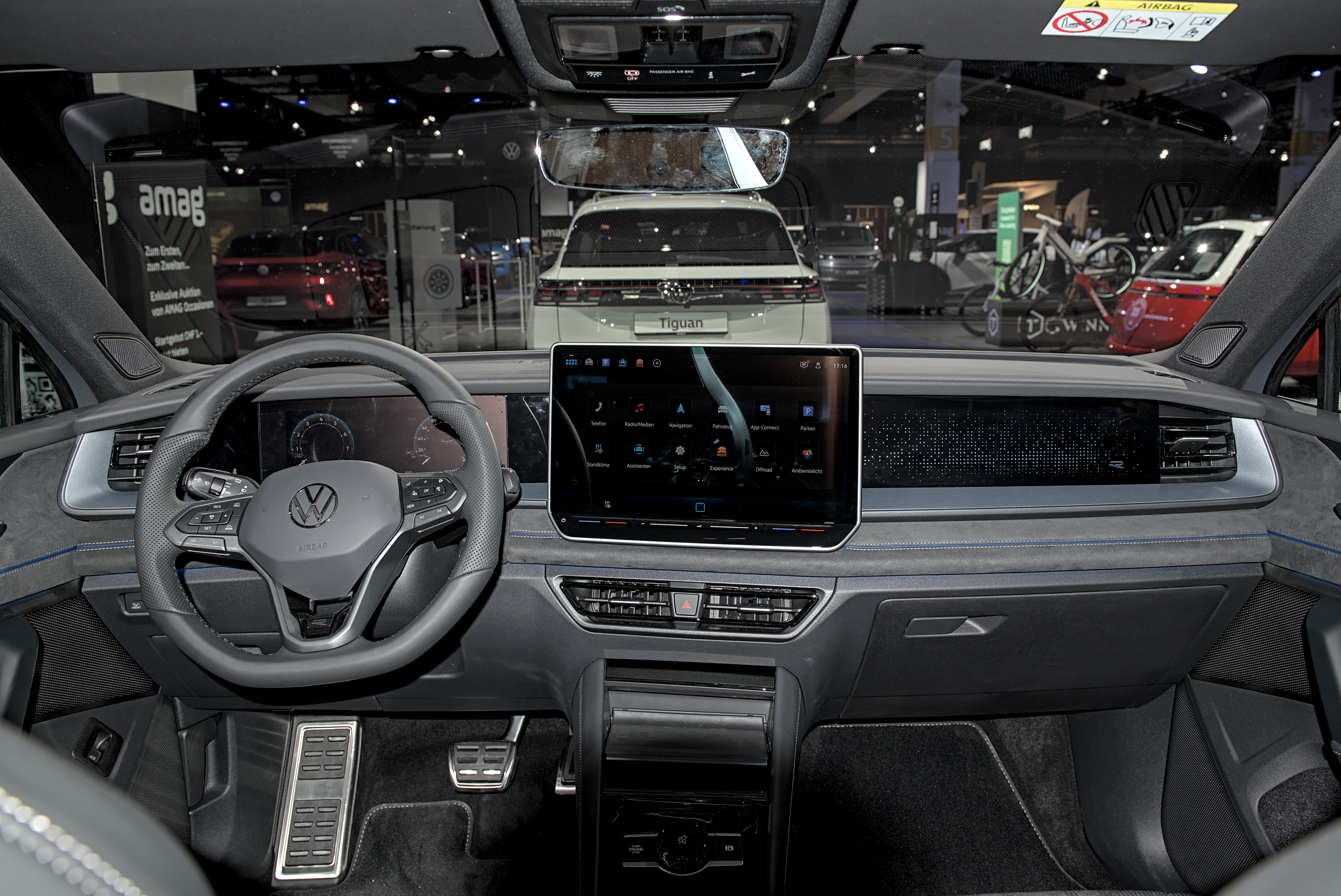
Interior

=== Markets ===
==== China ====
In China, the second-generation Tayron is marketed as the Tayron L to signify its longer dimensions (4,684mm-4,695mm), and to distinguish it with the first-generation model. Classified as a Compact crossover SUV (C).

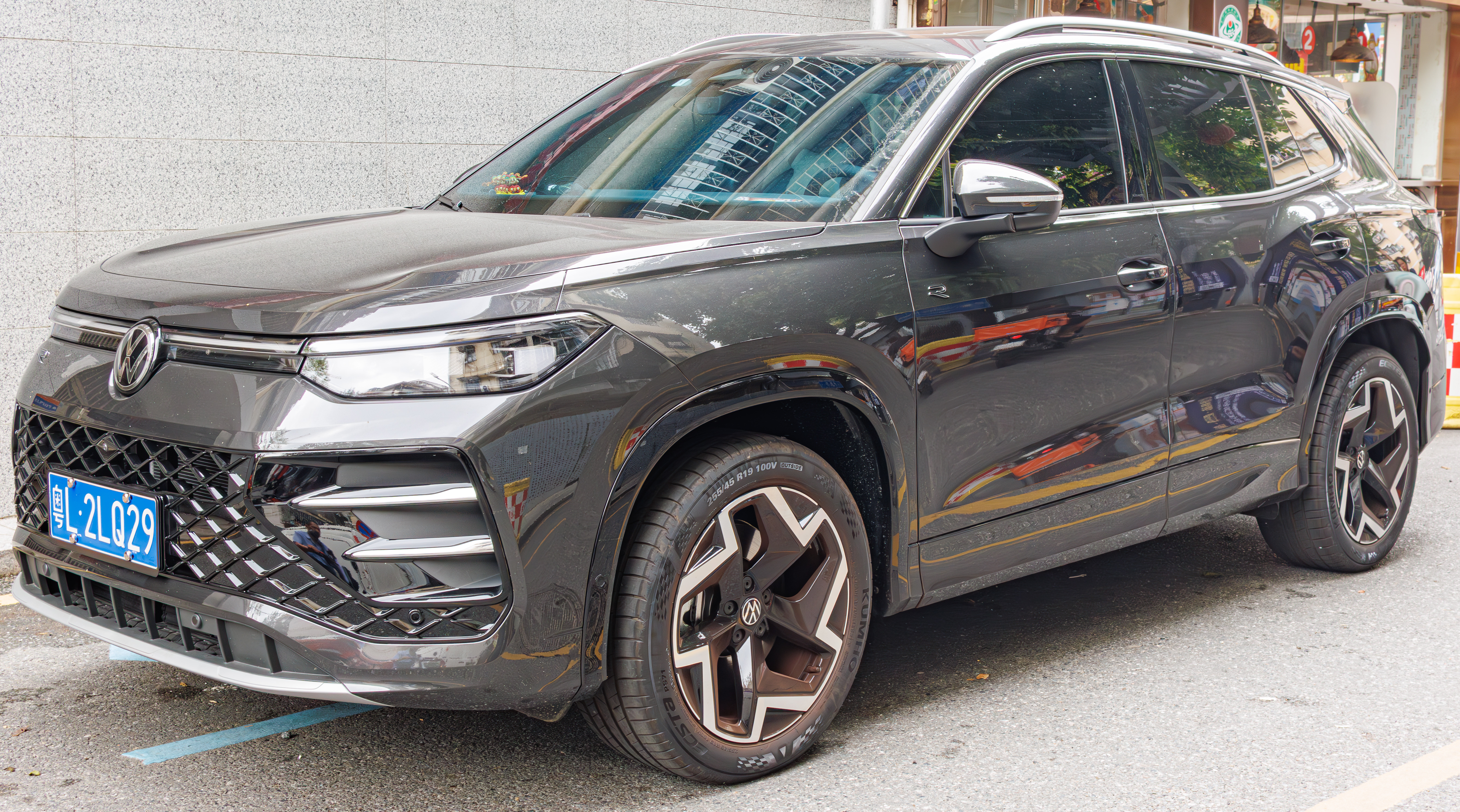
Volkswagen Tayron L R-line (China)

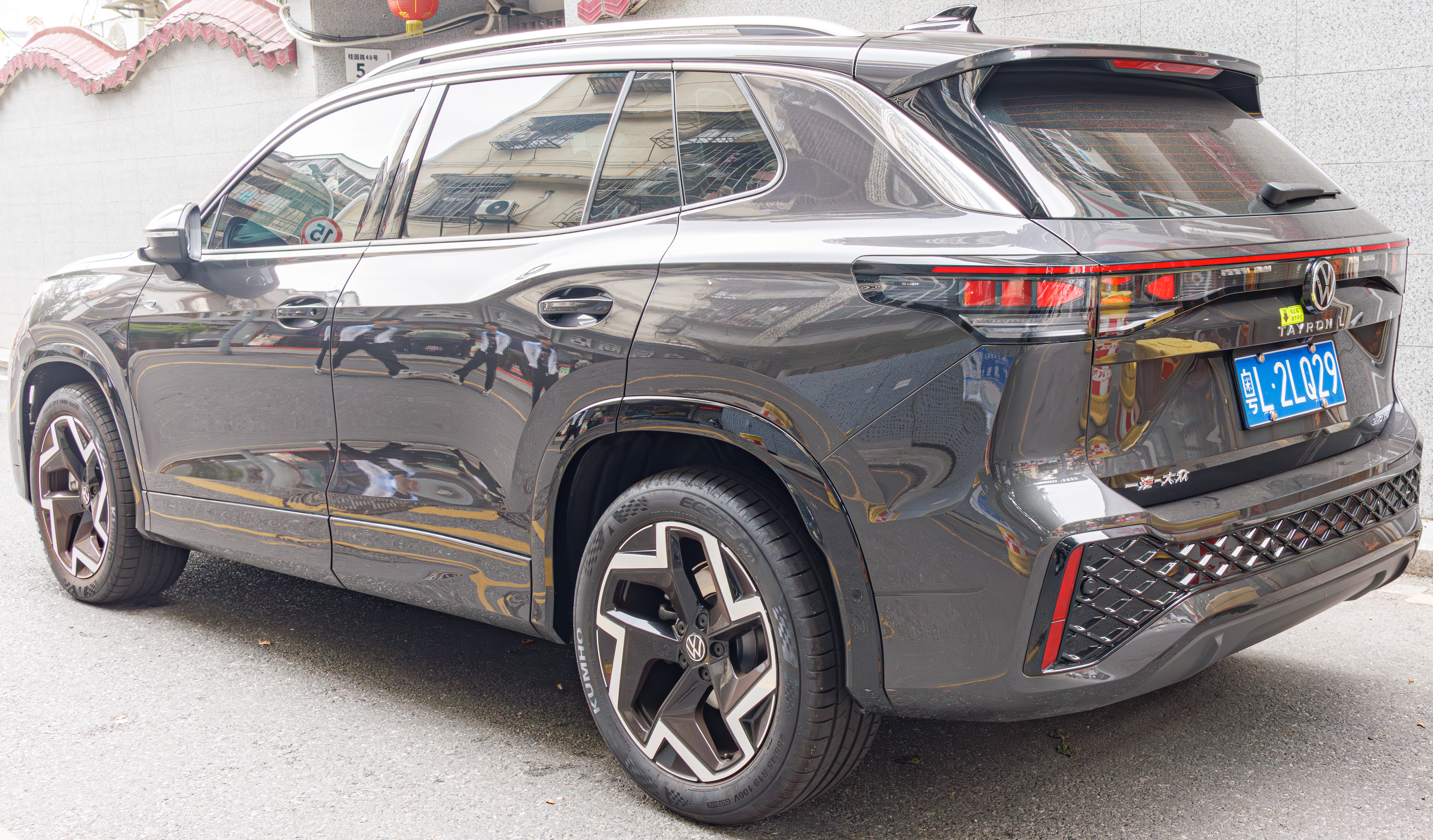
Rear view (Tayron L R-line)

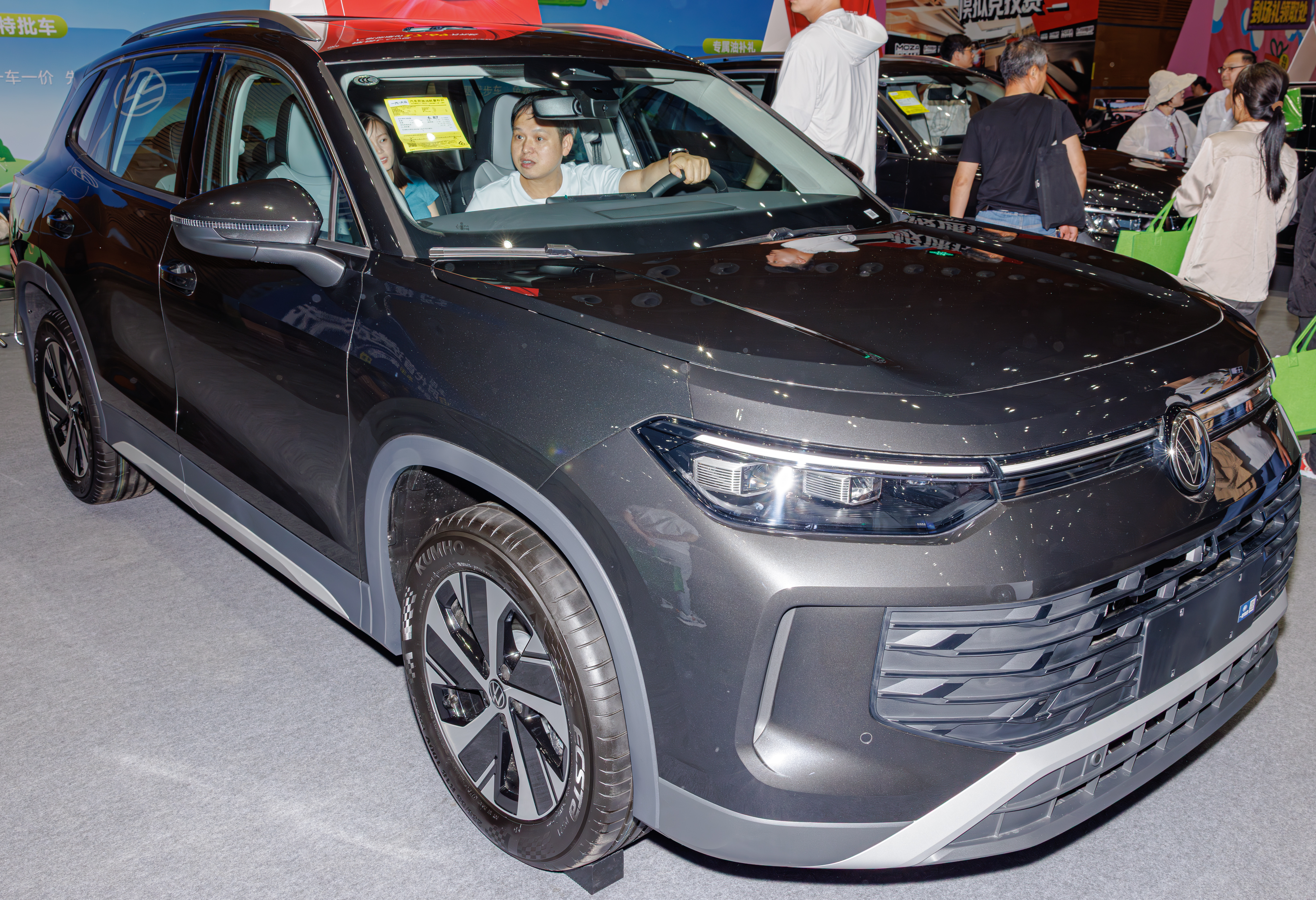
Volkswagen Tayron L (China)

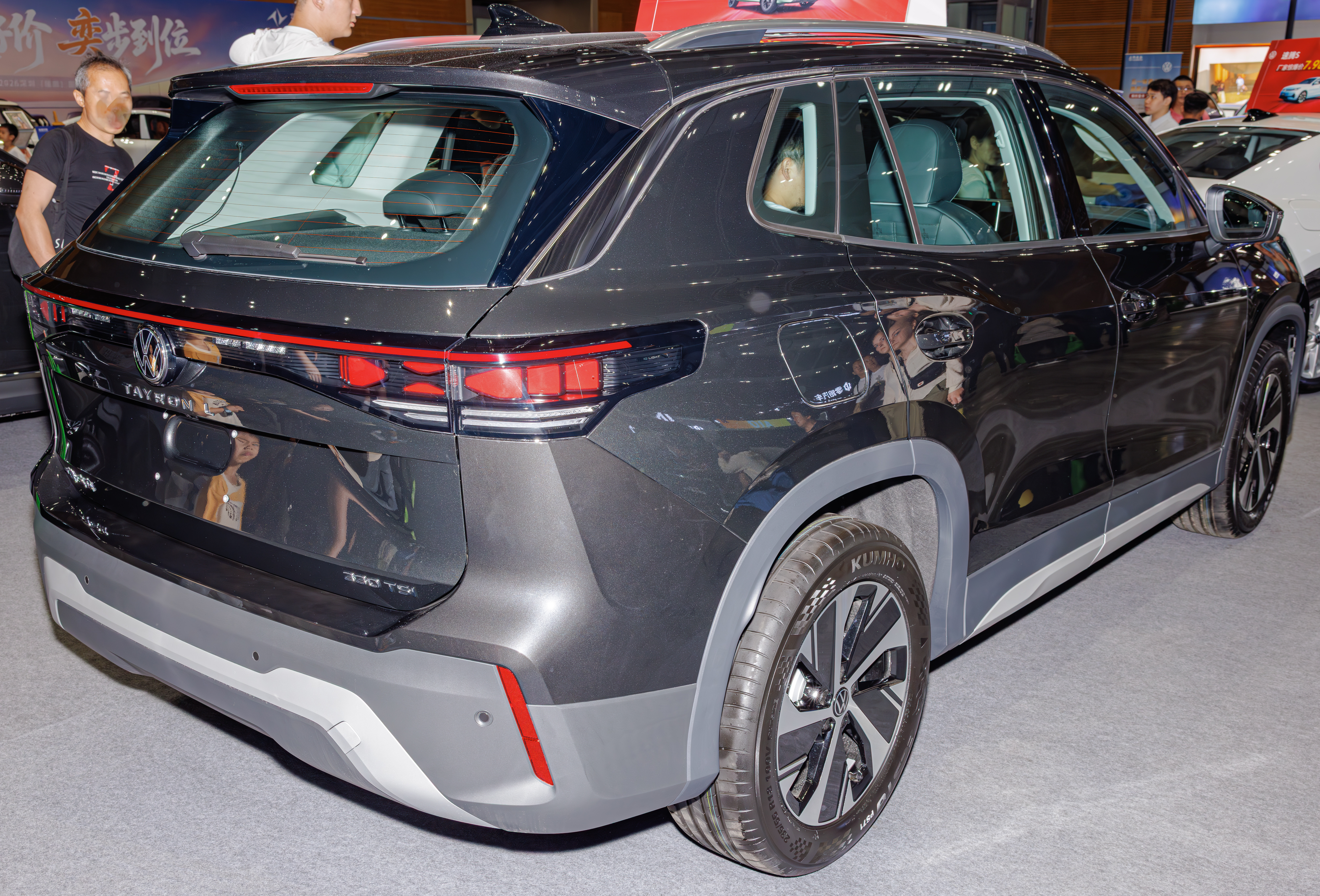
Rear view (Tayron L)

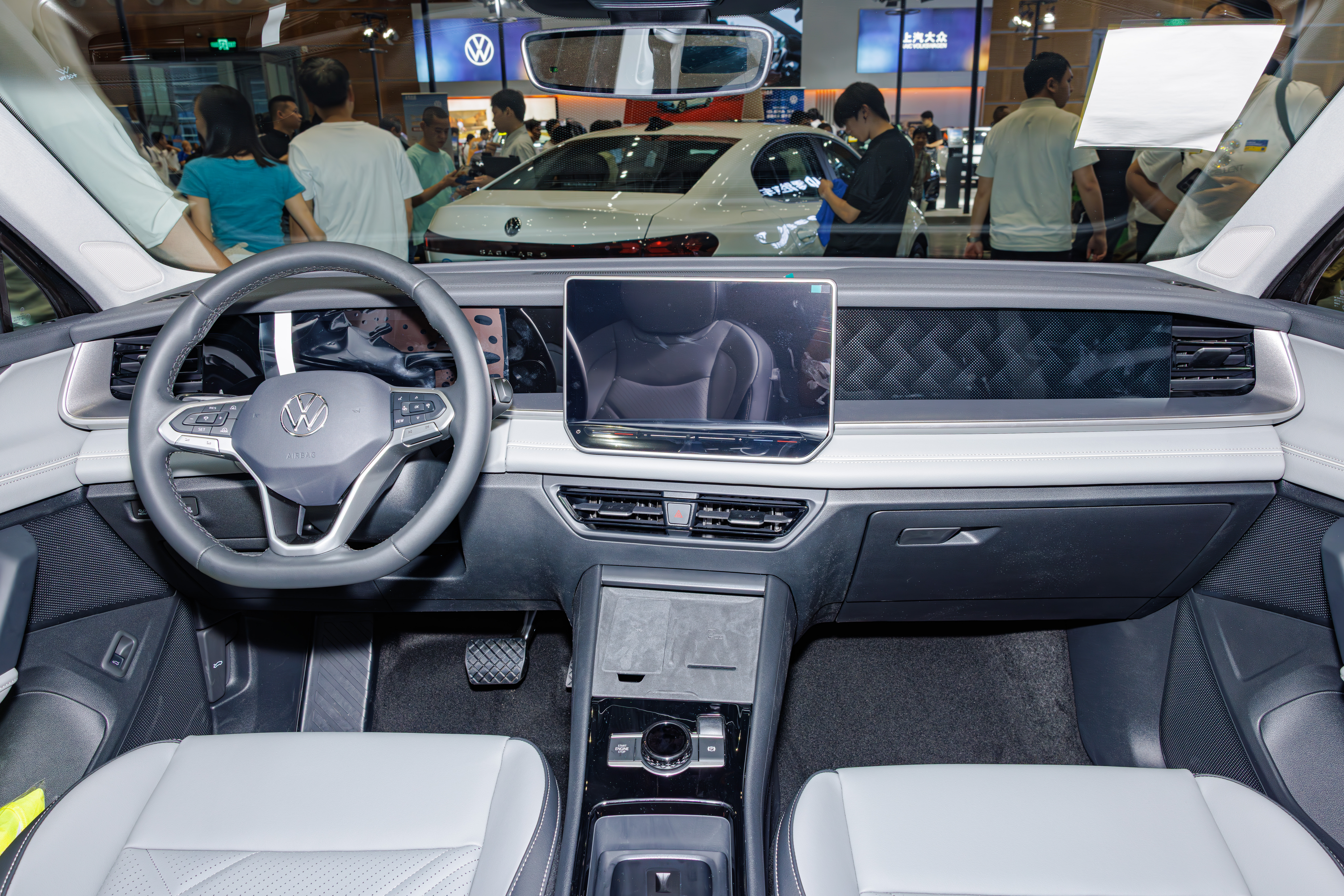
Interior (Tayron L)

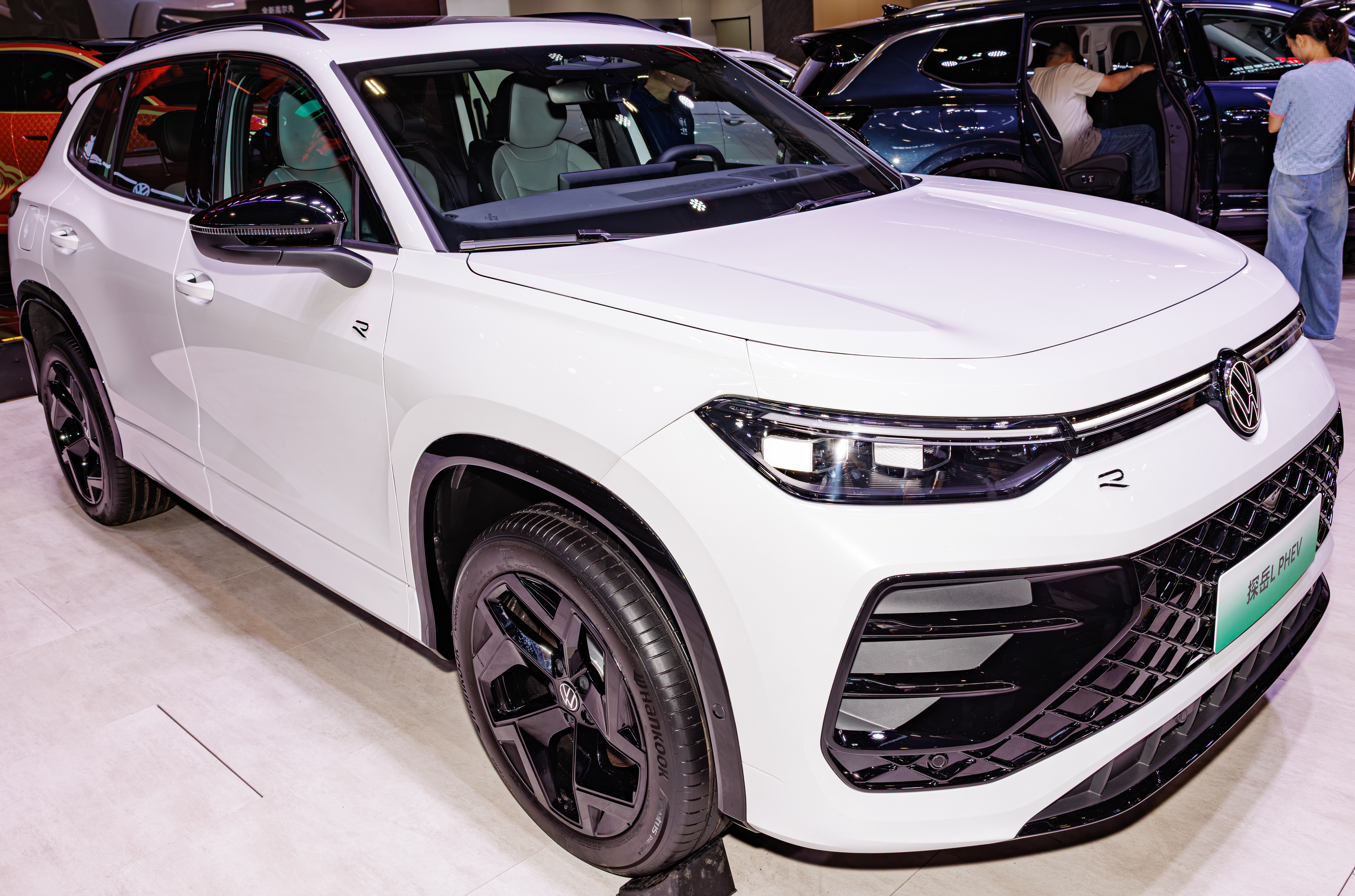
Volkswagen Tayron L PHEV (China)

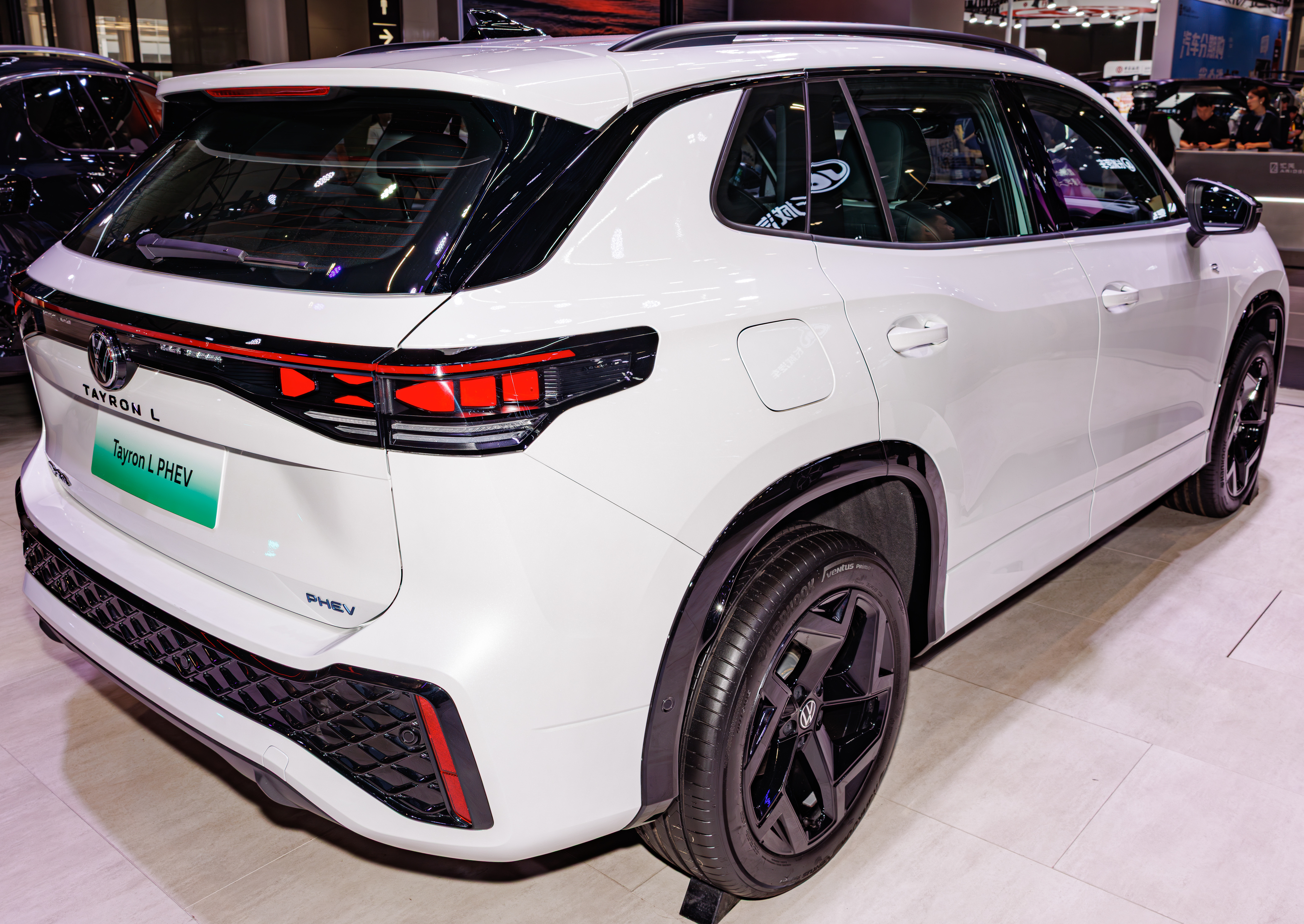
Rear view (Tayron L PHEV)

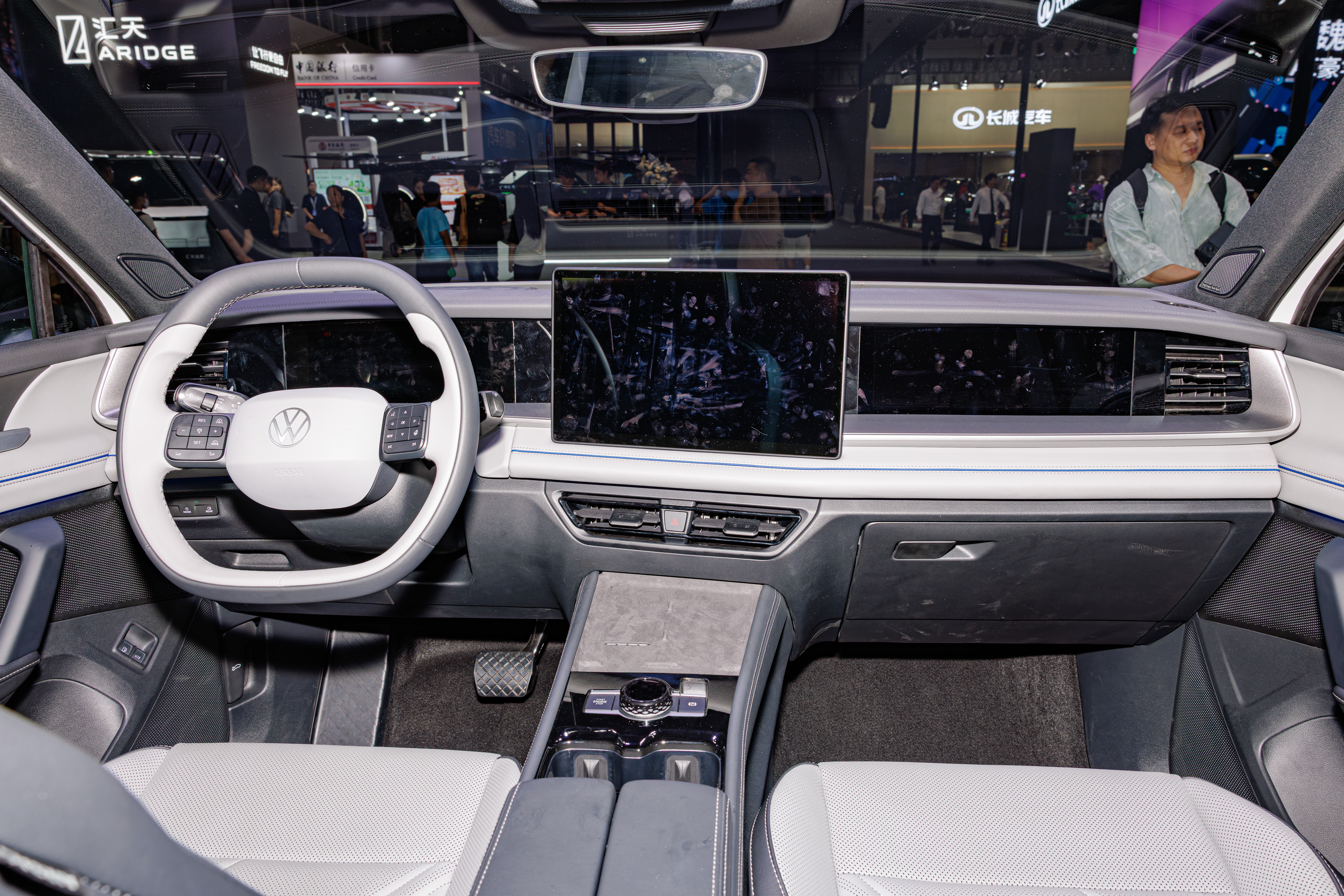
Interior (Tayron L PHEV)

==== North America (Tiguan) ====
In North America, the third-generation Tiguan, introduced for the 2025 model year, is closely related to the Chinese-market Tayron L and shares its long-wheelbase configuration, unlike the shorter European-market Tiguan Mk3.Ramsey, Jonathon (12 August 2024). "China's 2025 Tayron L hits the web, foreshadowing our 2025 Tiguan". Autoblog. Although the North American model is marketed under the Tiguan nameplate, it has market-specific bodywork, powertrains and equipment. The model was unveiled on the eve of the press days for the 2024 Los Angeles Auto Show."Volkswagen showcases its freshest lineup yet at the Los Angeles Auto Show". Volkswagen US Media (Press release). Unlike its predecessor, which was offered in North America with both two-row and three-row seating configurations, the third-generation North American Tiguan is available exclusively with two rows. It is 170 pounds (77 kg) lighter than the previous-generation long-wheelbase model.McAleer, Brendan. "2025 Volkswagen Tiguan Drops the Third Row and Adds Power". Car and Driver.

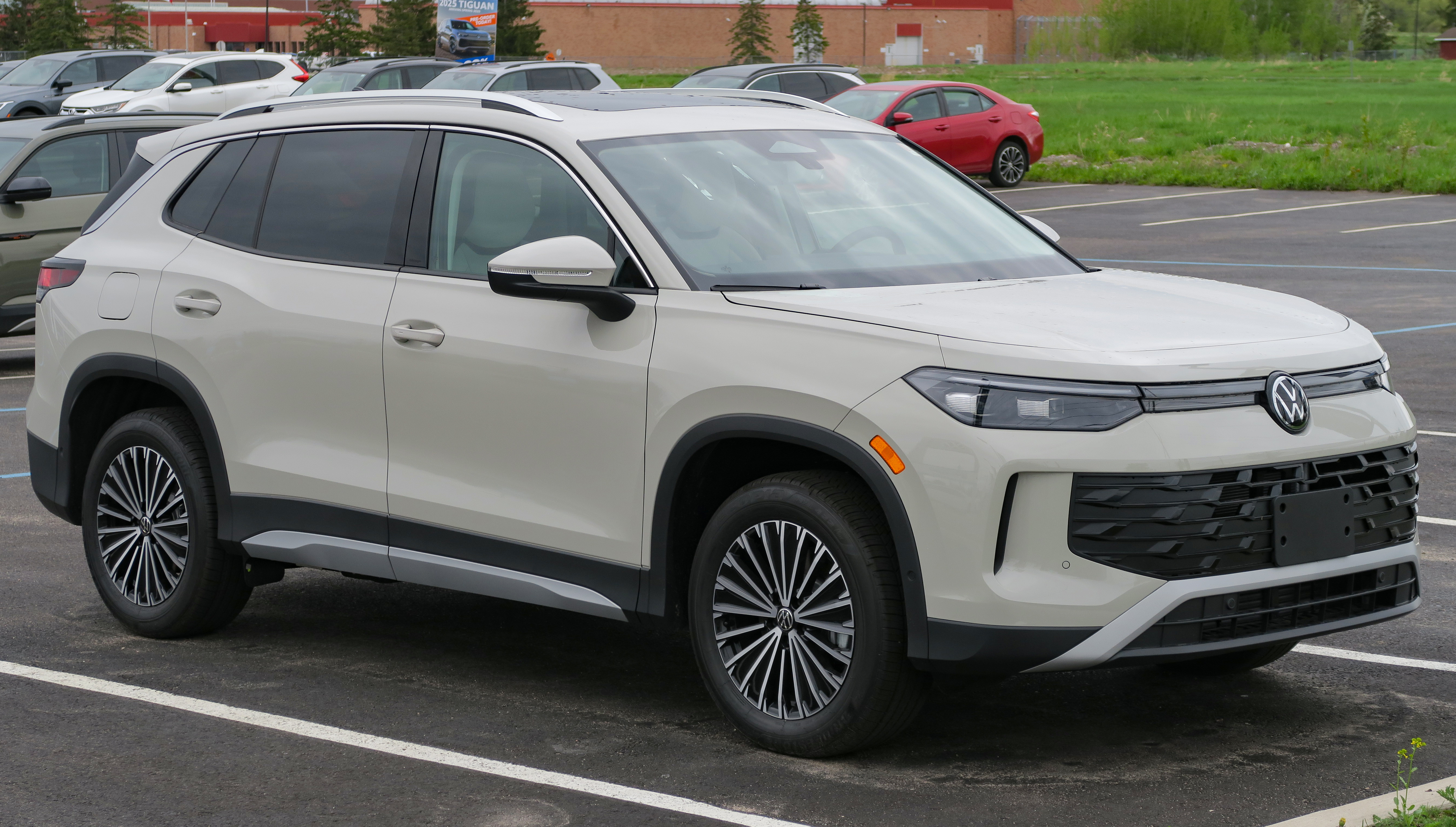
2025 Volkswagen Tiguan Comfortline (North America)

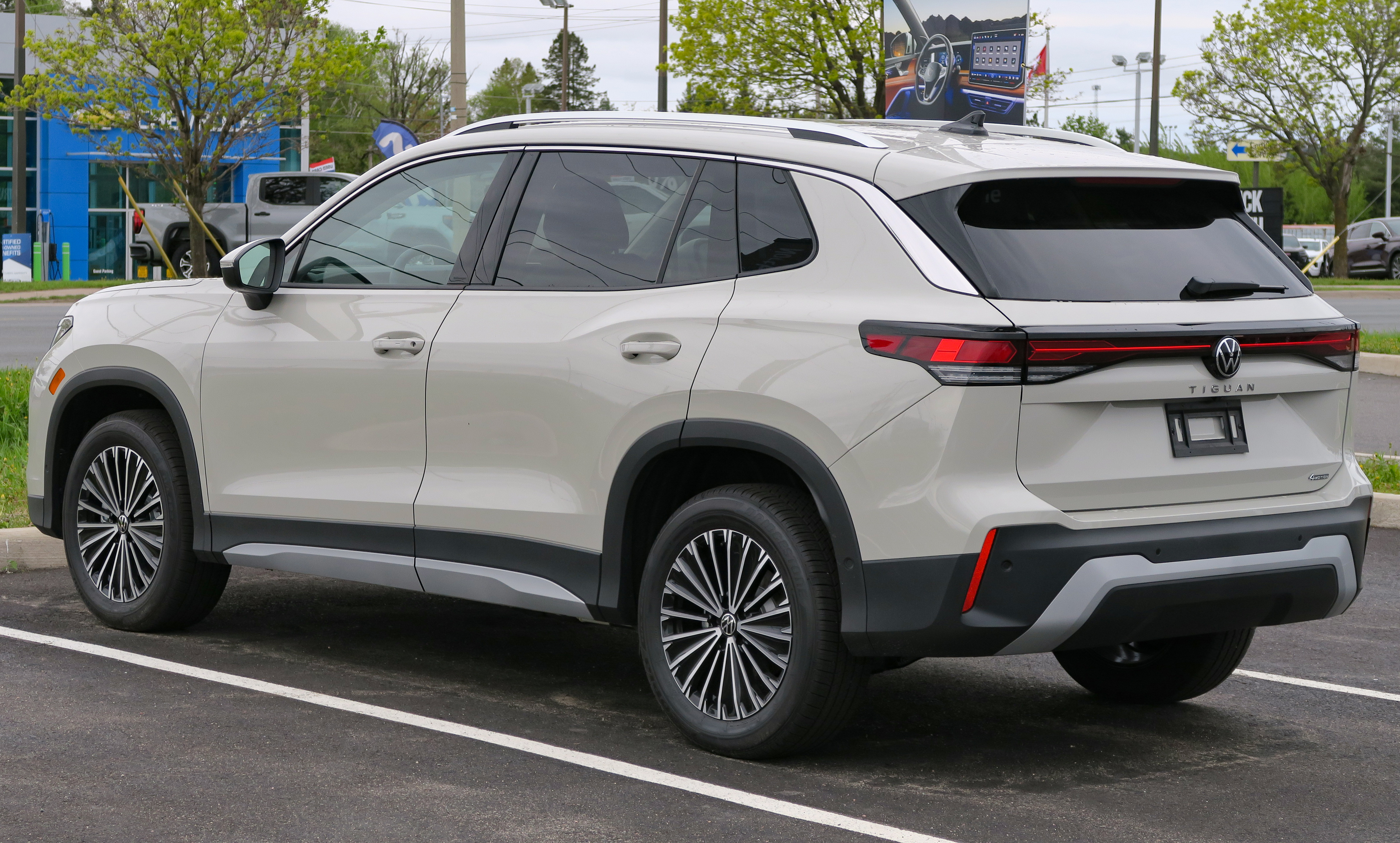
Tiguan Comfortline rear

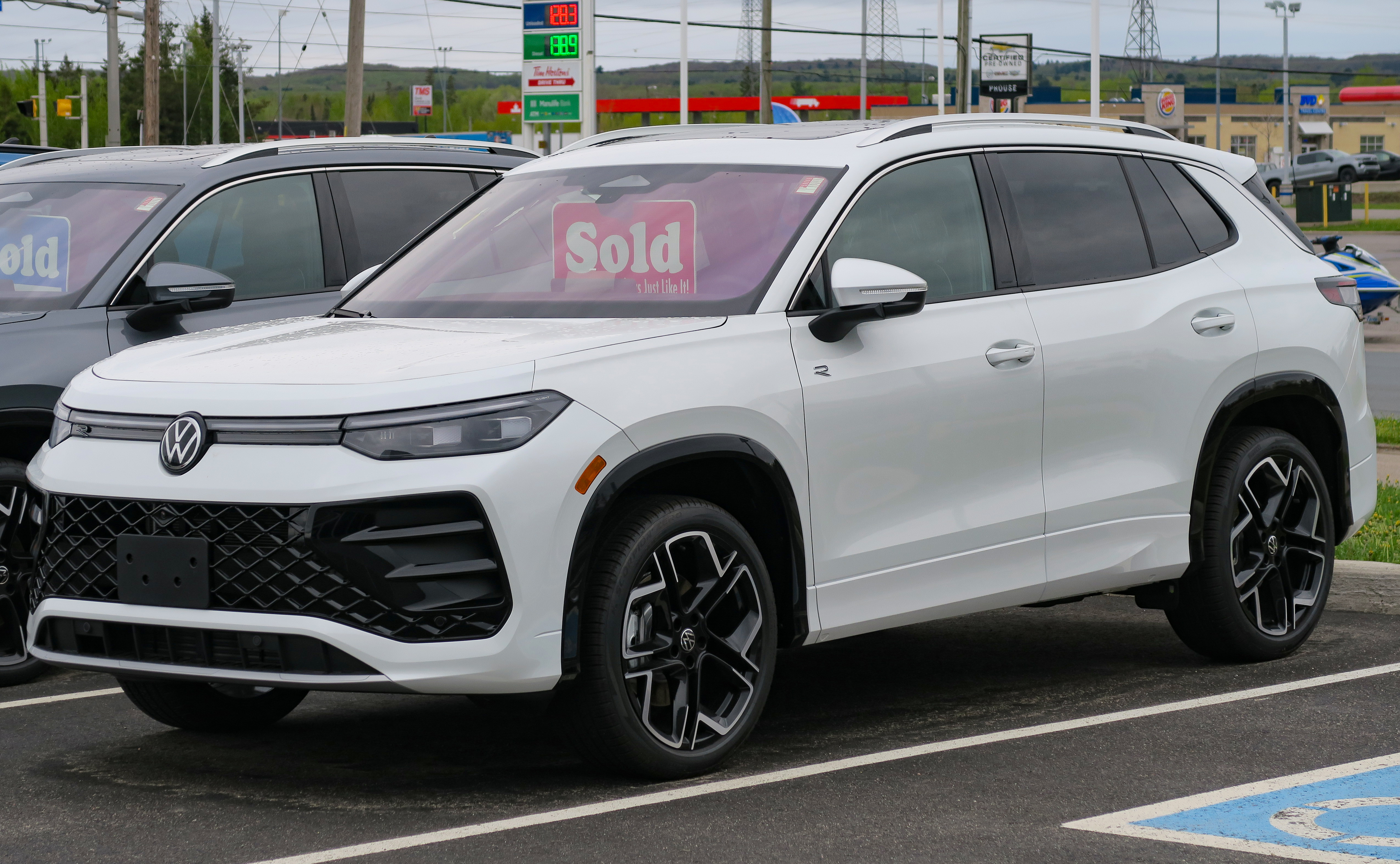
2025 Volkswagen Tiguan R-Line (North America)

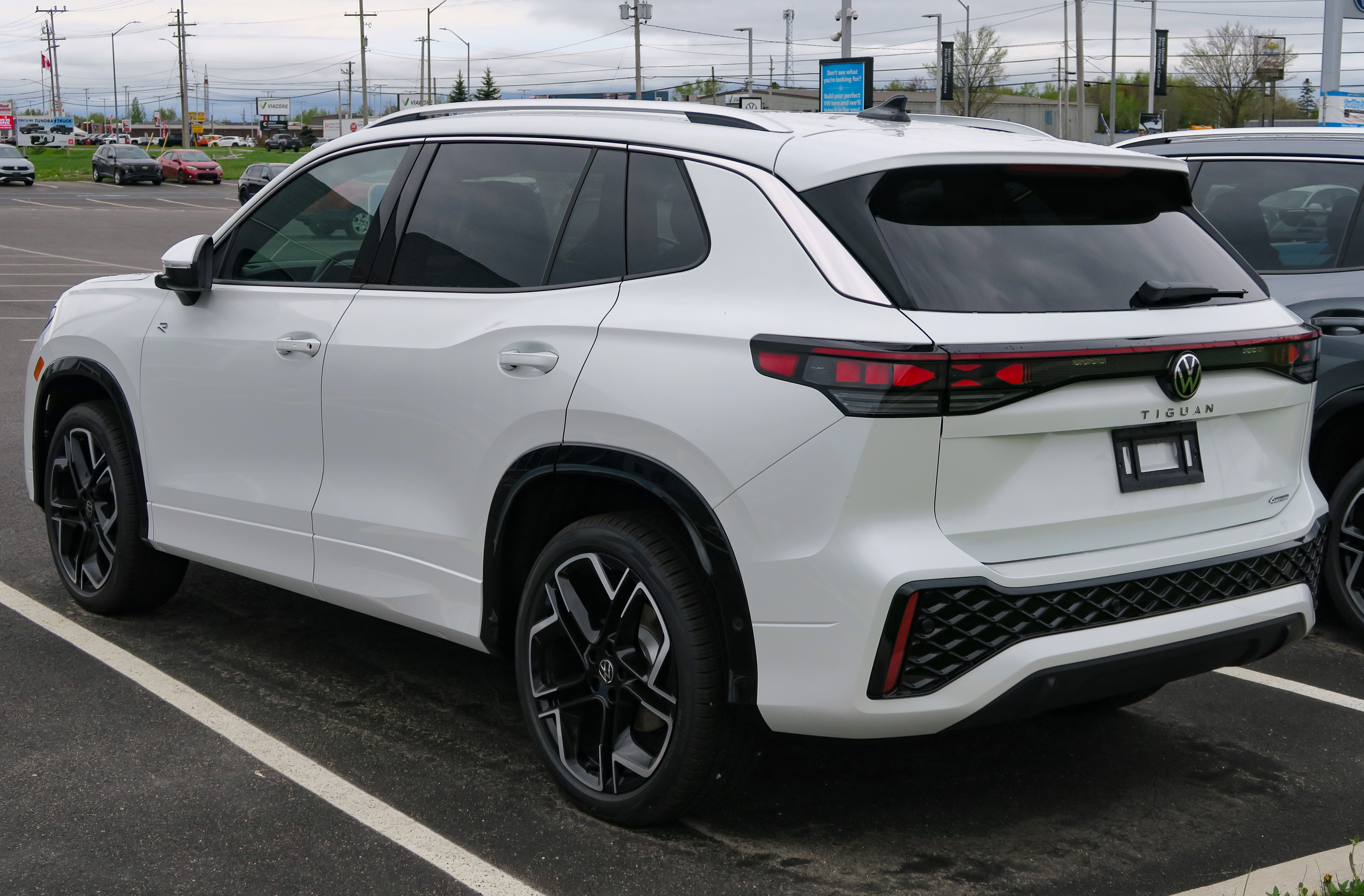
Tiguan R-Line rear

=== Safety ===
Euro NCAP test results Volkswagen Tayron 2.0 TDI 4MOTION R-Line (LHD) (2025)
Test	Points	%
Overall:	5 /5 stars	
Adult occupant:	35	87%
Child occupant:	41.7	85%
Pedestrian:	52.9	83%
Safety assist:	14.5	80%

ANCAP test results Volkswagen Tayron all variants (2025, aligned with Euro NCAP)
Test	Points	%
Overall:	5 /5 stars	
Adult occupant:	35.03	87%
Child occupant:	42.81	87%
Pedestrian:	52.91	83%
Safety assist:	15.46	85%

== Sales ==
Year	China		
Year	Tayron	Tayron PHEV	Tayron X
2018	20,235		
2019	179,428		
2020	176,595		12,051
2021	98,536		12,733
2022			
2023	123,204	3,900	8,982
2024	170,934	1,616	5,722
2025	165,744	874	2,551
