= Cupra Terramar =

Spanish compact crossover SUV

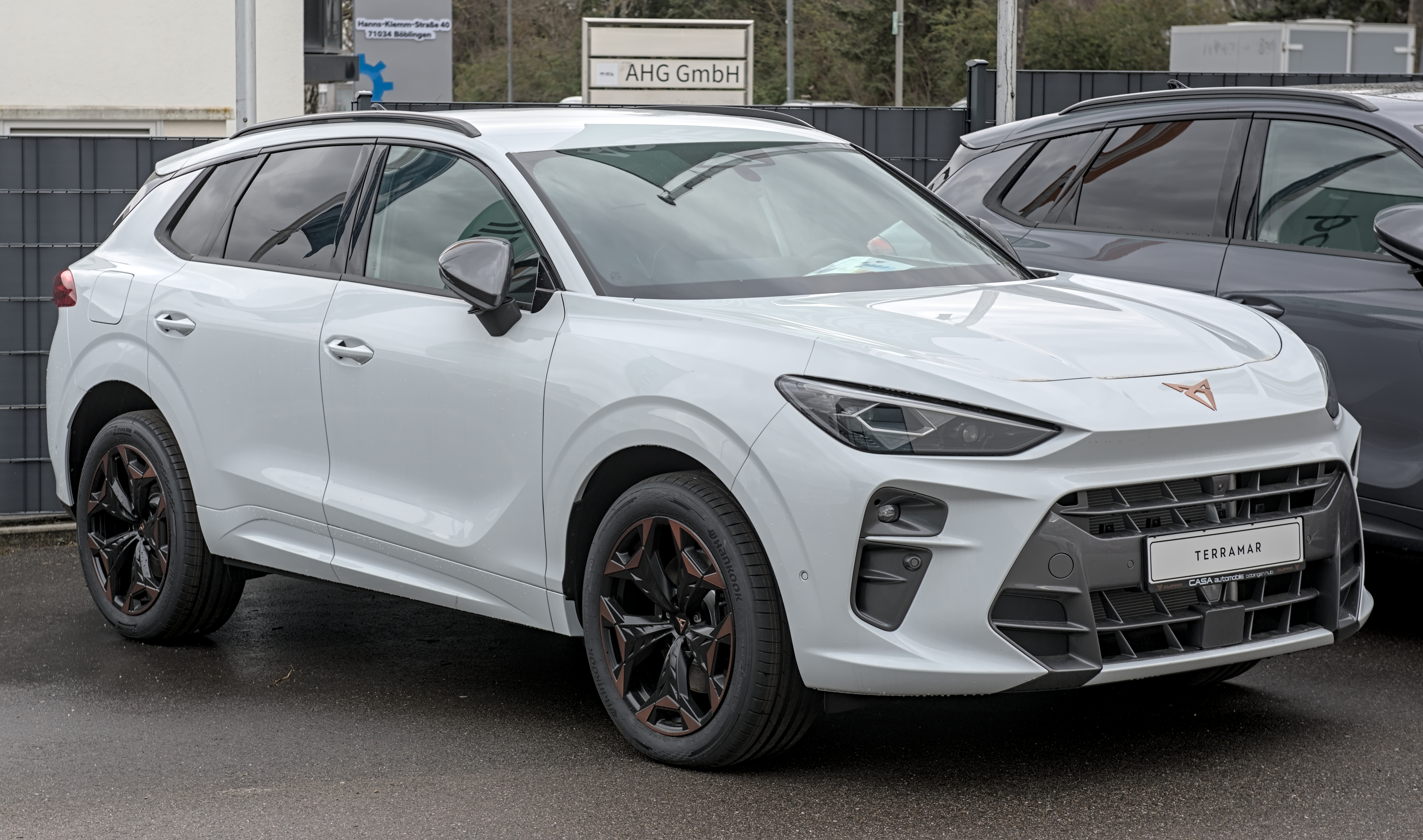
- Cupra Terramar VZ

Overview
- Manufacturer: SEAT
- Production: September 2024–present
- Assembly: Hungary: Győr (Audi Hungaria)
- Designer: Jorge Díez (Design Director, Cupra)

Body and chassis
- Class: Compact crossover SUV (C)
- Body style: 5-door SUV
- Layout: Front-engine, front-wheel-drive; Front-engine, all-wheel-drive (4Drive)
- Platform: Volkswagen Group MQB Evo
- Related: Audi Q3 F3; Škoda Kodiaq Mk2; Volkswagen Tiguan Mk3; Volkswagen Tayron Mk2

Powertrain
- Engine: Petrol: 1.5 L EA211 Evo I4-T petrol (1.5 eTSI and 1.5 eHybrid); 2.0 L EA888 I4-T petrol (2.0 TSI 4Drive)
- Electric motor: 15 kW (20 hp; 20 PS) 48-volt starter generator (1.5 eTSI); 85 kW (114 hp; 116 PS) permanent magnet synchronous (1.5 eHybrid)
- Power output: 110 kW (148 hp; 150 PS) (1.5 eTSI); 150 kW (201 hp; 204 PS) (2.0 TSI 4Drive); 195 kW (261 hp; 265 PS) (2.0 TSI 4Drive); 150 kW (201 hp; 204 PS) (1.5 e-Hybrid); 200 kW (268 hp; 272 PS) (1.5 e-Hybrid)
- Transmission: 7-speed DSG (1.5 eTSI and 2.0 TSI 4Drive); 6-speed DSG (1.5 e-Hybrid)
- Hybrid drivetrain: Mild hybrid (1.5 eTSI); Conventional (2.0 TSI 4Drive); Plug-in hybrid (1.5 e-Hybrid)
- Battery: 25.8 kWh NMC lithium-ion (1.5 e-Hybrid)

Dimensions
- Wheelbase: 2,680 mm (105.5 in)
- Length: 4,519 mm (177.9 in)
- Width: 1,863 mm (73.3 in)
- Height: 1,584 mm (62.4 in)
- Curb weight: 1,563–1,829 kg (3,446–4,032 lb)

Chronology
- Predecessor: Cupra Ateca; SEAT Ateca

The Cupra Terramar is a compact crossover SUV presented in September 2024 by Spanish performance-oriented brand, Cupra. The car is intended to replace the Cupra Ateca.

The Terramar uses an updated version of the MQB platform which underpins Cupra's ICE-powered cars. It will come in mild-hybrid, petrol and plug-in-hybrid versions, with a pure electric range of up to 100 km (62 mi). In 2022 it was announced that it would be the last Cupra launched with a combustion engine offering.

The model is named for a Spanish coastal town near Barcelona where the Autódromo de Sitges-Terramar racetrack was built in 1923. It will be built alongside the closely related third-generation Audi Q3.

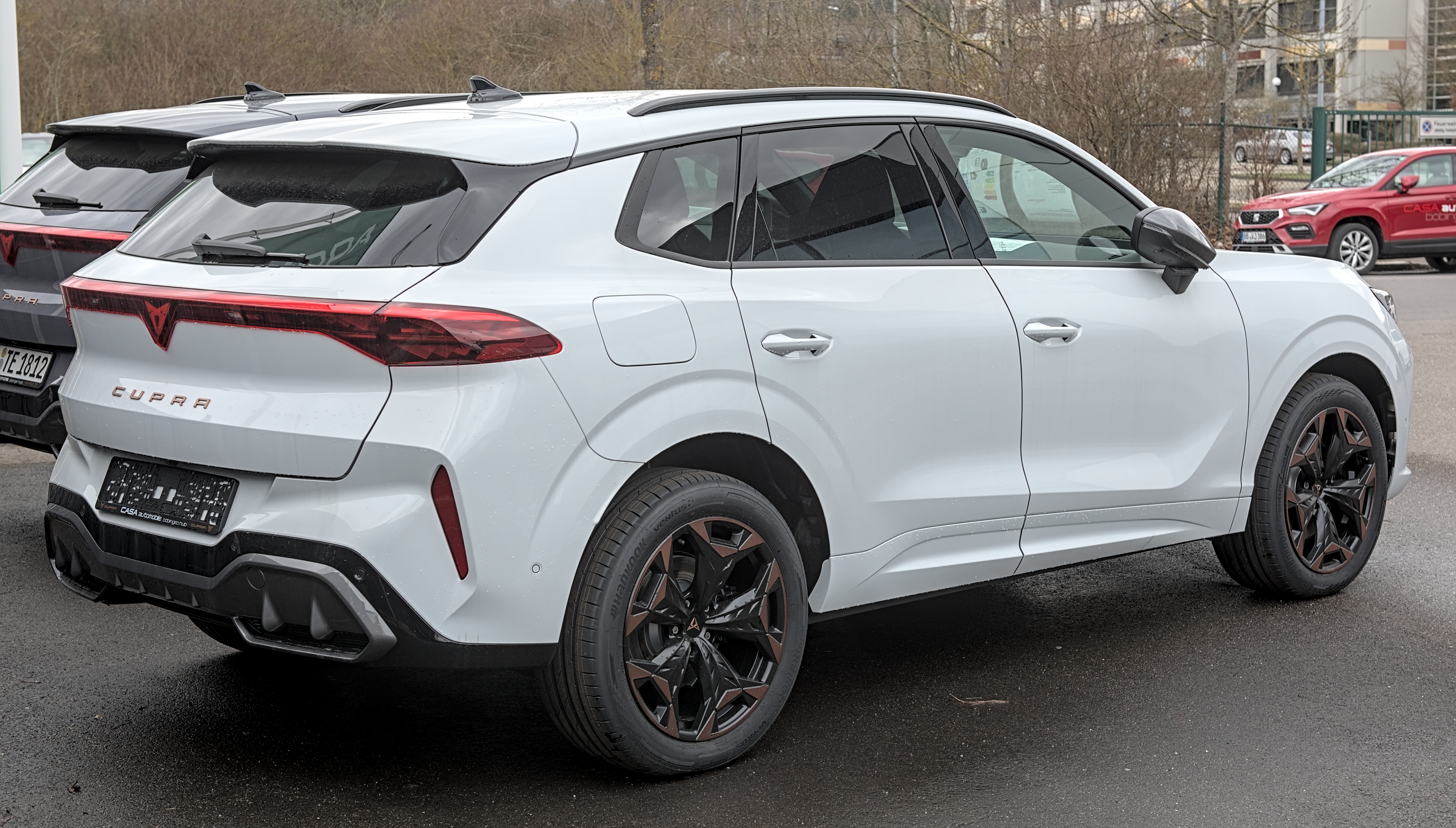
Rear view

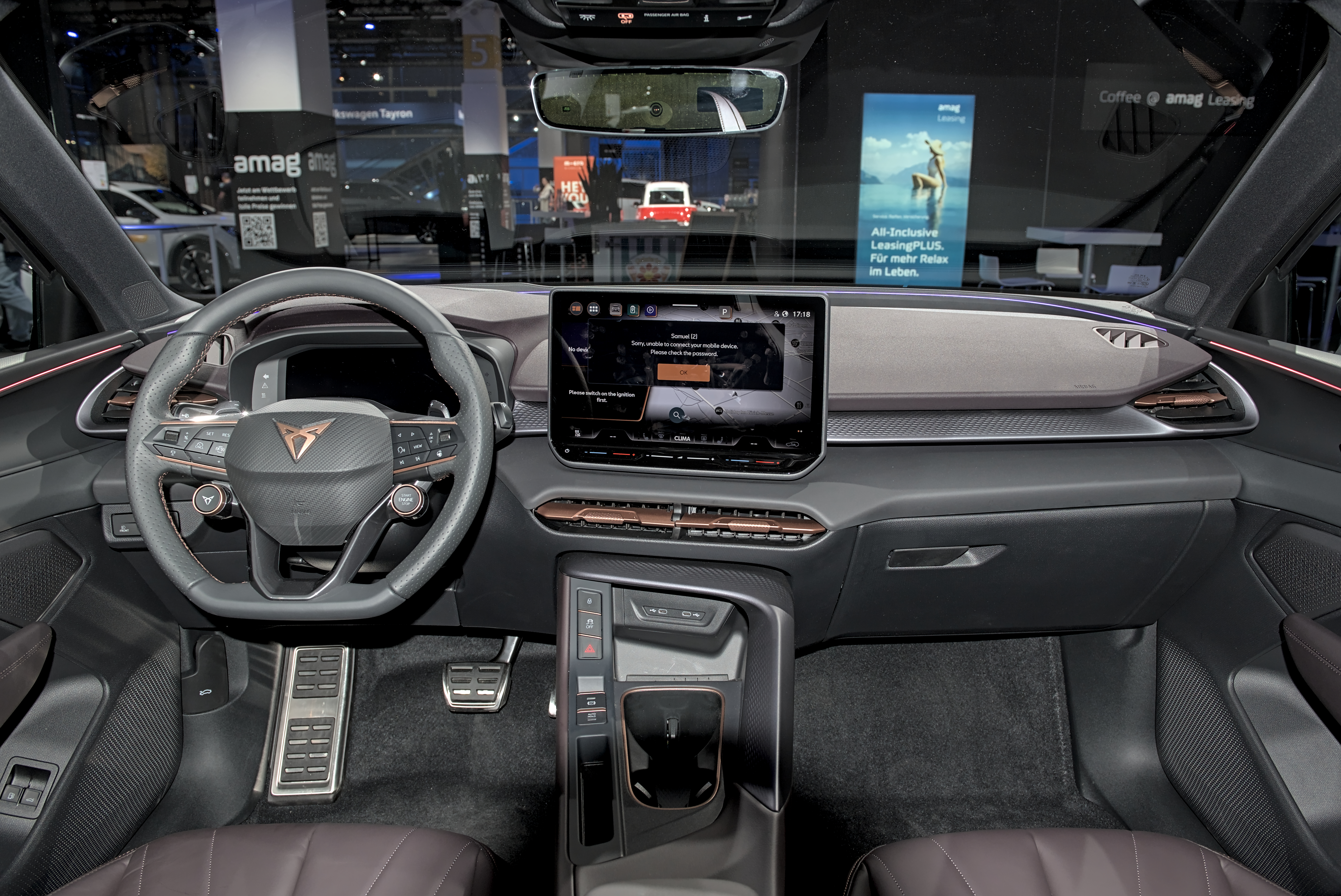
Interior

== Safety ==
ANCAP test results Cupra Terramar (2025, aligned with Euro NCAP)
Test	Points	%
Overall:	5 /5 stars	
Adult occupant:	35.89	89%
Child occupant:	43	87%
Pedestrian:	51.78	82%
Safety assist:	14.14	78%

Euro NCAP test results Cupra Terramar 1.5 TSI 200 kW eHybrid (2025)
Test	Points	%
Overall:	5 /5 stars	
Adult occupant:	35.9	89%
Child occupant:	43	87%
Pedestrian:	51.8	82%
Safety assist:	13.8	76%

== Sales and production figures ==
Year	Sales	Production
2024	4,032	16,663
2025	65,994	71,810
