= Zhenzhou =

Zhenzhou may refer to:

- Zhenzhou, Sichuan, a town in Junlian County, Sichuan, China
- Zhenzhou, Jiangsu, a town in Yizheng, Jiangsu, China

== Historical prefectures ==
- Zhen Prefecture (Jiangsu) (眞州), a prefecture between the 11th and 14th centuries in modern Jiangsu, China
- Zhen Prefecture (Hebei) (鎮州), a prefecture between the 9th and 11th centuries in modern Hebei, China
- Zhen Prefecture (Guizhou) (眞州), a prefecture between the 14th and 17th centuries in modern Guizhou, China
- Zhen Prefecture (Zhejiang) (震州), a prefecture during 6th-century Liang dynasty in modern Zhejiang, China
- Zhen Prefecture (Sichuan) (眞州), a prefecture during 8th-century Tang dynasty in modern Sichuan, China
- Zhen Prefecture (Mongolia) (鎮州), a prefecture during 11th-century Liao dynasty in modern Bulgan Province, Mongolia
- Zhen Prefecture (Hainan) (鎮州), a prefecture during 12th-century Song dynasty in modern Hainan, China
- Zhen Prefecture (Beijing) (鎮州), a prefecture during 13th-century Jin dynasty in modern Beijing, China

== See also ==
- Zhen (disambiguation)
- Zhengzhou, capital of Henan Province, China
