= Volkswagen Virtus =

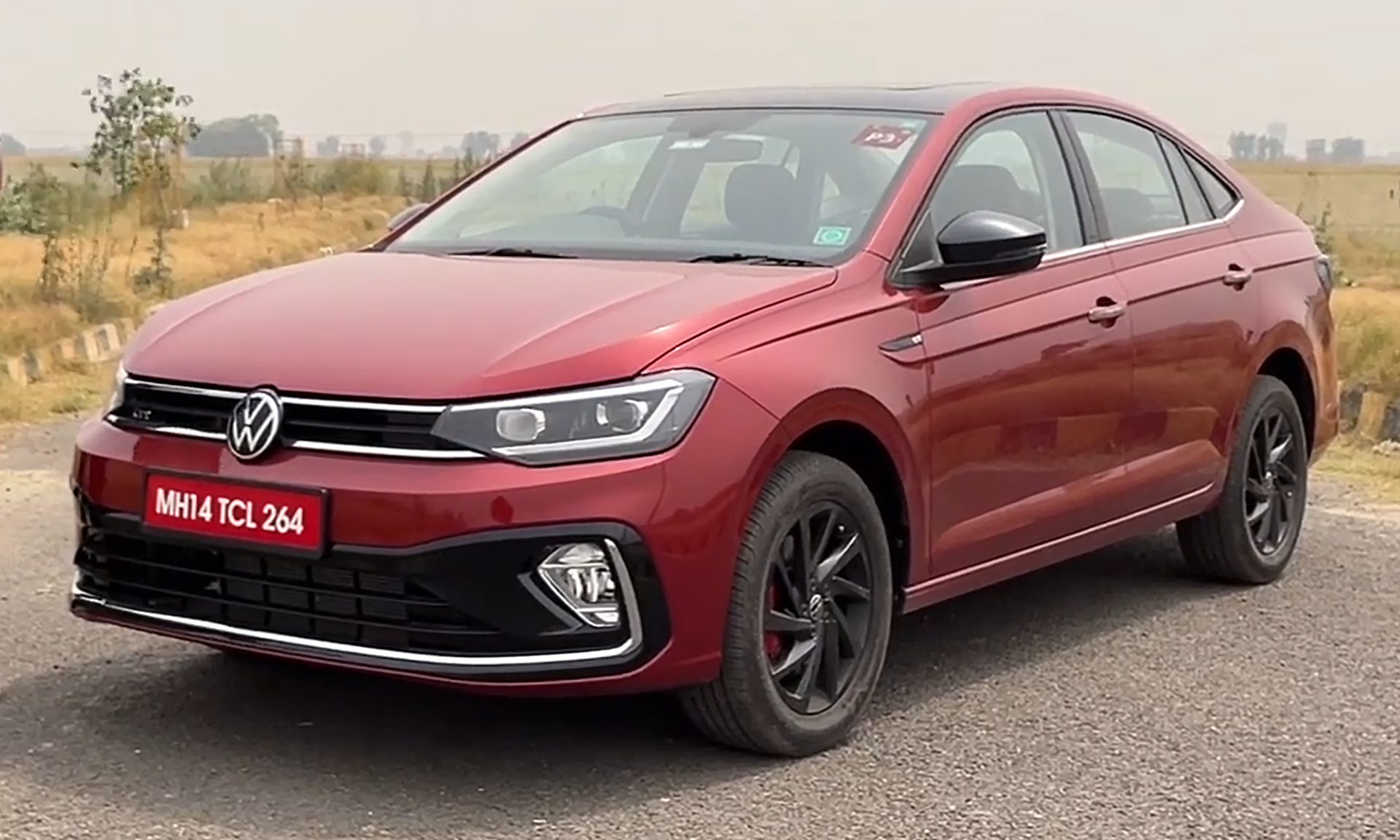
- 2022 Volkswagen Virtus 1.5 GT (India)

Overview
- Manufacturer: Volkswagen
- Also called: Volkswagen Polo Sedan (South Africa); Volkswagen Lavida XR (China); Škoda Slavia (India)
- Production: 2018–present (Brazil); 2022–present (India); 2023–present (China)
- Assembly: Brazil: São Bernardo do Campo; São José dos Pinhais (Volkswagen do Brasil); India: Chakan (Škoda VW India); China: Yizheng, Jiangsu (SAIC-VW)
- Designer: João Sammarco

Body and chassis
- Class: Subcompact car (B)
- Body style: 4-door sedan
- Platform: Volkswagen Group MQB A0; Volkswagen Group MQB A0 IN (Indian version)
- Related: Volkswagen Polo Mk6; Volkswagen Taigo/Nivus; Volkswagen T-Cross/Taigun; Škoda Kushaq

Powertrain
- Engine: Petrol: 1.0 L TSI I3; 1.4 L TSI I4; 1.5 L MPI I4; 1.5 L TSI I4; 1.6 L MSI I4
- Transmission: 6-speed manual 6-speed automatic 7-speed DSG

Dimensions
- Wheelbase: 2,651 mm (104.4 in)
- Length: 4,482–4,561 mm (176.5–179.6 in)
- Width: 1,751 mm (68.9 in)
- Height: 1,461–1,487 mm (57.5–58.5 in)

Chronology
- Predecessor: Volkswagen Vento/Polo Sedan; Volkswagen Santana (A05) (China); Volkswagen Lavida Mk2 (China)

The Volkswagen Virtus is a subcompact sedan (B-segment) manufactured by the German automaker Volkswagen since 2018. It is based on the Polo Mk6 with an extended wheelbase and the same Volkswagen Group MQB A0 platform, which it also closely shares with the Taigo/Nivus and T-Cross/Taigun.

It was first introduced in Brazil in November 2017, with sales starting in January 2018. From Brazil, the vehicle has been exported throughout Latin America. In March 2022, the vehicle was introduced in India to replace the Vento and uses the Volkswagen Group MQB A0 IN platform adapted for India.

The Virtus is also marketed as the Volkswagen Polo Sedan in South Africa since September 2022, and as the Volkswagen Lavida XR in China since June 2023. The Škoda Slavia is a redesigned version that was introduced in India, Vietnam and the Middle East.

== Markets ==
=== Brazil ===
The Virtus was introduced in Brazil on 16 November 2017 as a sedan counterpart to the Polo, and slots between the smaller Voyage and the larger Jetta in VW Brazil sedan line-up. It uses the same front fascia as the Polo, including the modifications that were made to the Polo for the South American market such as redesigned bumper. It also features a longer wheelbase which stood at 2,651 mm (104.4 in), 103 mm (4.1 in) longer than the Polo. The trunk has a capacity of 521 litres, an increase of 200 litres from the Polo.

In Brazil, all Virtus versions are sold as flex-fuel vehicles (petrol and ethanol). The base 1.6-litre MSI four-cylinder engine generates 130 PS (128 hp; 96 kW) with petrol and 118 PS (116 hp; 87 kW) with ethanol. The rest of the options are all equipped with the TSI engines, with 1.0-litre (116 PS (114 hp; 85 kW) gasoline, 128 PS (126 hp; 94 kW) ethanol), and 1.4-litre (150 PS (148 hp; 110 kW) with both fuels), the latter only available for the GTS version.

In February 2023, the Volkswagen Virtus sold in Brazil received a restyling, which brought updates to the model. The GTS version was discontinued, being replaced by a version called Exclusive which is powered with the 1.4-litre TSI engine (150 PS (148 hp; 110 kW) with both fuels). In addition, the basic versions are powered by the 170 TSI 1.0-litre engine (109 PS (108 hp; 80 kW) gasoline, 116 PS (114 hp; 85 kW) ethanol) which replaced the base 1.6-litre MSI four-cylinder engine. The mid-range versions, the Comfortline and Highline variants retains the 200 TSI 1.0 litre engine, with 1.0-litre (116 PS (114 hp; 85 kW) gasoline, 128 PS (126 hp; 94 kW) ethanol).

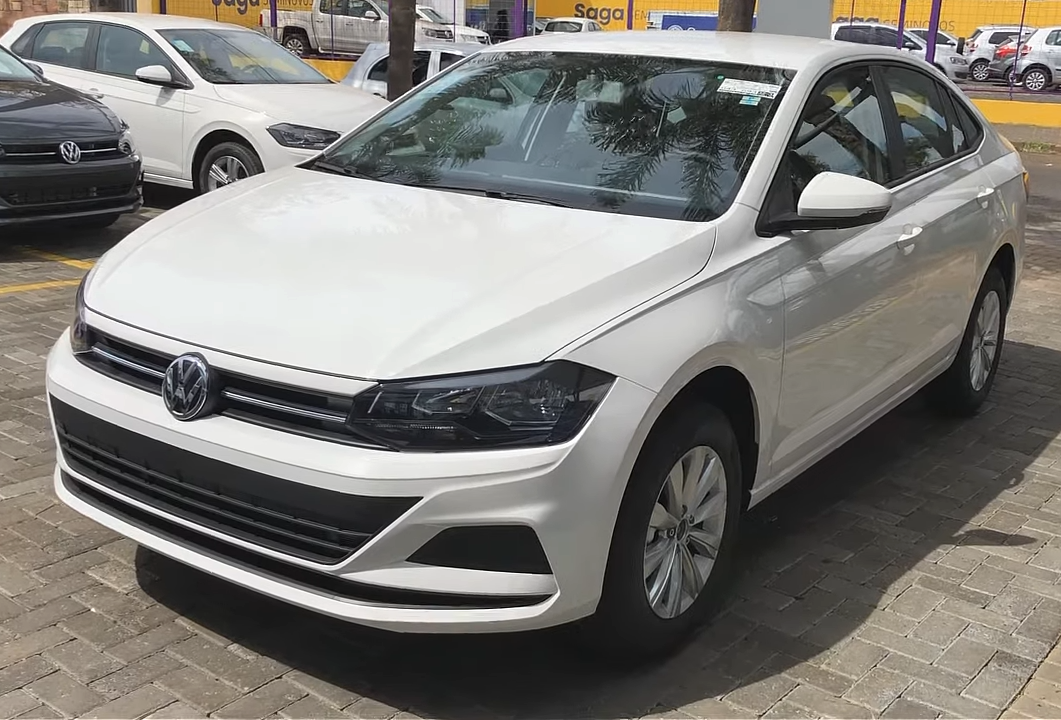
2019 Volkswagen Virtus 1.6 MSI (Brazil)

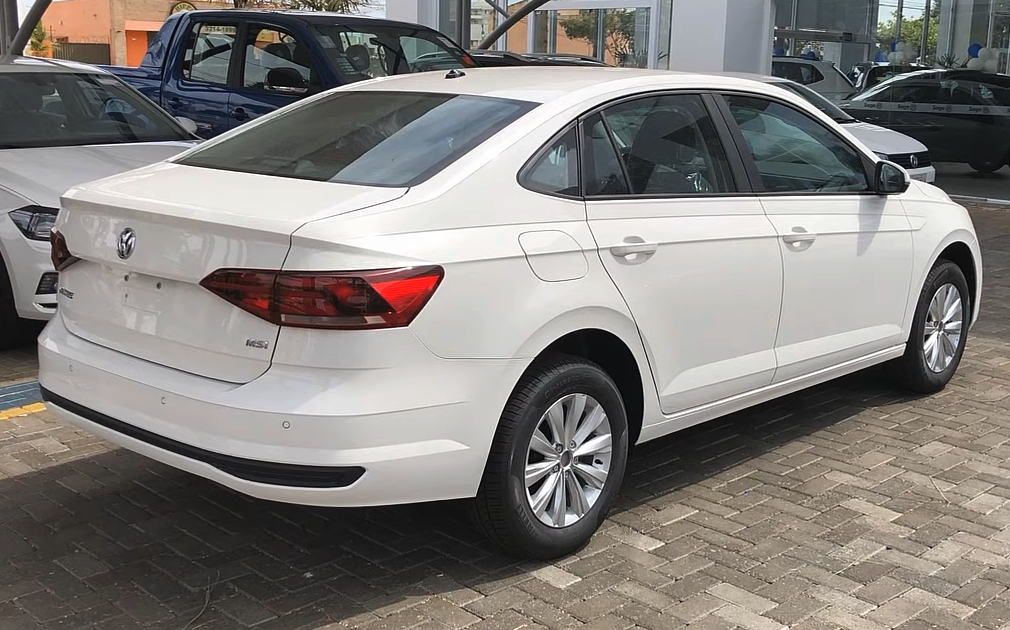
Rear view (Brazil, pre-facelift)

==== Powertrain ====
Petrol engines
Model	Displacement	Power	Torque	Transmission
1.0 170 TSI	999 cc I3	109 PS (80 kW; 108 hp) (with petrol)	165 N⋅m (122 lb⋅ft)	5-speed manual or 6-speed automatic
1.0 170 TSI	999 cc I3	116 PS (85 kW; 114 hp) (with ethanol)	165 N⋅m (122 lb⋅ft)	5-speed manual or 6-speed automatic
1.0 200 TSI	999 cc I3	118 PS (87 kW; 116 hp) (with petrol)	200 N⋅m (148 lb⋅ft)	6-speed manual or 6-speed automatic
1.0 200 TSI	999 cc I3	130 PS (96 kW; 128 hp) (with ethanol)	200 N⋅m (148 lb⋅ft)	6-speed manual or 6-speed automatic
1.4 250 TSI	1,395 cc I4	150 PS (110 kW; 148 hp)	250 N⋅m (184 lb⋅ft)	6-speed automatic
1.6 MSI	1,598 cc I4	110 PS (81 kW; 108 hp)	155 N⋅m (114 lb⋅ft)	5-speed manual or 6-speed automatic

=== Argentina ===
The Virtus was released in Argentina in February 2018 with a sole 1.6-litre MSI engined variant with a 6-speed automatic transmission. It is currently offered in four trim levels: Sense, Trendline, Highline and Exclusive.

=== Mexico ===
In Mexico, the Virtus was launched in August 2019, equipped with a 1.6-litre MSI four-cylinder with 110 PS (108 hp; 81 kW). During its initial release, the model was imported from Brazil and placed between the Indian-made Vento and the Jetta.

In September 2022, the updated Virtus was released for the 2023 model year. It is imported from India, while the Vento was discontinued. An optional 1.0-litre TSI engine was introduced alongside the older 1.6-litre engine.

=== India ===
The Virtus was introduced in India on 8 March 2022 as a replacement to the Vento and the sister model of the Škoda Slavia. It was launched with the facelifted appearance, differentiated with the Polo and with a revised dashboard design. The Indian version is localized with up to 95% of its parts. As with the Taigun, Škoda Kushaq and Škoda Slavia, it uses the MQB A0 IN platform, and will be exported to 25 countries.

Available models are the Dynamic Line with the locally produced three-cylinder 1.0 TSI engine producing 115 PS (85 kW; 113 hp) and Performance Line equipped with the four-cylinder 1.5-liter TSI engine featuring cylinder deactivation technology with 150 PS (110 kW; 148 hp).

The Virtus GT is the range-topping model which features cosmetic upgrades as compared to the Dynamic line such as dual-tone roof along with sunroof, red accents, red brake calipers and aluminum pedals similar to GTI models. Equipment list included ventilated front seats, wireless smartphone charging, an eight-inch digital instrument cluster, sunroof, and ambient lighting. Sales started in June 2022. The car became the top selling midsize sedan during the first half of 2024.

The facelifted Virtus is expected to be launched in India on 11 December 2026, featuring revised exterior styling, updated features, and an eight-speed automatic gearbox for the 1.0-litre TSI engine.

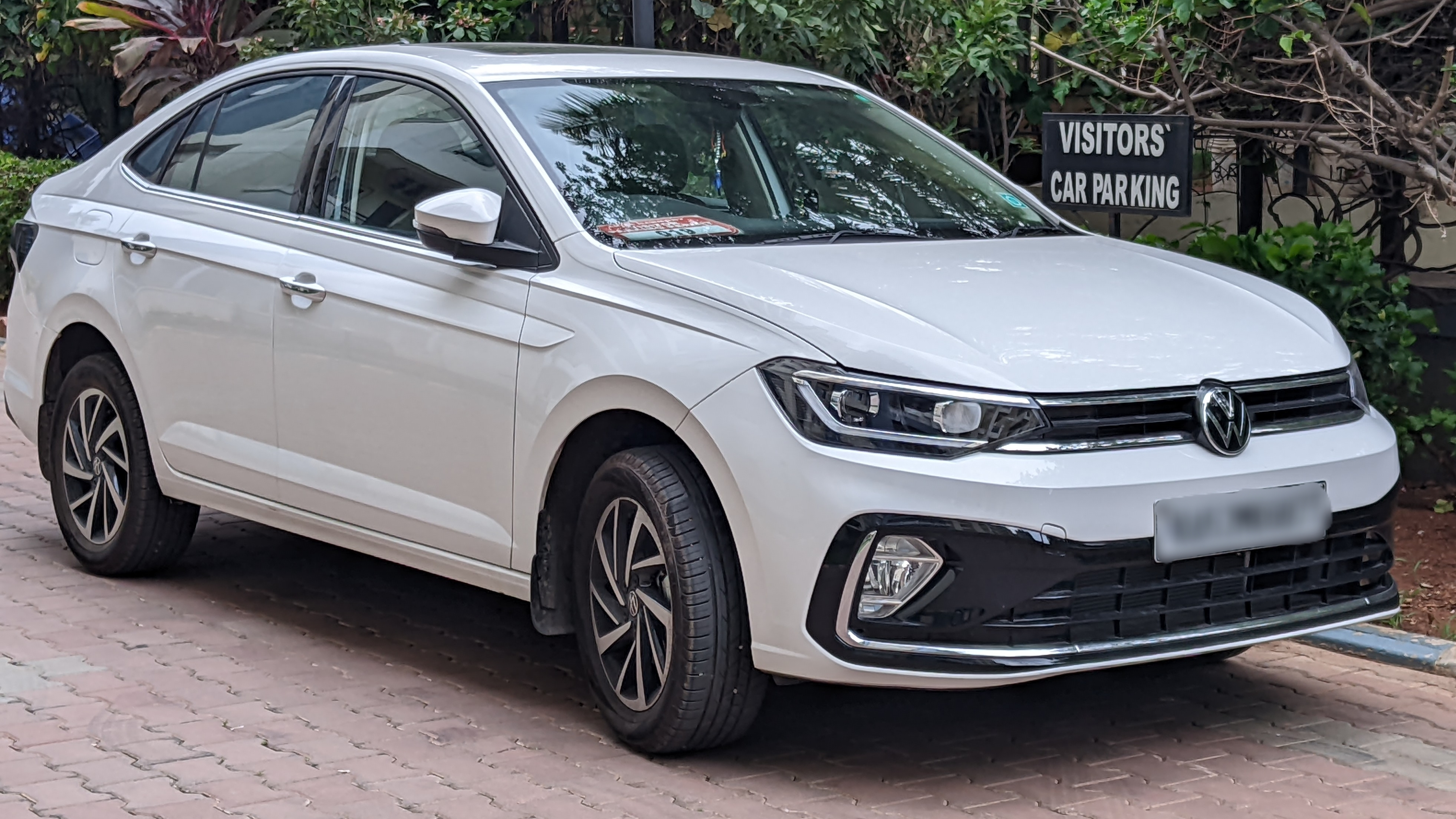
2023 Volkswagen Virtus Topline (India)

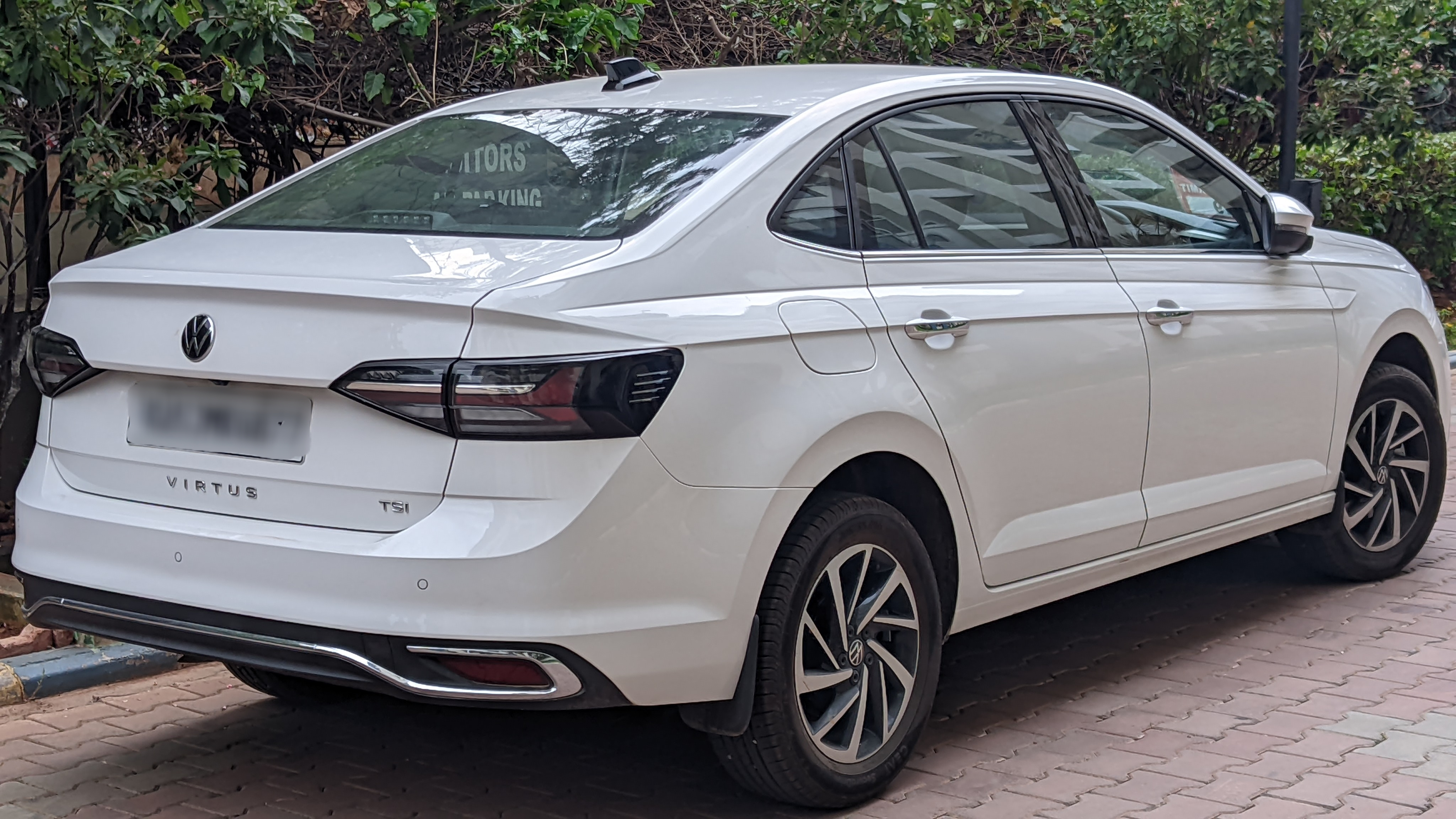
Rear view

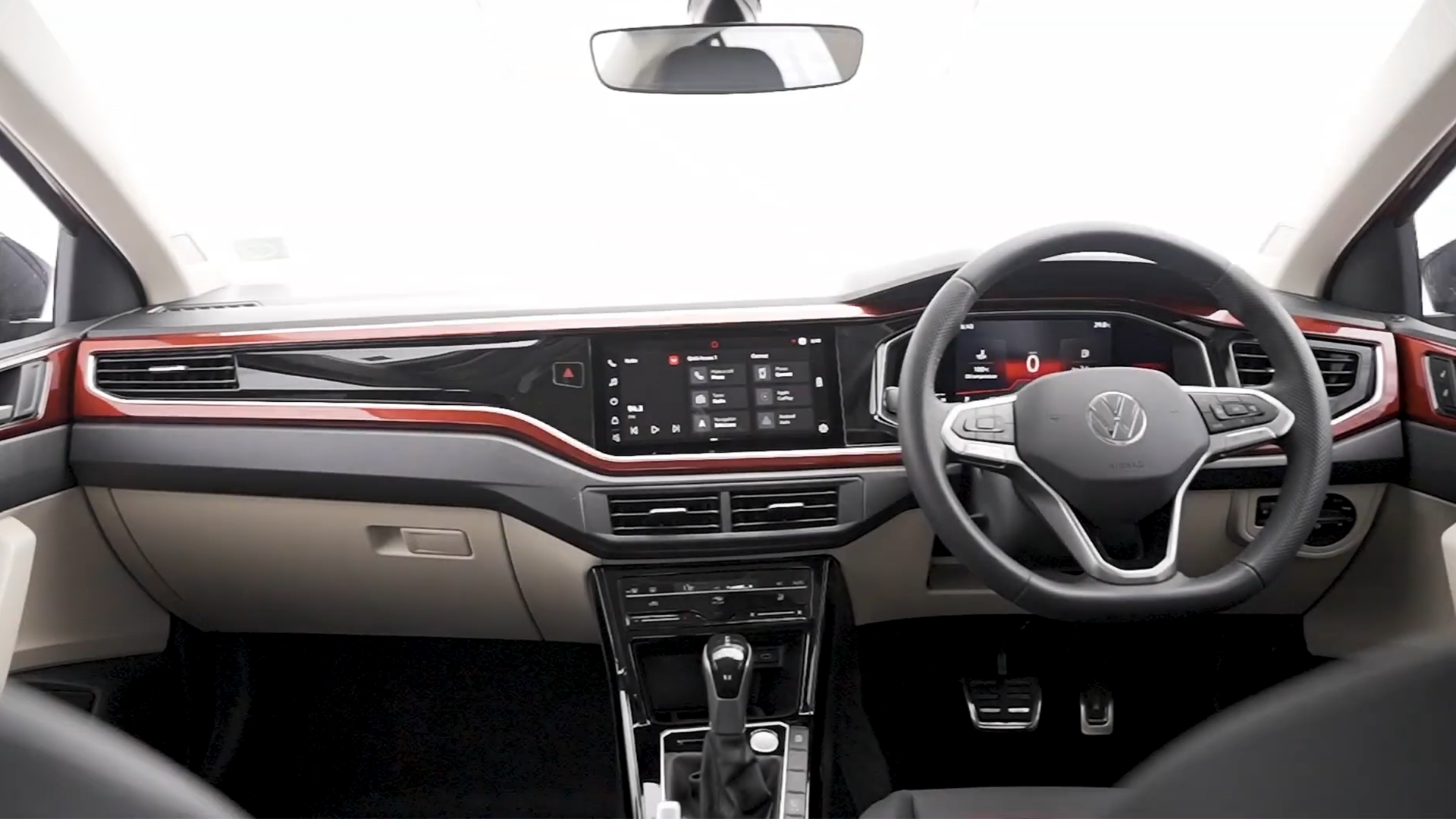
Interior (GT)

==== Powertrain ====
Petrol engines
Model	Displacement	Power	Torque	Transmission	Top Speed	Acceleration 0-100 km/h (0-62 mph)
1.0 TSI	999 cc I3	115 PS (85 kW; 113 hp)	178 N⋅m (131 lb⋅ft)	6-speed manual or 6-speed automatic	189 km/h (117 mph)	9.7 s
1.5 TSI	1,498 cc I4	150 PS (110 kW; 148 hp)	250 N⋅m (184 lb⋅ft)	7-speed DSG	204 km/h (127 mph)	7.6 s

=== China ===
The vehicle was introduced in June 2023 in China as the Lavida XR, sharing the nameplate with the larger and more advanced Lavida sedan while targeting younger customers. It is mostly identical to the Virtus, with few changes such as different grille pattern, chrome on the air intake on the front bumpers, and dark-tinted tail lights. It is powered by a 1.5-litre MPI engine producing 108 PS (79 kW; 107 hp) and 141 N⋅m (104 lb⋅ft) with a 6-speed automatic transmission. It replaced the second-generation Lavida and the Santana.

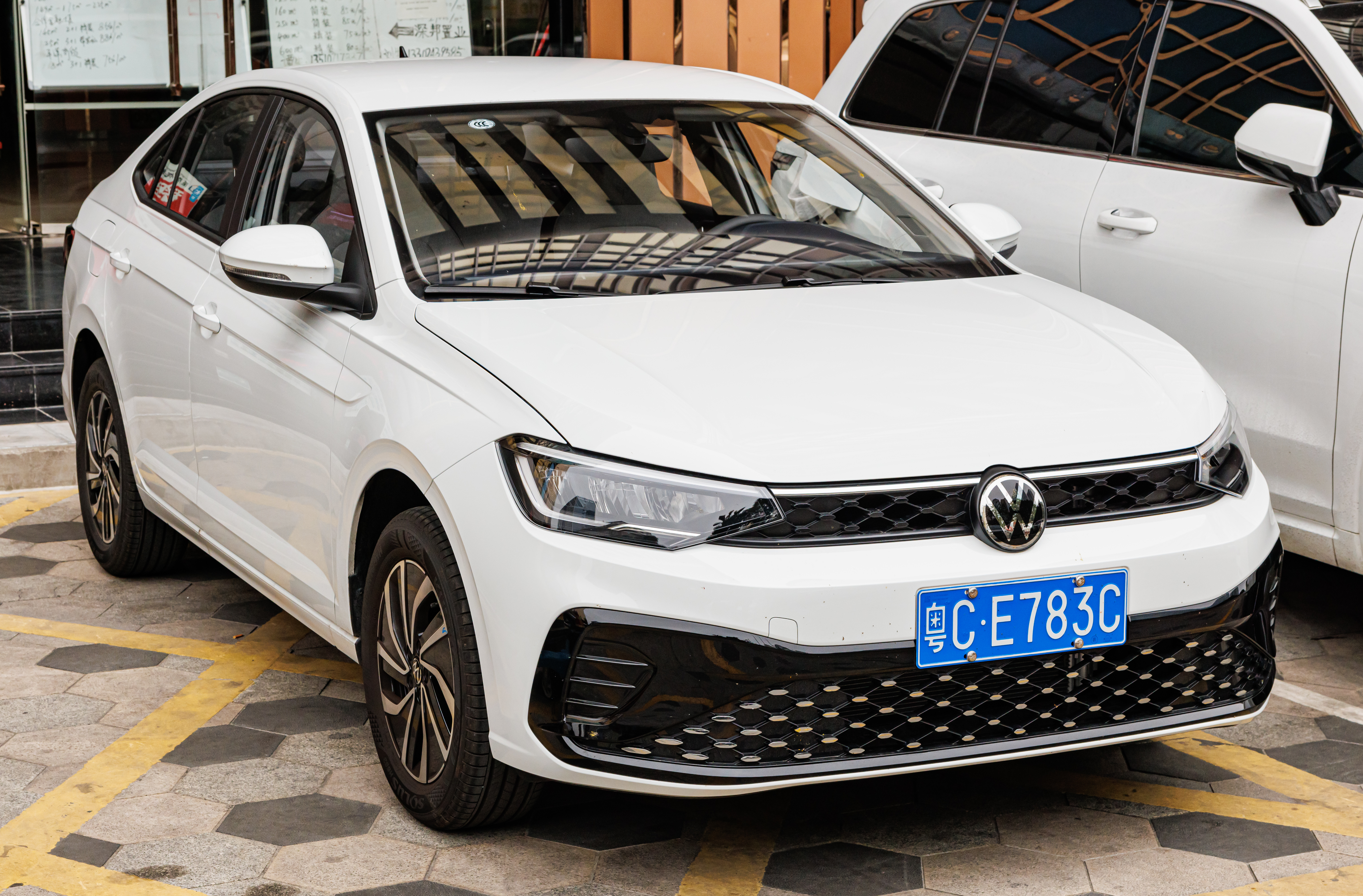
2023 Lavida XR

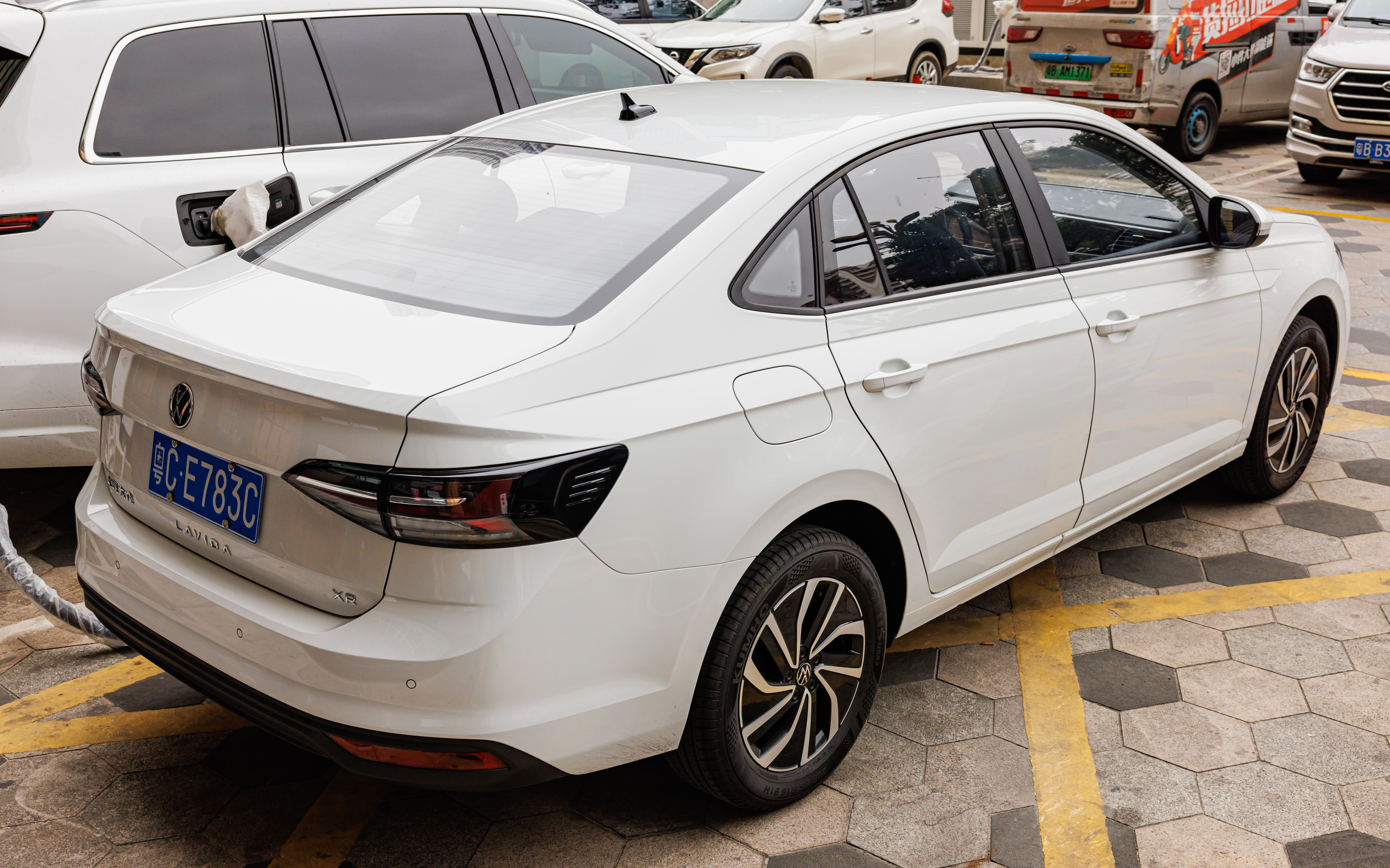
Rear view

== Safety ==
=== Latin America ===
The made-in-Brazil Volkswagen Virtus was sold in Latin America with a standard safety specification of four airbags including two frontal airbags and two seat-mounted side combination torso-head airbags, i-Size approved ISOFIX anchorages, three-point seatbelts in all seats, front and rear seatbelt pretensioners. Electronic Stability Control and post-collision braking were sold in volumes high enough for a Latin NCAP 2.0 five star rating.

The Virtus was tested by Latin NCAP 2.0 in 2017 and achieved five stars for both adult and child protection, performing well across all areas of assessment including the ESC test and side, front and pole impacts (the last two were carried over from the Polo based on technical evidence supplied by Volkswagen). The Virtus also received an award from Latin NCAP Advanced for its pedestrian protection.

Latin NCAP 2.0 test results Volkswagen Virtus + 4 Airbags (2018, based on Euro NCAP 2008)
Test	Points	Stars
Adult occupant:	32.56/34.0	5 /5 stars
Child occupant:	43.00/49.00	5 /5 stars

In 2020, Latin NCAP introduced a geometric evaluation for head protection airbags for rear occupants; the updated Virtus for Latin America is equipped with curtain airbags instead of the older seat-mounted combination torso-head airbags, and is fitted with rear-seat belt reminders. Higher trim levels are also sold with Autonomous Emergency Braking, which is part of Latin NCAP's 2020 assessment protocols. Latin NCAP 3.0 reassessed the facelifted Virtus for Latin America in 2022 (similar to Euro NCAP 2014), and it achieved the maximum five star safety rating.

Latin NCAP 3.0 test results Volkswagen New Virtus + 6 Airbags (2022, similar to Euro NCAP 2014)
Test	Points	%
Overall:	5 /5 stars	
Adult occupant:	36.94	92%
Child occupant:	45.00	92%
Pedestrian:	25.48	53%
Safety assist:	36.54	85%

=== India ===
The Virtus is sold in India with a standard safety kit of six airbags, i-Size compatible ISOFIX anchorages, Electronic Stability Control, three-point seatbelts for all seats, front and rear seatbelt pretensioners, post-collision braking and a tyre pressure monitoring system (TPMS).

In April 2023, the Virtus was awarded five stars for adult and child occupant protection by the Global New Car Assessment Programme (Global NCAP 2.0, similar to Latin NCAP 2016) under its Safer Cars for India project after testing performed at Škoda's expense. In the frontal offset impact of the Virtus' corporate twin, the Škoda Slavia, against a deformable aluminium honeycomb at 64km/h, dummy readings indicated low or limited risk of serious injury to all critical body regions, the passenger compartment remained stable and Škoda demonstrated that the car's dual retractor-lap pretensioning system would protect the knees of occupants of different sizes or seating positions from impact with hard points in the fascia. However, moderate rearward intrusion of the brake pedal into the footwell resulted in protection of the driver's feet being rated marginal.

In the side mobile barrier impact, performed on a Virtus unit, deceleration of the driver's head indicated there was hard contact with the roof liner, and protection was downrated to adequate despite dummy readings of HIC not indicating a high enough risk of serious injury. Dummy readings of deflection of the driver's ribs and forces in his pubic symphysis indicated a limited risk of serious thoracic and abdominal injury. In the side pole test, dummy readings of rib deflection indicated a moderate risk of serious fracture, but the optional curtain airbags fitted to the test unit worked well to produce head injury readings well within the tolerances allowed.

Using the Britax Dualfix child restraints selected by Volkswagen and installed rearward-facing using i-Size anchorages, both the child dummies achieved maximum points for dynamics, but the Virtus lost points in the vehicle-based portion of the assessment because it does not offer a means to disconnect the front passenger airbag, should the need to install a rearward-facing child restraint on that seat arise. The Virtus met minimum European regulatory requirements for electronic stability control performance and pedestrian protection.

The rating for the Virtus has not yet been extended to Global NCAP's Safer Cars for Africa project. In South Africa, where the Virtus is sold as the Polo Sedan, side thorax or head (curtain) airbags are not available on any variant, so the Polo Sedan will not be eligible for the side pole test required for a rating of four stars or better.

Global NCAP 2.0 test results (India) Volkswagen Virtus / Škoda Slavia (2023, similar to Latin NCAP 2016)
Test	Score	Stars
Adult occupant protection	29.71/34.00	5 /5 stars
Child occupant protection	42.00/49.00	5 /5 stars

== Sales ==
Year	Brazil	Mexico
2018	41,640	
2019	46,883	4,898
2020	30,886	6,769
2021	20,571	8,552
2022	5,621	7,255
2023	27,096	18,808
2024	32,359	30,945
2025	36,980	25,040
