= Škoda Slavia =

Subcompact sedan

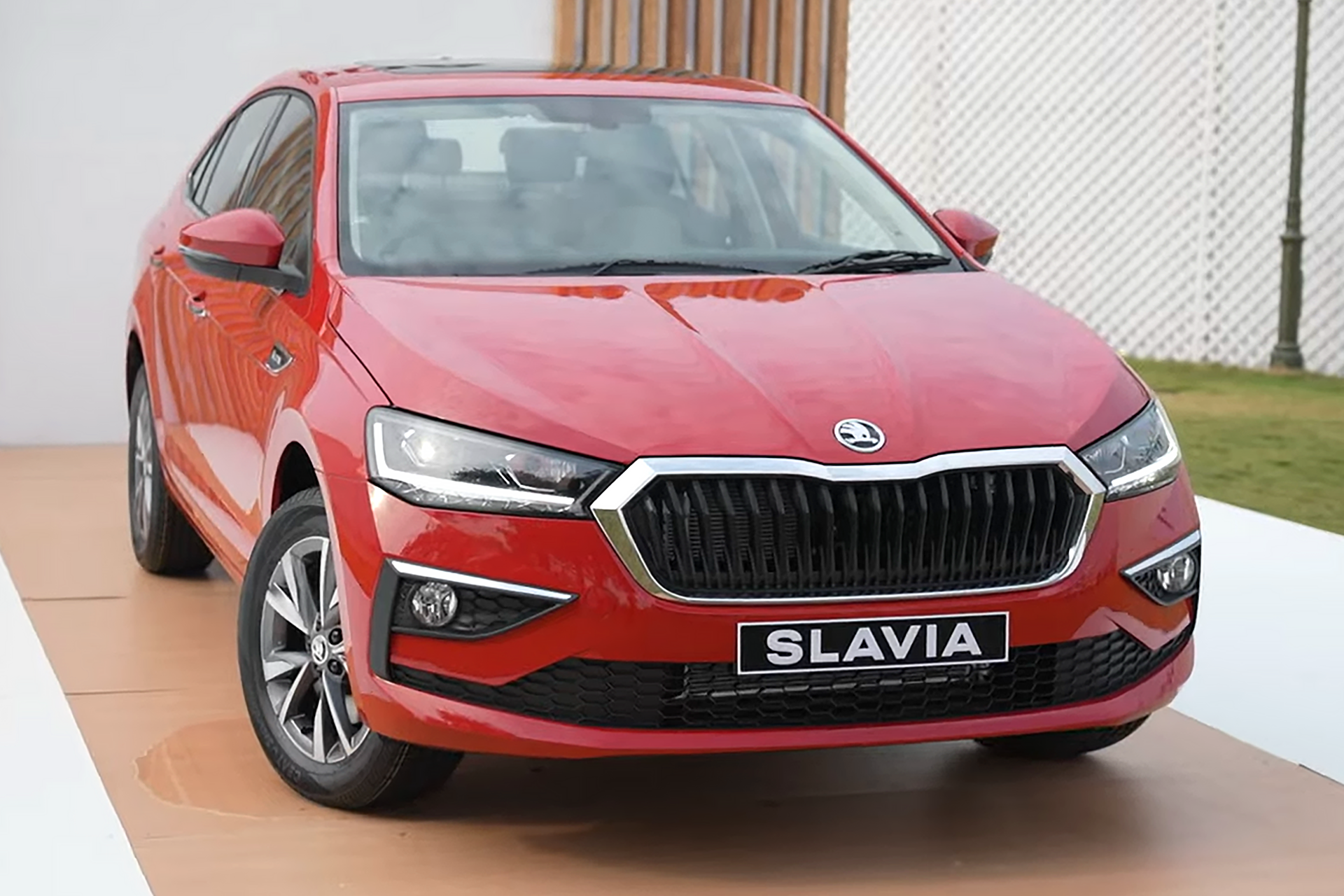
- 2021 Škoda Slavia Style (India)

Overview
- Manufacturer: Škoda Auto
- Also called: Volkswagen Virtus
- Production: 2022–present
- Assembly: India: Chakan (Škoda VW India); Vietnam: Quảng Ninh (Thanh Cong Group)

Body and chassis
- Class: Subcompact car (B)
- Body style: 4-door sedan
- Platform: Volkswagen Group MQB A0 IN
- Related: Volkswagen Polo Mk6; Volkswagen Taigo/Nivus; Škoda Kushaq; Volkswagen T-Cross/Taigun

Powertrain
- Engine: Petrol: 1.0 L TSI 115 I3; 1.5 L TSI 150 I4
- Transmission: 6-speed manual 6-speed automatic 7-speed DSG

Dimensions
- Wheelbase: 2,651 mm (104.4 in)
- Length: 4,541 mm (178.8 in)
- Width: 1,752 mm (69.0 in)
- Height: 1,487 mm (58.5 in)

Chronology
- Predecessor: Škoda Rapid (India)

The Škoda Slavia is a subcompact sedan (B-segment) manufactured by Škoda primarily for the Indian market. It was introduced in November 2021 and has been produced since 2022. Built on the MQB A0 IN platform adapted for India, the vehicle is based on the Volkswagen Virtus sedan. The Slavia replaced the Volkswagen Polo-based Rapid.

== Overview ==
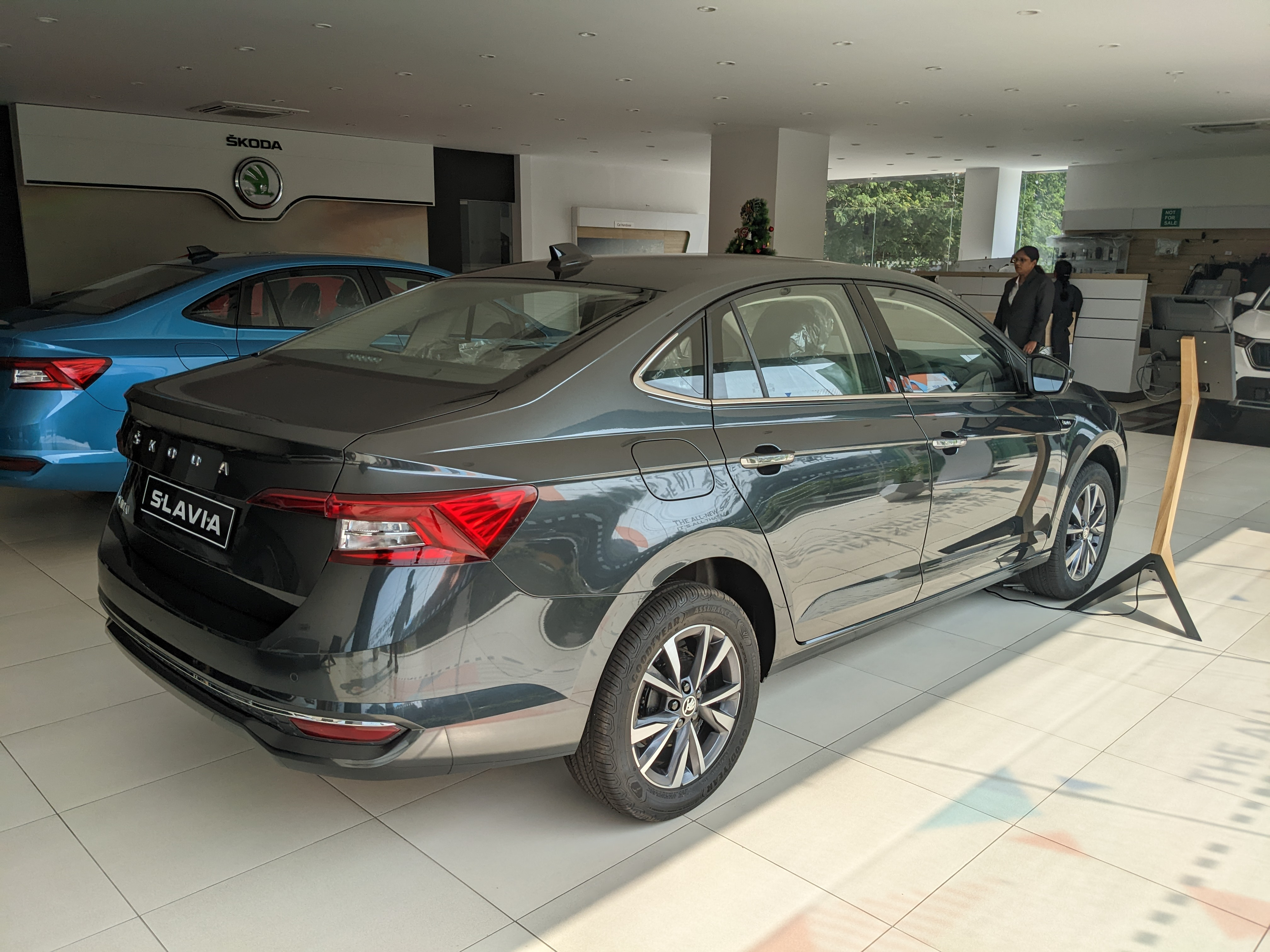
Rear view

The Slavia was introduced on 18 November 2021. Compared to the preceding Rapid, the Slavia is 128 mm (5.0 in) longer, 53 mm (2.1 in) wider, and 20 mm (0.8 in) taller with a 98 mm (3.9 in) longer wheelbase. At launch, the Slavia in India is offered in three trims, which are the base-spec Active, mid-spec Ambition and top-spec Style.

The Slavia is available with a choice of two turbocharged petrol engines. The entry-level option is a 1.0-litre three-cylinder TSI unit producing 115 PS (113 hp; 85 kW) and paired to either a 6-speed manual or a 6-speed torque converter automatic. The more powerful option is a 1.5-litre four-cylinder TSI motor with 150 PS (148 hp; 110 kW) that gets a 7-speed DSG gearbox and formerly, a 6-speed manual gearbox too. The 1.5 TSI is also equipped with the cylinder deactivation technology. The manual transmission for the 1.5 TSI engine was discontinued by September 2024.

The Škoda Slavia contains 95% local parts.

== Facelift ==
Slavia facelift was revealed on 18 August 2026 with updated design, bigger instrument cluster screen, rear massage seats and 360 degree camera.

In October 2026, Skoda Auto India launched the facelifted Slavia in India starting at Rs.10 lakh (ex-showroom), introducing updated exterior styling, a 360-degree cameras, an improved air conditioning system and a new 8-speed torque converter automatic transmission for the 1.0-liter TSI engine.

== Export markets ==
=== Vietnam ===
The Slavia is assembled from CKD in Vietnam by Thanh Cong Group since summer 2025.

=== Brunei ===
As the follow-up of the reintroduction of Škoda Auto brand in Brunei, Škoda Auto's distributor in Brunei, TCY Motors unveiled the Slavia, offered only in the Style variant powered with 1.0-litre TSI petrol engine mated with 6-speed automatic and other Škoda cars on 24 January 2024.

=== Middle East ===
From late 2026, the Slavia is to be exported from India and sold by Volkswagen Group Middle East in Bahrain, Kuwait, Lebanon, Oman, Qatar, Saudi Arabia and the United Arab Emirates.

== Powertrain ==
Petrol engines
Model	Displacement	Valvetrain configuration	Power	Torque	Transmission	Top speed	Acceleration 0–100 km/h (0-62 mph)
1.0 TSI	999 cc I3	inline-3 DOHC	115 PS (85 kW; 113 hp)	175 N⋅m (129 lb⋅ft)	6-speed manual or 6-speed automatic	189 km/h (117 mph)	9.7 s
1.5 TSI	1,498 cc I4	inline-4 DOHC	150 PS (110 kW; 148 hp)	250 N⋅m (184 lb⋅ft)	7-speed DSG	203 km/h (126 mph)	7.6 s

== Safety ==
In April 2023, the Slavia was awarded five stars for both adult and child occupant protection by Global NCAP 2.0 (based on Latin NCAP 2016) under its Safer Cars for India project. The rating was based on tests performed on both the Slavia and its twin, the Volkswagen Virtus. Despite being optional (now standard across all variants since July 2024), the Slavia and Virtus' side and curtain airbags met Global NCAP's requirements to be fitted during the side pole test. In all tests, protection of most body parts was deemed good or adequate, but there was moderate rearward intrusion of the pedals in the frontal offset test and a moderate risk of rib fracture in the side pole test.

Global NCAP 2.0 test results (India) Volkswagen Virtus / Škoda Slavia (2023, similar to Latin NCAP 2016)
Test	Score	Stars
Adult occupant protection	29.71/34.00	5 /5 stars
Child occupant protection	42.00/49.00	5 /5 stars

In April 2024, side and curtain airbags were made standard equipment on the Slavia.
