= Volkswagen Polo Mk6 =

Sixth generation of Volkswagen Polo

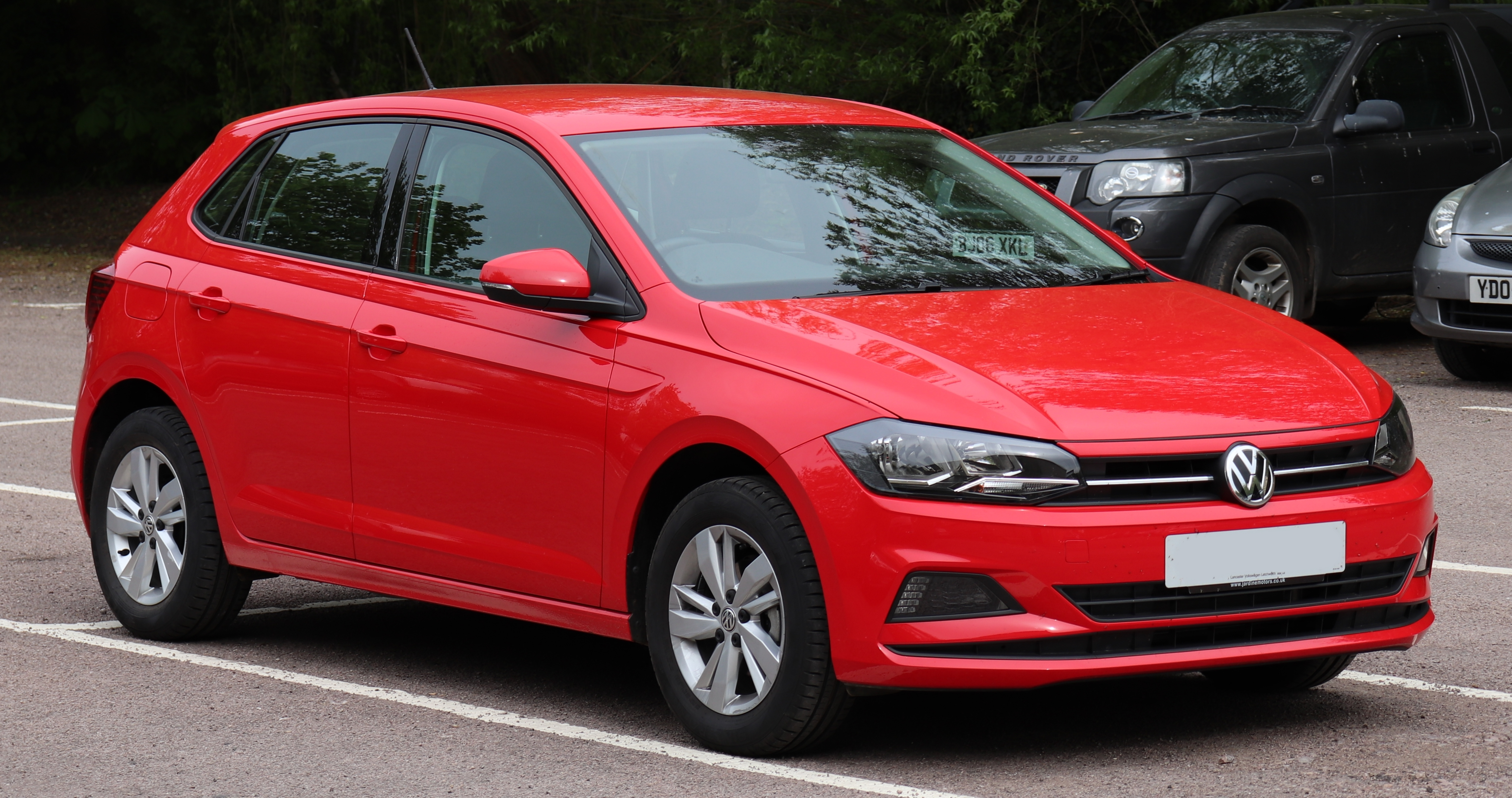
- Volkswagen Polo SE (pre-facelift)

Overview
- Manufacturer: Volkswagen
- Model code: AW1; BZ1; AE1
- Also called: Volkswagen Virtus (sedan)
- Production: July 2017– 2026
- Model years: 2018–2026
- Assembly: Spain: Pamplona (2017–2024); South Africa: Uitenhage/Kariega (Volkswagen South Africa); Brazil: São Bernardo do Campo (Volkswagen do Brasil) (2017–2023); Taubaté (2023–present); China: Anting, Shanghai (SAIC-VW) (2019–2026); Algeria: Relizane (SOVAC) (2017-2019)
- Designer: Klaus Bischoff, Marco Antonio Pavone and Einar Castillo Aranda

Body and chassis
- Body style: 5-door hatchback 4-door sedan (Virtus / Polo Sedan)
- Layout: Front-engine, front-wheel-drive
- Platform: Volkswagen Group MQB A0
- Related: Volkswagen Taigo/Nivus; Volkswagen T-Cross/Tacqua/Taigun; Volkswagen Tera; Volkswagen Tukan; Škoda Slavia; Škoda Fabia Mk4; Škoda Scala; Škoda Kamiq; Škoda Kylaq; SEAT Ibiza Mk5; SEAT Arona; Audi A1 Mk2

Powertrain
- Engine: Petrol: 1.0 L MPI I3; 1.0 L TSI I3; 1.4 L TSI I4; 1.5 L TSI I4; 1.6 L MSI I4; 2.0 L TSI I4 (GTI); Petrol/CNG: 1.0 L TGI I3; Diesel: 1.6 L TDI I4
- Transmission: 5-speed manual 6-speed manual 6-speed automatic 7-speed DSG

Dimensions
- Wheelbase: 2,548–2,564 mm (100.3–100.9 in)
- Length: 4,053–4,067 mm (159.6–160.1 in)
- Width: 1,751 mm (68.9 in)
- Height: 1,438–1,461 mm (56.6–57.5 in)
- Curb weight: 1,105–1,355 kg (2,436–2,987 lb)

Chronology
- Predecessor: Volkswagen Polo Mk5; Volkswagen Gol (Polo Track)

The Volkswagen Polo Mk6 is the sixth generation of the Polo, a supermini-class car manufactured by Volkswagen since 2017.

The sixth-generation Polo was first unveiled in Berlin on 16 June 2017, and launched in late 2017. Based on the Volkswagen Group MQB A0 platform, it is claimed to carry improvements in cabin space, engines, and interior technology. It is the first Polo generation that is not available with a 3-door body style as well as the first passenger vehicle sold under the Volkswagen brand to be based on a shortened version of the MQB platform.

The Mk6 Polo is 81 mm (3.2 in) longer, 63 mm (2.5 in) wider and 7 mm (0.3 in) lower than its predecessor. It has a wheelbase of 2,564 mm (100.9 in), which is 92 mm (3.6 in) longer than the previous model. The adoption of the MQB platform brought an increase in rigidity and stiffness over the previous generation, where the stiffness has increased from 14,000 Nm per degree to more than 18,000 Nm per degree according to Volkswagen.

Boot space has increased by about 25 percent from 280 to 351 L. Optionally, it now features the second-generation version of the 11.7-inch Active Info Digital Display Cockpit, a first in its class. As standard, the car comes with front collision detection, blind-spot assist, and emergency stopping. The car is said to be extremely customizable, available in 14 exterior colours and 17 dashboard colours.

Production for all right-hand drive markets are allocated to the Volkswagen plant in Uitenhage/Kariega, South Africa. The South African plant is also the sole producer of the Polo GTI.

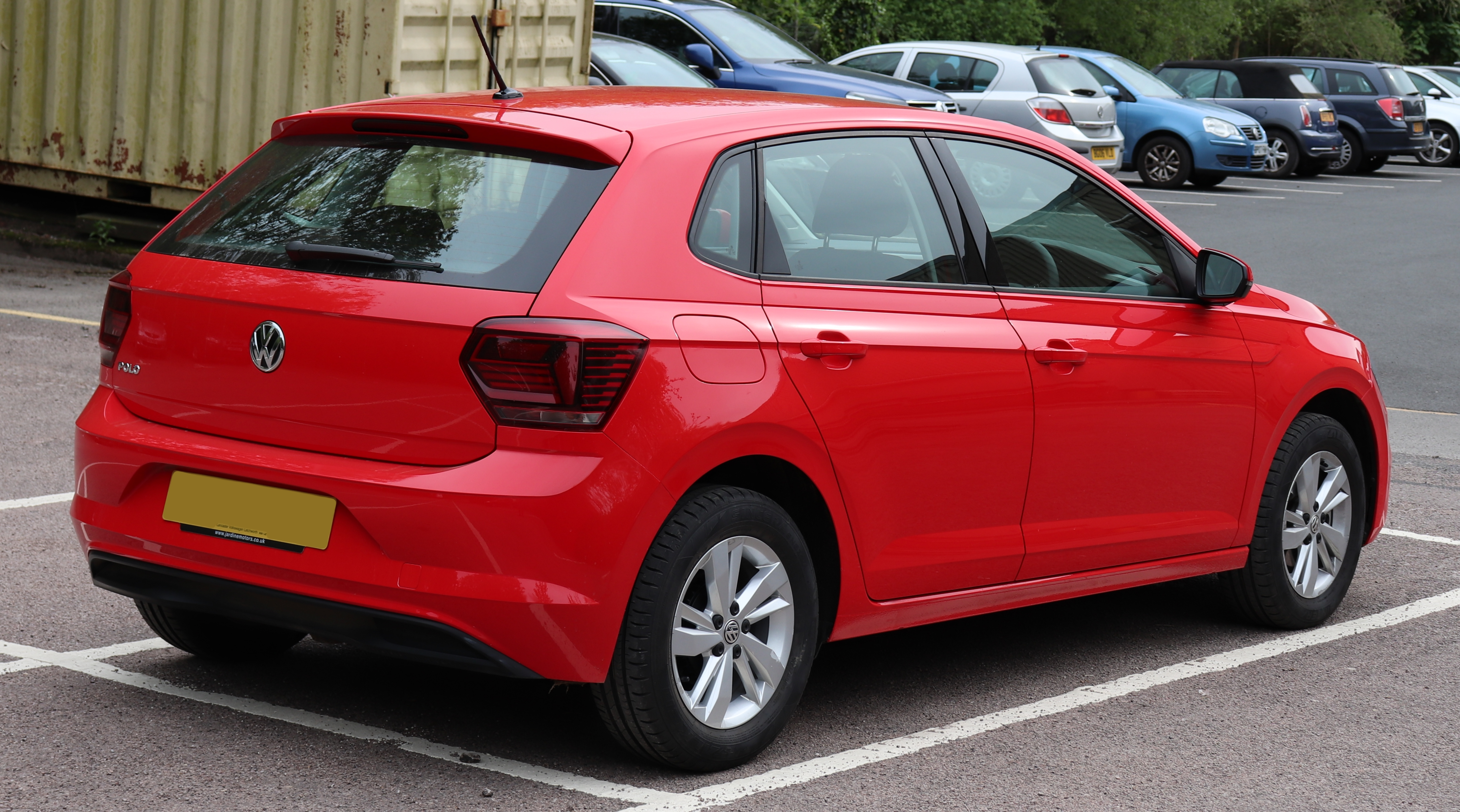
Rear view (pre-facelift)

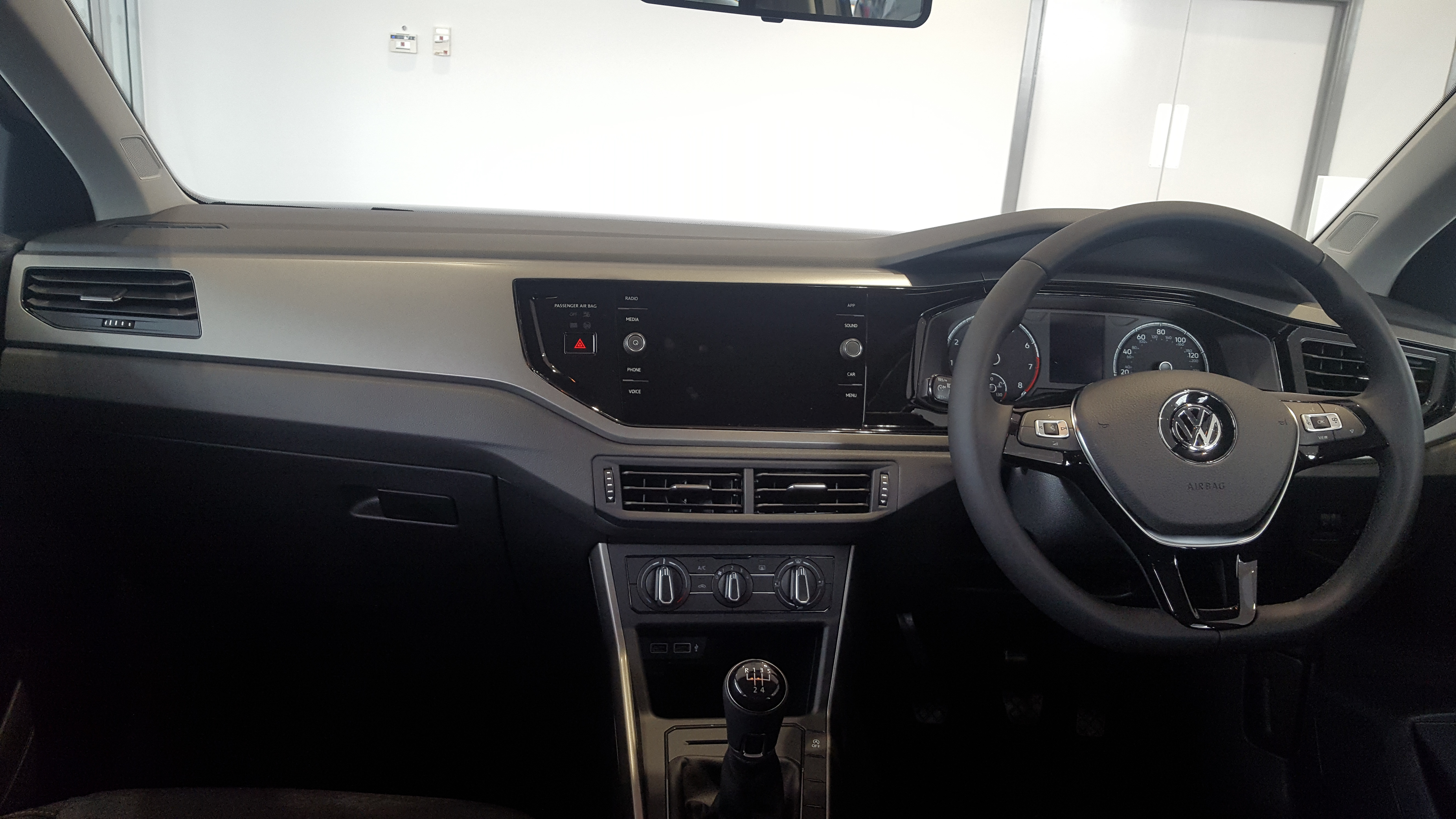
Interior

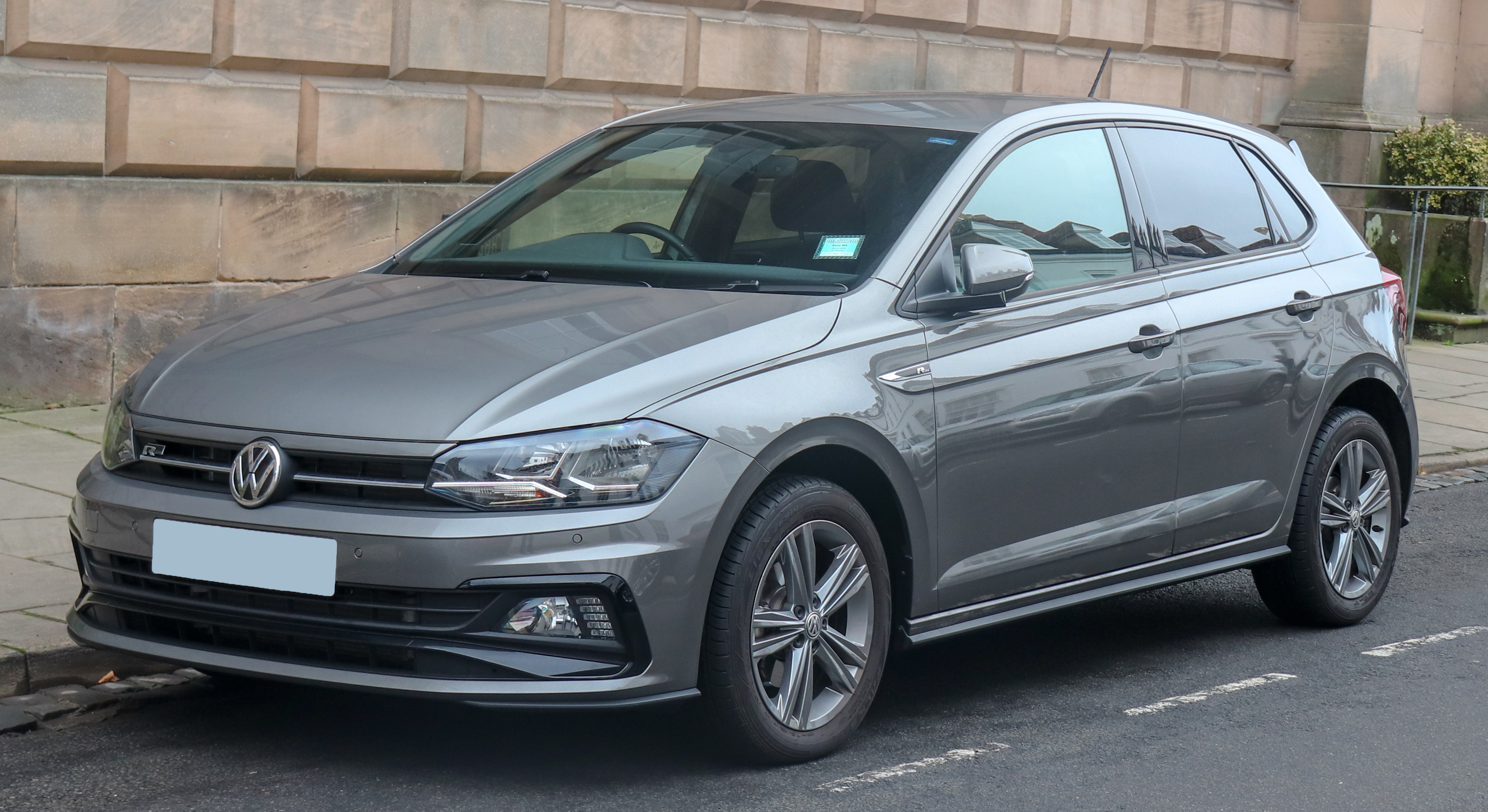
Polo R-Line (front)

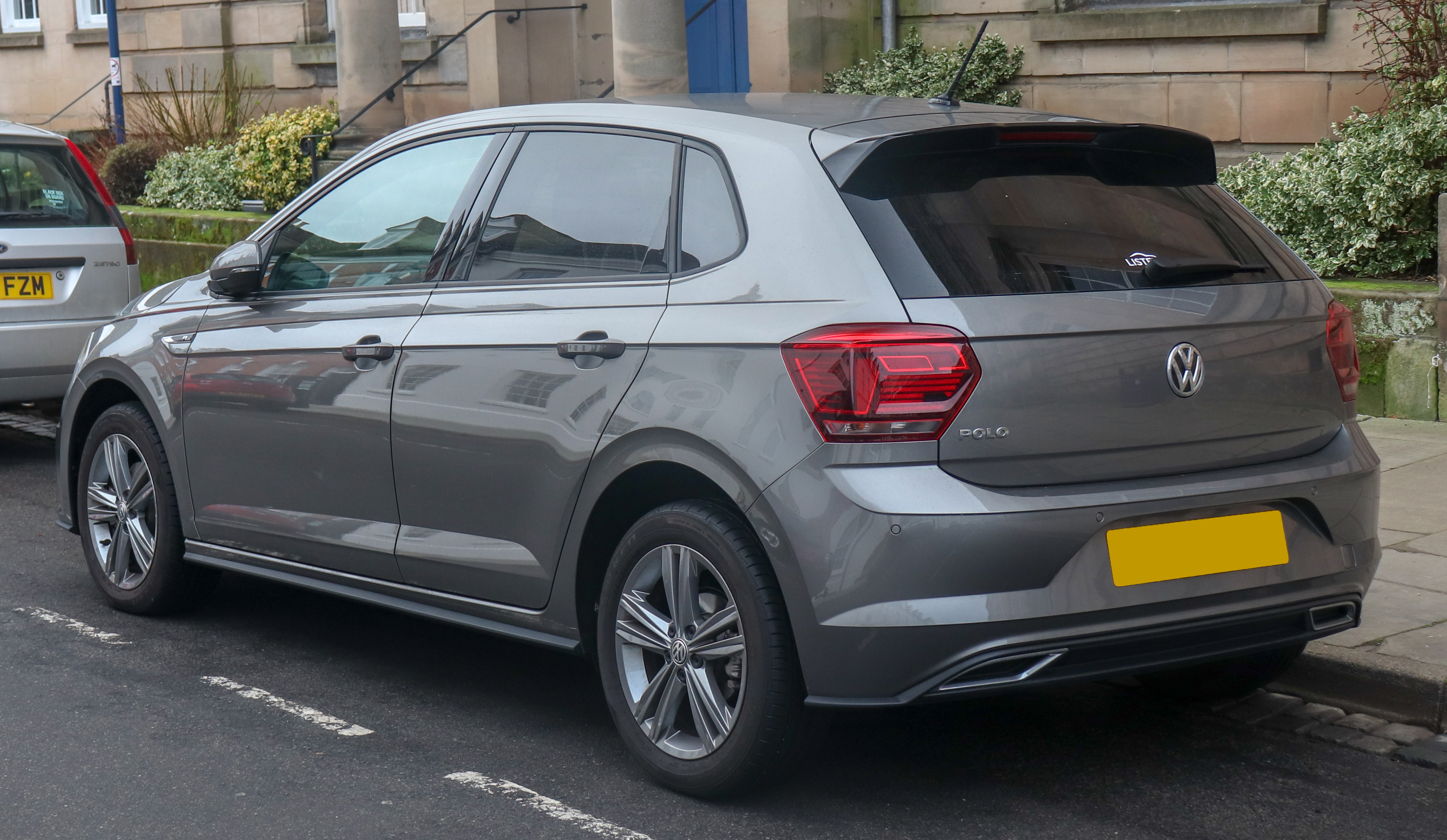
Polo R-Line (rear)

== Markets ==
=== Europe ===
In Europe, three trim levels were announced during its debut in 2017, which are Trendline, Comfortline and Highline, the ‘Beats’ special edition, and the performance-oriented Polo GTI. In UK the trim levels in 2017 were SE, SEL, R-Line, GTI and GTI+.

European models initially were available with a range of 1.0-litre, three-cylinder engines with various outputs; 1.0-litre 65 PS (64 hp; 48 kW) and 75 PS (74 hp; 55 kW) naturally aspirated versions, a natural gas-powered 1.0-litre TGI producing 89 PS (88 hp; 65 kW) - as well as 95 PS (94 hp; 70 kW) TSI. The 1.6-litre TDI engine was also available with 80 PS (79 hp; 59 kW) and 95 PS (94 hp; 70 kW) outputs. The GTI model gets a 200 PS (197 hp; 147 kW) 2.0-litre TSI engine.

=== Latin America ===
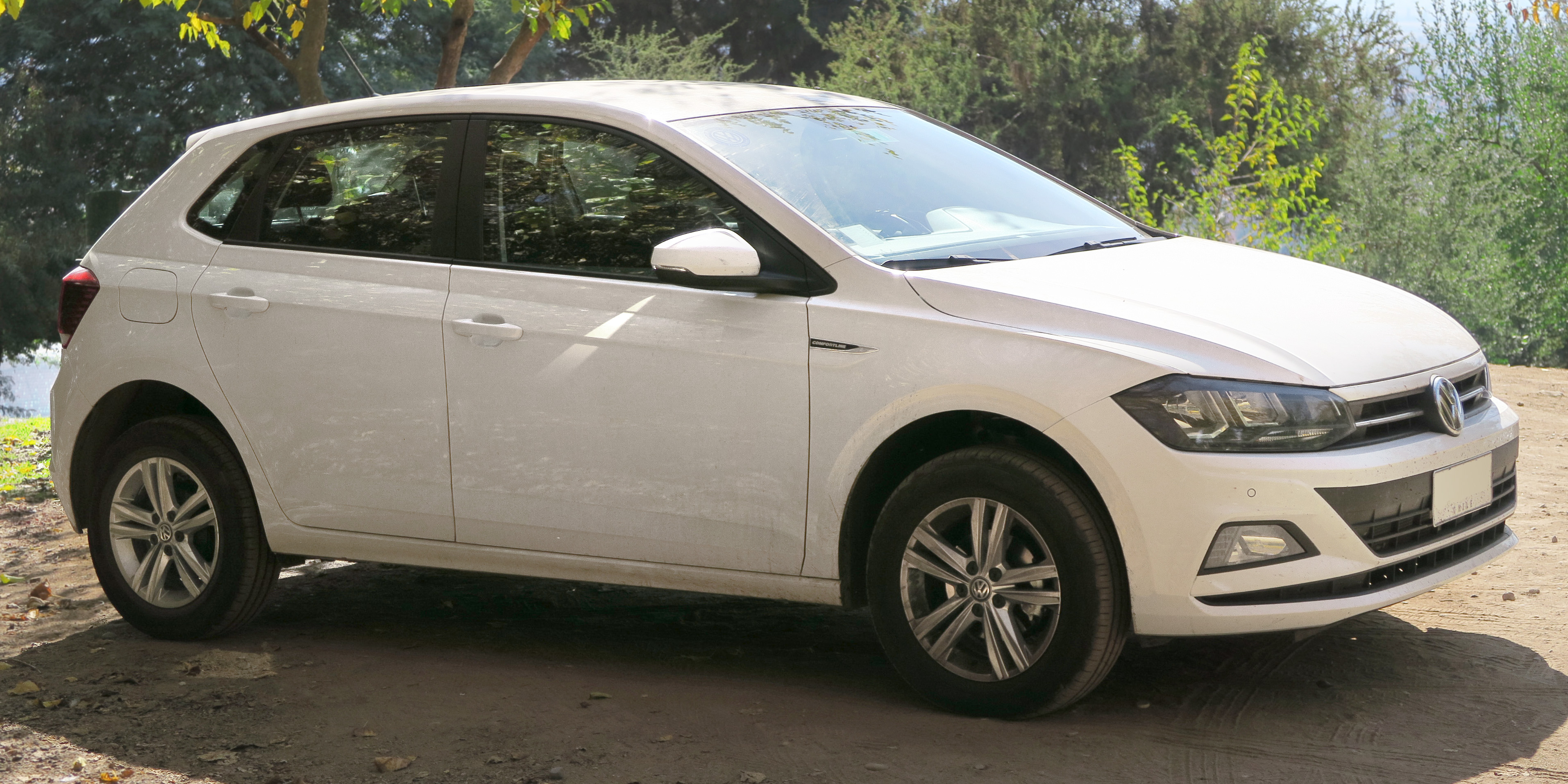
Volkswagen Polo 1.6 MSI Comfortline (Chile)

The Latin American-spec Polo debuted in Brazil in September 2017. At the time of its introduction, the Polo was positioned between the Fox and Golf in the Brazilian market, and marks the reintroduction of the nameplate in the country since the discontinuation of the fourth-generation Polo in 2015. Some changes were made compared to the European version, including a reworked suspension to provide higher ground clearance, a different headlight assembly and a revised front bumper design.

Engine options available are the basic 1.0-litre MPI petrol engine producing 85 PS (84 hp; 63 kW), 1.6-litre MSI rated at 119 PS (117 hp; 88 kW), and the top-spec 1.0-litre TSI with 130 PS (128 hp; 96 kW) marketed as '200 TSI', referencing its 200 N⋅m (20.4 kg⋅m; 148 lb⋅ft) maximum torque.

In early 2020, the GTS variant was launched in Brazil, featuring a 150 PS (148 hp; 110 kW) 1.4-litre turbocharged petrol engine and cosmetic additions.

In Mexico, the Brazilian-imported, facelifted Polo was released in 2023, six years after the Brazilian model's launch, sharing the same engines and specification with the Virtus saloon. It replaced the Indian-made Polo Mk5.

=== Polo Track ===
Announced in November 2022 as a replacement for the Gol, the Polo Track was released in February 2023 as a low-cost version of the Mk6 Polo. Aimed at fleet buyers, the Track version has a shorter list of features and a simpler exterior appearance. It is powered by a 1.0-litre MPI (1.6-litre 16V MSI 105 hp for Colombia and other countries) petrol flex engine producing 85 PS (84 hp; 63 kW).

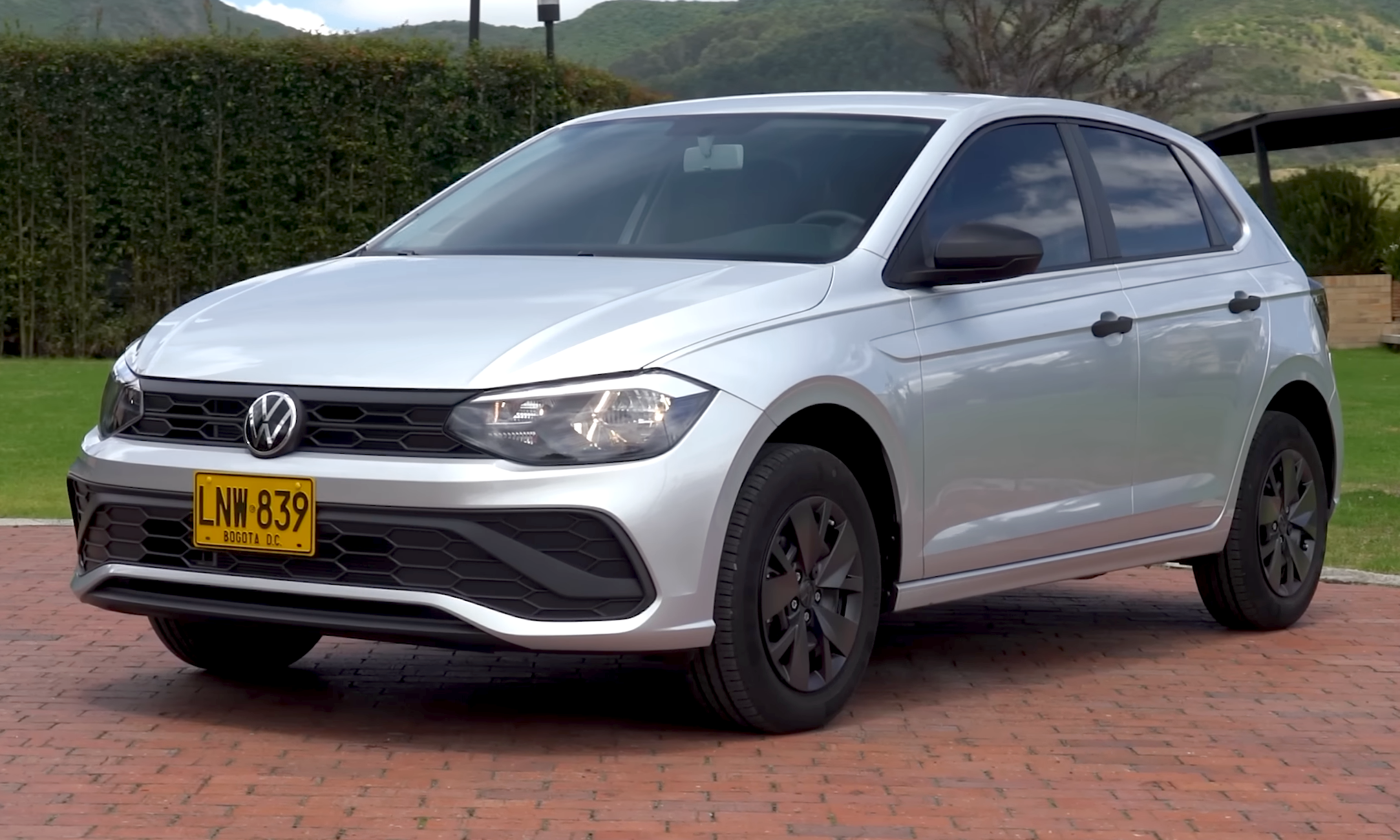
Polo Track (front)

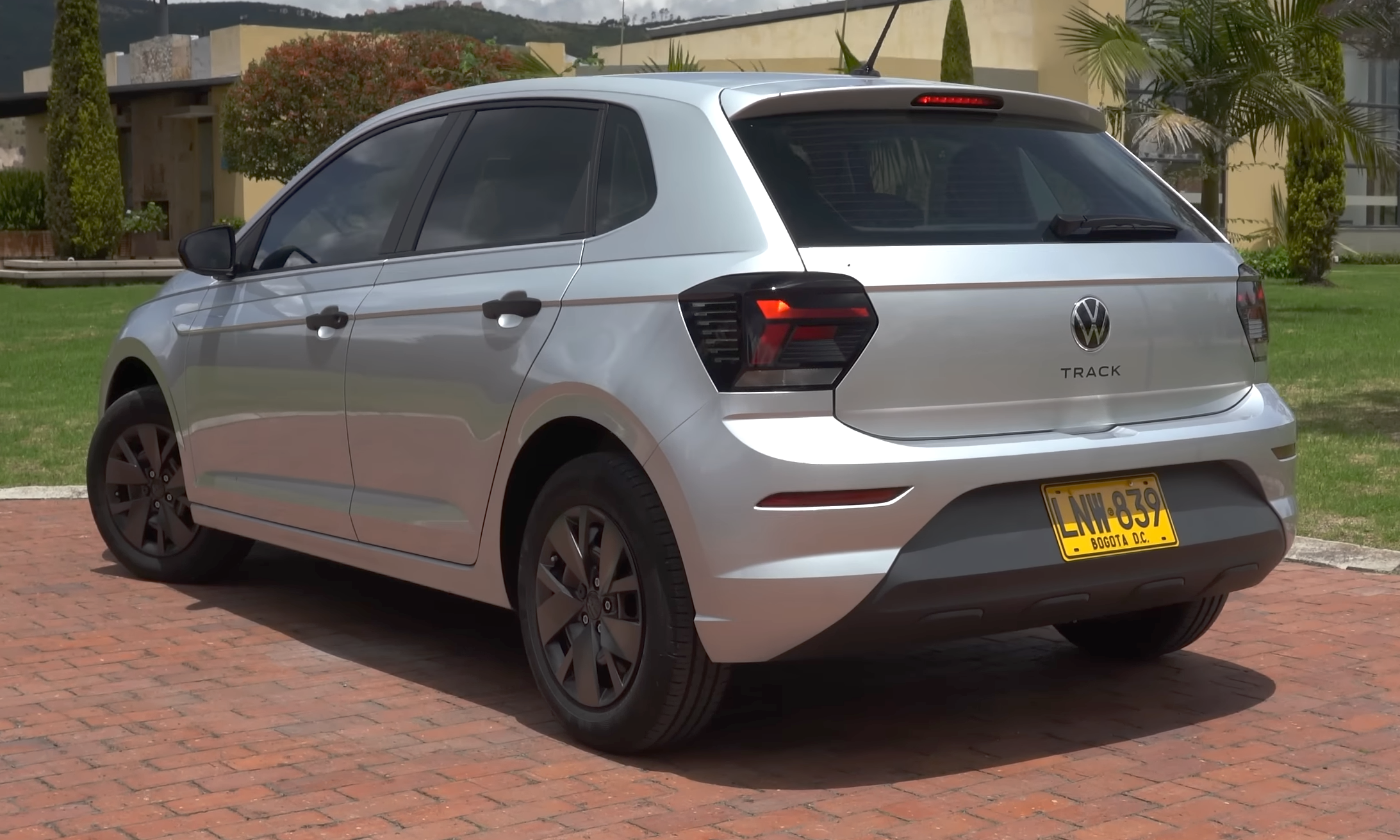
Polo Track (rear)

== Facelift ==
In April 2021, the restyled version of the sixth-generation Polo was revealed for the European market, known colloquially as the MK7. It gained a redesigned front end, featuring reshaped headlights and an LED light bar on the grille. A matrix LED setup is optional for the first time in a Polo. The rear end now adopts wider LED taillights extending onto the tailgate. With the facelifted version, the Polo comes with a fully digital instrument cluster as standard. The dashboard also received a redesigned touch climate control.

For the Latin American market, the facelifted 2023 Polo does not receive the taillight shape redesign.

For the Australian market, the Volkswagen Polo GTI which had been a staple hot hatch since its launch in October 2005, was discontinued in May 2026 after a 21 year run. 2026 will be the final model year due to Volkswagen's focus on the brand's ID.series. At the launch of the Volkswagen ID. Polo GTI in Europe at the same time for the 2027 model year, it is currently unconfirmed whether the model will see a launch in Australia as the Polo GTI's successor.

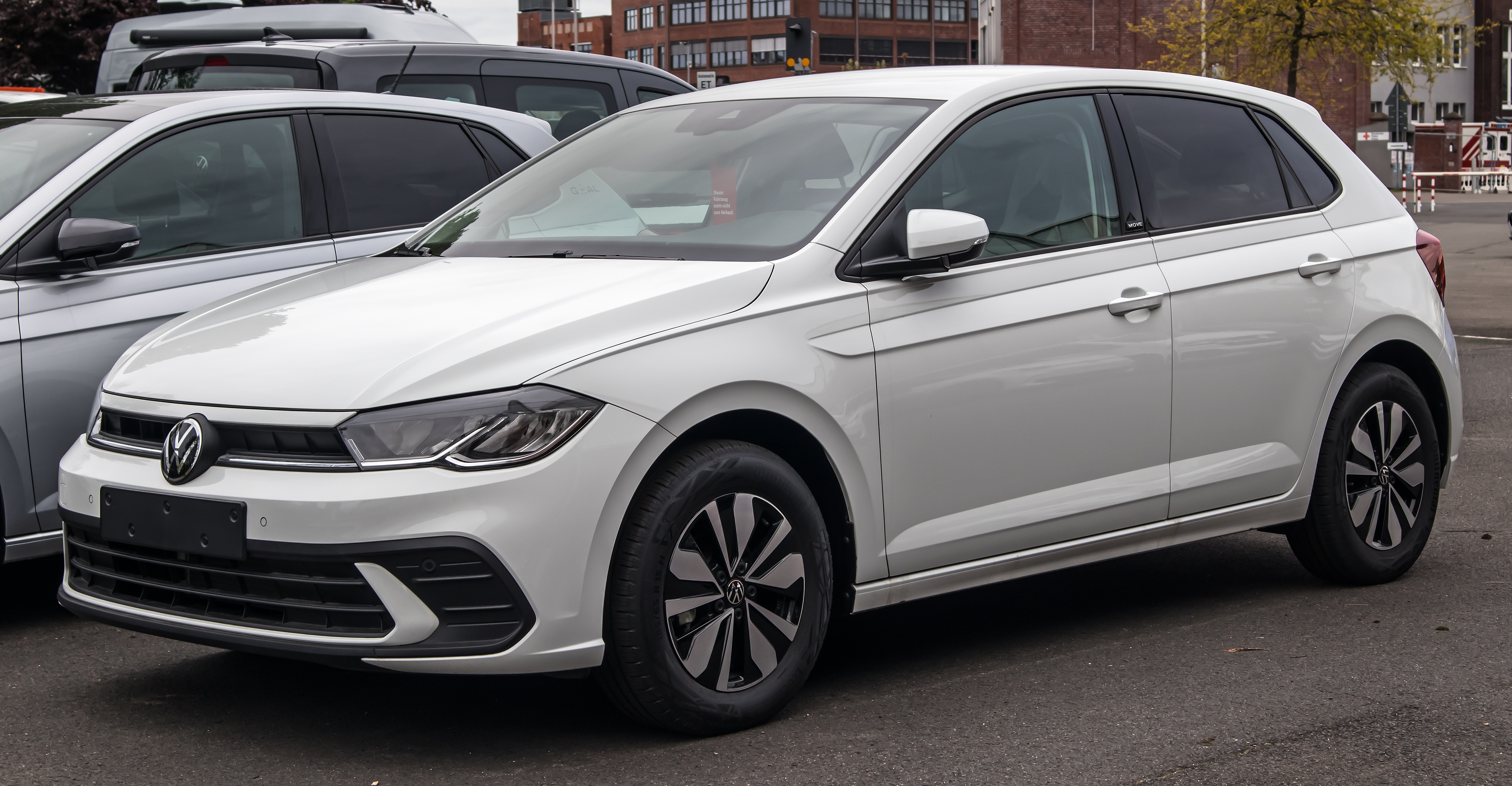
2021 Polo (facelift)

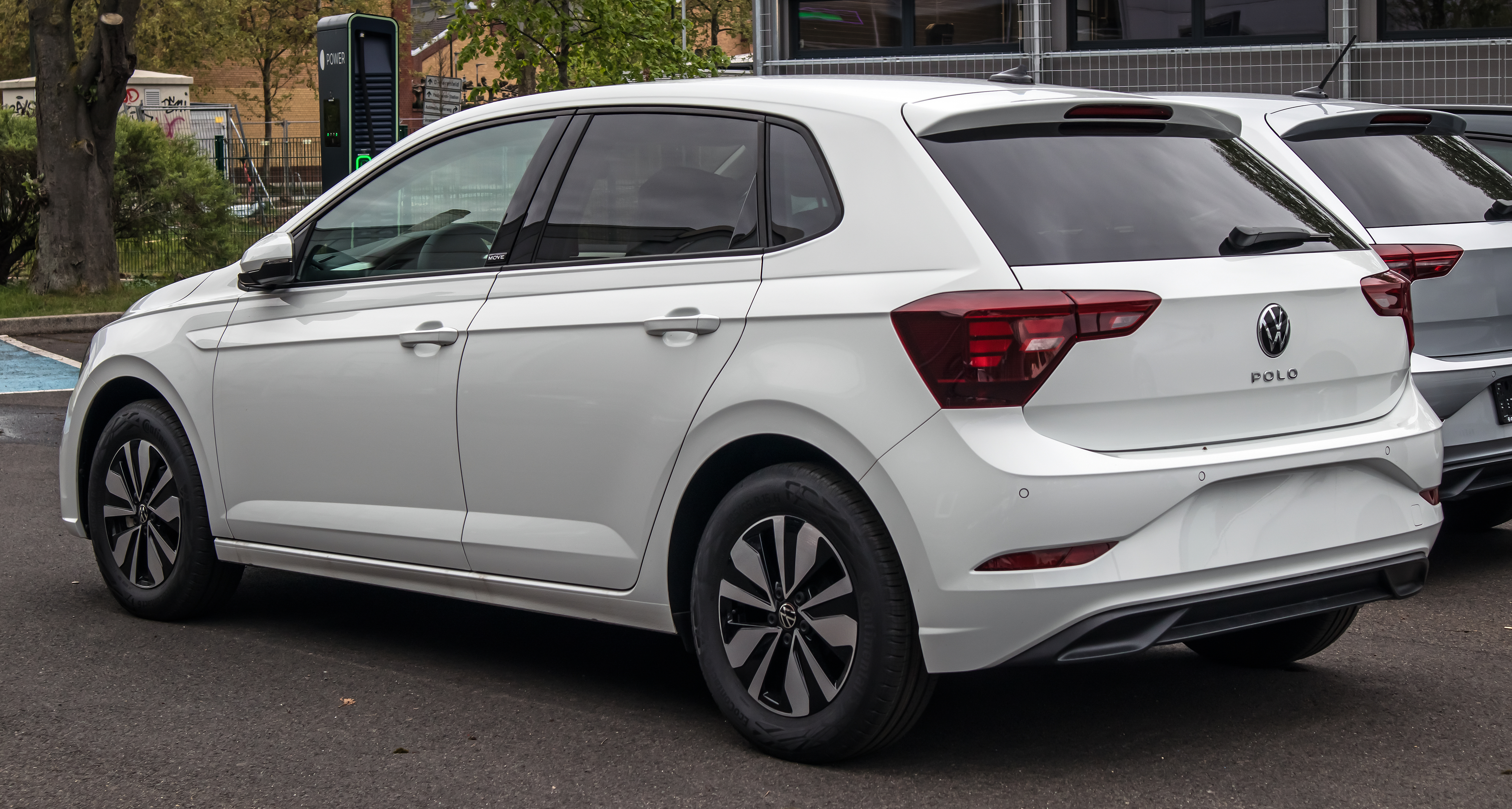
2021 Polo (facelift)

== Virtus ==
Volkswagen developed the sixth-generation Polo in a saloon body style badged as the Volkswagen Virtus, which is produced in Brazil and exported to most Latin American countries. It is also produced in India since 2022. It is marketed as the Polo Sedan in South Africa since September 2022.

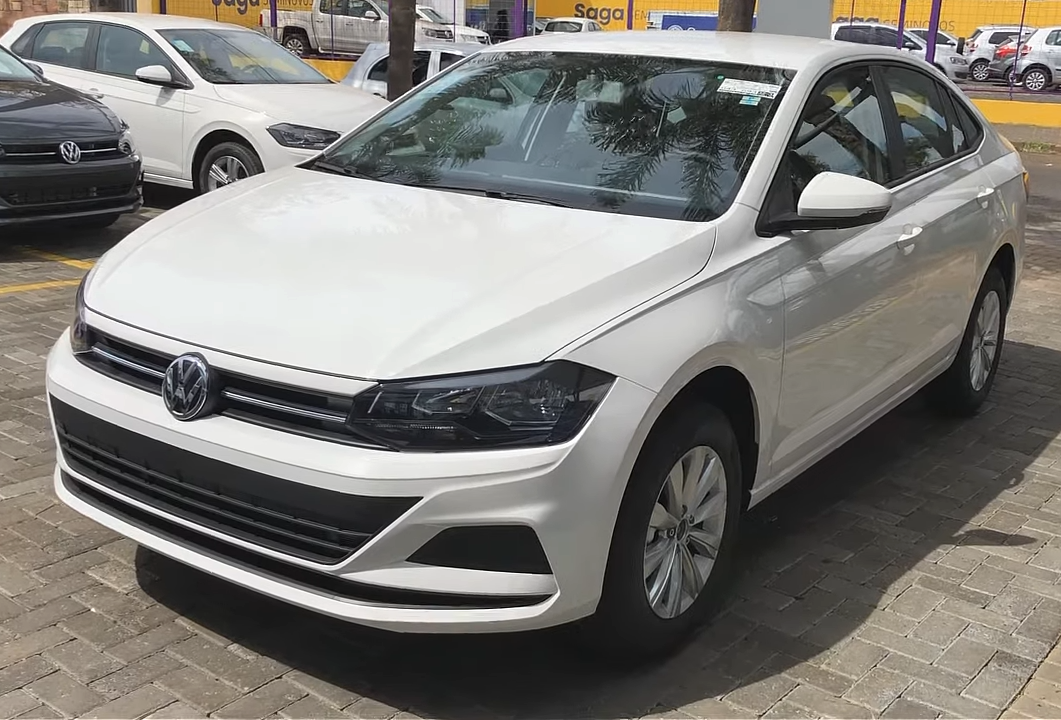
Volkswagen Virtus (Brazil)

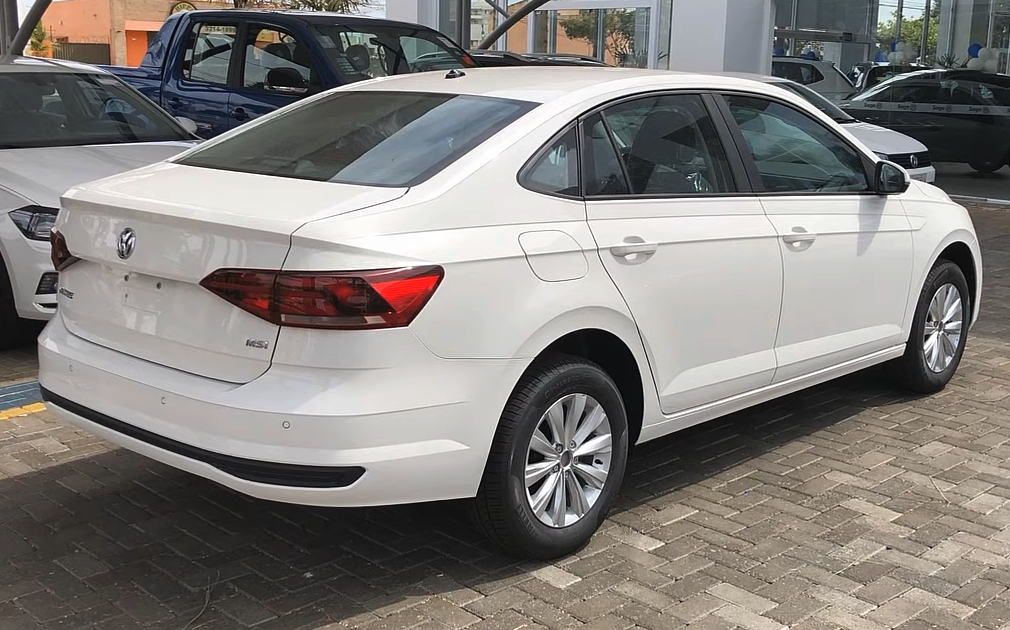
Rear view

== Other Versions ==
=== Polo liftback (Russia) ===
In Russia and the neighbouring CIS countries, a separate Polo model was released in 2020 to replace the Polo Mk5 saloon. Unrelated to the Mk6 Polo, the model heavily based on the global Škoda Rapid liftback to cut costs instead of having to produce the MQB A0-based Volkswagen Virtus. The Russian-market Polo features a Jetta-like front fascia, and a unique rear fascia to differentiate it from the Rapid, while sharing the front bumper and hood panel with the Jetta VA3. As it is based on the Rapid, it is based the A05+ (PQ25) platform and has a liftback tailgate instead of a conventional saloon trunk opening.

It is offered with a 1.6-litre MPI four-cylinder, naturally aspirated engine with 89 hp (90 PS; 66 kW) with a five-speed automatic gearbox, and 109 hp (111 PS; 81 kW) also with a six-speed automatic transmission, and a 1.4-litre TSI four-cylinder with 123 hp (125 PS; 92 kW), only with a seven-speed DSG dual-clutch transmission.

In early 2022, Volkswagen ceased production and new car sales of the global Skoda Rapid liftback-based CIS Volkswagen Polo, due to international sanctions being imposed on Russia as a result of the 2022 Russian invasion of Ukraine.

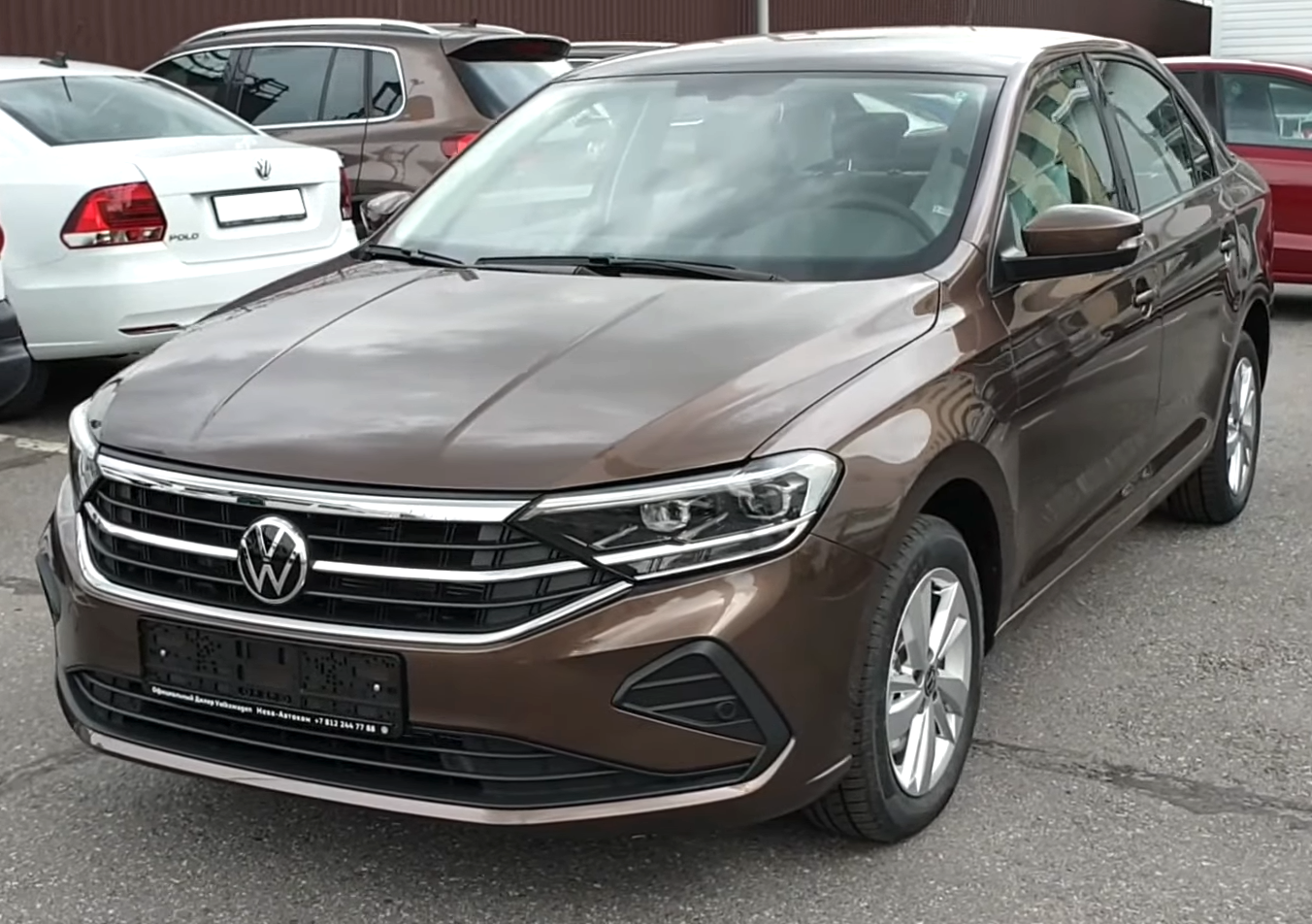
Volkswagen Polo (Russian version, front view)

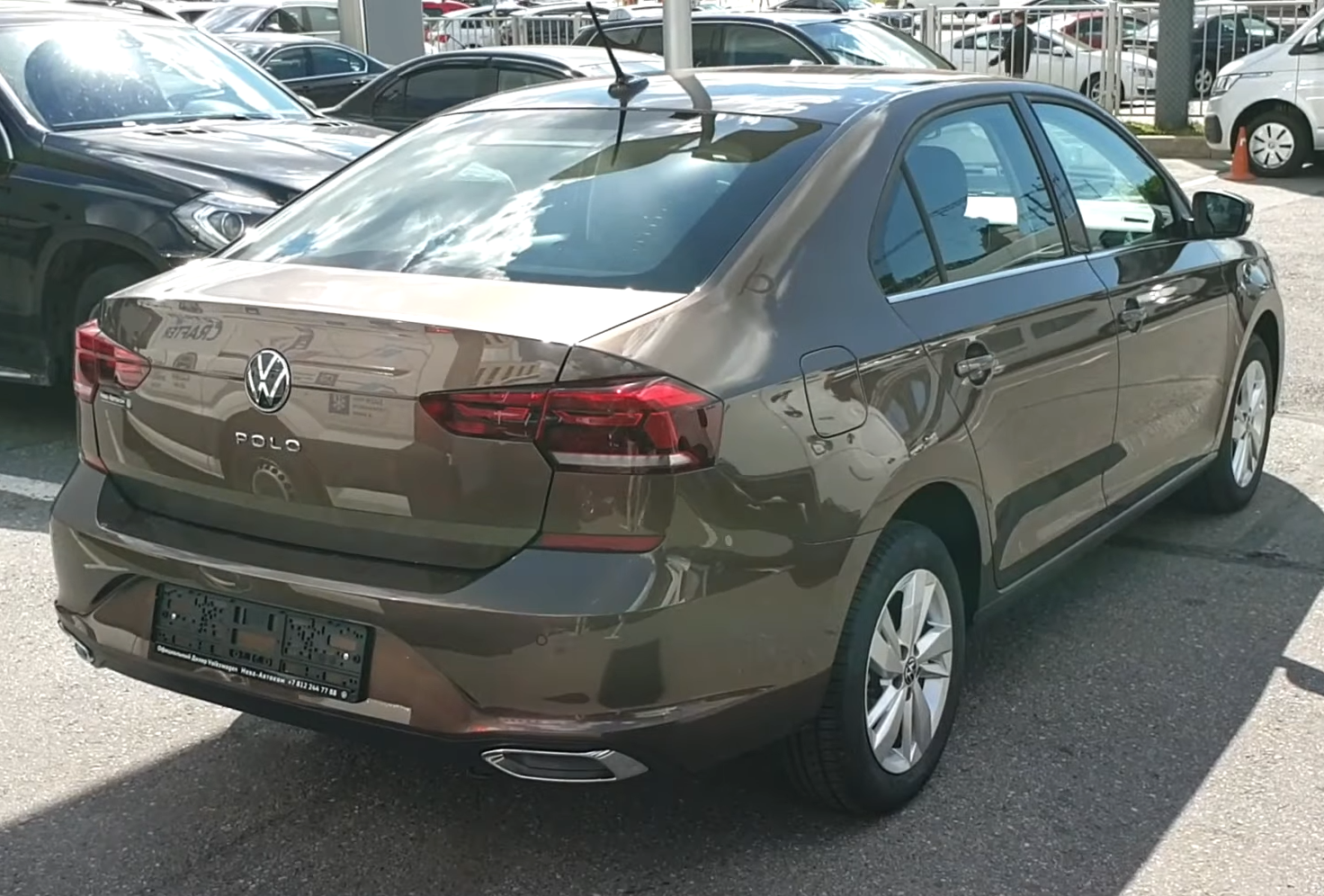
Volkswagen Polo (Russian version, rear view)

== Powertrain ==
=== Pre-Facelift ===
Petrol Engines
Model	Engine	Year	Power	Torque	Top Speed	Acceleration 0–100 km/h (0–62 mph)	Transmission	CO2 Emissions	Fuel Consumption (combined)
1.0	999 cc (61.0 cu in) Inline-3	2017 - 2019	65 PS (48 kW; 64 hp) at 5,000 rpm	95 N⋅m (70 lb⋅ft) at 3,000 rpm	164 km/h (105 mph)	15.5 s	5-spd Manual	108 g/km	4.7 L/100 km (NEDC)
1.0	999 cc (61.0 cu in) Inline-3	2017-2018	75 PS (55 kW; 74 hp) at 6,200 rpm	95 N⋅m (70 lb⋅ft) at 3,000 rpm	170 km/h (106 mph)	14.9 s	5-spd Manual	108 g/km	4.7 L/100 km (NEDC)
1.0	999 cc (61.0 cu in) Inline-3	2019 - 2021	80 PS (59 kW; 79 hp) at 6,200 rpm	95 N⋅m (70 lb⋅ft) at 3,000 rpm	170 km/h (106 mph)	14.9 s	5-spd Manual	110 g/km	4.8 L/100 km (NEDC)
1.0 TSI	999 cc (61.0 cu in) Turbo Inline-3	2017 - 2020	95 PS (70 kW; 94 hp) at 5,000 rpm	175 N⋅m (129 lb⋅ft) at 2,000 rpm	187 km/h (116 mph)	10.8 s	5-spd Manual	101 g/km	4.4 L/100 km (NEDC)
1.0 TSI	999 cc (61.0 cu in) Turbo Inline-3	2021 - 2021	95 PS (70 kW; 94 hp) at 5,000 rpm	175 N⋅m (129 lb⋅ft) at 2,000 rpm	187 km/h (116 mph)	10.8 s	5-spd Manual	99 g/km 126 g/km (WLTP)	4.4 L/100 km (NEDC) 5.6 L/100 km (WLTP)
1.0 TSI	999 cc (61.0 cu in) Turbo Inline-3	2017-2021	95 PS (70 kW; 94 hp) at 5,000 rpm	175 N⋅m (129 lb⋅ft) at 2,000 rpm	187 km/h (116 mph)	10.8 s	7-spd DSG	105 g/km 138 g/km (WLTP)	4.6 L/100 km (NEDC) 6.1 L/100 km (WLTP)
1.0 TSI	999 cc (61.0 cu in) Turbo Inline-3	2017 - 2021	116 PS (85 kW; 114 hp) at 5,000 rpm	200 N⋅m (147 lb⋅ft) at 2,000 rpm	200 km/h (124 mph)	9.5 s	6-spd Manual	105 g/km	4.6 L/100 km (NEDC)
1.0 TSI	999 cc (61.0 cu in) Turbo Inline-3	2017 - 2021	116 PS (85 kW; 114 hp) at 5,000 rpm	200 N⋅m (147 lb⋅ft) at 2,000 rpm	200 km/h (124 mph)	9.5 s	7-spd DSG	109 g/km	4.8 L/100 km (NEDC)
1.5 TSI	1498 cc (91.4 cu in) Turbo Inline-4	2019 - 2021	150 PS (110 kW; 148 hp) at – rpm	250 N⋅m (184 lb⋅ft) at 1,500 rpm	216 km/h (134 mph)	8.2 s	7-spd DSG	116 g/km	5.1 L/100 km (NEDC)
2.0 TSI GTI	1984 cc (121.1 cu in) Turbo Inline-4	2017 - 2020	200 PS (147 kW; 197 hp) at 4,700 rpm	320 N⋅m (236 lb⋅ft) at 1,500 rpm	237 km/h (147 mph)	6.7 s	6-spd Manual	134 g/km	5.9 L/100 km (NEDC)
2.0 TSI GTI	1984 cc (121.1 cu in) Turbo Inline-4	2017 - 2020	200 PS (147 kW; 197 hp) at 4,700 rpm	320 N⋅m (236 lb⋅ft) at 1,500 rpm	237 km/h (147 mph)	6.7 s	7-spd DSG	134 g/km	5.9 L/100 km (NEDC)

Diesel
Model	Engine	Year	Power	Torque	Top Speed	Acceleration 0–100 km/h (0–62 mph)	Transmission	CO2 Emissions	Fuel Consumption (combined)
1.6 TDI	1598 cc (97.5 cu in) Turbo Inline-4	2017 -	95 PS (70 kW; 94 hp) at 3,250 rpm	250 N⋅m (184 lb⋅ft) at 1,500 rpm	185 km/h (115 mph)	11.2 s	5-spd Manual	97 g/km	3.7 L/100 km (NEDC)
1.6 TDI	1598 cc (97.5 cu in) Turbo Inline-4	2017 -	95 PS (70 kW; 94 hp) at 3,250 rpm	250 N⋅m (184 lb⋅ft) at 1,500 rpm	185 km/h (115 mph)	11.2 s	7-spd DSG	97 g/km	3.7 L/100 km (NEDC)

CNG
Model	Engine	Year	Power	Torque	Top Speed	Acceleration 0–100 km/h (0–62 mph)	Transmission	CO2 Emissions	Fuel Consumption (combined)
1.0 TGI	999 cc (61.0 cu in) Turbo Inline-3	2017 - 2021	90 PS (66 kW; 89 hp) at 5,000 rpm	160 N⋅m (118 lb⋅ft) at 1,800 rpm	183 km/h (114 mph)	11.9 s	5-spd Manual	85 g/km	3.1 L/100 km (NEDC)

=== Facelift ===
Petrol
Model	Engine	Year	Power	Torque	Top Speed	Acceleration 0–100 km/h (0–62 mph)	Transmission	CO2 Emissions	Fuel Consumption (combined)
1.0	999 cc (61.0 cu in) Inline-3	2021 -	80 PS (59 kW; 79 hp) at 6,200 rpm	93 N⋅m (68 lb⋅ft) at 3,700 rpm	171 km/h (106 mph)	15.5 s	5-spd Manual	105 g/km 123 g/km (WLTP)	4.6 L/100 km (NEDC) 5.4 L/100 km (WLTP)
1.0 TSI	999 cc (61.0 cu in) Turbo Inline-3	2021 -	95 PS (70 kW; 94 hp) at 5,000 rpm	175 N⋅m (129 lb⋅ft) at 1,600 rpm	187 km/h (116 mph)	10.8 s	5-spd Manual	106 g/km 118 g/km (WLTP)	4.6 L/100 km (NEDC) 5.2 L/100 km (WLTP)
1.0 TSI	999 cc (61.0 cu in) Turbo Inline-3	2021 -	95 PS (70 kW; 94 hp) at 5,000 rpm	175 N⋅m (129 lb⋅ft) at 1,600 rpm	187 km/h (116 mph)	10.8 s	7-spd DSG	105 g/km 125 g/km (WLTP)	4.6 L/100 km (NEDC) 5.5 L/100 km (WLTP)
1.0 TSI	999 cc (61.0 cu in) Turbo Inline-3	2021 -	110 PS (81 kW; 109 hp) at – rpm	200 N⋅m (147 lb⋅ft) at 2,000 rpm	195 km/h (121 mph)	10.4 s	7-spd DSG	107 g/km 125 g/km (WLTP)	4.7 L/100 km (NEDC) 5.5 L/100 km (WLTP)
2.0 TSI GTI	1984 cc (121.1 cu in) Turbo Inline-4	2022 - 2024	207 PS (152 kW; 204 hp) at 4,500 rpm	320 N⋅m (236 lb⋅ft) at 1,500 rpm	240 km/h (149 mph)	6.5 s	7-spd DSG	128 g/km 154 g/km (WLTP)	5.6 L/100 km (NEDC) 6.8 L/100 km (WLTP)
2.0 TSI GTI	1984 cc (121.1 cu in) Turbo Inline-4	2025 - 2026	207 PS (152 kW; 204 hp) at 4,600 rpm	320 N⋅m (236 lb⋅ft) at 1,500 rpm	240 km/h (149 mph)	6.5 s	7-spd DSG	148 g/km (WLTP)	6.5 L/100 km (WLTP)

== Safety ==
=== ANCAP ===
ANCAP test results* Volkswagen Polo all variants (2017, aligned with Euro NCAP)
Test	Points	%
Overall:	5 /5 stars	
Adult occupant:	36.7	96%
Child occupant:	41.9	85%
Pedestrian:	31.9	76%
Safety assist:	7.1	59%

ANCAP test results* Volkswagen Polo New Zealand variants (2017, aligned with Euro NCAP)
Test	Points	%
Overall:	5 /5 stars	
Adult occupant:	36.7	96%
Child occupant:	41.9	85%
Pedestrian:	31.9	76%
Safety assist:	7.1	59%

ANCAP test results Volkswagen Polo all Australian variants (2022, aligned with Euro NCAP)
Test	Points	%
Overall:	5 /5 stars	
Adult occupant:	35.88	94%
Child occupant:	39.50	89%
Pedestrian:	37.97	70%
Safety assist:	11.36	70%

=== Euro NCAP ===
Euro NCAP test results* Volkswagen Polo 1.0 TSI Comfortline (LHD) (2017)
Test	Points	%
Overall:	5 /5 stars	
Adult occupant:	36.7	96%
Child occupant:	42	85%
Pedestrian:	32	76%
Safety assist:	7.2	59%

=== Latin NCAP ===
The Polo in its most basic version for Latin America received 5 stars for adult occupants, 5 stars for toddlers, and Advanced Award from Latin NCAP 2.0 in 2017.

2017 Volkswagen Polo Mk6
Latin NCAP 2.0 scores (2017)
Adult protection stars	5/5 stars
Child protection stars	5/5 stars

The facelifted Polo was reassessed by Latin NCAP 3.0 in 2022 and achieved a three-star safety rating (similar to Euro NCAP 2014). Latin NCAP noted that since the original test, the car had lost a manual passenger airbag disconnection switch that allows for safe installation of a rearward-facing child restraint on the front passenger seat.

Latin NCAP 3.0 test results 2022 Volkswagen Polo Mk6 (2022, similar to Euro NCAP 2014)
Test	Points	%
Overall:	3 /5 stars	
Adult occupant:		73%
Child occupant:		71%
Pedestrian:		51%
Safety assist:		58%

== See also ==
- Volkswagen Polo for an overview of all models
- Volkswagen Polo Mk1
- Volkswagen Polo Mk2
- Volkswagen Polo Mk3
- Volkswagen Polo Mk4
- Volkswagen Polo Mk5

Preceded by Volkswagen Polo Mk5	Volkswagen Polo Mk6; 2017–present	Succeeded by
