= Zhenzhou, Jiangsu =

Town in Yizheng, Jiangsu, China

Zhenzhou 真州镇
- Town
- Location in Jiangsu
- Coordinates: 32.2675°N 119.1776°E
- Country: People's Republic of China
- Province: Jiangsu
- Prefecture-level city: Yangzhou
- County-level city: Yizheng
- Time zone: UTC+8 (China Standard)

Zhenzhou (真州镇) is a town in Yizheng, Jiangsu, China.

== Administrative divisions ==
Zhenzhou has the following administrative subdivisions:

- Chengbei Community (城北社区)
- Hongye Community (红叶社区)
- Gulou Community (鼓楼社区)
- Dashi Community (大市社区)
- Tianning Community (天宁社区)
- Qinfeng Community (勤丰社区)
- Yangguang Community (阳光社区)
- Zitong Community (梓潼社区)
- Dongyuan Community (东园社区)
- Hongqiao Community (弘桥社区)
- Kuilou Community (奎楼社区)
- Chengnan Community (城南社区)
- Wanbo Community (万博社区)
- Jiahe Community (嘉禾社区)
- Yanhe Community (沿河社区)
- Dongshan Community (东山社区)
- Puxi Community (浦西社区)
- Pudong Community (浦东社区)
- Baisha Community (白沙社区)
- Yingjiang Community (迎江社区)
- Huaxingxin Village (华兴新村)
- Wuyi Village (五一村)
- Chapeng Village (茶蓬村)
- Yongqing Village (永庆村)
- Sanba Village (三八村)
- Wannian Village (万年村)
- Xianjin Village (先进村)
- Zuo'an Village (佐安村)
- Changjiang Village (长江村)
