= Yizheng =

Yizheng 仪征市 Icheng
- County-level city
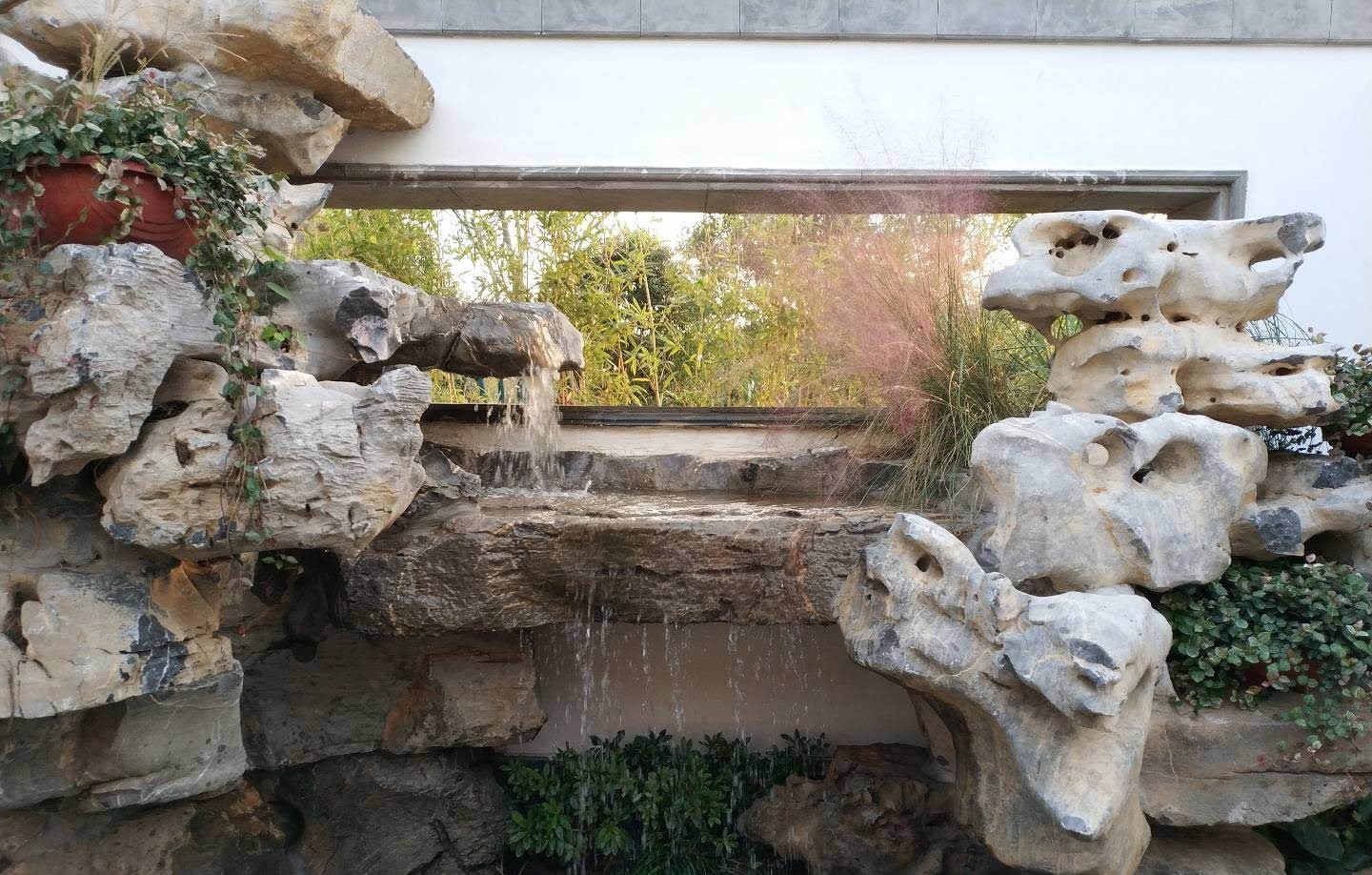
- Yizheng Expo Garden

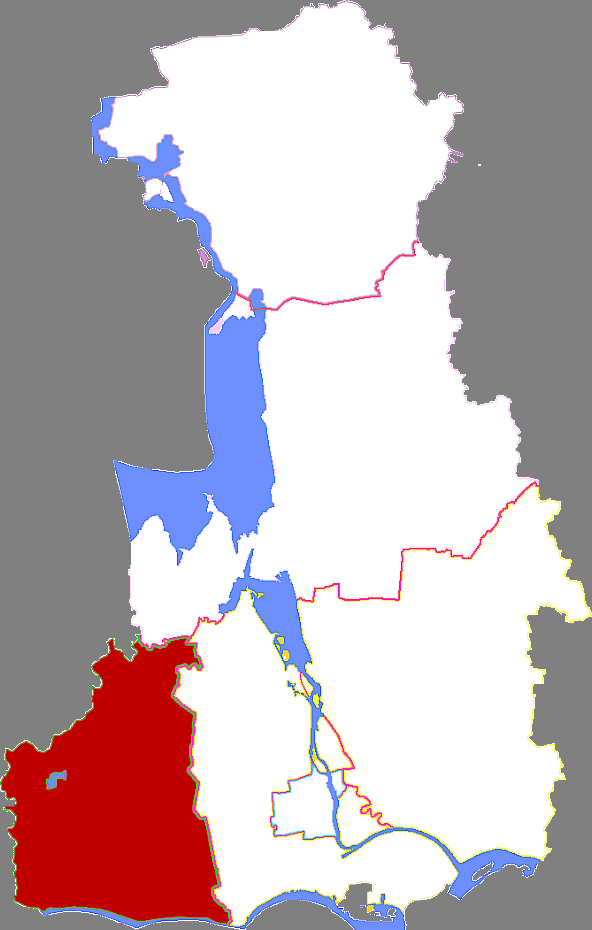

- Location in Jiangsu
- Coordinates: 32°16′20″N 119°11′05″E
- Country: People's Republic of China
- Province: Jiangsu
- Prefecture-level city: Yangzhou

Area
  - Total: 857 km^{2} (331 sq mi)

Population (2018)
  - Total: 560,258
  - Density: 654/km^{2} (1,690/sq mi)
- Time zone: UTC+8 (China Standard)
- Postal code: 211400

Yizheng (simplified Chinese: 仪征; traditional Chinese: 儀徵; pinyin: Yízhēng) is a county-level city under the administration of the prefecture-level city of Yangzhou, Jiangsu province, China, with a population of about 600,000 (2007). It borders the prefecture-level divisions of Chuzhou (Anhui) to the north, Nanjing to the west, and Zhenjiang to the south.

== History ==
=== Early history ===
In the western part of Yizheng, the Poshankou (破山口) tomb dates to the Zhou period; its excavations yielded not only ritual bronzes likely originating from the Central Plains but also a bronze sickle—one of the earliest specimens discovered in China. The site is situated atop the Shu Ridge (Shugang, 蜀冈), a high terrace of firm yellow soil that runs through Yizheng.

During the late Han dynasty, as silt built up along the riverbank south of the ridge, the entrance to the Jiangdu Canal became blocked by the mid-4th century. Because of this, the mouth of the canal was moved to Ouyang Dam (Ouyangdai), about five kilometers to the northeast. Throughout the Six Dynasties, this location served as the gateway to Guangling. The canal connecting Ouyang Dam to Guangling was the precursor to the modern Yi-Yang Canal.

During the medieval period, the site of the present-day city proper was originally an island in the Yangtze known as Baisha (White Sand, 白沙) Shoal. By the Sui and Tang dynasties, the shoal had grown in proximity to the northern bank, though it remained distinct.

Originally established as Baisha Town within Yongzhen (Yangzi) County, the settlement was renamed Yingluan in 922 and subsequently elevated to the status of the Jian'an Army (建安) in 962. In 985, Yongzhen County was incorporated into Jian'an Army, followed by the annexation of Luhe County in 996—though the original county seat at Yangzi Town was transferred to Jiangdu.

=== Song through Yuan ===
During the Northern Song, the region emerged as a major administrative and commercial center; it assumed much of the role previously held by Yangzhou in managing the state tea and salt monopolies. The Song had established a Monopoly Tax Commission (榷貨務) at Jian'an, serving as an exchange agency to manage state commodities. Under the provisioning (ruzhong, 入中) method, merchants delivered frontier supplies in exchange for certificates redeemable here for government tea. Leveraging its strategic waterways, the city became a primary transport clearinghouse; it redistributed tea to northern markets, consolidated and dispatched Huainan salt, often utilizing the backhauling capacity of returning grain tribute vessels.

At the turn of the 11th century, the Supply Commission (發運司), which supervised the forwarding to the dynastic capital of taxes and revenues from state monopolies, among the six circuits of the middle and lower Yangtze was moved to Jian'an from Kaifeng.

In 1012, Emperor Zhenzong commissioned Li Pu, then Supply Commissioner, to oversee the casting of four gold-leafed bronze statues for the Realm of Jade Purity (Yuqing zhaoying gong, 玉清昭應宮) in Kaifeng. Completed in 1013 on a hill northwest of the city, with gold reportedly requisitioned from private holdings, the largest of these was a twenty-five-foot (7.6 m) Jade Emperor statue.

In recognition of its contribution, following the statues' arrival in Kaifeng, the Emperor elevated Jian'an Army to Zhen Prefecture (Zhenzhou, 眞州). The Yizhen (儀眞) Abbey, established at the original casting site, later lent its name to the county when it was formally renamed Yizhen during the Ming dynasty.

In 1026, the introduction of the pound lock replaced older flash locks, allowing vessels to navigate varying water levels directly. Although through-navigation lessened the need for transshipment, the mandatory three-day operational intervals for the locks ensured a steady concentration of trade, supporting high commercial tax revenues despite a small resident population.

During the Southern Song, Zhenzhou's role underwent significant transformation. While remaining a Huainan salt hub, its tea monopoly function and southern revenue routes—including tribute payments to the Jin—were diverted to neighboring Guazhou. As a frontline city in the Song-Jin conflicts, it suffered repeated raids. In response, a wing city was constructed to protect the dense commercial suburbs outside the main walls. Driven by a large military garrison and supporting services, the urban population of Yangzi County eventually accounted for approximately 40% of the prefecture's total inhabitants.

During the Yuan dynasty, Zhenzhou's economy recovered following the unification of North and South. The government established the Salt Control Station (批驗所) in the city, which served as the regulatory gateway for salt distribution into the Yangtze interior. The prefecture's annual customs revenue exceeded 10,000 Ingots, a fiscal level comparable only to Dadu and Hangzhou. During this period, the city remained a primary hub for commodity flows between the lower Yangtze and the northern capital.

=== Late Imperial and Republican Period ===
During the Ming and Qing dynasties, Zhenzhou was downgraded to Yizhen County under the jurisdiction of Yangzhou. Throughout this period, its significance was inextricably linked to the state salt monopoly and its position as a key logistical node on the Yangtze River. Following the relocation of the capital to Beijing, the Yizhen Canal also became a strategic gateway for grain tributes arriving from the middle and upper Yangtze.

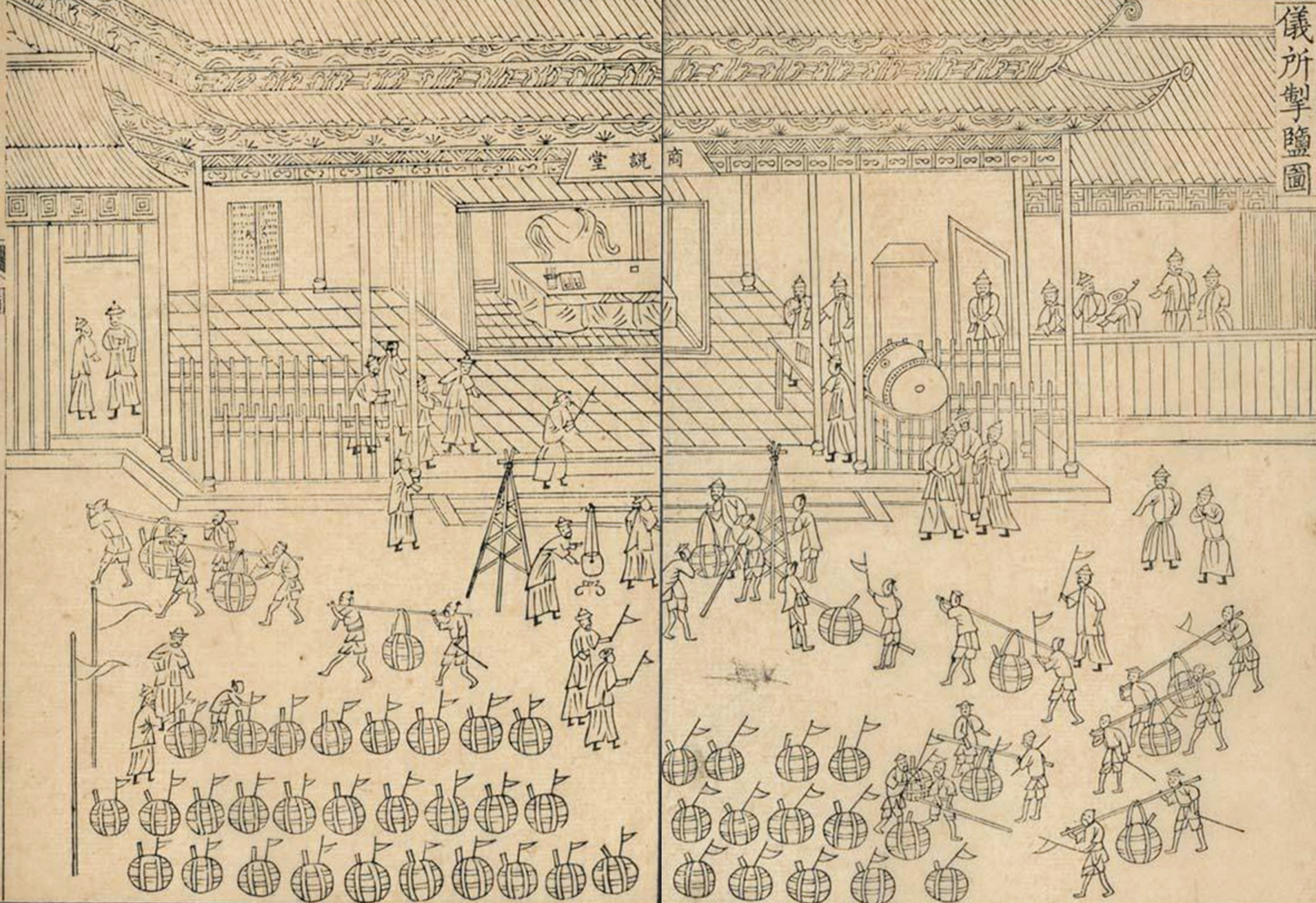
Illustration of Salt Inspection at Yizheng

During the Ming-Qing transition, Yizheng served as a strategic garrison for the Four Strategic Towns (Jiangbei sizhen) defense system under General Huang Degong. Following the collapse of the Southern Ming defense in 1645, the city fell to Qing forces. In the subsequent resistance, Ming loyalist Admiral Zhang Mingzhen conducted naval incursions into the Yangtze. His forces reportedly incinerated over a hundred salt junks at Yizheng. In 1723, it was renamed Yizheng because the homophone "zhen" (禛) was part of the Yongzheng Emperor's personal name and thus deemed ineffable.

The city's function as a salt regulatory hub was further intensified during the Qing dynasty. Huainan salt transported via canal from various salt yards was brought to Yizheng to be weighed, taxed, and repackaged for distribution. At its peak, the salt quotas for approximately three-quarters of the Huai salt destined for the middle Yangtze regions passed through the city. This transshipment process—transferring cargo from small canal lighters to larger river-faring vessels capable of navigating the Yangtze—became the primary local industry.

During the early and high Qing periods, on a designated day in the fourth month, salt officials would lead merchants in presenting ritual offerings to the River God, after which the year's first shipment to the Middle Yangtze was formally verified and sealed, initiating the state-sanctioned logistical cycle. Because the livelihoods of most residents depended on these shipments, this administrative ritual evolved into a major local festival marked by city-wide celebrations.

Many merchant families, particularly from Huizhou, chose to formally register their households in Yizheng county to participate in the salt trade. However, a significant number of these registered merchants chose to reside in the prefectural capital of Yangzhou.

In 1853, the Taiping Rebellion looted Yizheng and temporarily relocated the state's salt transport functions to Taixing. The silting of the canal further impeded recovery. In 1865, the Huai Salt General Depot was relocated to Guazhou, causing further economic stagnation.

Following the collapse of Guazhou's riverbanks in the early 1870s, the facility was relocated to Shi'erwei (十二圩), 12 li (approx. 6 km) southeast of the county seat, in 1873. This relocation shifted the region's commercial center away from the administrative capital. By the 1930s, while Shi'erwei remained prosperous, the county seat housed only 32,000 residents out of a total county population of 627,778.

=== People's Republic ===
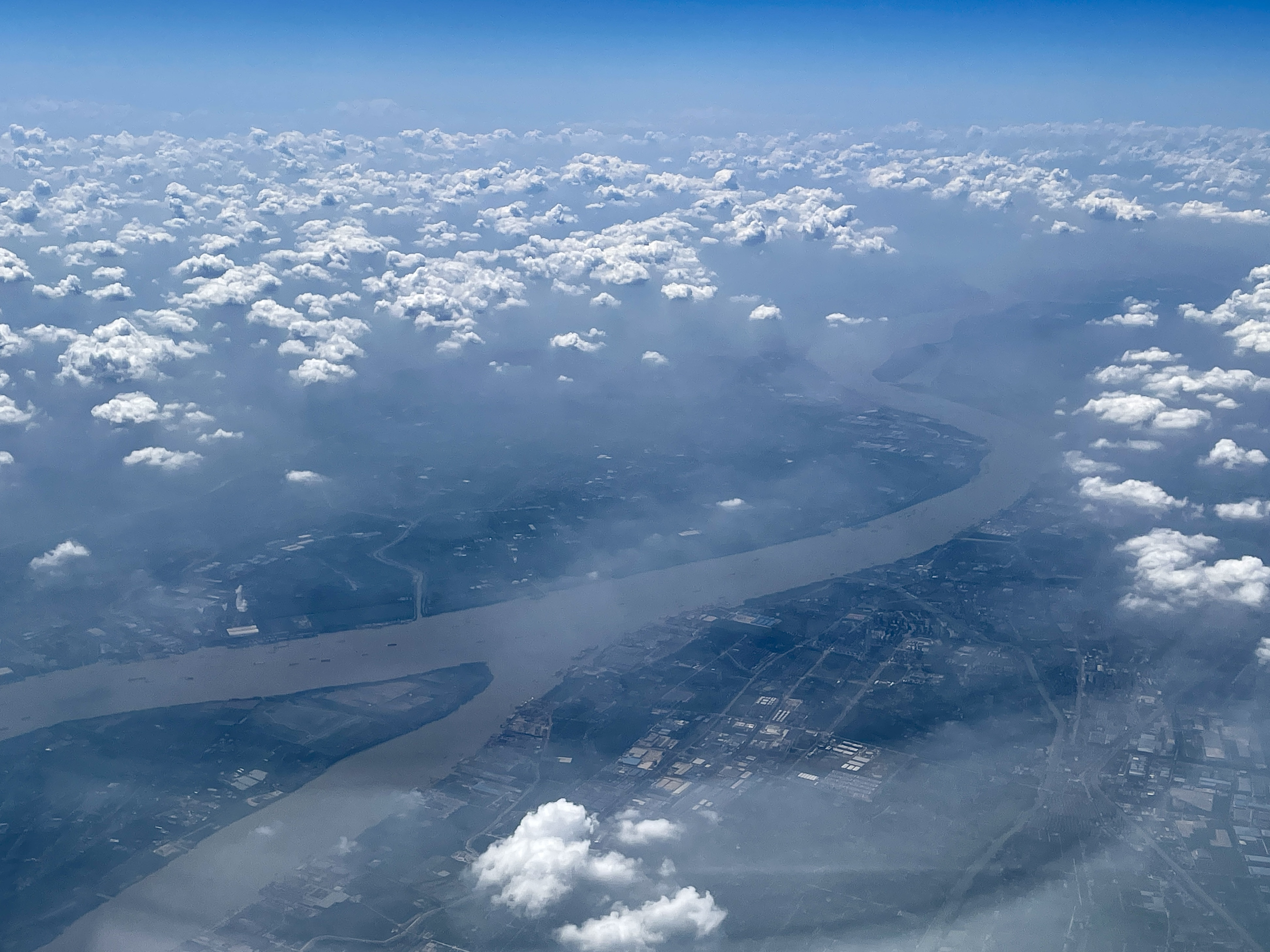
Aerial view of the Yangtze River: Shiye Shoal is at the bottom left, with Yizheng on the northern bank at the bottom. The riverfront of Yizheng features prominent shipyards and petrochemical industrial zones.

In the late 1970s, Yizheng re-emerged as a major industrial node. It was selected as the southern terminus of the 1,152-kilometer Luning Oil Pipeline, which transported crude oil from the Shengli Oilfield to the Yangtze.

In 1978, the Yizheng Chemical Fibre (YCF) plant was initiated as part of the "Twenty-two Large-scale Projects." Although the project faced potential cancellation during macroeconomic adjustments in 1980, it proceeded through a landmark financing arrangement. In 1982, the newly established China International Trust and Investment Corporation (CITIC) issued 10 billion yen in corporate bonds in Tokyo to fund the plant. This marked the first instance of a Chinese state enterprise utilizing international capital markets to bypass domestic budgetary constraints, a strategy subsequently referred to as the "Yizheng Model."

These developments integrated the city into national energy grids and established it as a major site for China's petrochemical and synthetic fiber industries.

== Geography ==
On the northern bank of Yangzhou, Yizheng is situated in the north of Jiangsu, and the Yangtze River lies in its southern territory. The city borders Luhe District of Nanjing on west, the urban area of Yangzhou on east and Tianchang of Anhui Province on north. The city owns a riverbank of 27 km (17 mi), facing Zhenjiang in opposite of the river.

Two major bodies of water, the Yangtze River and the Grand Canal, run through Yizheng from west to east and from north to south, respectively, dividing the city into four fractions.

== Climate ==
Climate data for Yizheng, elevation 23 m (75 ft), (1991–2020 normals, extremes 1981–present)
Month	Jan	Feb	Mar	Apr	May	Jun	Jul	Aug	Sep	Oct	Nov	Dec	Year
Record high °C (°F)	21.7 (71.1)	27.2 (81.0)	34.4 (93.9)	33.5 (92.3)	35.9 (96.6)	37.5 (99.5)	40.0 (104.0)	41.1 (106.0)	38.2 (100.8)	33.3 (91.9)	28.1 (82.6)	22.6 (72.7)	41.1 (106.0)
Mean daily maximum °C (°F)	7.1 (44.8)	9.8 (49.6)	14.8 (58.6)	21.1 (70.0)	26.3 (79.3)	29.1 (84.4)	32.2 (90.0)	31.6 (88.9)	27.7 (81.9)	22.6 (72.7)	16.3 (61.3)	9.7 (49.5)	20.7 (69.3)
Daily mean °C (°F)	2.8 (37.0)	5.1 (41.2)	9.8 (49.6)	15.8 (60.4)	21.2 (70.2)	24.8 (76.6)	28.2 (82.8)	27.5 (81.5)	23.1 (73.6)	17.6 (63.7)	11.3 (52.3)	5.0 (41.0)	16.0 (60.8)
Mean daily minimum °C (°F)	−0.5 (31.1)	1.5 (34.7)	5.5 (41.9)	11.0 (51.8)	16.6 (61.9)	21.1 (70.0)	24.8 (76.6)	24.4 (75.9)	19.7 (67.5)	13.5 (56.3)	7.2 (45.0)	1.3 (34.3)	12.2 (53.9)
Record low °C (°F)	−11.0 (12.2)	−11.2 (11.8)	−5.2 (22.6)	−0.5 (31.1)	6.7 (44.1)	12.4 (54.3)	18.4 (65.1)	17.3 (63.1)	10.1 (50.2)	1.0 (33.8)	−4.3 (24.3)	−11.7 (10.9)	−11.7 (10.9)
Average precipitation mm (inches)	50.6 (1.99)	47.9 (1.89)	75.1 (2.96)	72.5 (2.85)	84.9 (3.34)	175.6 (6.91)	213.4 (8.40)	165.8 (6.53)	74.9 (2.95)	56.3 (2.22)	52.6 (2.07)	35.7 (1.41)	1,105.3 (43.52)
Average precipitation days (≥ 0.1 mm)	8.7	8.8	10.1	9.3	9.8	10.7	12.6	12.0	8.4	7.5	7.8	6.9	112.6
Average snowy days	3.5	2.9	1.0	0.1	0	0	0	0	0	0	0.5	1.3	9.3
Average relative humidity (%)	74	73	71	69	70	76	80	81	80	76	76	73	75
Mean monthly sunshine hours	133.5	130.5	160.7	184.9	193.9	152.7	187.7	192.7	166.6	169.7	148.3	146.0	1,967.2
Percentage possible sunshine	42	42	43	47	45	36	43	47	45	49	48	47	45
Source: China Meteorological Administration all-time extreme temperature all-time January high

== Administrative divisions ==
At present, Yizheng City has 9 towns.

- Zhenzhou (真州镇)
- Qingshan (青山镇)
- Xinji (新集镇)
- Xincheng (新城镇)
- Maji (马集镇)
- Liuji (刘集镇)
- Chenji (陈集镇)
- Dayi (大仪镇)
- Yuetang (月塘镇)

== Economy ==
Yizheng has developed a diversified industrial base supported by four major industrial zones: the Yangzhou (Yizheng) Automotive Industrial Park, Yangzhou Chemical Industrial Park, Yizheng Economic Development Zone, and Zaolinwan Tourism Resort. The city's pillar industries include automobile and auto parts manufacturing, equipment manufacturing, new materials, and modern services.

- The Sinopec Yizheng Chemical Fibre Company Limited is one of China's largest polyester producers. Established in the early 1980s, the company occupies 10 square kilometers and operates multiple production centers for PTA, PBT, polyester chips, and fibers. It was a key national industrial project, with equipment and technologies imported from Germany, Japan, and other countries.
- The SAIC Volkswagen Yizheng Branch is located in the Yizheng Automotive Industrial Park. Completed and put into operation in July 2012, it is the first standardized manufacturing plant of the Volkswagen Group in China.
- The Tencent Cloud Yizheng Data Center officially began operations in December 2023. Located in the Yizheng Economic Development Zone, it is Tencent's largest self-built data center in East China, with plans to deploy over 300,000 servers. The facility supports Tencent's full range of cloud services and marks the first phase of a million-server cluster planned for Jiangsu Province.
- The Baoneng City Plaza in Yizheng's Binjiang New Town opened on September 29, 2018. It is the city's first large-scale commercial complex, covering approximately 270,000 square meters of land, with a total construction area of over 800,000 square meters. The development includes a bilingual school, kindergarten, fitness center, residential apartments, garden-style housing, serviced apartments, LOFT offices, and a commercial street.

== Events ==
From April 8 to October 8, 2021, Yizheng hosted the International Horticultural Exposition 2021. Approved by the International Association of Horticultural Producers (AIPH) as a Category B international horticultural exposition, it was the first AIPH-recognized international horticultural expo held in the Yangtze River Delta. The event took place at the Zaolinwan Tourism Resort in Yizheng.

In August 2019, Yizheng hosted the 19th edition of the Pan-Pacific International Youth Softball Baseball Invitational Tournament. The event featured teams from several countries and regions, including China, Japan, and Singapore, and marked the tournament's first appearance in mainland China.

== Transportation ==
=== Road ===
==== Expressways ====
- G40 Shanghai–Xi'an Expressway
- G9904 Nanjing Metropolitan Area Ring Expressway — Crosses the Yangtze River via the Ningyang Yangtze River Bridge, connecting Yizheng on the northern bank with Qixia District in southern Nanjing.

==== National Highways ====
- China National Highway 328
- China National Highway 345

=== Railway ===
- Nanjing–Qidong railway — Passenger services at Yizheng Station on this line were suspended on July 1, 2013.
- Shanghai–Nanjing–Hefei high-speed railway — Yizheng North Station, currently under construction in Yuetang, will serve this high-speed line upon completion.

=== Metro ===
Nanjing Metro Line S5 is a suburban rapid transit line extending into Yizheng. The stations located within Yizheng City are:

- Wannianlu Station
- Gongnonglu Station
- Tianningdadao Station
- Yizhengkaifaqu Station
- Puxi Station

== Sister cities ==
- (Canada) Timmins, Ontario
