= Zhenzhou, Sichuan =

Town in Junlian County, Yibin city, Sichuan, China

Zhenzhou 镇舟镇
- Town
- Location in Sichuan
- Coordinates: 28.0116°N 104.6781°E
- Country: People's Republic of China
- Province: Sichuan
- Prefecture-level city: Yibin
- County: Junlian County
- Time zone: UTC+8 (China Standard)

Zhenzhou (镇舟镇) is a town in Junlian County, Yibin city, Sichuan, China. In August 2019, Gaokan Township was abolished, and its administrative area was placed under the jurisdiction of Zhenzhou Town.

Zhenzhou Town administers the following areas:

Xingxun Community, Jinzhong Village, Majia Village, Yunling Village, Zhengxing Village, Qianjin Village, Jingyang Village, Jianfeng Village, Wuxing Village, Hongqi Village, Shunli Village. The Town People’s Government is located in Xingxun Community.
