= List of Volkswagen vehicles =

Volkswagen, the core brand of Volkswagen Group produces various models since its inception, ranging from passenger vehicles and commercial vehicles. It also consists of global products and regional products, specifically for large markets including Europe, China and Latin America.

Volkswagen AG annual report in 2022 reported that the best-selling model under the Volkswagen brand globally was the Tiguan, followed by the B-segment range of Polo, Virtus, Nivus and Taigo, and Passat/Magotan.

== Current models ==
=== Volkswagen Passenger Cars ===
Vehicles exclusive to Latin America Vehicles exclusive to China Other vehicles not sold in the European market

Model			Current generation		Platform	Vehicle description
Image	Name(s)	Introduction (cal. year)	Introduction	Main markets	Platform	Vehicle description
Hatchback
	Polo	1975	2009	Global (except North America, Middle East and India)	PQ26	Subcompact (B-segment) hatchback. Two generations (Mk5 and Mk6) are currently produced alongside each other for certain markets.
	Polo	1975	2017	Global (except North America, Middle East and India)	MQB A0	Subcompact (B-segment) hatchback. Two generations (Mk5 and Mk6) are currently produced alongside each other for certain markets.
	ID. Polo	2026	2026	Europe	MEB Entry	Battery electric subcompact (B-segment) hatchback.
	Golf	1974	2019	Global	MQB Evo	Compact (C-segment) hatchback.
	ID.3	2019	2019	Europe and China	MEB	Battery electric compact (C-segment) hatchback.
Sedan/liftback
	Virtus / Polo Sedan / Lavida XR	2017	2017	Latin America, India and China	MQB A0	Sedan version of the Polo Mk6. Sold in China as Lavida XR.
	Bora	1999	2018	China	MQB	Short-wheelbase compact sedan, sister model to the Lavida. Exclusively manufactured by FAW-Volkswagen. Succeeded by Sagitar S.
	Sagitar S	2026	2026	China	MQB Evo	Short-wheelbase compact sedan (C-segment), sister model to the Lavida. Successor to the Bora. Exclusively manufactured by FAW-Volkswagen.
	Lavida	2008	2018	China	MQB A1	Short-wheelbase compact sedan, sister model to the Bora and Sagitar S. Has been Volkswagen's best-selling model in China. Exclusively manufactured by SAIC-Volkswagen.
	Lavida Pro	2008	2025	China	MQB Evo	Short-wheelbase compact sedan, sister model to the Bora and Sagitar S. Has been Volkswagen's best-selling model in China. Exclusively manufactured by SAIC-Volkswagen.
	Jetta/ Sagitar/ Vento	1979	2018	Americas and China	MQB A1	Compact sedan (C-segment). Historically a sedan version of the Golf. Sold as the Vento in Argentina and Uruguay. The Sagitar is the Chinese version of the Jetta with longer wheelbase.
	Sagitar L / Jetta / Bora	2006	2025	China, Middle East and Kazakhstan	MQB Evo	Long-wheelbase compact sedan (C-segment). Exclusively manufactured by FAW-Volkswagen. Sold in the Middle East as Jetta A8. Sold in Kazakhstan as the Bora A8.
	Lamando	2014	2022	China	MQB Evo	A four-door coupe or a low-roof sedan for the Chinese market in the same segment as the Sagitar. Exclusively manufactured by SAIC-Volkswagen.
	Arteon/ CC	2017	2017	China, etc.	MQB	Mid-size fastback or four-door coupe. Successor to the Volkswagen CC.
	Magotan/ Passat	2005	2024	China, Middle East and Kazakhstan	MQB Evo	The Chinese version of the Passat B9 with a longer wheelbase. Sold in the Middle East and Kazakhstan as Passat B9. Exclusively manufactured by FAW-Volkswagen.
	Passat	1973	2019	China	MQB A2	Mid-size sedans developed for the Chinese market, different from the European Passat. Exclusively manufactured by SAIC-Volkswagen.
	Passat Pro	1973	2024	China	MQB Evo	Mid-size sedans developed for the Chinese market, different from the European Passat. Exclusively manufactured by SAIC-Volkswagen.
	ID. Aura L5	2026	2026	China		Mid-size full-electric sedan. Exclusively manufactured by FAW-Volkswagen.
	ID. Era 5S	2026	2026	China		Mid-size plug-in hybrid sedan. Exclusively manufactured by SAIC-Volkswagen.
	ID.7	2023	2023	Europe	MEB	Mid-size (D-segment) full-electric liftback sedan.
	ID. Unyx 07	2026	2026	China	CEA	Mid-size full-electric liftback sedan. Exclusively manufactured by Volkswagen Anhui.
	ID. Unyx 09	2026	2026	China	CEA	Full-size full-electric sedan. Exclusively manufactured by Volkswagen Anhui.
Station wagon
	Golf Variant/ Sportwagen	1993	2020	Europe, Australia, Japan	MQB Evo	Station wagon version of the Golf. The Alltrack model being the crossover-inspired version.
	Passat	1973	2023	Europe, Australia, Japan	MQB Evo	The European market Passat, only available as a station wagon since 2021.
	ID.7 Tourer	2024	2024	Europe	MEB	Station wagon version of the ID.7.
Crossover SUV						
	Tera/Tengo	2025	2025	Latin America and Southern Africa	MQB A0	Subompact crossover SUV (B-segment), sold in southern Africa as Tengo.
	T-Cross/ Taigun	2019	2019	Global (except North America)	MQB A0	Subcompact (B-segment) crossover SUV.
	ID. Cross	2026	2026	Europe	MEB Entry	Battery electric subcompact (B-segment) crossover SUV.
	Tharu XR	2024	2024	China	MQB A0	Long-wheelbase version of the T-Cross with minor cosmetic changes. Exclusively manufactured by SAIC-Volkswagen.
	Taigo/Nivus	2020	2020	Europe, Latin America	MQB A0	Low-slung crossover SUV heavily based on the Polo Mk6. It is badged Taigo in Europe and Nivus in Brazil.
	T-Roc (Mk1)	2017	2017	China	MQB A1	Subcompact crossover SUV based on the Golf.
	T-Roc (Mk2)	2017	2025	Europe, Middle East	MQB Evo	Subcompact crossover SUV based on the Golf.
	Taos/Tharu	2018	2018	China and Americas	MQB A1	Compact crossover SUV (C-segment). Related to the Jetta VS5, SEAT Ateca and Škoda Karoq. Called the Tharu in China and Taos in the Americas.
	Tiguan (Mk2)	2008	2016	China	MQB A2	Compact crossover SUV (C-segment).
	Tiguan (Mk3)	2008	2023	Global	MQB Evo	Compact crossover SUV (C-segment).
	ID. Tiguan	2026	2026	Europe	MEB+	Battery electric compact (C-segment) crossover SUV. Successor to the ID.4 and ID.5.
	ID. Era 5X	2026	2026	China	CMP	Compact (C-segment) full-electric crossover SUV. Exclusively manufactured by SAIC-Volkswagen.
	ID. Unyx 06	2024	2024	China	MEB	Compact (C-segment) full-electric crossover SUV, rebadged Cupra Tavascan with minor cosmetic changes.
	Tayron (Mk1)	2018	2018	China	MQB A2	Sister model to the Tiguan. Exclusively manufactured by FAW-Volkswagen.
	Tayron (Mk2) / Tiguan	2018	2024	Global	MQB Evo	Mid-size crossover SUV. Successor to the Tiguan Allspace, marketed as the Tiguan in the Americas.
	ID.6	2021	2021	China	MEB	Battery electric three-row mid-size (D-segment) crossover SUV.
	ID. Aura T6	2026	2026	China	CEA	Battery electric mid-size (D-segment) full-electric crossover SUV. Exclusively manufactured by FAW-Volkswagen.
	Atlas Cross Sport (MK1)/ Teramont X	2019	2019	Americas and China	MQB	Two-row versions of the regular Atlas/Teramont with a sloping rear roof.
	Atlas Cross Sport (MK2)	2019	2026	Americas	MQB Evo	Two-row versions of the regular Atlas/Teramont with a sloping rear roof.
	Atlas (Mk1)/ Teramont	2017	2017	Americas, Middle East, China	MQB	Three-row mid-size crossover SUV larger than Tayron. Sold in the Americas as the Atlas.
	Atlas (Mk2)/ Teramont Pro	2017	2025	Americas, Middle East, China	MQB Evo	Three-row mid-size crossover SUV larger than Tayron. Sold in the Americas as the Atlas.
	Tavendor	2022	2022	China and Middle East	MQB Evo	Two-row full-size crossover SUV for the Chinese market below the Talagon. Exclusively manufactured by FAW-Volkswagen.
	Talagon	2021	2021	China	MQB Evo	Three-row full-size crossover SUV for the Chinese market above the Tavendor. Exclusively manufactured by FAW-Volkswagen.
	ID. Unyx 08	2026	2026	China	XPeng Edward	Full-size (E-segment) full-electric crossover SUV. Exclusively manufactured by Volkswagen Anhui.
	ID. Era 8X	2026	2026	China		Full-size (E-segment) range extender crossover SUV. Exclusively manufactured by SAIC-Volkswagen.
	ID. Era 9X	2026	2026	China		Full-size (F-segment)range extender crossover SUV. Exclusively manufactured by SAIC-Volkswagen.
MPV/minivan
	Touran	2003	2015	China	MQB	Three-row compact MPV. Withdrawn from most markets by 2026 except China.
	Caddy Life	2007	2020	Europe and Oceania	MQB Evo	Passenger version of the Caddy.
	Caddy California	2020	2020	Europe and Oceania	MQB Evo	Campervan based on the Caddy.
	Viloran	2020	2020	China and Vietnam	MQB A2	Three-row full-size minivan with sliding doors for the Chinese market. Exclusively manufactured by SAIC-Volkswagen.
	ID. Buzz	2022	2022	Europe, North America, etc.	MEB	Battery electric full-size minivan.
	Caravelle	1950	2024	Europe and Oceania	Ford Pro	Large MPV based on the Ford Transit Custom (since 2024), passenger variant of the Transporter.
	Multivan	1990	2021	Europe and Oceania	MQB Evo	Large MPV.
	California	1989	2024	Europe and Oceania	MQB Evo	Campervan based on the T7 Multivan.
	Grand California	2019	2019	Europe and Oceania	MNB	Campervan based on the Crafter.

=== Volkswagen Commercial Vehicles ===
Model			Current generation		Platform	Vehicle description
Image	Name(s)	Introduction (cal. year)	Introduction	Main markets	Platform	Vehicle description
Van
	Caddy	1990	2020	Europe and Oceania	MQB Evo	Compact panel van.
	ID. Buzz Cargo	2022	2022	Europe and Oceania	MEB	Panel van version of ID. Buzz.
	Transporter	1949	2024	Europe and Oceania	Ford Pro	Mid-size van. Available as a panel van.
	Crafter	2006	2017	Europe, Oceania, and Middle East	MNB	Large van. Also sold as the MAN TGE.
	Tempest	2026	2026	Brazil		Large van based on the Maxus V90. Part of the Volkswagen Truck & Bus lineup.
Pickup truck
	Saveiro	1982	2023	Latin America	PQ24	Compact pickup truck based on the Gol.
	Tukan	2026	2026	Latin America	MQB A0	Compact pickup truck, successor of the Saveiro.
	Amarok	2010	2010	Latin America		Mid-size pickup truck. First and second generations are currently produced alongside each other for certain markets.
	Amarok	2010	2022	Europe, Australia and Africa	Ford T6	Mid-size pickup truck. First and second generations are currently produced alongside each other for certain markets.

== Former models ==
=== Aircooled models ===
- Volkswagen Beetle (Type 1) (1938–2003)
- Volkswagen Kübelwagen (1940–1945) light military vehicle
- Volkswagen Kommandeurswagen (1941–1944) staff car for Wehrmacht
- Volkswagen Schwimmwagen (1942–1944)
- Volkswagen Type 18A (1949–?)
- Volkswagen Hebmüller Cabriolet (1949–1953)
- Volkswagen Karmann Ghia (1955–1975, also sold as Type 34 Karmann Ghia, 1500 Karmann Ghia Coupe)
- Volkswagen 1500/1600 (Type 3) (1961–1973)
- Volkswagen Type 147 Kleinlieferwagen (1964–1974)
- Volkswagen 411/412 (Type 4) (1967–1973)
- Volkswagen Country Buggy (1967–1969)
- Volkswagen 181 (1968–1983, also sold as Kurierwagen, Trekker, Thing, Safari)
- Volkswagen-Porsche 914 (1969–1976, also sold as Porsche 914)
- Volkswagen SP1/SP2 (1973–1976)
- Volkswagen Brasília (1973–1982)
- Volkswagen Gacel (1983–1991)
- Volkswagen Senda (1991–1994)

=== Watercooled models ===
- Volkswagen K70 (1968–1972)
- Volkswagen Scirocco (1974–2017)
- Volkswagen Dasher (1974–1982)
- Volkswagen Rabbit (1975–1984)
- Volkswagen Derby (1977–1985), (1995–2009, also sold as Polo Classic)
- Volkswagen Caribe (1977–1987)
- Volkswagen Iltis (1978–1988)
- Volkswagen Cabriolet (1979–2002)
- Volkswagen Cabrio (1979–2002)
- Volkswagen Gol (1980–2023)
- Volkswagen Atlantic (1981–1984)
- Volkswagen Santana (1981–2022)
- Volkswagen Quantum (1982–1988)
- Volkswagen Parati (1982–2013)
- Volkswagen Voyage (1983–2023)
- Volkswagen Corsar (1984–1988)
- Volkswagen Citi Golf (1984–2009)
- Volkswagen Carat (1987–1991)
- Volkswagen Corrado (1988–1995)
- Volkswagen Taro (1989–1997)
- Volkswagen Apollo (1990–1992)
- Volkswagen Logus (1993–1997)
- Volkswagen Pointer (1994–1996)
- Volkswagen Sharan (1995–2022)
- Volkswagen Polo Playa (1996–2006)
- Volkswagen New Beetle (1997–2011)
- Volkswagen Jetta King (1997–2010)
- Volkswagen Lupo (1998–2005)
- Volkswagen Phaeton (2002–2016)
- Volkswagen Touareg (2002–2026)
- Volkswagen Fox (2003–2021)
- Volkswagen Golf Plus (2004–2014)
- Volkswagen Passat Lingyu (2005–2011)
- Volkswagen Eos (2006–2016)
- Volkswagen Suran/SpaceFox (2006–2019)
- Volkswagen Routan (2008–2014)
- Volkswagen Clásico (2010–2014)
- Volkswagen Jetta Pioneer (2010–2013)
- Volkswagen Vento/Polo Sedan (2010–2022)
- Volkswagen Beetle (2011–2019)
- Volkswagen Up (2011–2023)
- Volkswagen Passat NMS (2011–2022)
- Volkswagen New Jetta (2013–2020)
- Volkswagen Golf Sportsvan (2014–2020)
- Volkswagen SpaceCross (2014–2019)
- Volkswagen XL1 (2015–2016)
- Volkswagen C-Trek (2016–2018)
- Volkswagen Ameo (2016–2020)
- Volkswagen Phideon (2016–2023)
- Volkswagen Tiguan Allspace (2018–2024)
- Volkswagen Polo (Russia) (2020–2022)
- Volkswagen ID.4 (2020–2026)
- Volkswagen ID.5 (2021–2026)

== Volkswagen engines ==
- List of Volkswagen Group engines

== See also ==
- Volkswagen Group
