= Volkswagen of South Africa =

South African subsidiary of Volkswagen Group

Volkswagen of South Africa (Pty.) Ltd.
- Company type: Subsidiary
- Industry: Automotive
- Founded: 1946; 80 years ago
- Headquarters: Kariega, Eastern Cape, South Africa
- Area served: South Africa
- Key people: Martina Biene (Chairman and Managing Director)
- Products: Automobiles, pickup trucks, vans, auto parts
- Brands: Volkswagen
- Services: Automotive financial services
- Parent: Volkswagen Group
- Website: vw.co.za

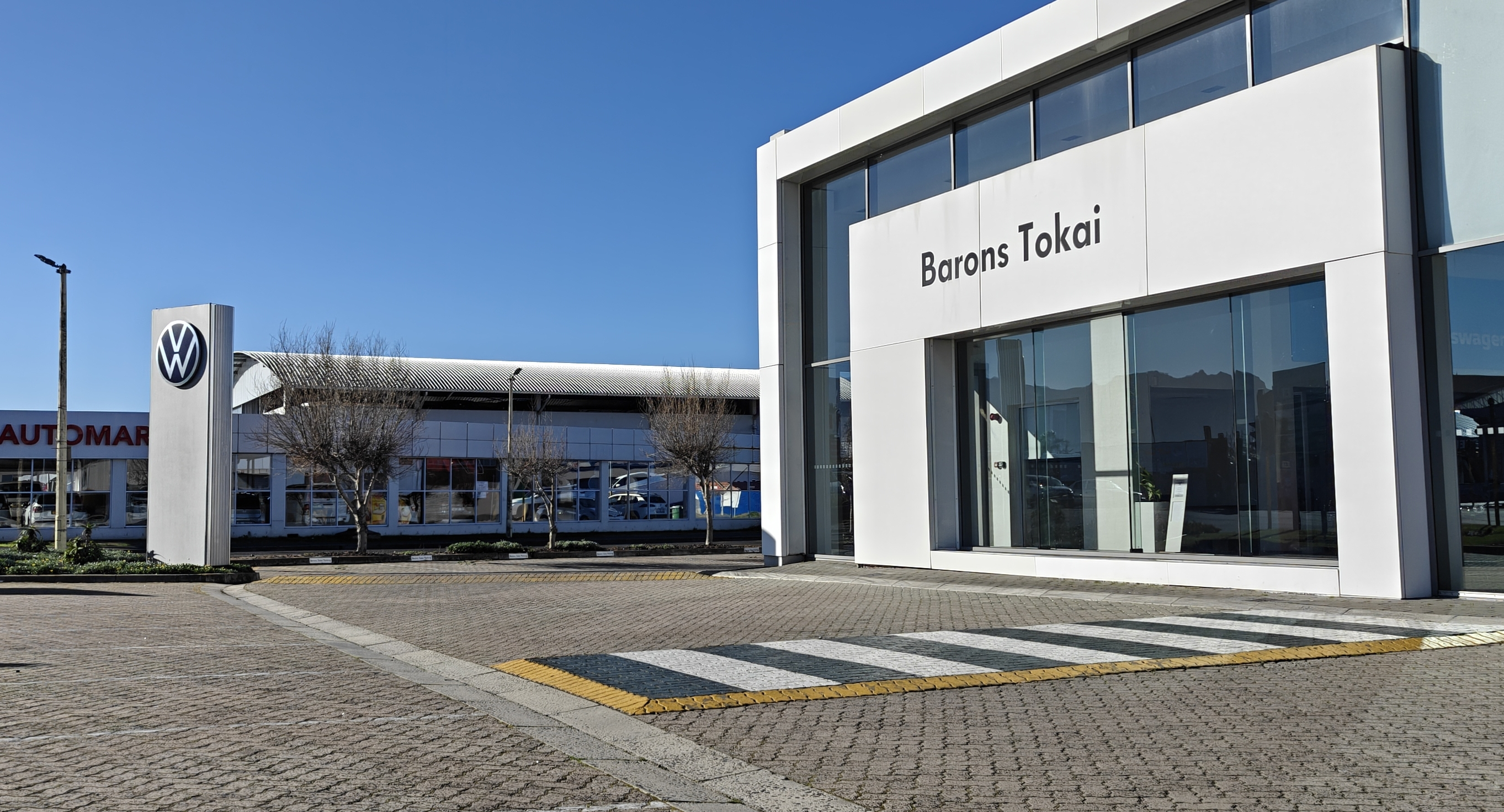
A Volkswagen dealership in Tokai, Cape Town

Volkswagen of South Africa (Pty.) Ltd. is the South African subsidiary of German automotive manufacturing company Volkswagen Group. Based in Kariega, in the Eastern Cape, the company was founded in 1946.

== History ==
As early as the 1930s, the manufacturer Studebaker had explored the possibilities of an assembly plant in South Africa. In 1947, an assembly plant was built in Uitenhage near Port Elizabeth.

At around the same time, Klaus von Oertzen, a former executive member of Auto Union, tried to get DKW models assembled in South Africa. Despite his considerable commitment, this attempt was just as unsuccessful as his first attempt to export Volkswagen models to South Africa. After renewed efforts and lengthy negotiations, production of the Beetle began on 31 August 1951 at South Africa Motor Assemblers and Distributors (SAMAD) in Uitenhage.

Volkswagen acquired a blocking minority in SAMAD in 1956. At the same time von Oertzen became the chairman of the board of SAMAD; he was nominally supposed to be followed by Heinrich Nordhoff in 1963. In 1966, SAMAD was renamed Volkswagen of South Africa Limited at an extraordinary general meeting. In 1966, SAMAD, in which Volkswagenwerk AG held 63% of the shares at the time, had around 2,460 employees and sold 21,888 vehicles. With 36,315 vehicles, Volkswagen became the best-selling brand in South Africa for the first time in 1973. In 1974, the plant became a wholly owned subsidiary of the Volkswagen Group.

In 2011, the plant in Uitenhage was the only non-European plant, besides the subsidiary in Mexico, that exported vehicles. From 2008 to 2013, Volkswagen was the market leader in the South African passenger car market. In 2015, Volkswagen of South Africa had 5600 employees.

In November 2024, Volkswagen announced its GenFarm project in Rwanda, an initiative to empower the agriculture landscape with electric-powered mobility especially for farming activities. Through this project, farmers can book electric-powered tractors that included trained drivers for their agricultural needs.

== Uitenhage Plant production ==
=== Current ===
- Volkswagen Polo (1996–present)
  - Volkswagen Polo Vivo
- Volkswagen Tengo (2026; upcoming)

=== Former ===
- Volkswagen Golf (1984–2013)
  - Volkswagen Citi Golf
- Volkswagen Jetta/Fox (1982–2010)
- Volkswagen Transporter/Kombi
- Volkswagen Beetle
