= Volkswagen Tukan =

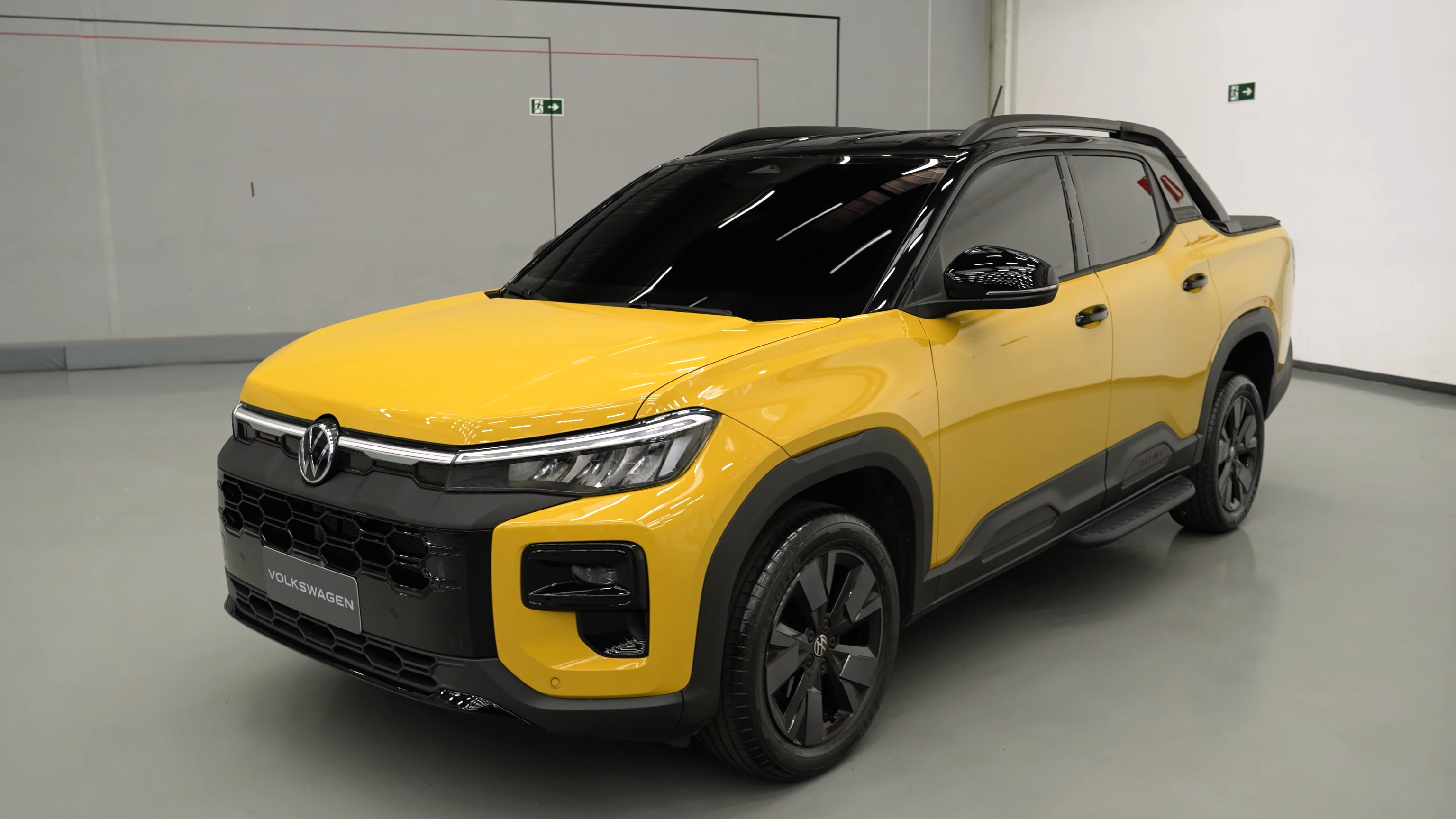

Overview
- Manufacturer: Volkswagen
- Production: 2026 (to commence)
- Assembly: Brazil: São José dos Pinhais, Parana (Volkswagen do Brasil)
- Designer: Under the lead of José Carlos Pavone

Body and chassis
- Class: Compact pickup truck
- Body style: 2-door pickup truck 4-door pickup truck
- Layout: Front-engine, front-wheel drive
- Platform: Volkswagen Group MQB A0
- Chassis: Unibody
- Related: Volkswagen T-Cross; Volkswagen Tera; Volkswagen Nivus; Volkswagen Polo Mk6

Chronology
- Predecessor: Volkswagen Saveiro

The Volkswagen Tukan is a compact pickup truck developed and produced in Brazil by Volkswagen do Brasil. Revealed on 21 August 2026, it is scheduled to reach Brazilian dealerships in the first half of 2027 as the successor to the Volkswagen Saveiro, becoming Volkswagen's fourth pickup nameplate sold in Brazil, after the Kombi Pick-up (1967), the Saveiro (1982), and the Amarok (2010).

The Tukan will be offered in single-cab and double-cab configurations. Its rivals in the South American market include the Fiat Strada, Chevrolet Montana, and Fiat Toro.

== History ==
The Tukan is intended to replace the Volkswagen Saveiro, which was in continuous production in Brazil for 44 years. It is Brazil's longest-running pickup nameplate, but is based on an ageing platform.

The Tukan name were first announced in February 2026 alongside Volkswagen's sponsorship of the Brazilian Football Confederation (CBF). Volkswagen also announced its launch colour, "Amarelo Canário" (Canary Yellow). A camouflaged prototype was displayed in May 2026 during a Brazilian national football team call-up event, ahead of the 2026 FIFA World Cup. Volkswagen fully revealed the uncamouflaged production design, on 21 August 2026 at the Festa do Peão de Boiadeiro in Barretos. The next-generation Amarok was also previewed at the same event.

Volkswagen said the Tukan had accumulated more than 2,000,000 km (1,200,000 mi) of field testing, including a programme in which customers used prototypes under actual working conditions. Feedback from this phase led to several engineering changes, including a revised air intake system after testing in dusty environments and a recalibrated air conditioning system for better cooling in hot regions.

== Design ==
The Tukan shares its underlying architecture with the Volkswagen T-Cross. Volkswagen said it deliberately avoided repeating the SUV's styling, whlist its predecessor, the Saveiro, shares its styling heavily with the Gol. According to José Carlos Pavone, Volkswagen's head of design for the Americas, all body side panels are new and unique to the pickup, sharing only the greenhouse glass with the T-Cross.

Its LED headlights sit higher than on the T-Cross, while the headlight cluster itself is shared with the Volkswagen Nivus. Its front clip include a black-finished trim and larger air intakes. The side profile came with angular wheel arches, and four character lines converging into an "X" motif. At the rear, the double-cab Extreme version has LED tail lights linked by a black trim panel that wraps around the tailgate, while on the single-cab Robust, this connecting panel is omitted to simplify repair and maintenance.

=== 4-door ===
Front view

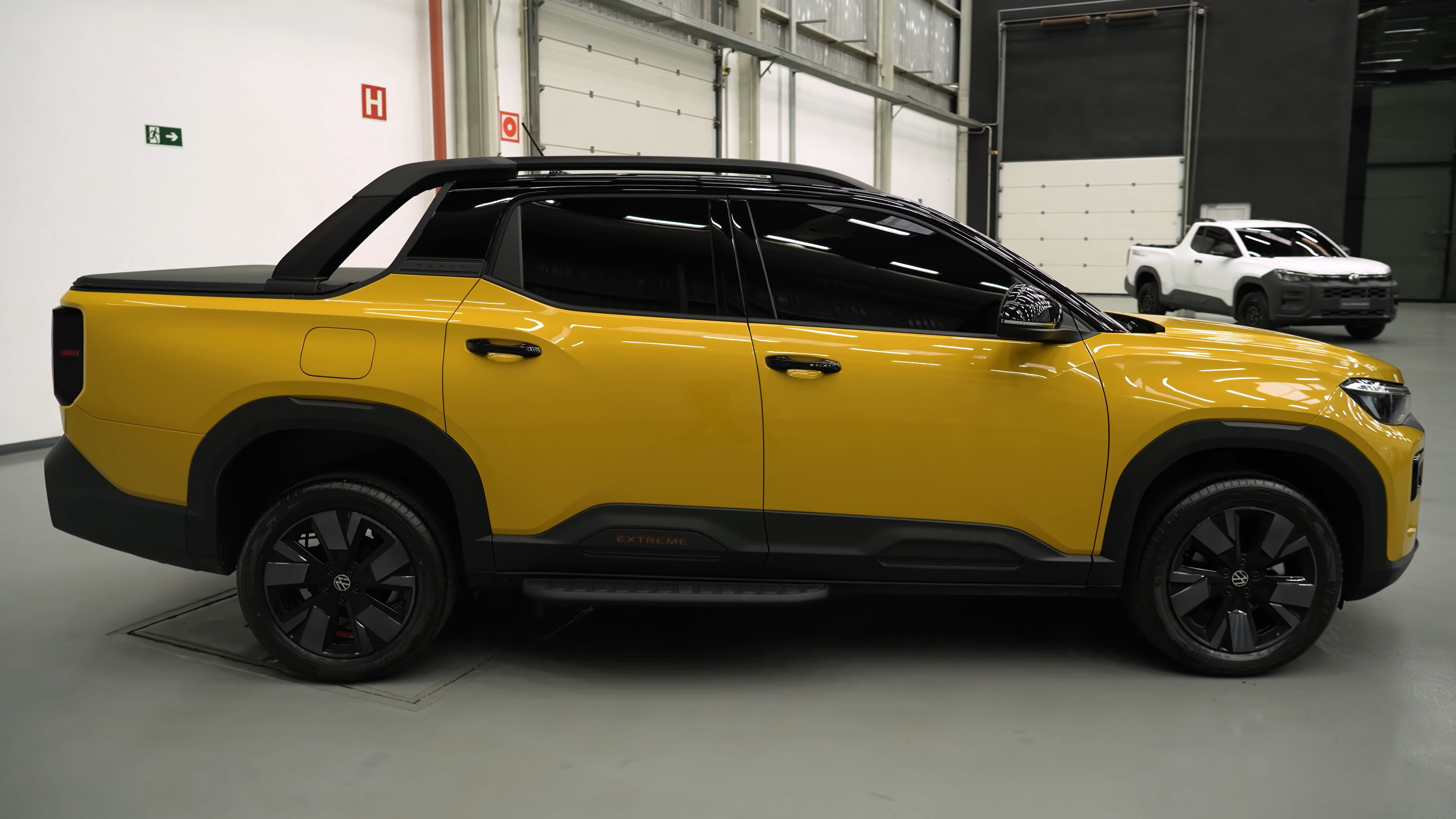
Side view

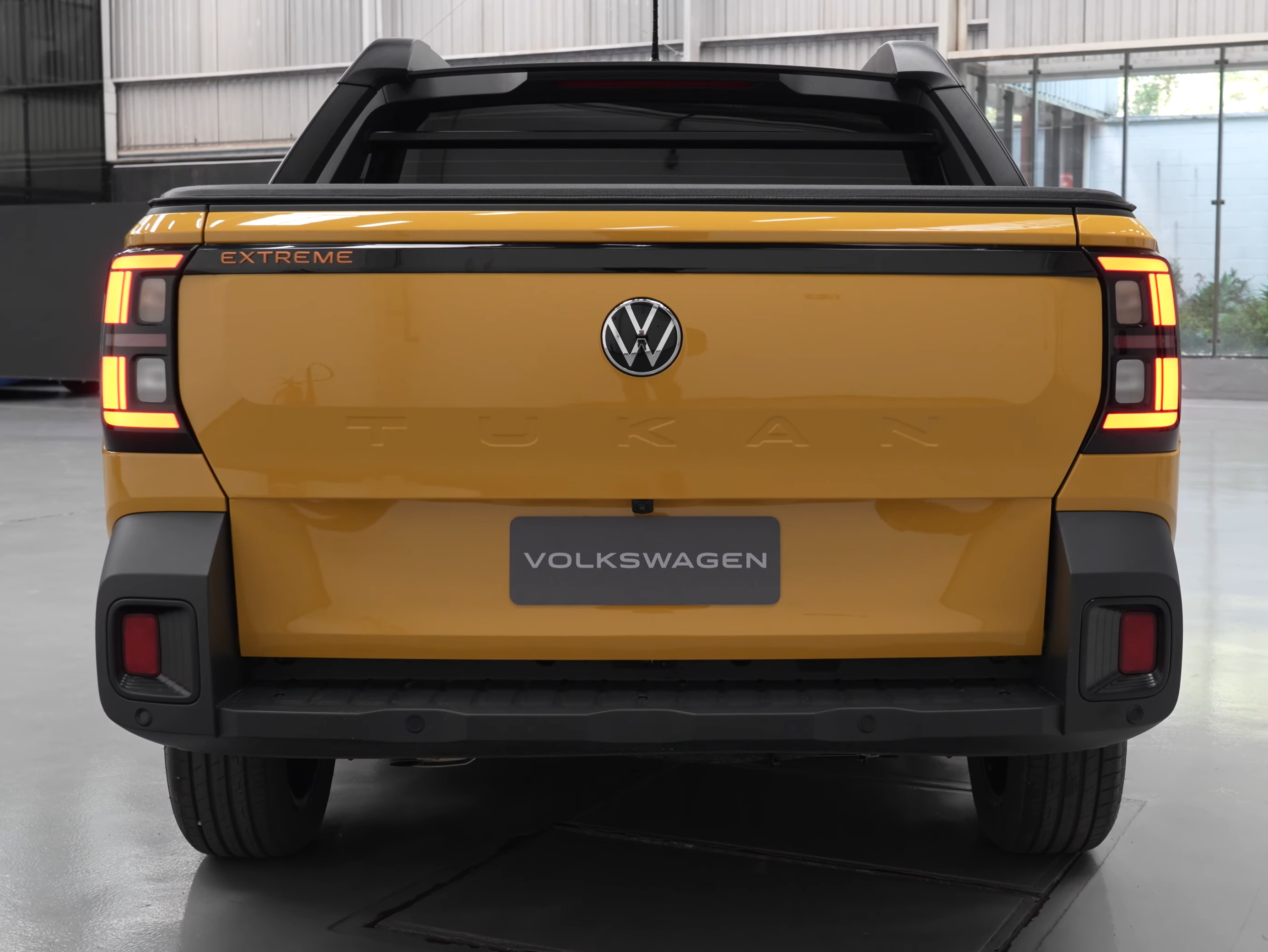
Rear view

=== 2-door ===
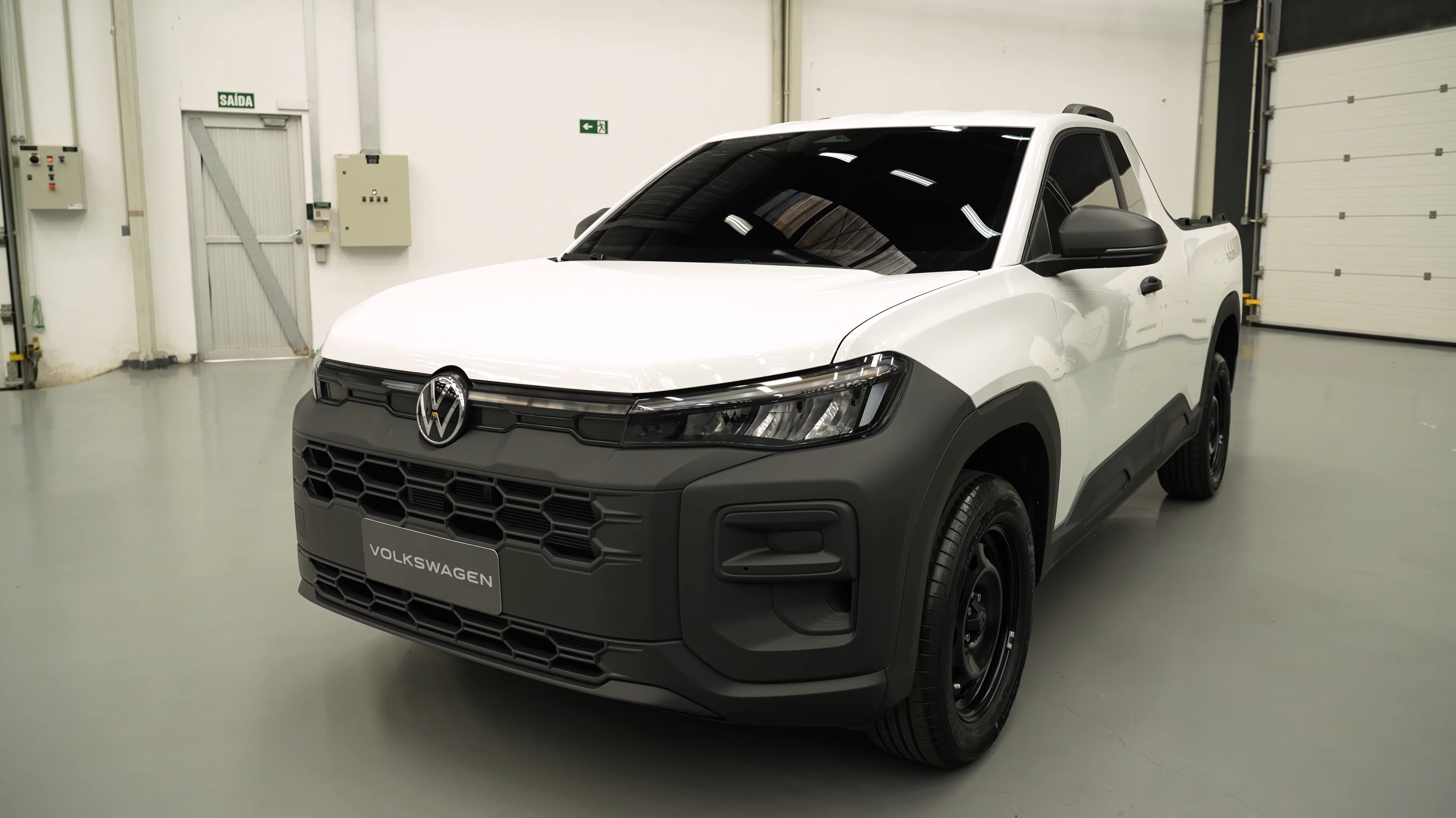
Front view

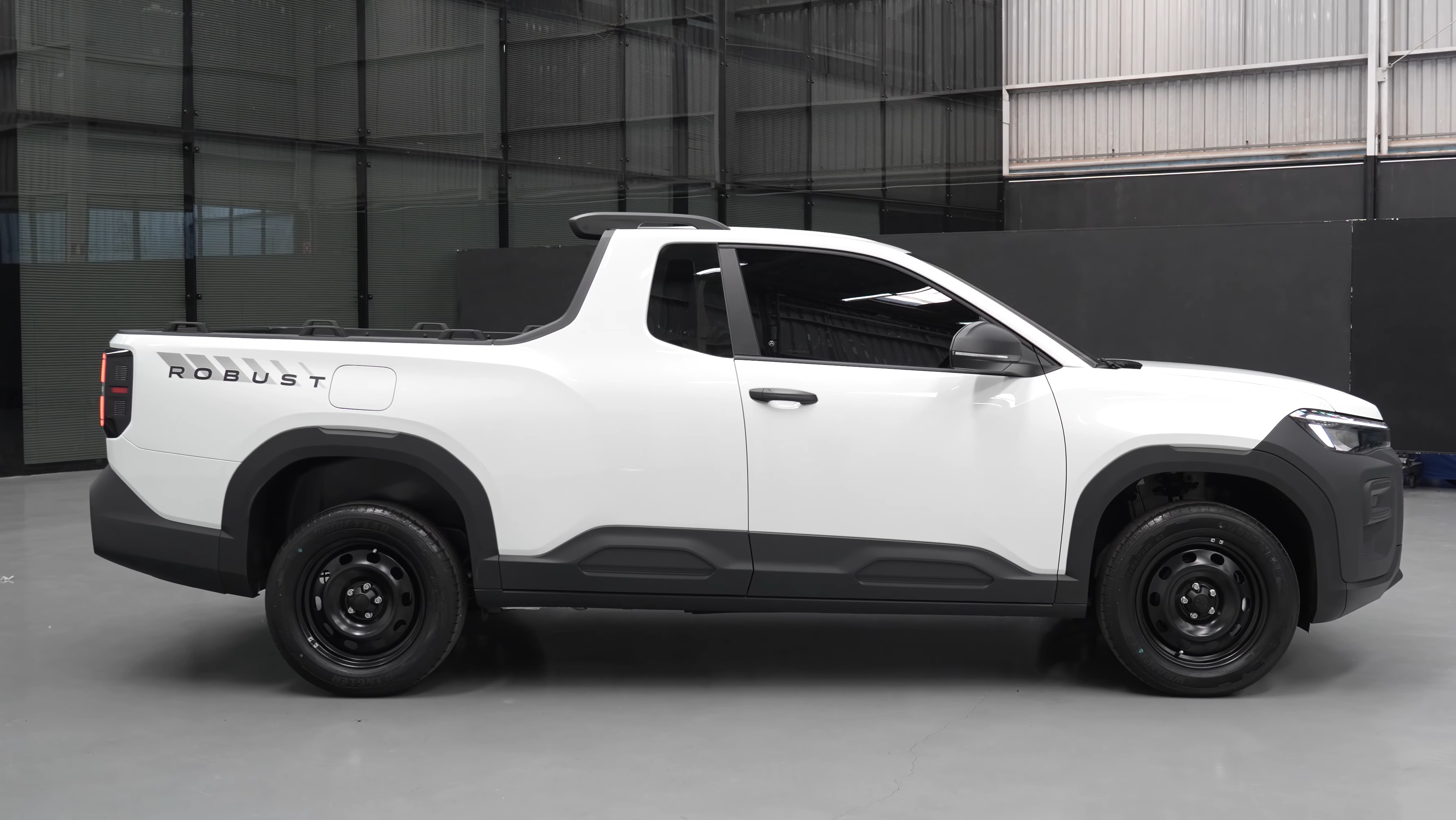
Side view

Rear view

== Platform and engineering ==
The Tukan is the first Volkswagen pickup built on the modular MQB platform, specifically adapted from the T-Cross platform. The wheelbase was lengthened to create space for the cargo bed without reducing cabin space. Unlike the Saveiro's torsion-beam rear suspension with coil springs, the Tukan uses a rigid rear axle with leaf springs across the entire range, a configuration also used by the rival Fiat Strada, intended to increase load capacity and durability while preserving ride comfort when unladen. The cargo bed is designed to accommodate standard pallet sizes and includes an integrated toolbox.

== See also ==
- List of Volkswagen vehicles
