= Volkswagen Tera =

Subcompact crossover SUV

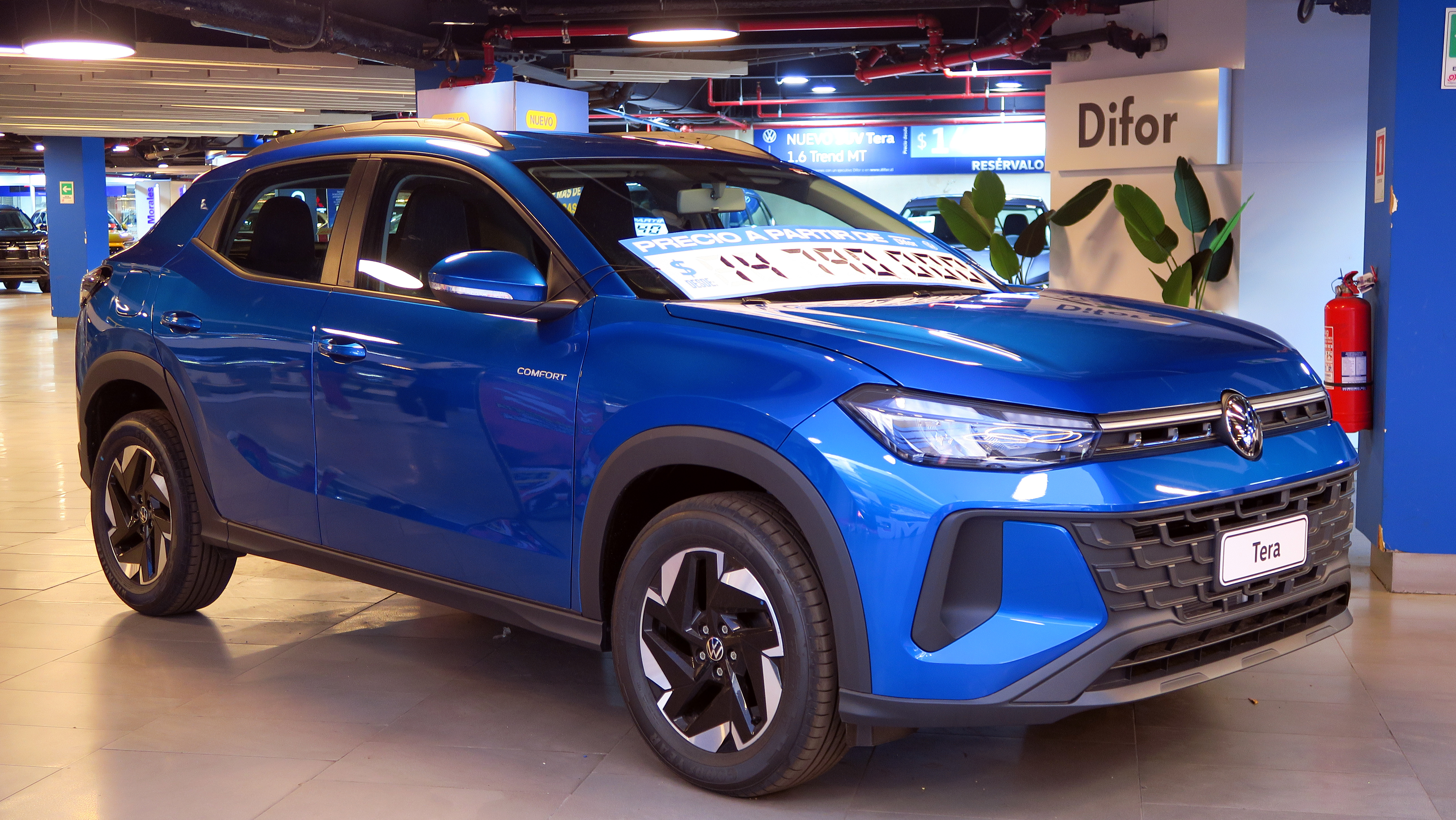
- VW Tera Comfort (Chile)

Overview
- Manufacturer: Volkswagen
- Also called: Volkswagen Tengo (South Africa)
- Production: March 2025 – present (Brazil); November 2026 – present (South Africa)
- Assembly: Brazil: Taubaté (Volkswagen do Brasil); South Africa: Kariega (Volkswagen of South Africa)
- Designer: José Carlos Pavone

Body and chassis
- Class: Subcompact crossover SUV
- Body style: 5-door hatchback
- Platform: Volkswagen Group MQB A0
- Related: Volkswagen Tukan; Volkswagen Polo Mk6; Volkswagen Nivus

Powertrain
- Engine: 1.0 L MPI I3; 1.0 L TSI I3; 1.6 L MSI I4
- Transmission: 5-speed manual; 6-speed automatic

Dimensions
- Wheelbase: 2,566 mm (101.0 in)
- Length: 4,100 mm (161.4 in)
- Width: 1,783 mm (70.2 in)
- Height: 1,575 mm (62.0 in)
- Kerb weight: 1,154 kg (2,544 lb)

Chronology
- Predecessor: Volkswagen Gol

The Volkswagen Tera is a subcompact crossover SUV produced by the German automaker Volkswagen primarily for the Brazilian market since 2025. It will be sold as the Volkswagen Tengo in South Africa.

== Overview ==
The car was first spotted testing in Rio de Janeiro in September 2024. In addition to being manufactured in Brazil it will also be manufactured at Volkswagen's Kariega plant in South Africa. Alongside the Škoda Kylaq and the sixth generation Polo, it is based on the MQB A0 platform.

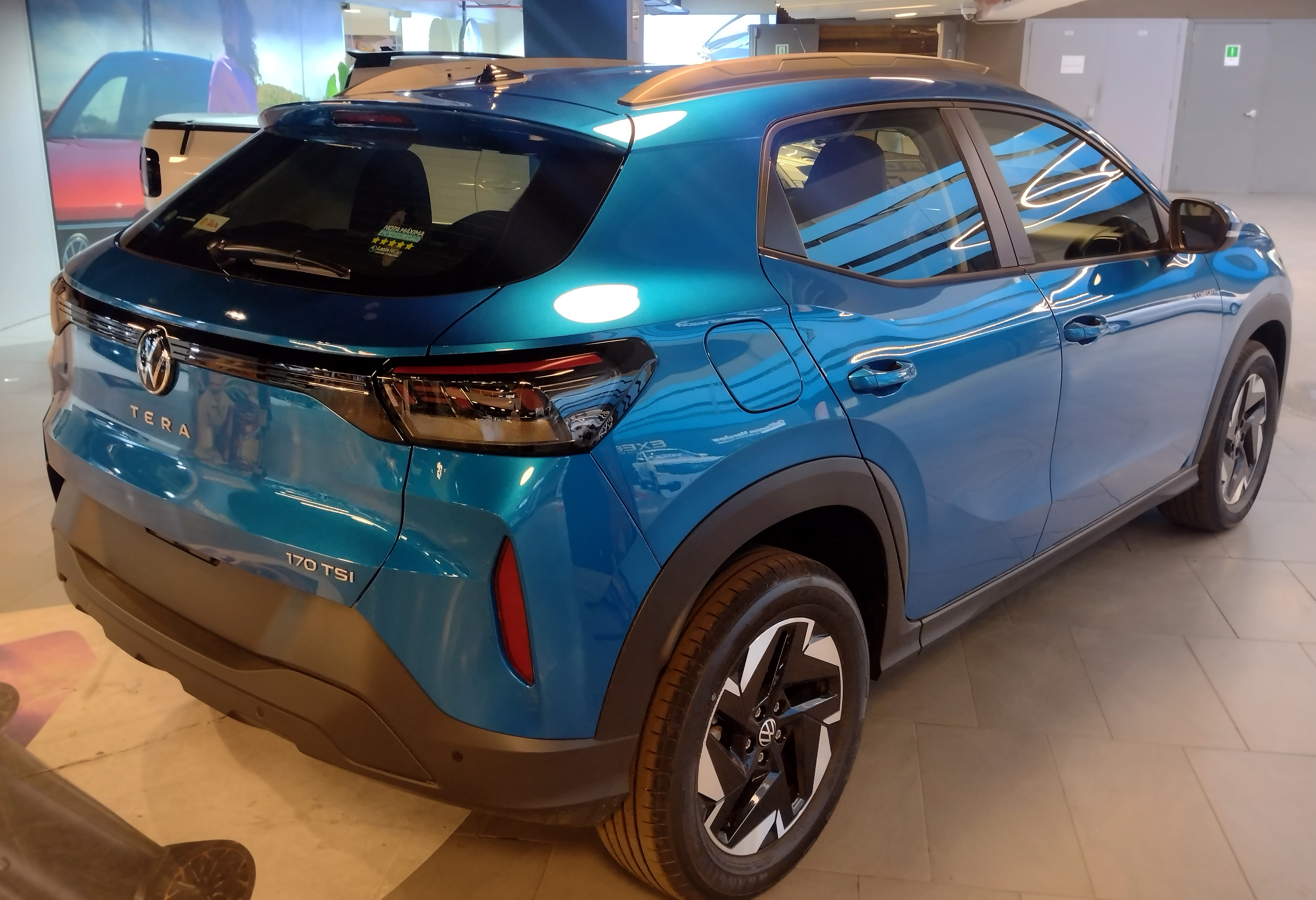
Rear view

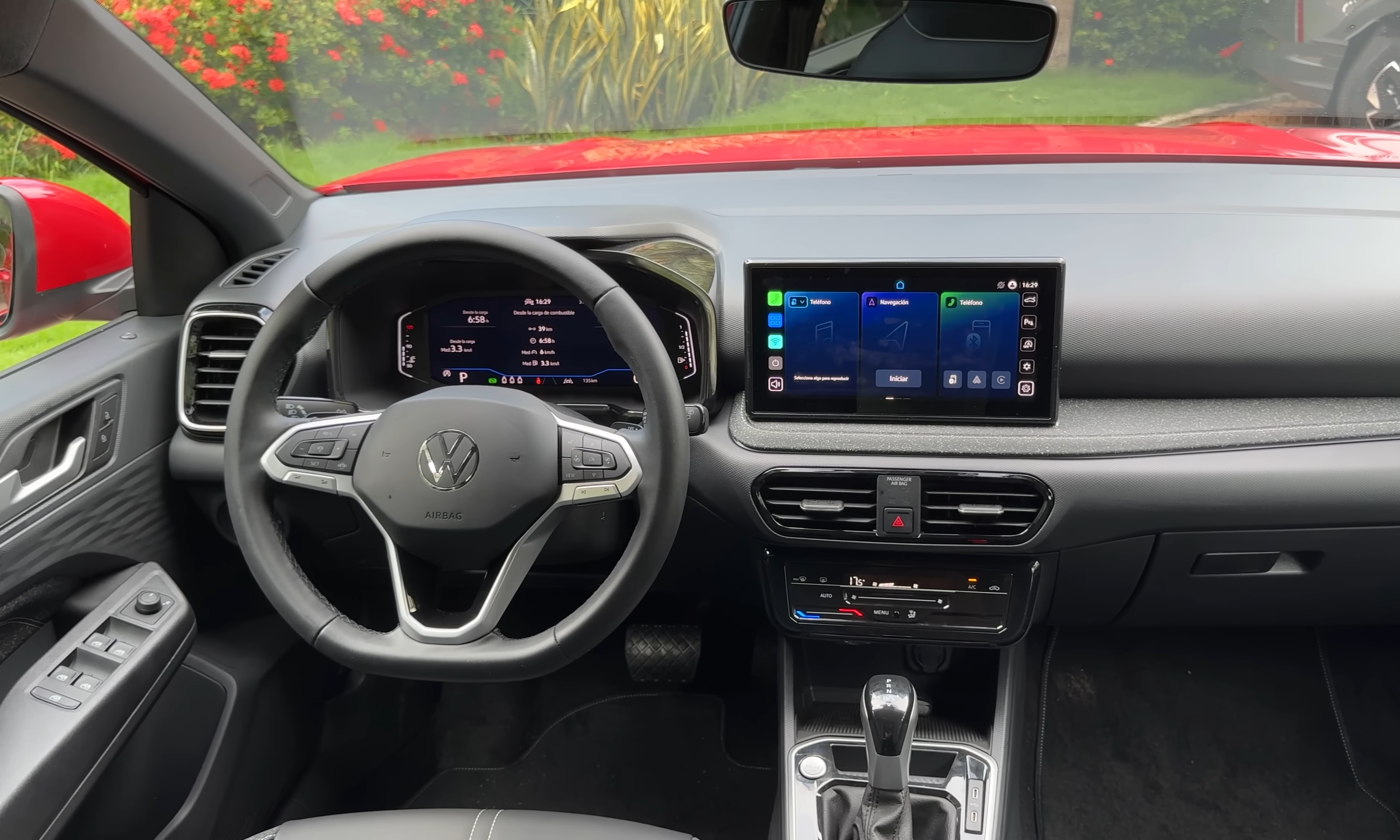
Interior

=== Design ===
Full-LED headlights and a slim grille are present in the front. Sculpted fenders are present on the sides. Small LED taillights are present in the rear, being connected by a black trim piece.

== Powertrain ==
The Tera is offered with three different engine options, a 1.6-litre inline-4, and two versions of a 1.0-litre 3-cylinder: one naturally aspirated (MPI) and one turbocharged (TSI). The 1.6 MSI naturally aspirated engine produces 110 hp (82 kW; 110 PS). The 1.0 MPI naturally aspirated version may produce around 70–84 hp (52–63 kW; 71–85 PS) depending on the markets it is sold. The 1.0 TSI turbocharged engine delivers 109 hp (81 kW; 111 PS) (in most markets), though some listings mention up to 116 hp (87 kW; 118 PS) in certain versions.

== Safety ==
The Tera was tested by Latin NCAP 3.0 in its most basic configuration for Latin America with 6 airbags in June 2025, it scored 5 stars.

Latin NCAP 3.5 test results Volkswagen Tera + 6 Airbags (2025, similar to Euro NCAP 2017)
Test	Points	%
Overall:	5 /5 stars	
Adult occupant:	35.95	90%
Child occupant:	42.75	87%
Pedestrian:	36.37	76%
Safety assist:	36.45	85%

== Sales ==
Year	Brazil	Argentina
2025	48,143	4,776
