= Volkswagen Jetta (A1) =

Volkswagen Jetta (Mk1, Typ 16)
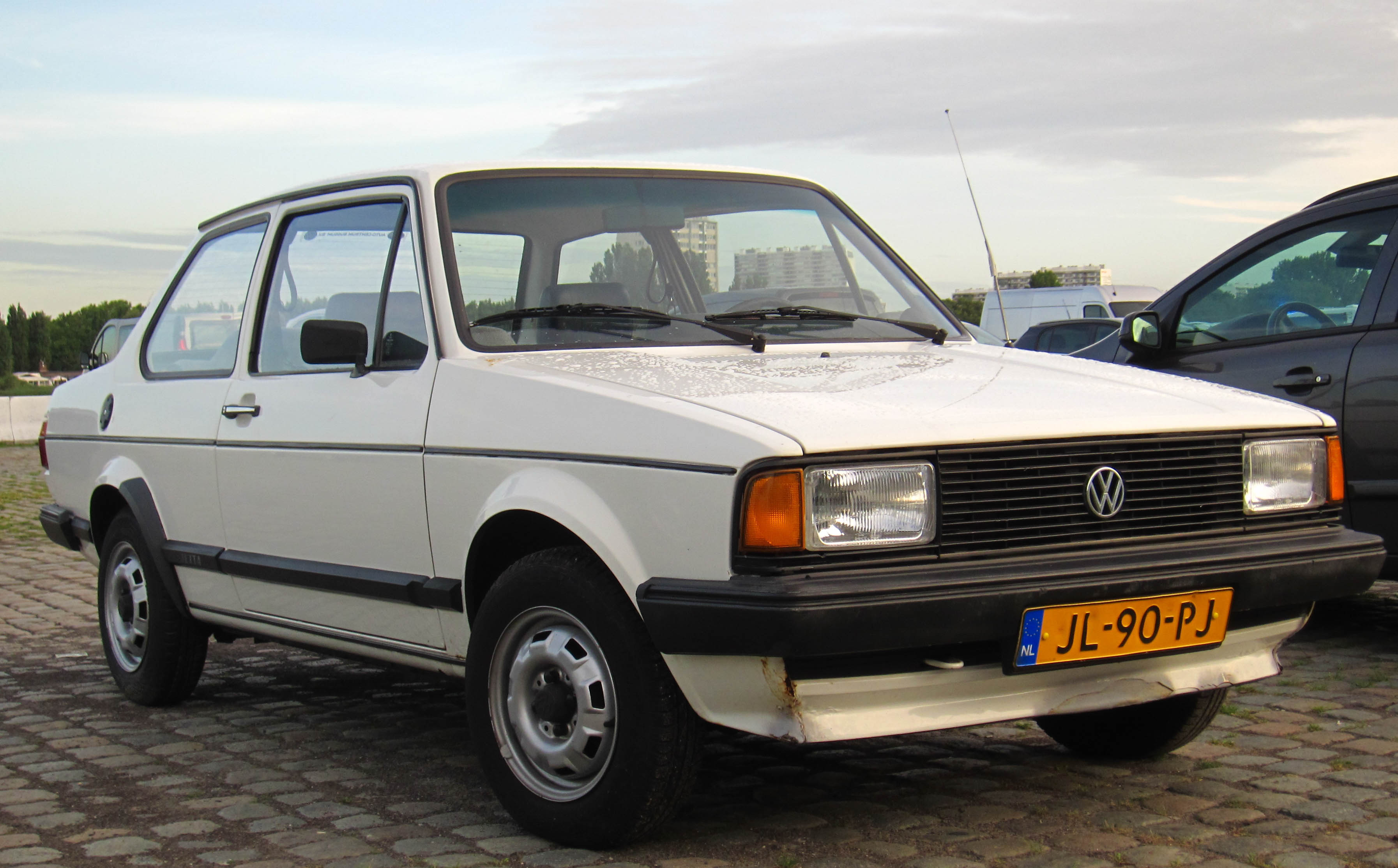

Overview
- Also called: Volkswagen Atlantic (Mexico); Volkswagen Fox (South Africa)
- Production: August 1979 – February 1984; 571,030 built 1982–1999 (South Africa)
- Assembly: Germany: Wolfsburg; Mexico: Puebla; South Africa: Uitenhage; Yugoslavia: Sarajevo (TAS)
- Designer: Giorgetto Giugiaro at Italdesign

Body and chassis
- Body style: 4-door notchback sedan / saloon 2-door notchback sedan / saloon
- Layout: Front-engine, front-wheel-drive
- Platform: Volkswagen Group A1 platform
- Related: Volkswagen Golf Mk1

Powertrain
- Engine: 1.1 L I4 (petrol); 1.3 L I4 (petrol); 1.5 L I4 (petrol); 1.6 L I4 (petrol); 1.8 L I4 (petrol); 1.6 L I4 (diesel); 1.6 L I4 (turbo diesel)
- Transmission: 4-speed manual 5-speed manual 3-speed automatic

Dimensions
- Wheelbase: 2,400 mm (94.5 in)
- Length: 4,270 mm (168.1 in)
- Width: 1,600 mm (63.0 in)
- Height: 1,410 mm (55.5 in)

Chronology
- Successor: Volkswagen Jetta (A2)

The Volkswagen Jetta A1 is the first generation of the Volkswagen Jetta compact car, produced by Volkswagen. Although the Golf reached considerable success in North American markets, Volkswagen observed that the hatchback body style lacked some of the appeal to those who preferred the traditional three-box configuration. The styling of the 1970 AMC Gremlin was controversial for truncating the Hornet sedan, but Volkswagen stylists reversed the process by essentially grafting a new trunk onto the tail of the Golf to produce a larger Jetta saloon. The Jetta became the best-selling European car in the United States, Canada and Mexico. Sales were slower in Europe, but were strong enough for Volkswagen to develop future generations of the Jetta.

== History ==
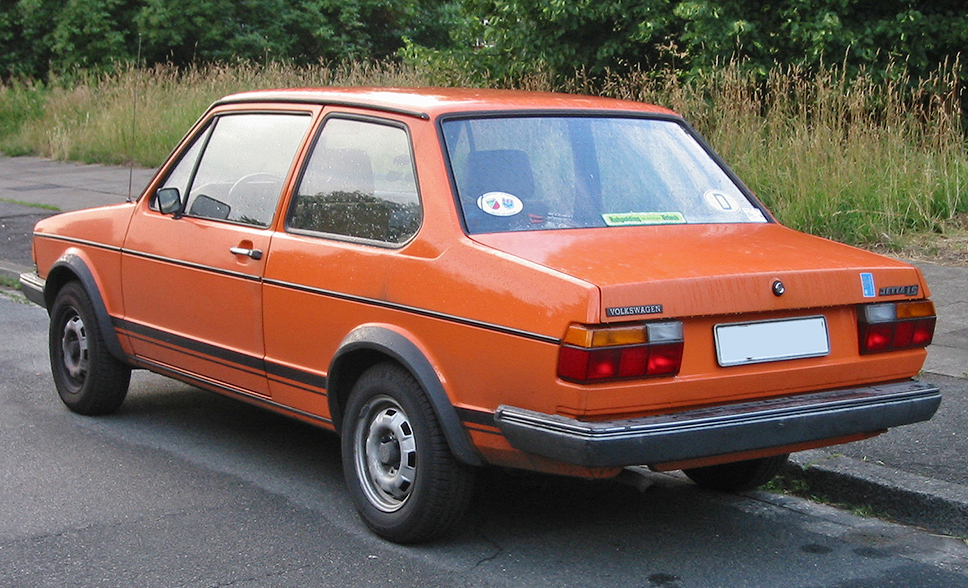
Volkswagen Jetta 2-door

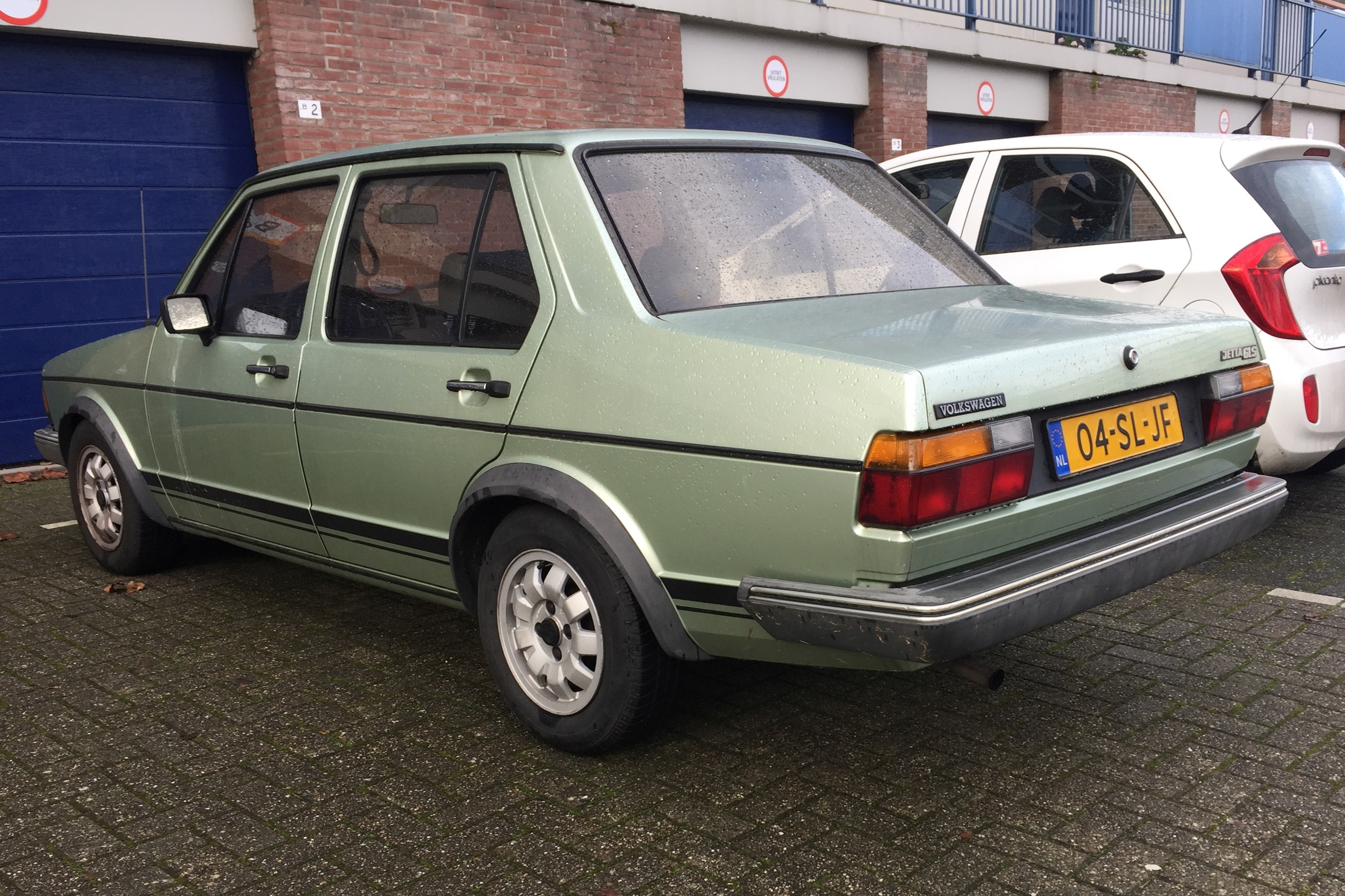
Volkswagen Jetta four-door

The Jetta was introduced at the 1979 Frankfurt Auto Show. Production of the first generation began in August 1979 at the Wolfsburg plant.

In Mexico, the Mk1 Jetta was known as the "Volkswagen Atlantic".

The car was available as a two-door sedan (replacing the aging rear-engined, rear-wheel drive two-door Beetle sedan in the United States and Canada) and four-door sedan body styles, both of which shared a traditional three-box design. Like the first-generation Golf, its angular styling was penned at ItalDesign by Giorgetto Giugiaro. Styling differences could be found depending on the market. In most of the world, the car was available with composite headlamps, while in the US, it was only available with rectangular sealed beam lamps due to Federal Motor Vehicle Safety Standard 108 (FMVSS 108). The suspension setup was identical to the Golf and consisted of a MacPherson strut setup in front and a twist-beam rear suspension. It shared its 2,400 mm (94.5 in) wheelbase with its hatchback counterpart, although overall length was up by 380 millimetres (15 in). The capacity of the luggage compartment was 377 litres (13.3 ft^{3}), making the Jetta reasonably practical. To distinguish the car from the Golf, interiors were made more upscale in all markets. This included velour seating and color coordinated sill to sill carpeting.

Engine choices varied considerably depending on the local market. Most were based on 827 engines of the era. Choices in petrol engines ranged from a 1.1 litre four-cylinder engine producing 37 kW (50 hp; 50 PS), to a 1.8-litre I4 which made 82 kW (110 hp; 111 PS) and 150 newton-metres (111 lbf⋅ft) of torque. Some cars were equipped with carburetors, while others were fuel injected using K or KE Jetronic supplied by Robert Bosch GmbH. Diesel engine choices included a 1.6-litre making 37 kilowatts (50 hp; 50 PS) and a turbocharged version of the same engine which produced 51 kilowatts (68 hp; 69 PS) and 130 newton-metres (96 lbf⋅ft) of torque.

Volkswagen briefly considered producing the Jetta at a plant located in Sterling Heights, Michigan, U.S. However, due to declining sales in North America, the decision was postponed and abandoned in 1982. The site was subsequently sold to Chrysler in 1983, and is still in operation as of 2023. This generation was also produced in SFR Yugoslavia, Bosnia and Herzegovina, under the joint venture Tvornica Automobila Sarajevo (TAS) for the Balkan area.

== US and Canada ==
In North America, the Jetta was introduced for the 1980 model year. Volkswagen was standardising their engine lineup, and the Jetta received the same 1588 cc four-cylinder with 76 hp (57 kW; 77 PS) at 5500 rpm as also used in the Scirocco, the Audi 4000, and fuel injected Rabbits. Specs were nearly identical for 49-state and Californian cars, although at 83 lb⋅ft (110 N⋅m; 11 kg⋅m) torque was a pound-foot lower in 49-state cars. Those states received a two-way catalytic converter and exhaust gas recirculation, while the Californian Jettas received a three-way catalyst and lambda sensor. The three-way catalyst electronics system required extra space and replaced the glovebox in early Californian cars.

For 1981, the engine was switched to the new North America-only 1715 cc unit with 74 hp (55 kW; 75 PS) at 5000 rpm. The dashboard was also upgraded (including the return of the glovebox on California cars) as were the seats and ventilation system.

== Safety ==
Volkswagen was an early adopter of passive restraint systems. The first-generation cars could be equipped with an "automatic" shoulder belt mounted to the door. The idea was to always have the belt buckled, thereby doing away with the requirement that the driver and passenger remember to buckle up. Instead of a lap belt, the dashboard was designed with an integrated knee bar to prevent submarining underneath the shoulder belt. One quirk was that cars with this system lost the central dash air vents (unless equipped with an AC). The passive system was standard on 1980 California cars, but was not available elsewhere in the United States until later.

In crash tests conducted by the National Highway Traffic Safety Administration, the Jetta received five out of five stars in a 56 km/h (35 mph) frontal crash test for both driver and passenger protection.

== Testing and review ==
The first-generation Jetta was met with generally positive reviews. Testers found the car handled precisely, although the lack of power steering contributed to heavy steering when parking. The brakes worked well for a car of the day, but some brake fade was evident. The ride was taut but firm in the typical style of German cars, with large bumps being well absorbed by the suspension but smaller undulations coming through. Reviews differed on noise levels; some found the car fairly quiet, while others thought the engine contributed to higher noise levels. Critics found the seating comfortable, but noted that the rear seat lacked sufficient head room. Most major controls and displays such as the speedometer and climate controls were well liked, but some secondary switches were said to not be well placed or intuitive. The aforementioned automatic seat belts in some markets that were attached to the door frame made it impossible to forget to buckle the belt, but it was difficult to enter the car with a package in hand. Writers liked that the luggage space was generous, especially for a car of its size. Additionally, numerous storage areas also gave practicality to the sedan. In one test, the car scored nearly as high as the more expensive Volkswagen Passat/Dasher and the Audi 80/4000.

The Volkswagen Atlantic was introduced to the Mexican market in February 1981, with its sole competition being the Renault 18. After the introduction of the Mk2 Jetta, the Atlantic continued to be manufactured and marketed in South Africa, badged as the "Fox". South African Foxes have the regular Golf front treatment, with round headlamps rather than the square ones used internationally. The Fox, like its Citi Golf sibling, received a facelift around 1990, with bigger, more rounded bumpers and a new grille. The Fox continued to be built until at least 1999.

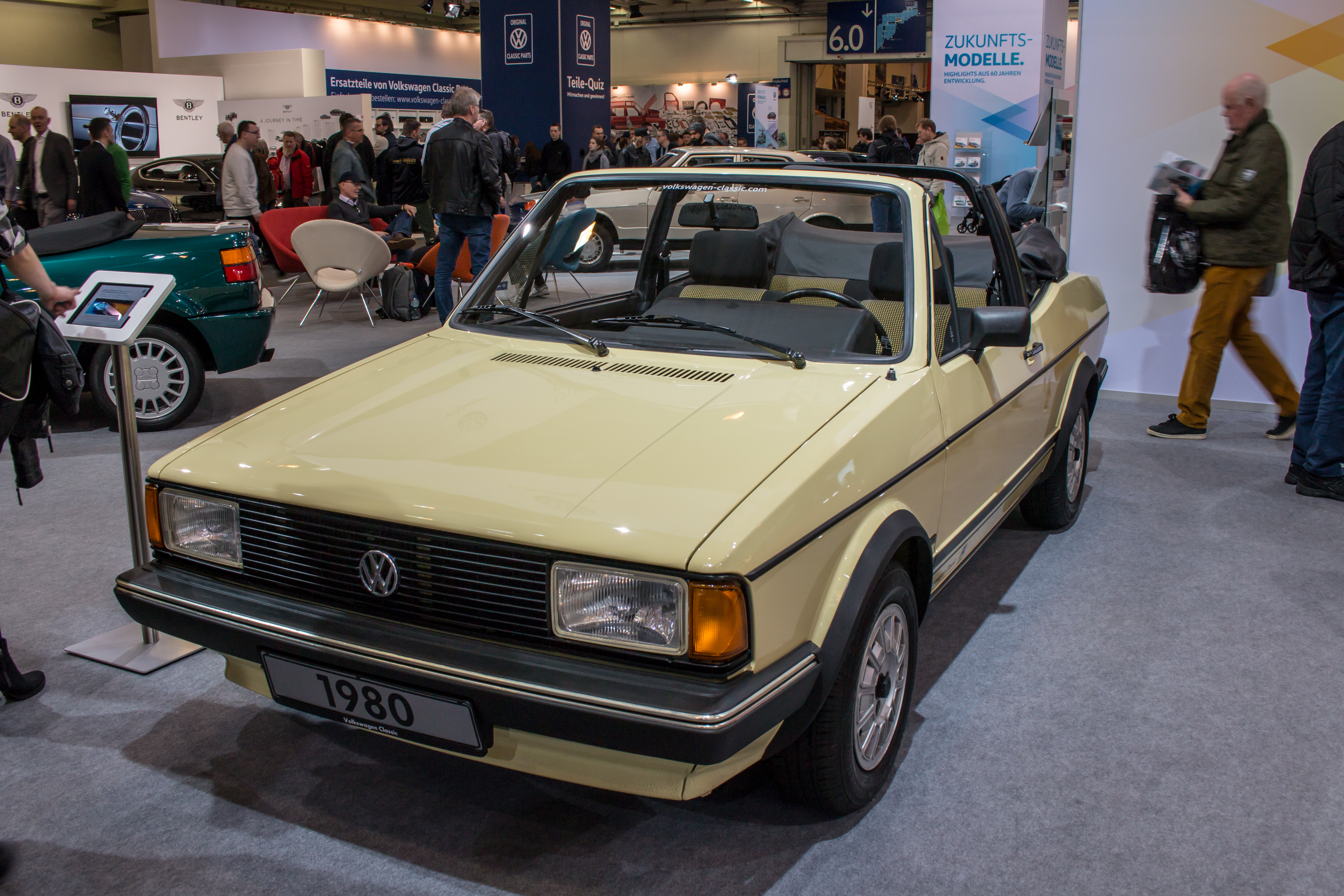
Volkswagen Jetta GLS convertible concept

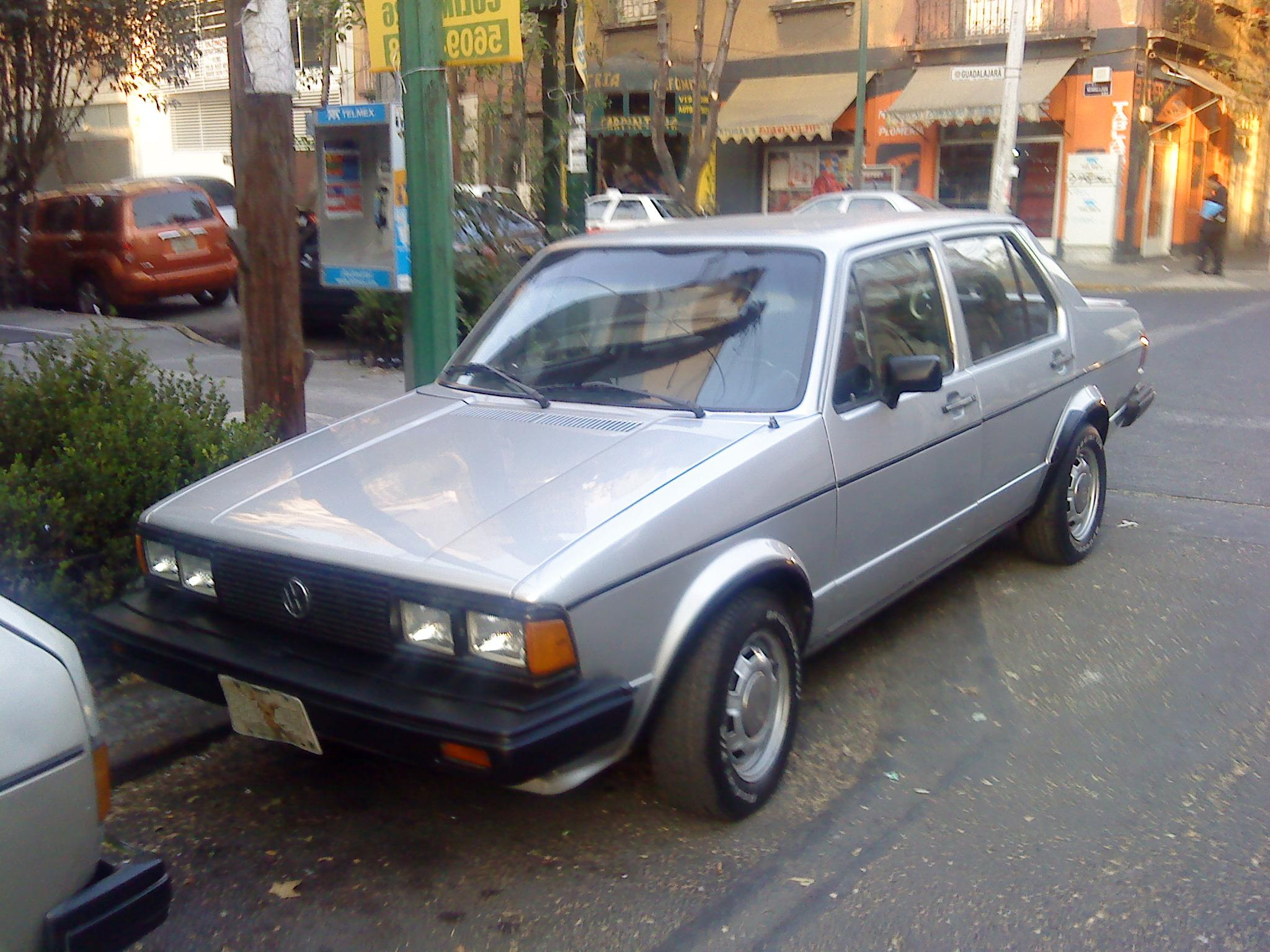
1986 Volkswagen Atlantic GL (Mexico)

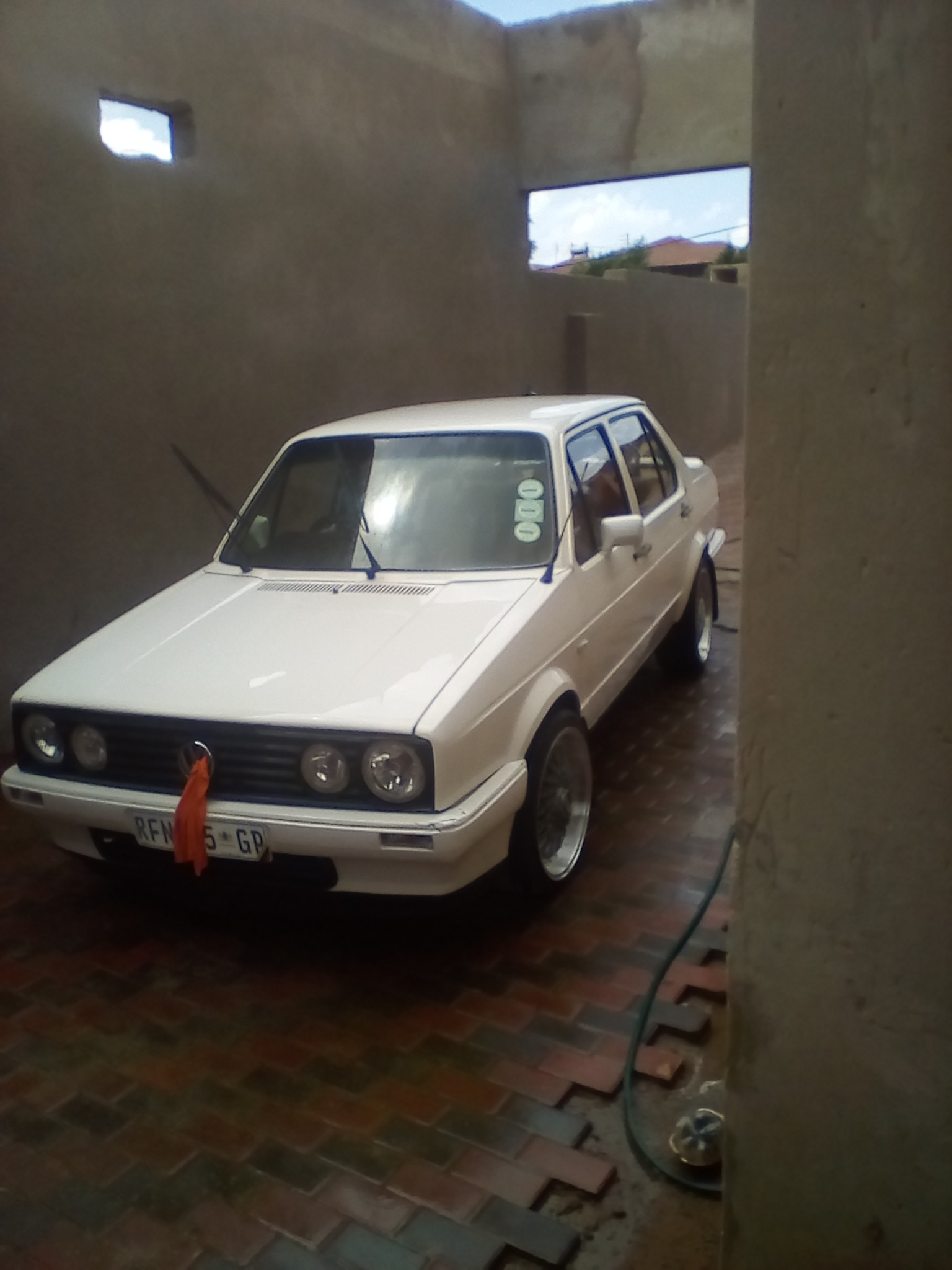
Volkswagen Fox (South Africa)

== See also ==
- Volkswagen A platform
- Volkswagen Jetta
- Volkswagen Golf Mk1
- Small family car
