= Volkswagen Taigo =

Subcompact crossover SUV

Volkswagen Taigo/Nivus
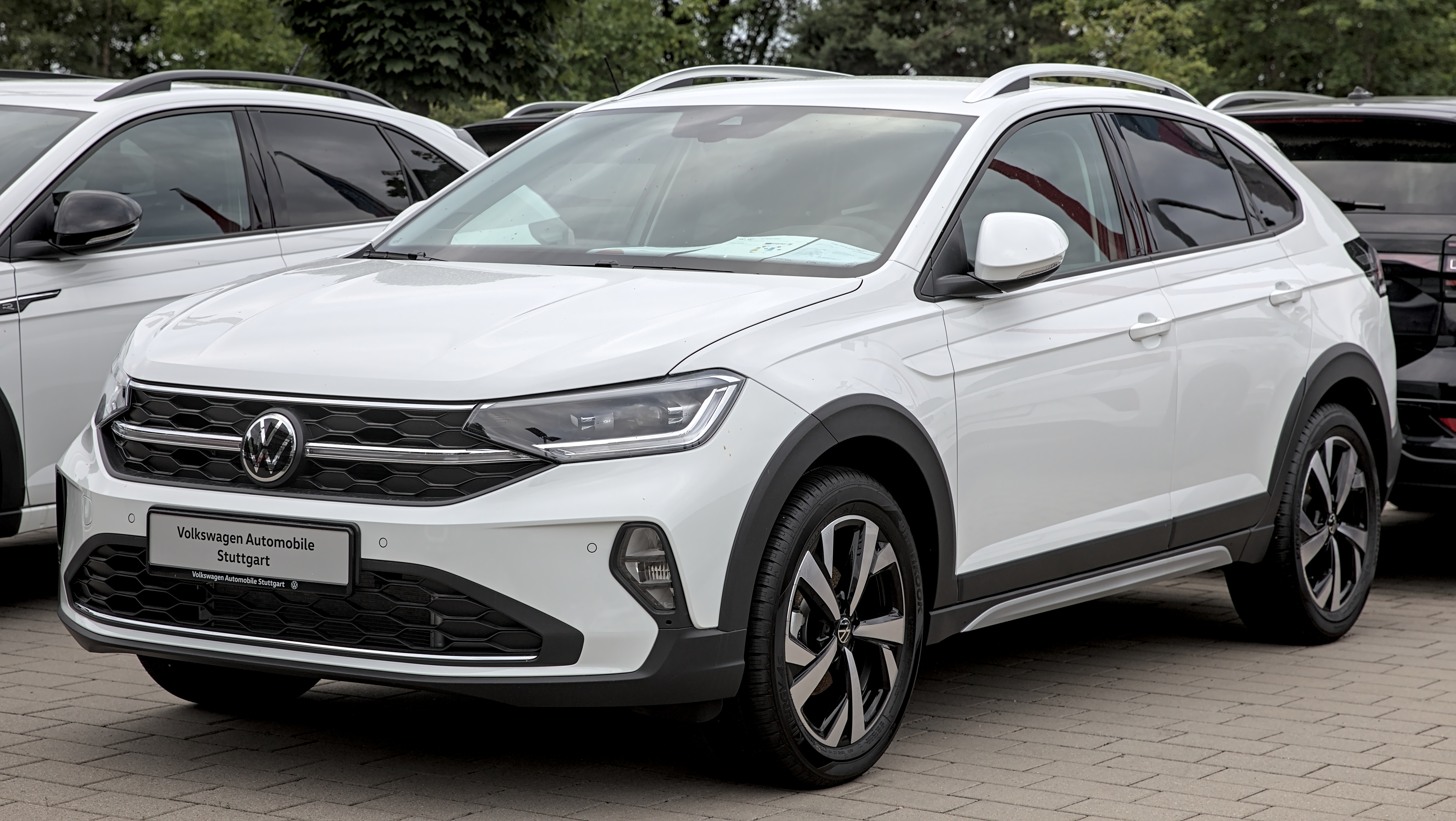
- 2022 Volkswagen Taigo

Overview
- Manufacturer: Volkswagen
- Model code: CS1
- Also called: Volkswagen Nivus (Latin America)
- Production: 2020–present
- Assembly: Spain: Pamplona (Volkswagen Navarra); Brazil: São Bernardo do Campo (Volkswagen do Brasil)
- Designer: José Carlos Pavone

Body and chassis
- Class: Subcompact crossover SUV (B)
- Body style: 5-door SUV
- Layout: Front-engine, front-wheel-drive
- Platform: Volkswagen Group MQB A0
- Related: Volkswagen Polo Mk6; Volkswagen Virtus; Volkswagen T-Cross; Volkswagen Tukan

Powertrain
- Engine: Petrol: 1.0 L TSI I3; 1.4 L TSI I4; 1.5 L TSI I4
- Transmission: 5-speed manual 6-speed manual 6-speed automatic 7-speed DSG

Dimensions
- Wheelbase: 2,566 mm (101.0 in)
- Length: 4,266–4,270 mm (168.0–168.1 in)
- Width: 1,750–1,757 mm (68.9–69.2 in)
- Height: 1,493 mm (58.8 in)
- Curb weight: 1,229–1,292 kg (2,709–2,848 lb)

The Volkswagen Taigo is a subcompact crossover SUV (B-segment) with a sloping roofline manufactured by the German automaker Volkswagen. Based on the Mk6 Polo, the Taigo is built on the Volkswagen Group MQB A0 platform.

The vehicle was first released as the Volkswagen Nivus, which was unveiled in May 2020 in Brazil. It has been launched in other South American markets in 2021, and was released in Europe in July 2021 as the Taigo. It is positioned alongside the T-Cross in the European market, and below the T-Cross in South America.

== Overview ==
Based on the Volkswagen Group MQB A0 platform, the Taigo/Nivus is closely related with the Mk6 Polo, sharing its side doors, windshield, roof stamping, suspension setup and most interior parts for efficiency and cost-cutting measures. While its fascia is completely redesigned, Volkswagen has also raised the hood which results in a taller presence and give it a more rugged look compared to the Polo. A completely new C-column stamping and the rear parts of the car allows for a larger trunk space, from 300 litres in the Polo to 415 litres. As the result, unlike other subcompact crossovers in the market, the Taigo/Nivus has a low-roof proportion that allows it to be marketed as a "coupe crossover" alternative to the tall-proportioned T-Cross. All-wheel drive is not available in any markets, as the MQB A0 platform did not support it.

The Taigo/Nivus is the first Volkswagen model developed in Brazil that is produced and sold in the European market. While the Nivus built in Brazil will be exported to markets in Latin America, the crossover went on production in the second half of 2021 in Pamplona, Spain as the Taigo.

According to Volkswagen do Brasil, about 30 people from the Spanish team were involved in the Taigo/Nivus project and some of them visited the facilities in Brazil to learn about the development vehicle before European production begins. Volkswagen claimed Taigo/Nivus was developed without any physical prototype needed, with designers and engineers using virtual reality and augmented reality instead. As a result, project time was reduced by 10 months with significant cost savings.

=== Taigo ===
The Taigo was released for the European market on 28 July 2021, a year after the debut of the Nivus. Manufactured at the Pamplona plant in Spain alongside the Polo and T-Cross, its design has largely carried over from the South American Nivus with several minor changes. An R-Line variant is available as the flagship model. VW stated that it is the "first SUV coupe to be launched in the (European) small car segment". The sleek roofline comes at the expense of boot space as the Taigo has a capacity of 438 litres, compared to 455 litres for the European T-Cross.

Available exclusively with front-wheel drive, two petrol engine options are at launch, including a 1.0-liter turbocharged three-cylinder TSI delivering 95 PS (70 kW; 94 hp) or 110 PS (81 kW; 108 hp), and a 1.5-liter turbocharged four-cylinder rated at 150 PS (110 kW; 148 hp). The 95 PS (70 kW; 94 hp) unit is paired to a standard 5-speed manual, with the 110 PS (81 kW; 108 hp) engine offering a choice of a six-speed manual or a seven-speed DSG dual clutch transmission.

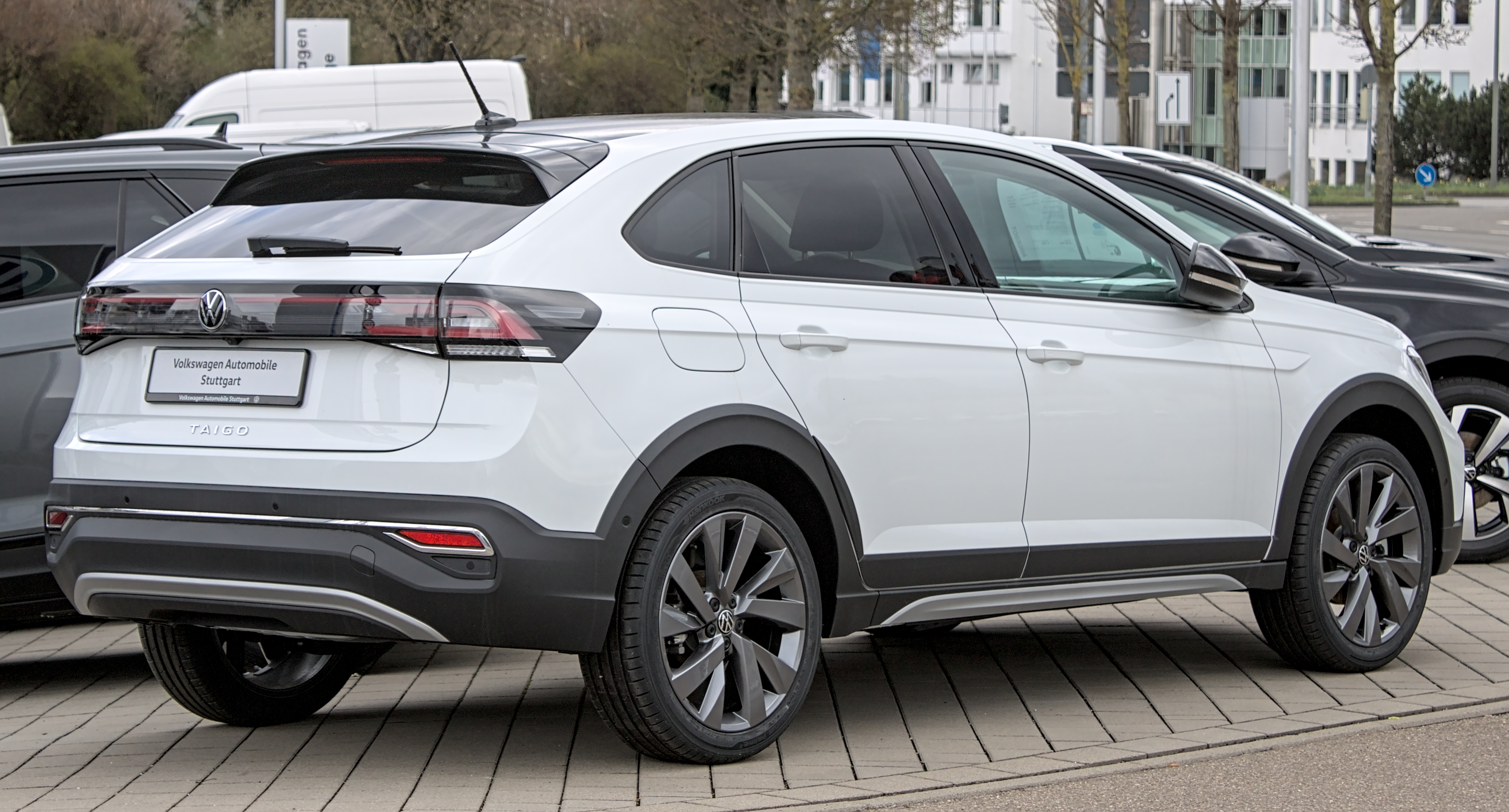
Rear view

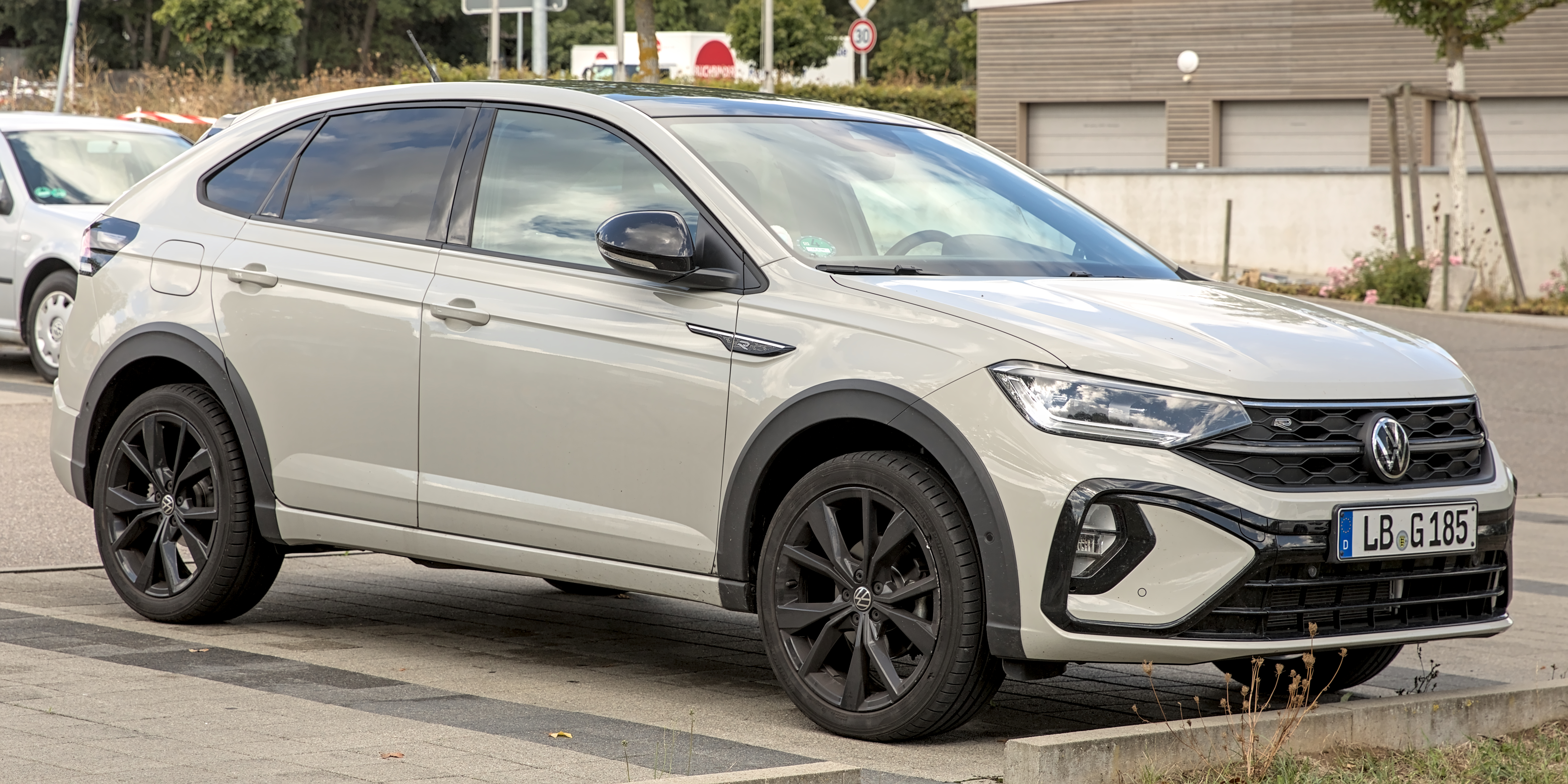
Taigo R-Line

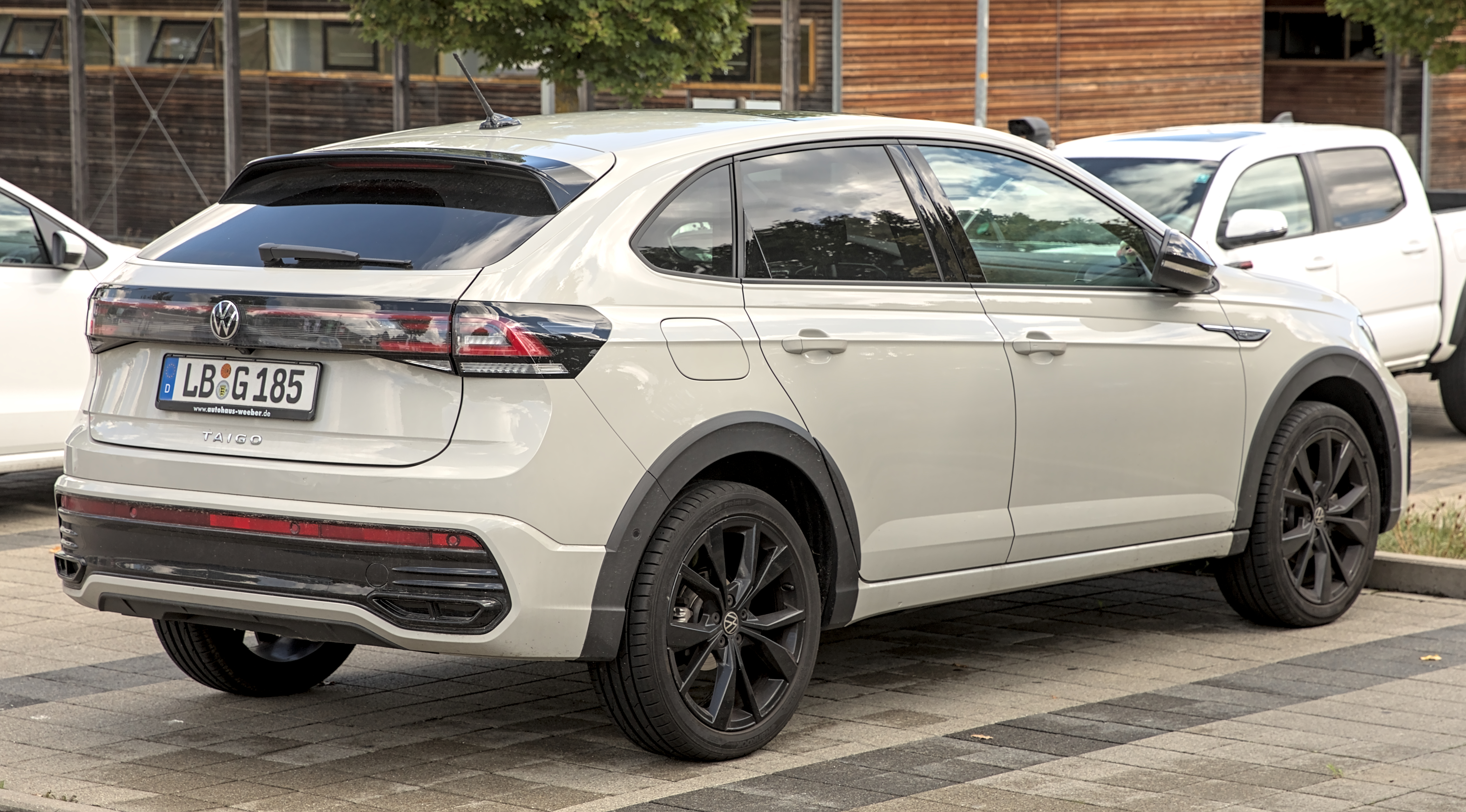
Rear view

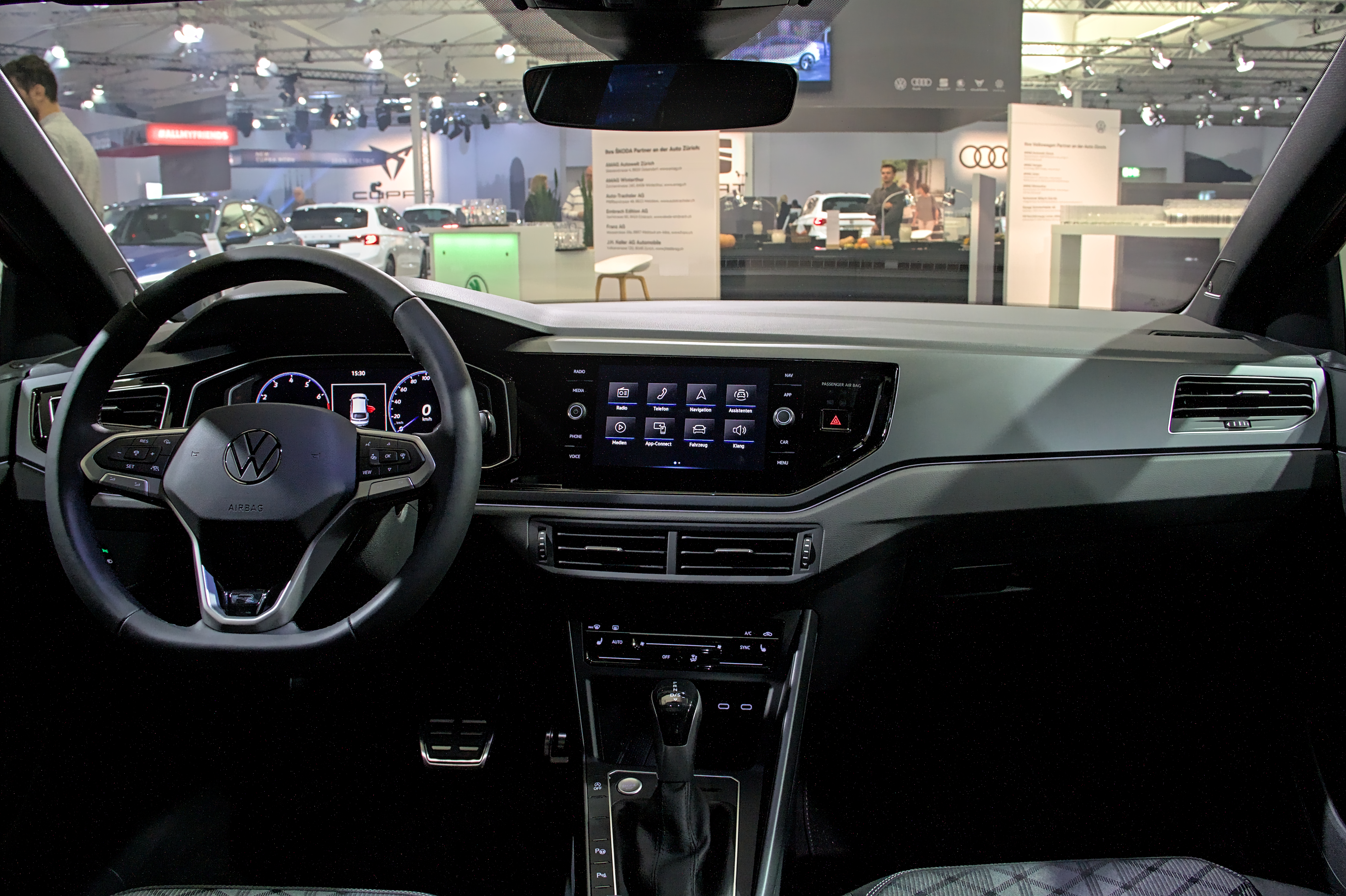
Interior

=== Nivus ===
Debuted on 28 May 2020 in Brazil, the Nivus is the second vehicle by Volkswagen to occupy the segment after the T-Cross. It is built at the Anchieta plant in São Bernardo do Campo, Brazil alongside the Polo and Virtus, with all three models sharing the MQB A0 platform. The Nivus is powered by a 1.0-liter TSI turbocharged three-cylinder petrol engine rated at 118 PS (87 kW; 116 hp). Badged 200 TSI, the unit runs also on ethanol, in which case it makes 130 PS (96 kW; 128 hp). The engine is hooked to a six-speed automatic transmission and front-wheel drive.

An export-only option is the 170 TSI, with a 95hp version of the same engine backed by a 5-speed manual transmission, available in countries such as Argentina and Uruguay where manual transmission remains more appreciated than in Brazil.

In the interior, the Nivus shared the same dashboard with the European Polo, with minimal differences, making it to look slightly different from the Latin American Polo. The infotainment system featured VW Play, which is a multimedia interface fully developed in Brazil.

The Nivus was released in Mexico in December 2021, being imported from Brazil.

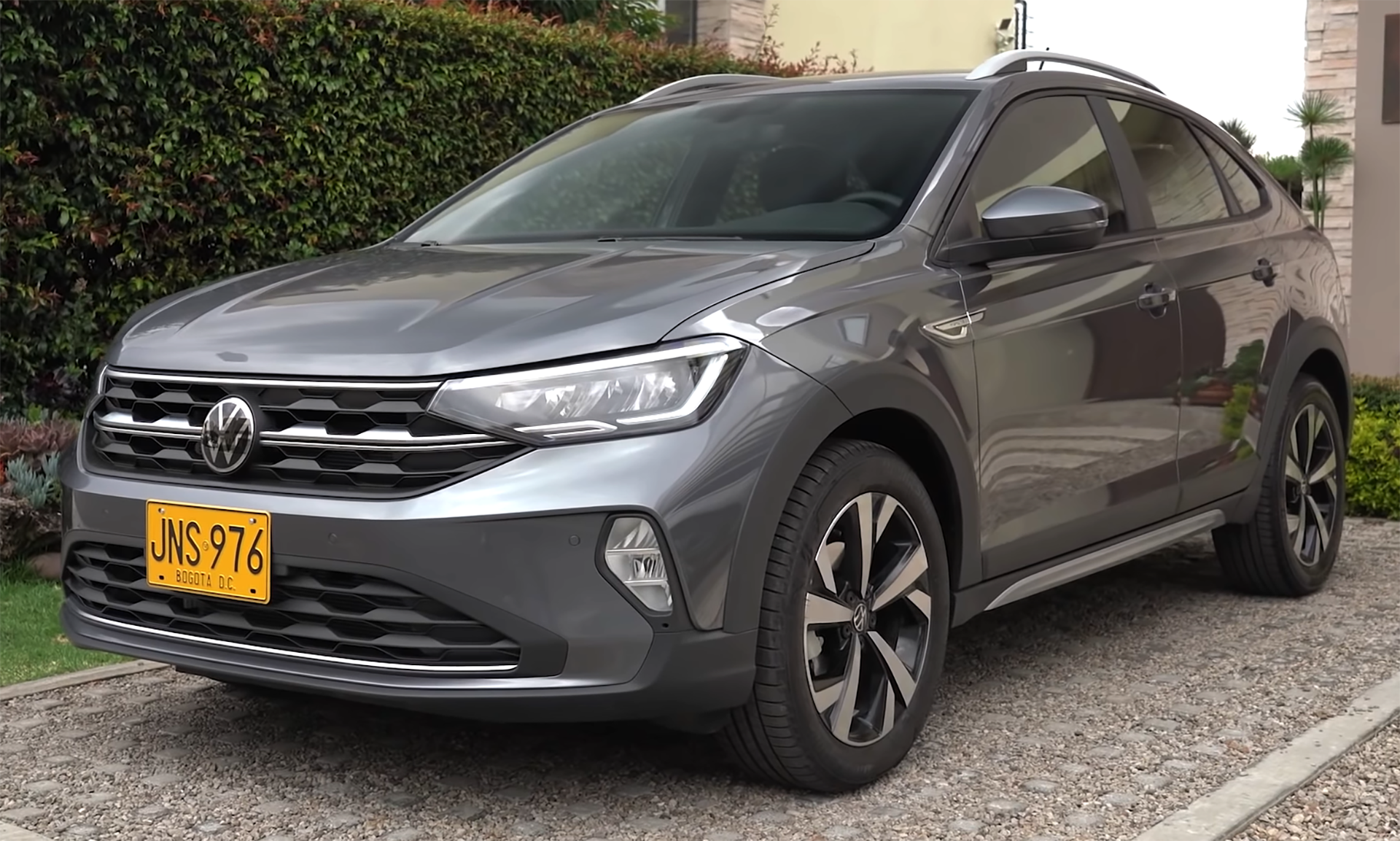
2021 Volkswagen Nivus Highline (Colombia)

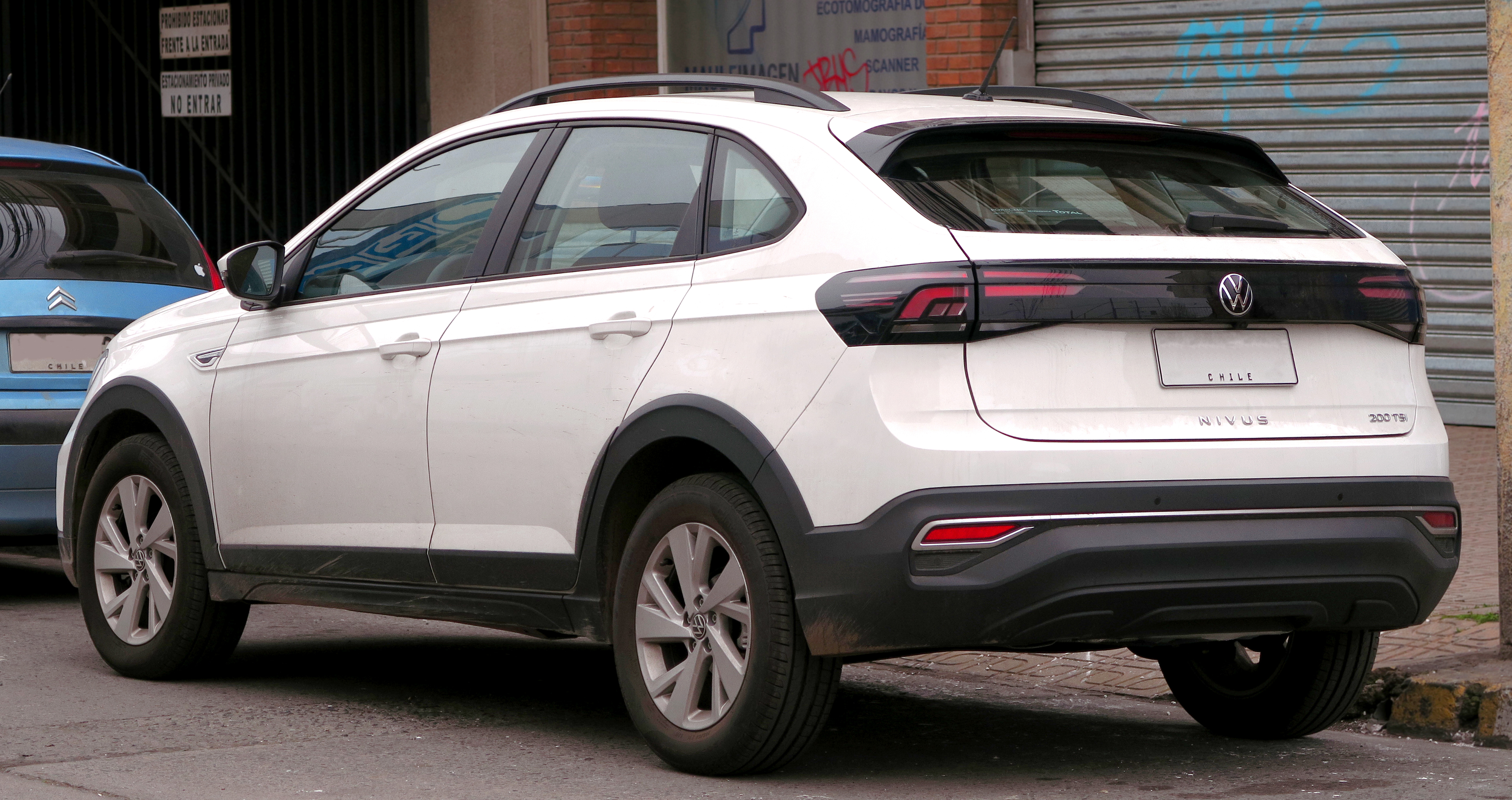
2021 Volkswagen Nivus Comfortline (Chile)

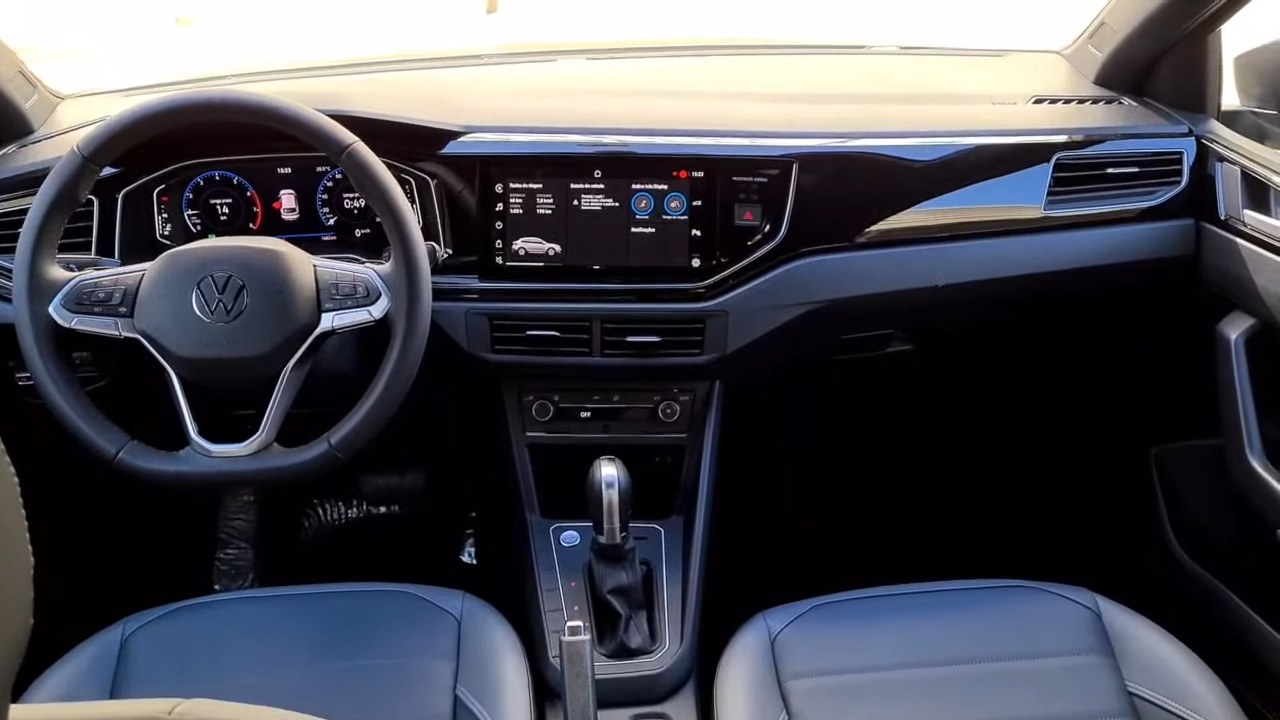
Interior

== Powertrain ==
Petrol engine
Model	Displacement	Series	Power	Torque	Transmission	Markets
1.0 TSI 95	999 cc I3	EA211	95 PS (70 kW; 94 hp)	175 N⋅m (129 lb⋅ft)	5-speed manual	Europe
1.0 TSI 110	999 cc I3	EA211	110 PS (81 kW; 108 hp)	200 N⋅m (148 lb⋅ft)	6-speed manual or 7-speed DSG	Europe
1.0 200 TSI	999 cc I3	EA211	118 PS (87 kW; 116 hp) (with petrol)	200 N⋅m (148 lb⋅ft)	6-speed automatic	South America
1.0 200 TSI	999 cc I3	EA211	130 PS (96 kW; 128 hp) (with ethanol)	200 N⋅m (148 lb⋅ft)	6-speed automatic	South America
1.5 TSI 150	1,498 cc I4	EA211	150 PS (110 kW; 148 hp)	250 N⋅m (184 lb⋅ft)	6-speed manual or 7-speed DSG	Europe

== Sales ==
Year	Brazil	Argentina	Uruguay	Mexico	Europe (Note: Europe: 2020 EU 27 + UK + Switzerland + Norway + Iceland)	Turkey
2020	16,242	1,149	60			
2021	36,669	5,459	734		1,688	
2022	39,407	4,237	943	3,203	66,698	6,149
2023	52,106	3,674	114	5,139		10,334
2024	55,922	6,424		2,596		14,115
2025	48,763	10,854				21,367

== Safety ==
Rear disc brakes are optional in the Nivus.

=== Latin NCAP ===
The Latin American Nivus with 6 airbags, airbag switch, UN127, ESC, ISA, full SBR and optional collision avoidance system received 5 stars from Latin NCAP 3.0 in 2022 (similar to Euro NCAP 2014).

Latin NCAP 3.0 test results Volkswagen Nivus + 6 Airbags (2022, similar to Euro NCAP 2014)
Test	Points	%
Overall:	5 /5 stars	
Adult occupant:	36.99	92%
Child occupant:	44.87	92%
Pedestrian:	23.40	49%
Safety assist:	36.53	85%

=== Euro NCAP ===
The Taigo was tested by Euro NCAP in 2022 as a partner model to the Polo and achieved the maximum five-star safety rating.
