= Volkswagen T-Cross =

Subcompact crossover SUV

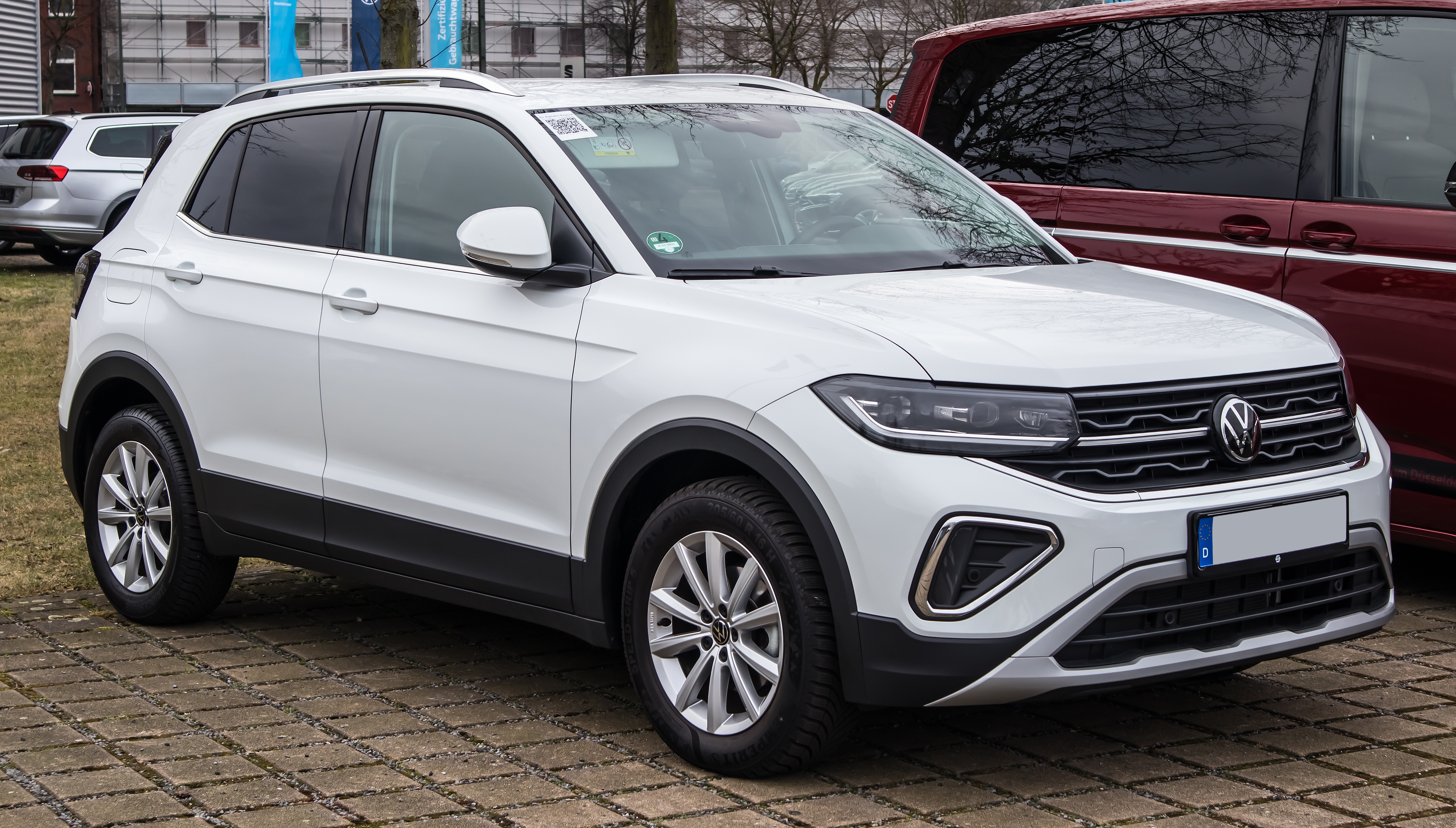

Overview
- Manufacturer: Volkswagen
- Model code: C11
- Also called: Volkswagen Tacqua (China, FAW-VW); Volkswagen Taigun (India and Mexico); Volkswagen Tharu XR (China, 2024–present)
- Production: December 2018 – present
- Assembly: Spain: Pamplona (Volkswagen Navarra); Brazil: São José dos Pinhais (Volkswagen do Brasil); China: Anting, Shanghai (SAIC-VW, T-Cross / Tharu XR); Changchun, Jilin (FAW-VW, Tacqua); India: Chakan (Škoda VW India)

Body and chassis
- Class: Subcompact crossover SUV (B)
- Body style: 5-door SUV
- Layout: Front-engine, front-wheel-drive
- Platform: Volkswagen Group MQB A0
- Related: Škoda Kushaq; Škoda Kylaq; Volkswagen Polo Mk6; Volkswagen Virtus; Volkswagen Taigo/Nivus; Volkswagen Tukan; SEAT Arona; Škoda Kamiq; Audi A1

Powertrain
- Engine: Petrol: 1.0 L TSI I3; 1.4 L TSI I4; 1.5 L MPI I4; 1.5 L TSI I4; 1.6 L MSI I4; Diesel: 1.6 L TDI I4
- Transmission: 5-speed manual 6-speed manual 6-speed automatic 7-speed DSG

Dimensions
- Wheelbase: 2,551 mm (100.4 in); 2,650 mm (104.3 in) (LWB models)
- Length: 4,108 mm (161.7 in); 4,199–4,218 mm (165.3–166.1 in) (LWB models); 4,355 mm (171.5 in) (Tharu XR)
- Width: 1,760 mm (69.3 in)
- Height: 1,583–1,589 mm (62.3–62.6 in); 1,605 mm (63.2 in) (Tharu XR)
- Curb weight: 1,245–1,390 kg (2,745–3,064 lb)

The Volkswagen T-Cross is a subcompact crossover SUV (B-segment) manufactured by the German automaker Volkswagen. It is based on the MQB A0 platform shared with the Polo Mk6, and was officially launched in April 2019. It is positioned below the T-Roc and alongside the Taigo/Nivus.

== Overview ==
The T-Cross started as a replacement for a cancelled project of a small SUV based on the Volkswagen Taigun concept which was showcased in São Paulo in 2012. It is an SUV based on the Volkswagen Up! with a length of under 3.9 m destined for Europe, Brazil and India, and was planned to be on sale in 2016 after the project was green-lit in 2012. In 2016, Volkswagen cancelled the plan of producing the Taigun after an internal study concluded that its dimension was too small. Volkswagen shifted its focus onto developing a Polo-based small SUV instead, which eventually spawned the T-Cross. The Taigun nameplate is being reused as a rebadged long-wheelbase T-Cross for the Indian market.

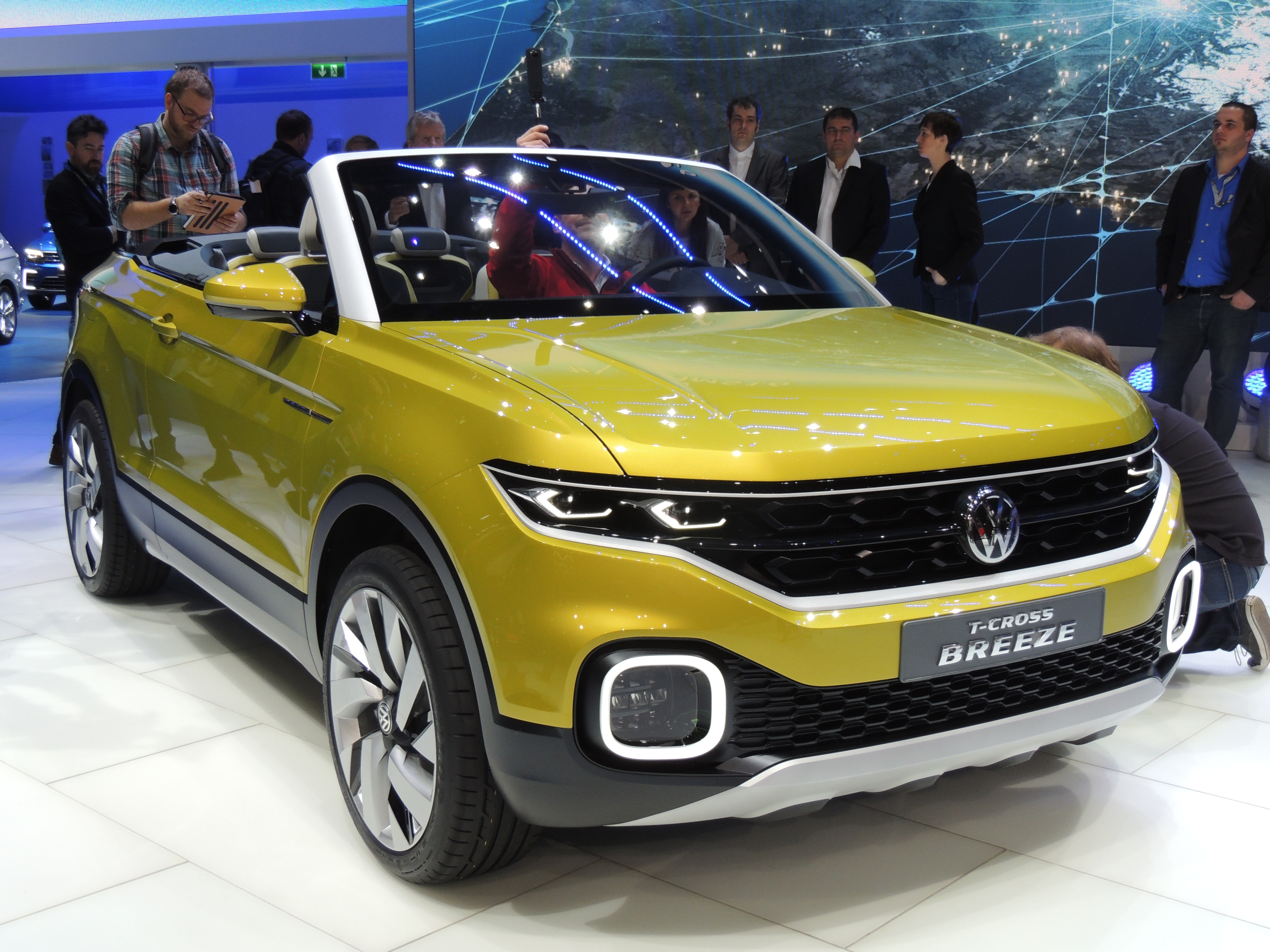
Volkswagen T-Cross Breeze concept

In 2016, the T-Cross was previewed as a concept car called the VW T-Cross Breeze at the Geneva Motor Show. This vehicle was, in contrast to the production version, a four-seater convertible with a fabric top. The T-Cross Breeze was 4.13 metres (162.6 in) long, 1.80 metres (70.9 in) wide and 1.56 metres (61.4 in) high. The concept vehicle was powered by a 1.0-litre TSI engine with 81 kW (109 hp) and 175 N⋅m (129 lbf⋅ft) of torque.

The production version of the T-Cross was officially launched on 25 October 2018 simultaneously in three cities located in three continents – Amsterdam, Shanghai and São Paulo – demonstrating T-Cross's nature as a global product. The model is produced in China and Brazil with a modified length of 4.2 m and a longer wheelbase of 2.65 m shared with the Škoda Kamiq and Volkswagen Virtus, with the goal of improving interior space. These models also have different front fascias and steering wheels from the variant sold in Europe.

== Markets ==
=== Europe ===
Debuted in Amsterdam, the T-Cross is positioned below the T-Roc in Volkswagen Europe SUV line-up and acts as an entry-level model. The vehicle is built together with the Volkswagen Polo at Volkswagen Navarra S.A. in Pamplona, Spain.

Although the T-Cross is only slightly smaller than the Golf-based T-Roc, VW is marketing the T-Cross as the more practical and family-oriented car, as Volkswagen expects the T-Cross to appeal to young families and older demographics due to its tall roof and its high driving position.

Four engines have been announced for the launch model, and only one of them is a diesel, which is 1.6-litre TDI four-cylinder unit with 95 PS (94 hp; 70 kW). There are two versions of the 1.0-litre TSI turbo petrol three-cylinder, with either 95 PS (94 hp; 70 kW) or 115 PS (113 hp; 85 kW), and a range-topping 1.5-litre TSI petrol with 150 PS (148 hp; 110 kW). It is available with a 5- or 6-speed manual, and a 7-speed DSG transmission. All T-Cross variants are front-wheel drive as its Polo-sourced underpinnings do not support an all-wheel drive configuration. It was delivered to the customers in April 2019.

The T-Cross went on sale in Turkey in March 2022.

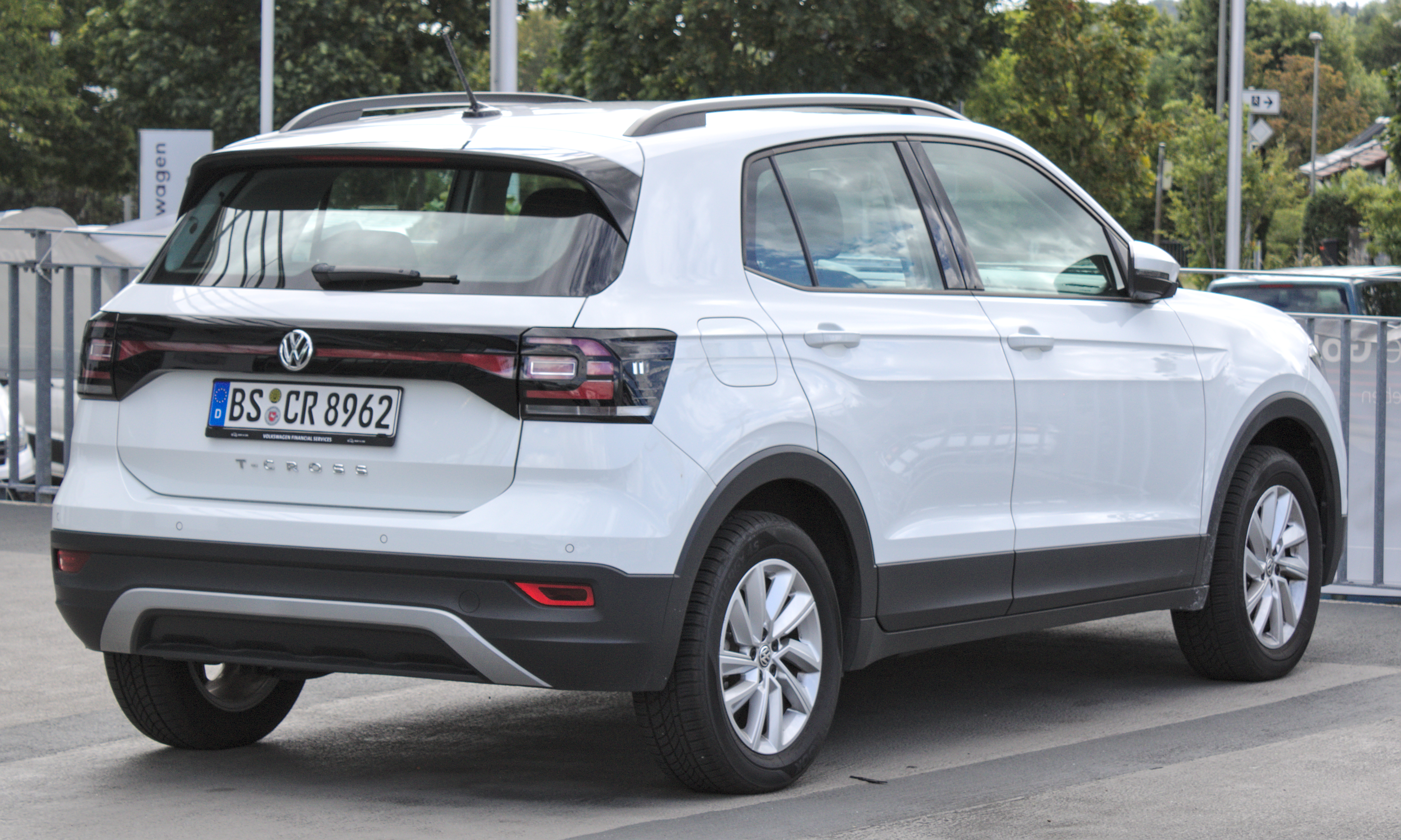
Rear view

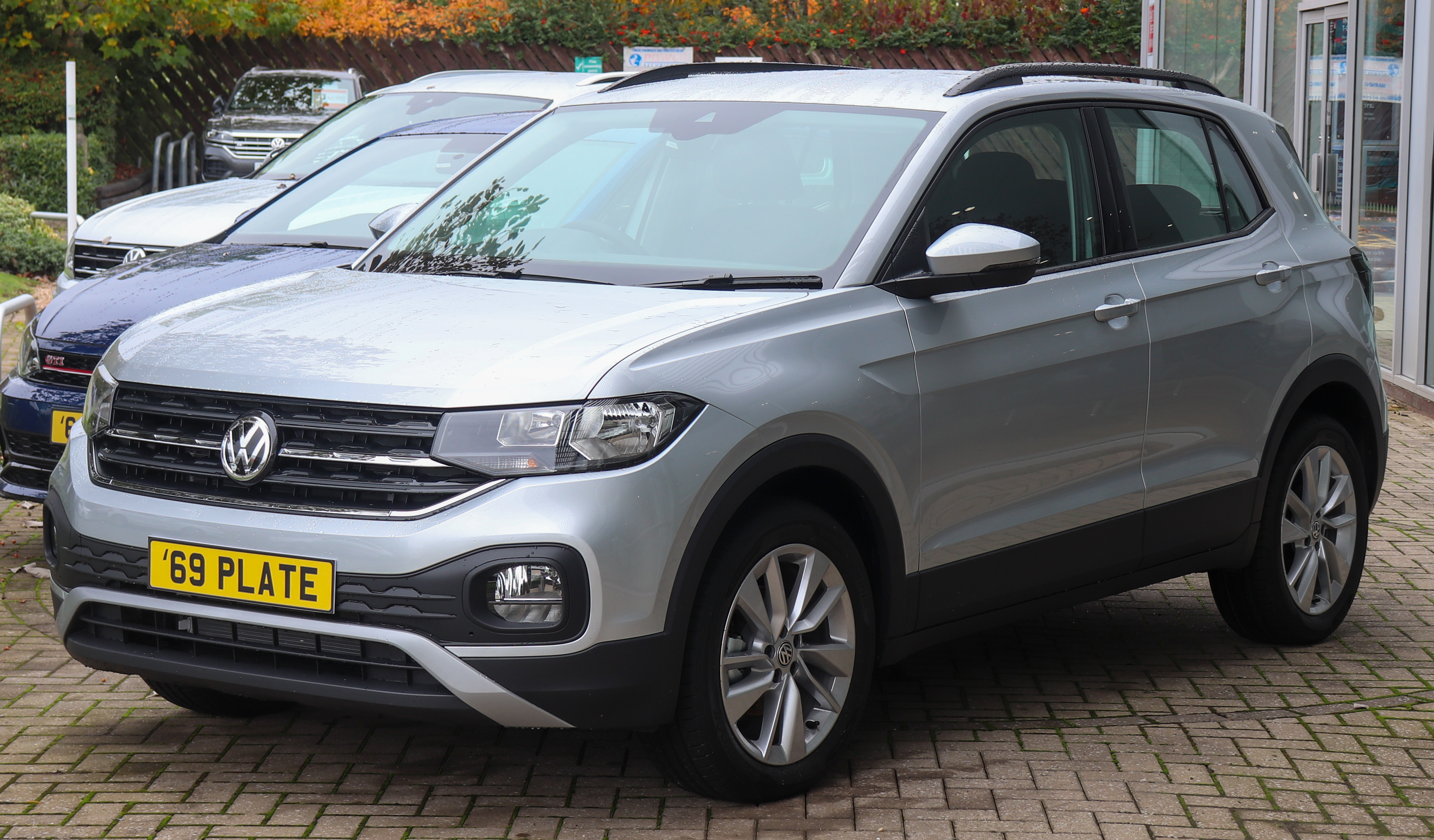
Volkswagen T-Cross SE

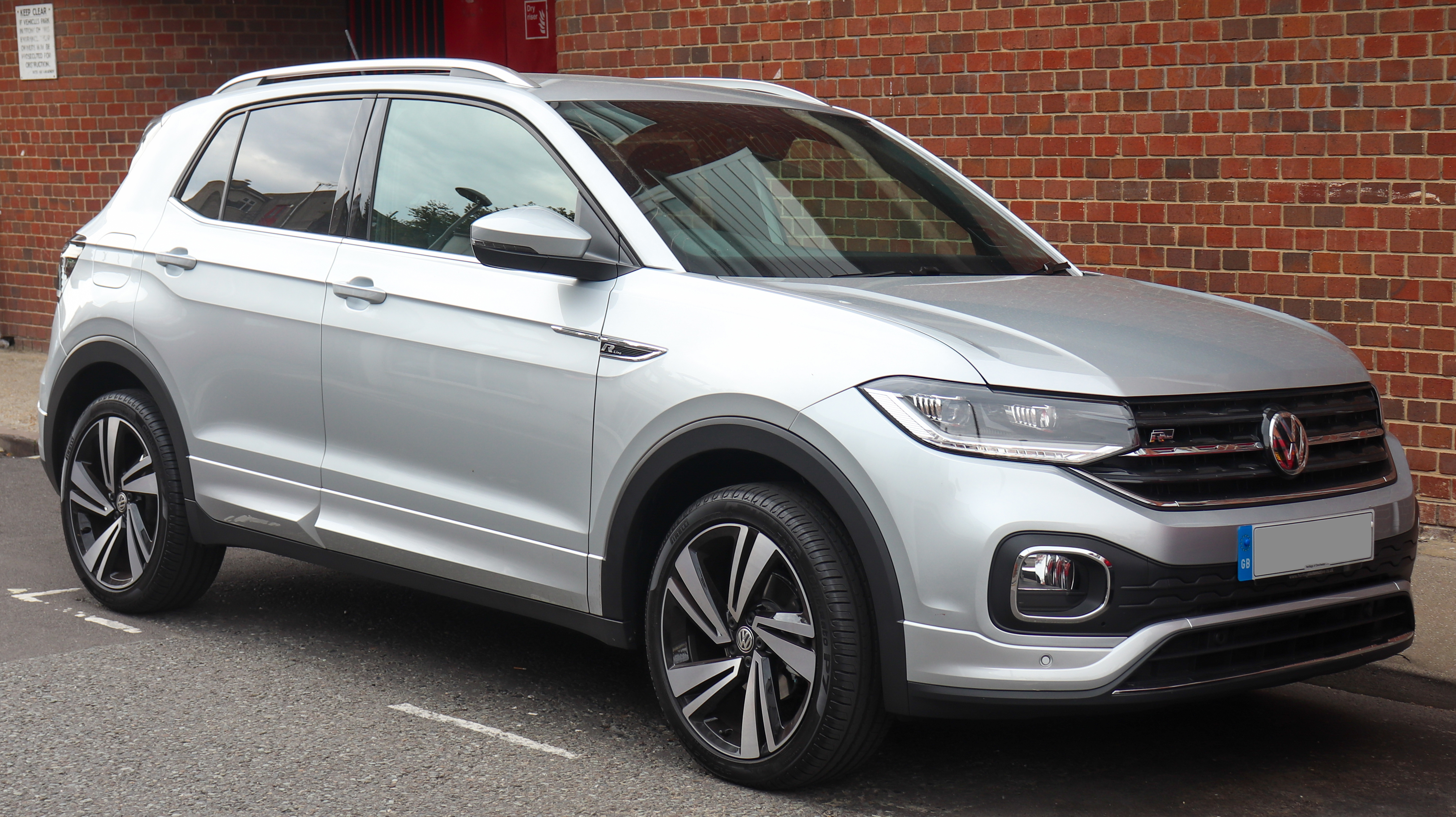
Volkswagen T-Cross R-Line

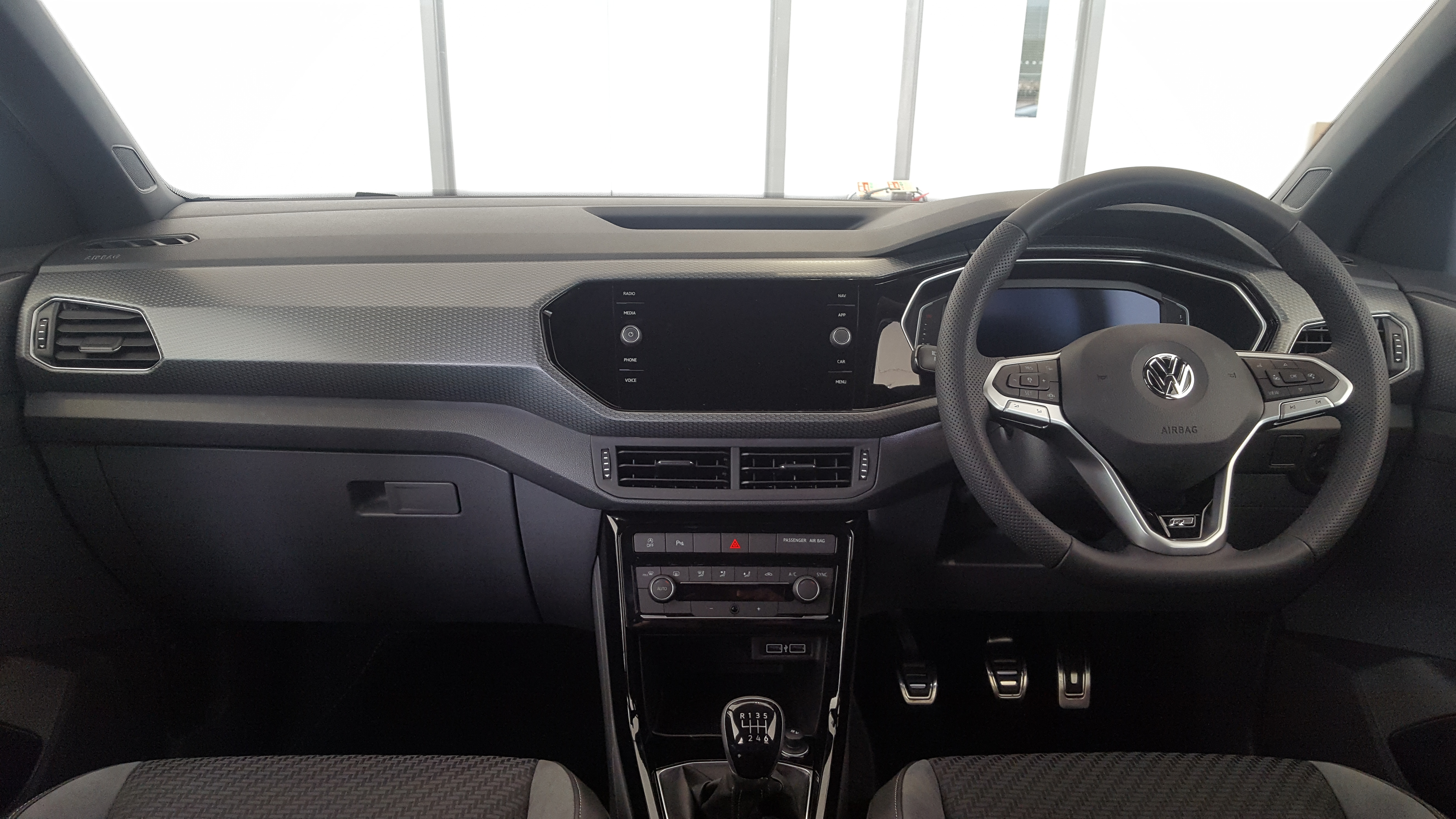
Interior

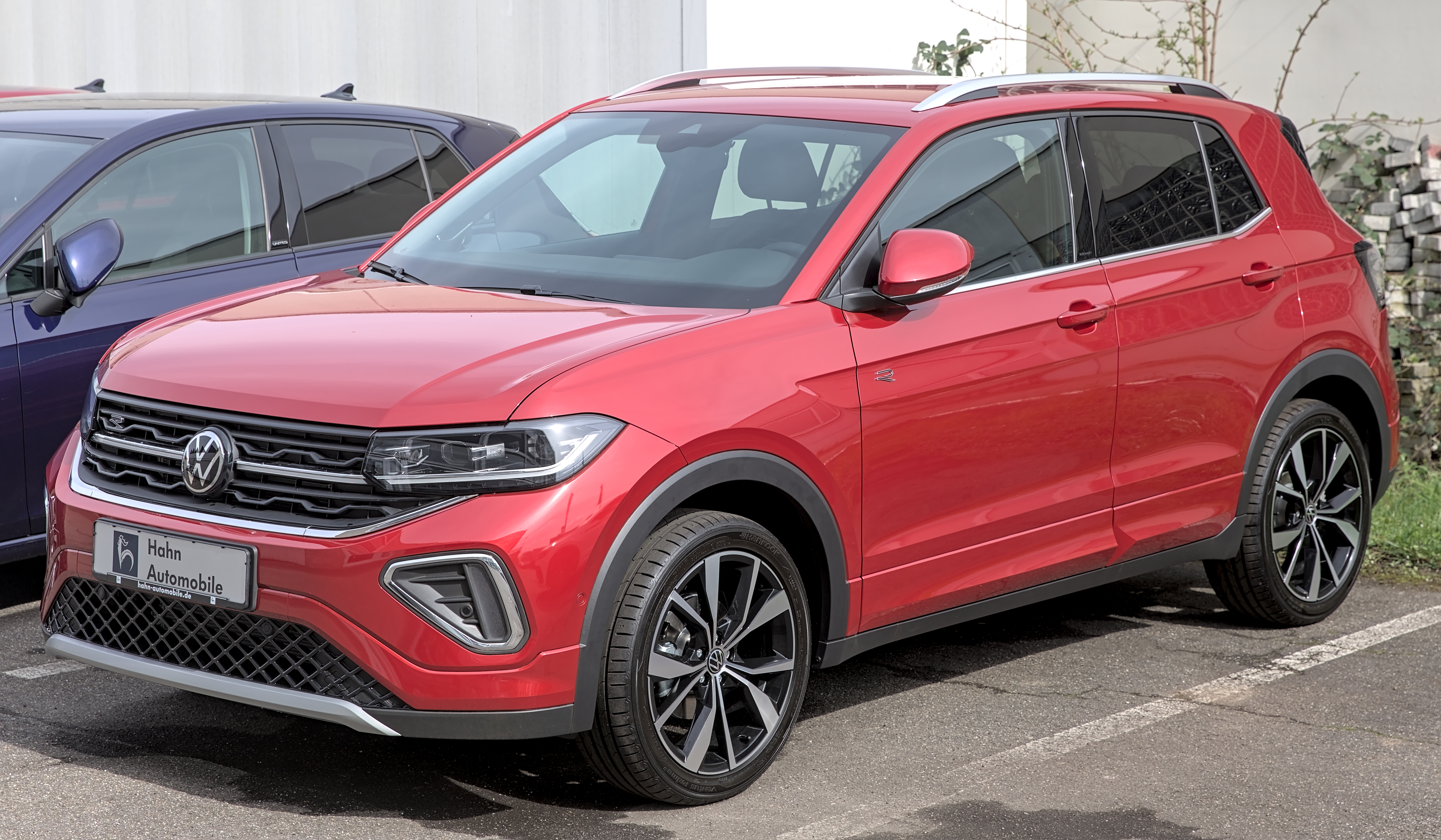
2023 facelift

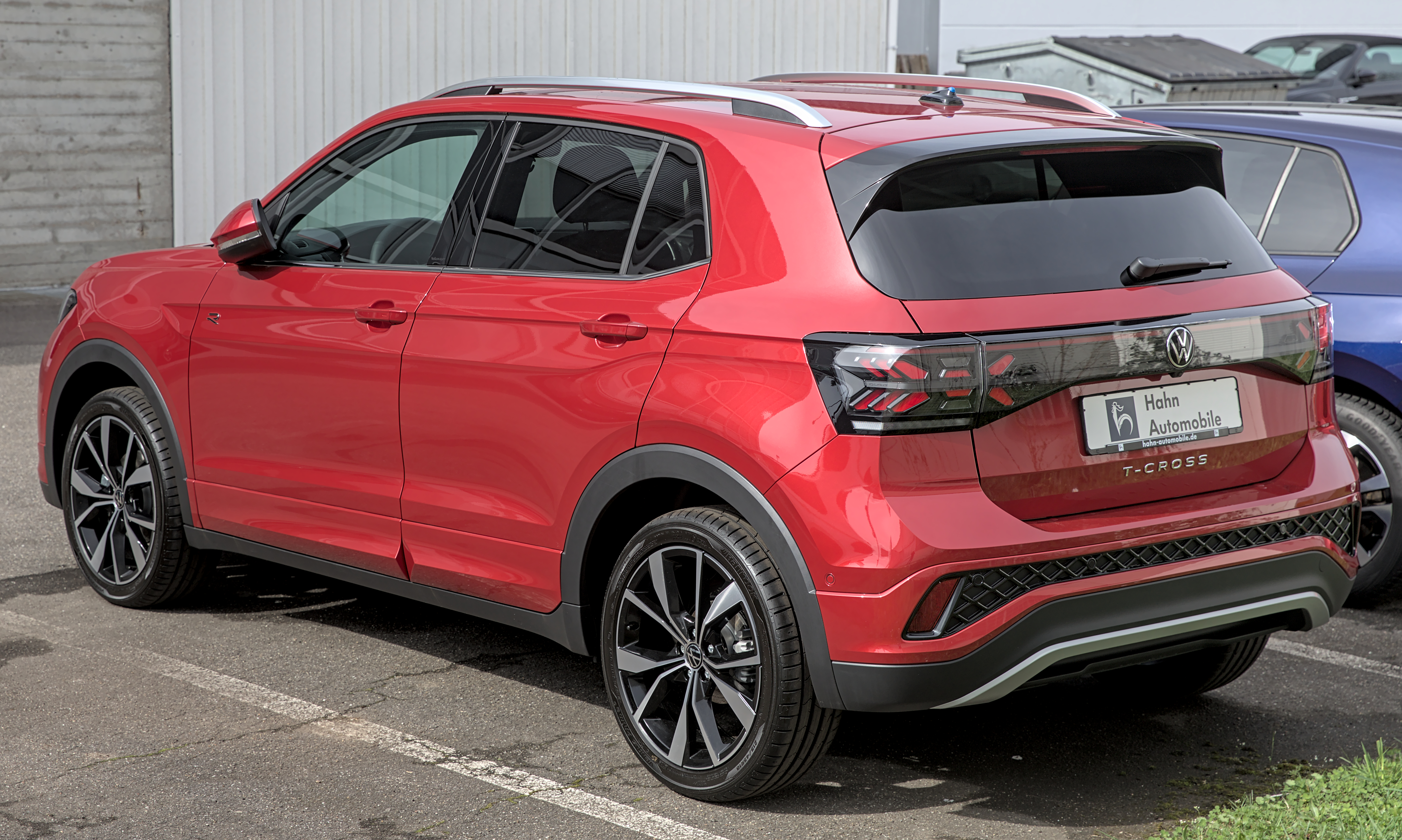
2023 facelift

==== T-Cross First Edition ====
First-edition models are based on a T-Cross style 1.0-litre TSI with 115 PS (113 hp; 85 kW). It is available in 150 and 50 units in manual and dual-clutch gearboxes respectively, which were available as part of a lottery.

==== Powertrain ====
Petrol engines
Model	Displacement	Power	Torque	Transmission
1.0 TSI 95	999 cc I3	95 PS (70 kW; 94 hp)	175 N⋅m (129 lb⋅ft)	5-speed manual
1.0 TSI 115	999 cc I3	115 PS (85 kW; 113 hp)	200 N⋅m (148 lb⋅ft)	6-speed manual or 7-speed DSG
1.5 TSI 150	1,498 cc I4	150 PS (110 kW; 148 hp)	250 N⋅m (184 lb⋅ft)	6-speed manual or 7-speed DSG
Diesel engine
1.6 TDI 95	1,598 cc I4	95 PS (70 kW; 94 hp)	250 N⋅m (184 lb⋅ft)	5-speed manual or 7-speed DSG

=== Latin America ===
==== Argentina ====
The T-Cross was launched in Argentina on 27 June 2019, it is currently imported from Brazil (May 28 2026), it has five trim levels: Sense, Trendline, Comfortline, Highline and Extreme.

==== Brazil ====
Unveiled on 25 October 2018 and sold from April 2019, the T-Cross built in São José dos Pinhais plant in Brazil is a long-wheelbase version one, sharing the 2.65 m wheelbase with the Virtus which stretches its length to 4.19 m while keeping it on the MQB A0 platform.

The Latin American T-Cross is available with several engine options, including 1.0-litre TSI making 128 hp (130 PS; 95 kW) used in the Brazil-made Polo and Virtus serving as an entry option, while the high-end trims is equipped with 1.4-litre TSI engine capable of 150 hp (152 PS; 112 kW) produced in São Carlos, São Paulo. The São José dos Pinhais plant will also manufacture the T-Cross with 1.6-litre MSI engine with 110 hp (112 PS; 82 kW) of power output dedicated for exports to other Latin American countries and LHD African countries. It is available with a 6-speed manual transmission for the lowest trim, while the other trims solely available with a 6-speed torque converter automatic transmission. The Brazilian-made T-Cross used torsion beam for the rear suspension, sharing its suspension configuration with the Virtus with specific calibrations for an SUV model.

While the Brazilian-made T-Cross has a longer wheelbase compared to the European version, the engineering team focused on making a larger space and legroom for the second row passengers. As the result, the capacity of the boot was reduced. While the European T-Cross carries between 385 and 455 litres (rear seats unfolded, depends on the rear seat recline position), the Brazilian model is only capable of 373–420 litres. This is also the case for the Chinese T-Cross and Tacqua, being the long-wheelbase version of the T-Cross.

In February 2025, the T-Cross reached the 500,000th unit produced in Brazil.

==== Mexico ====
The T-Cross was introduced in Mexico in September 2019 and was imported from Brazil. It uses a 1.6-litre engine coupled with the Tiptronic six speed automatic transmission. It is the second car in Volkswagen's Mexican lineup to use the MQB A0 platform. It also comes with a 6.5" Composition Media and Apple CarPlay infotainment system, six airbags, ABS brakes and electronic stability control, and automatic post collision braking is available in all versions. It obtained a five star rating by Latin NCAP. It arrived to the market in Mexico in 2019.

The Brazilian-made T-Cross was briefly sold alongside the Indian-made Taigun, which went on sale in February 2023. The Taigun replaced the T-Cross in the market.

==== Powertrain ====
Petrol engines
Model	Displacement	Power	Torque	Transmission
1.0 200 TSI	999 cc I3	118 PS (87 kW; 116 hp) (with petrol)	200 N⋅m (148 lb⋅ft)	6-speed manual or 6-speed automatic
1.0 200 TSI	999 cc I3	130 PS (96 kW; 128 hp) (with ethanol)	200 N⋅m (148 lb⋅ft)	6-speed manual or 6-speed automatic
1.5 250 TSI	1,498 cc I4	152 PS (112 kW; 150 hp)	250 N⋅m (184 lb⋅ft)	6-speed automatic
1.6 MSI	1,598 cc I4	112 PS (82 kW; 110 hp)	155 N⋅m (114 lb⋅ft)	5-speed manual or 6-speed automatic

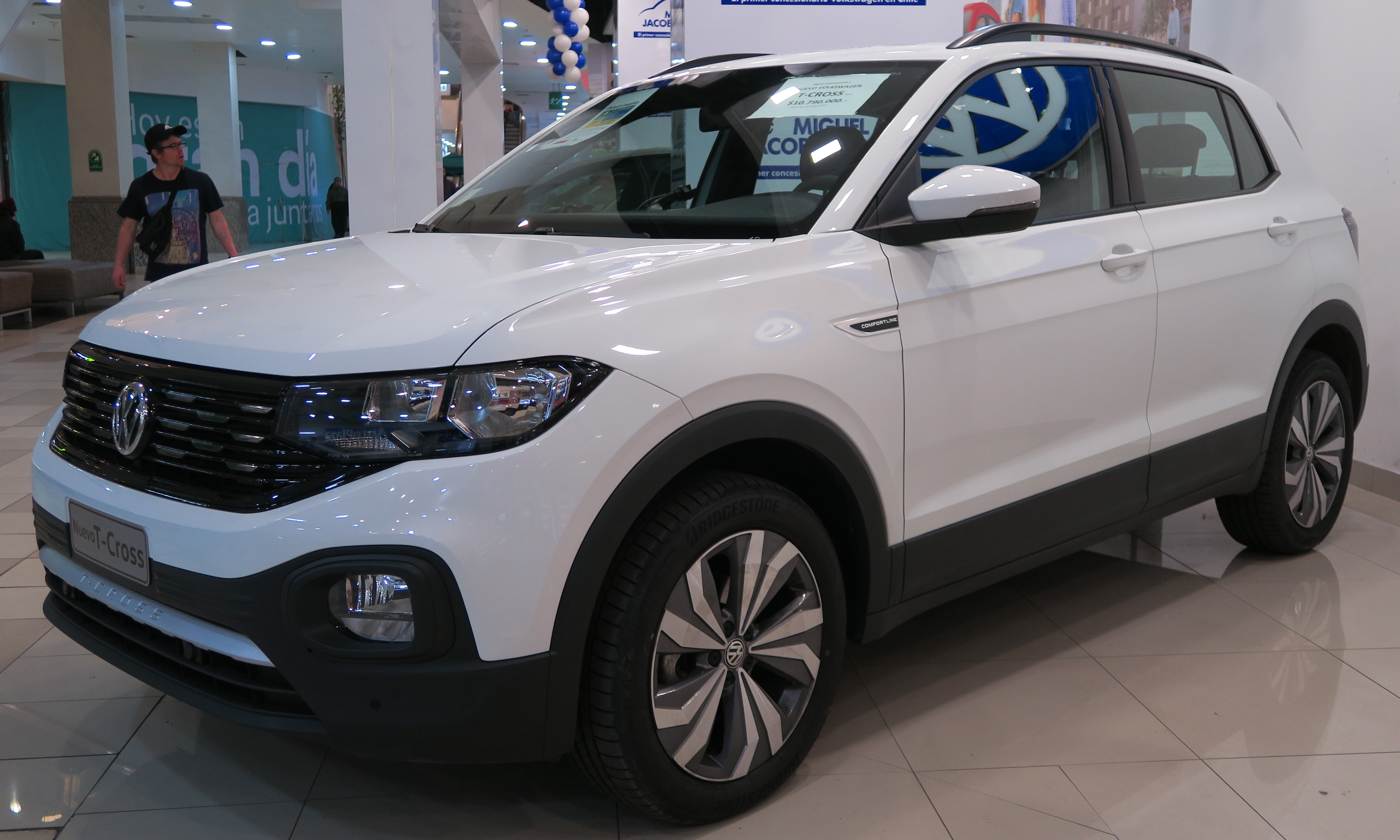
Volkswagen T-Cross (Chile)

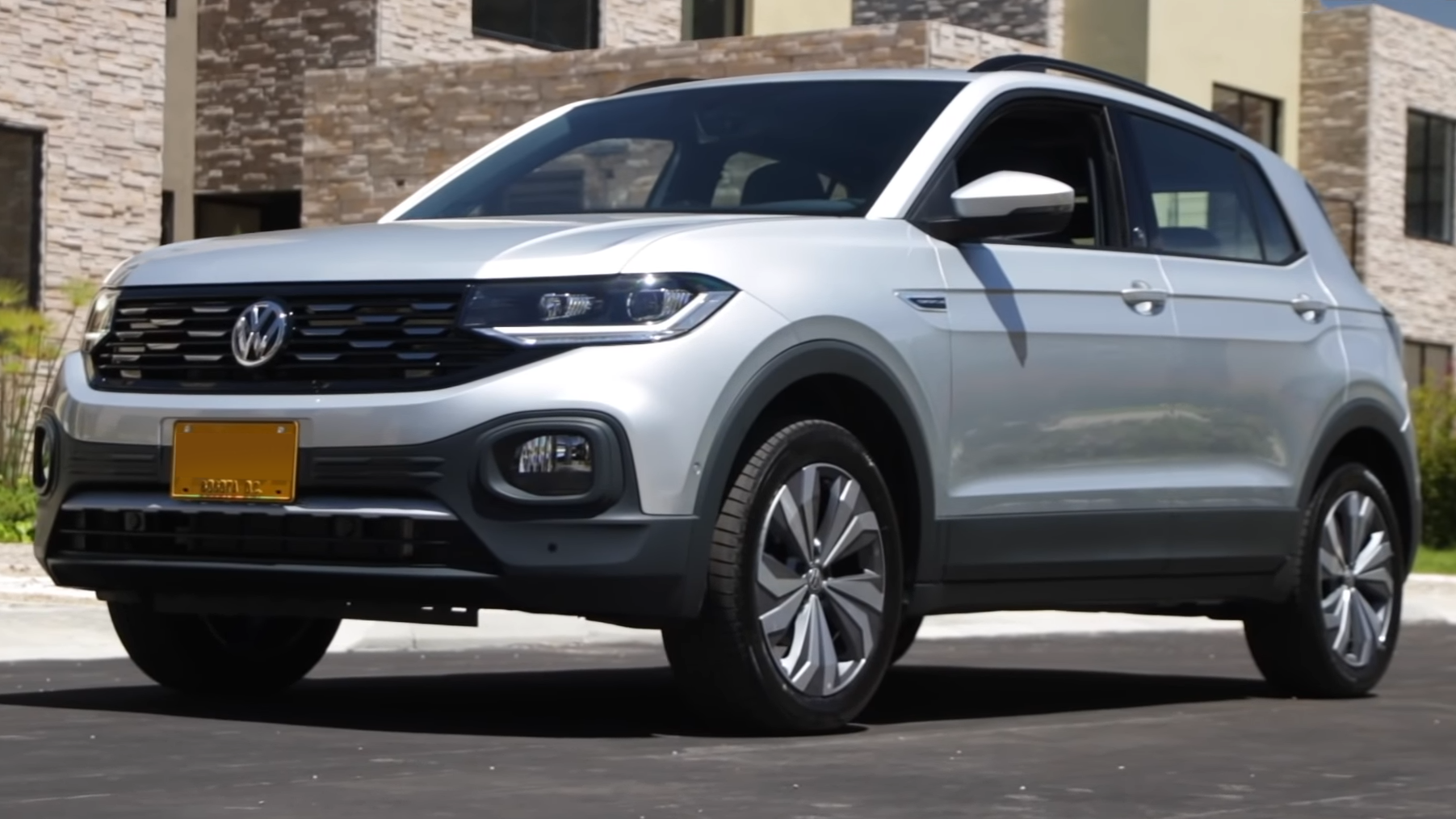
Volkswagen T-Cross (Colombia)

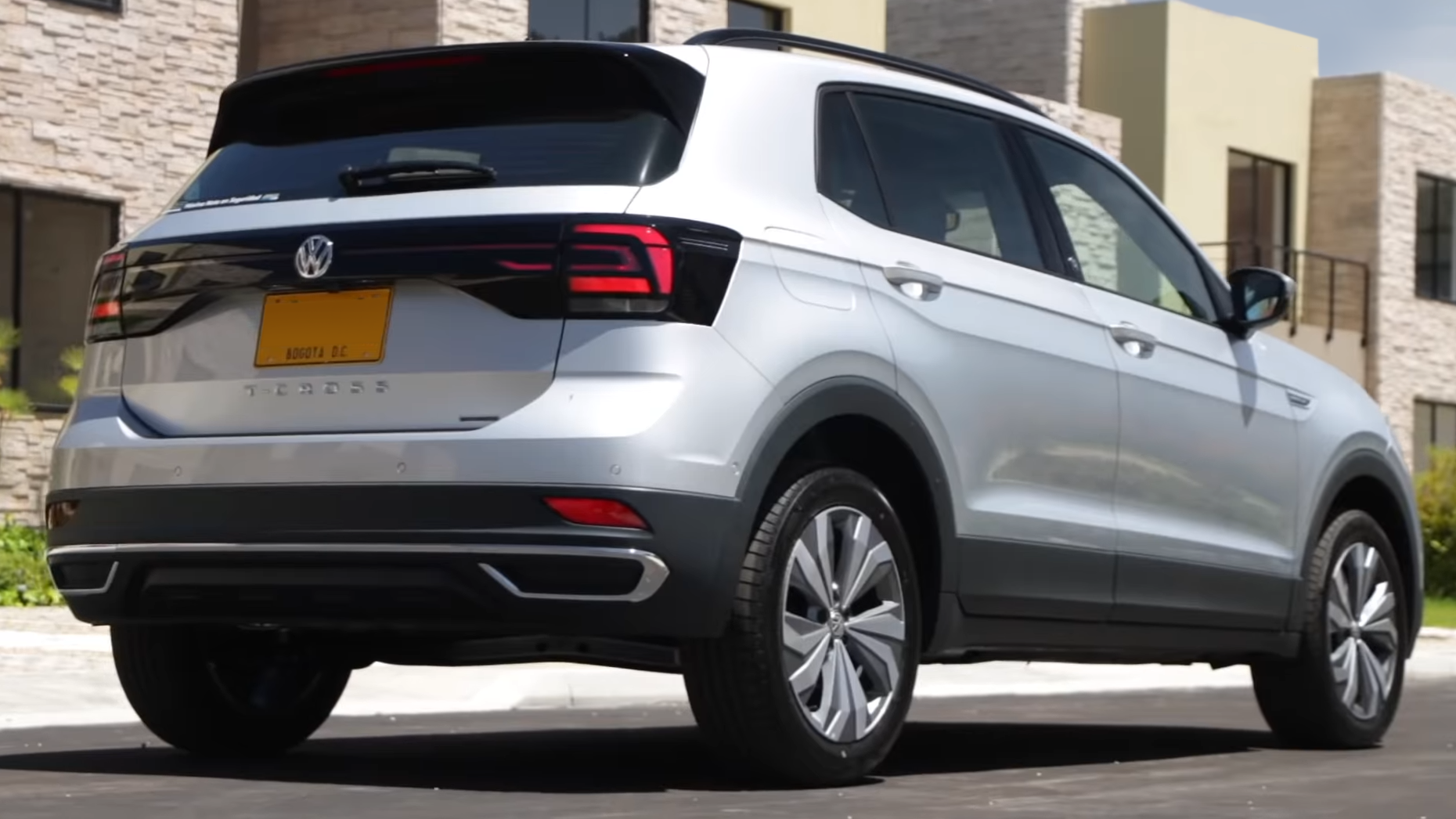
Volkswagen T-Cross (Colombia)

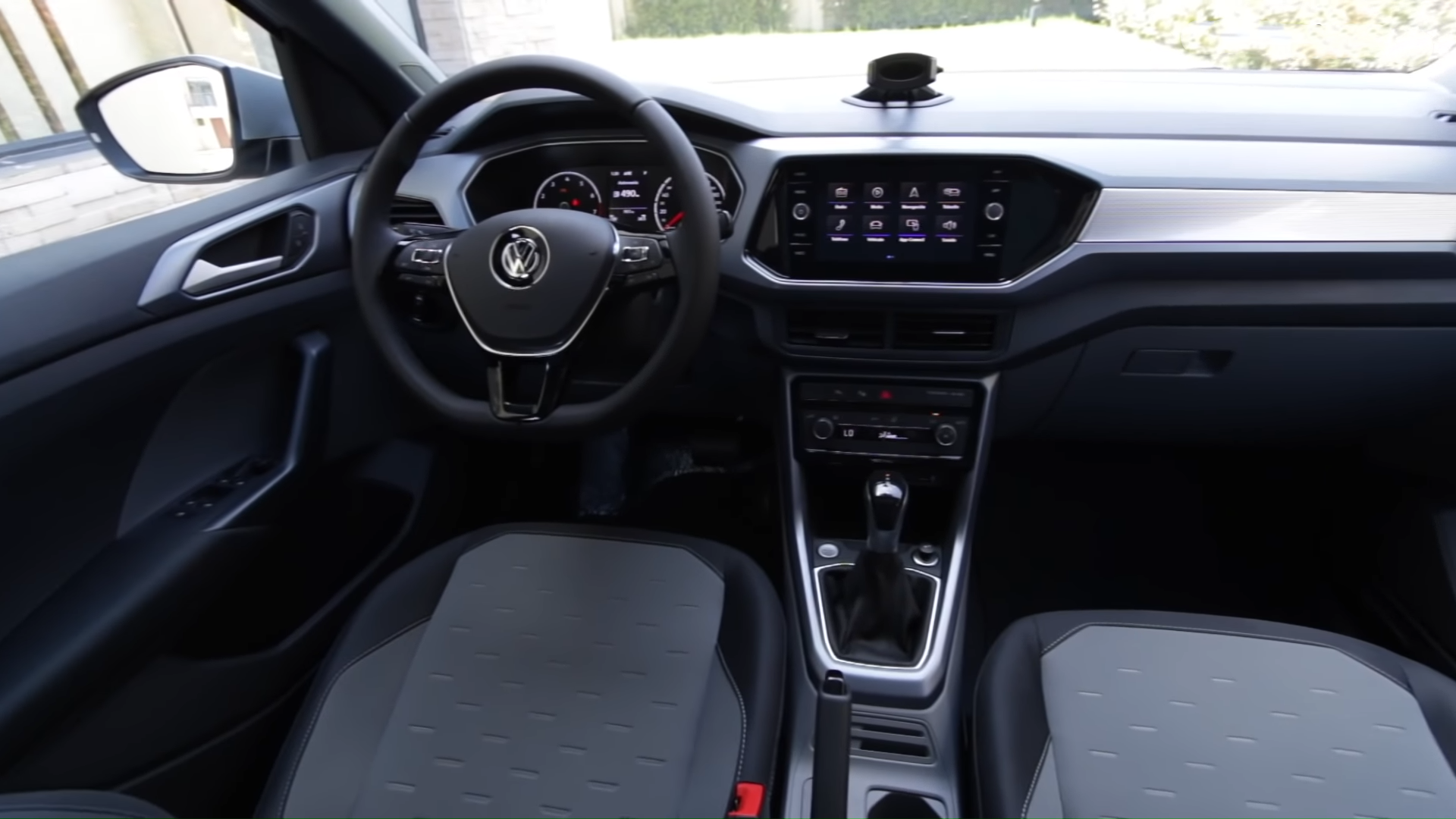
Interior (Colombia)

=== China ===
In China, the car is offered by two manufacturers (SAIC-Volkswagen and FAW-Volkswagen) with three different names, which are the T-Cross, Tharu XR and Tacqua respectively.

==== T-Cross ====
The Chinese market T-Cross (Chinese: 途铠; pinyin: tú kǎi) was unveiled on 25 October 2018. It is manufactured and marketed by SAIC-VW and adopted the long-wheelbase body like the Brazilian T-Cross. It features a different front and rear bumpers to adapt with the Chinese market taste and trends. It is available in two engine options, which include 1.4-litre TSI which makes 148 hp (150 PS; 110 kW) and 1.5-litre MPI with 113 hp (115 PS; 84 kW) of power output. It went on sale in April 2019.

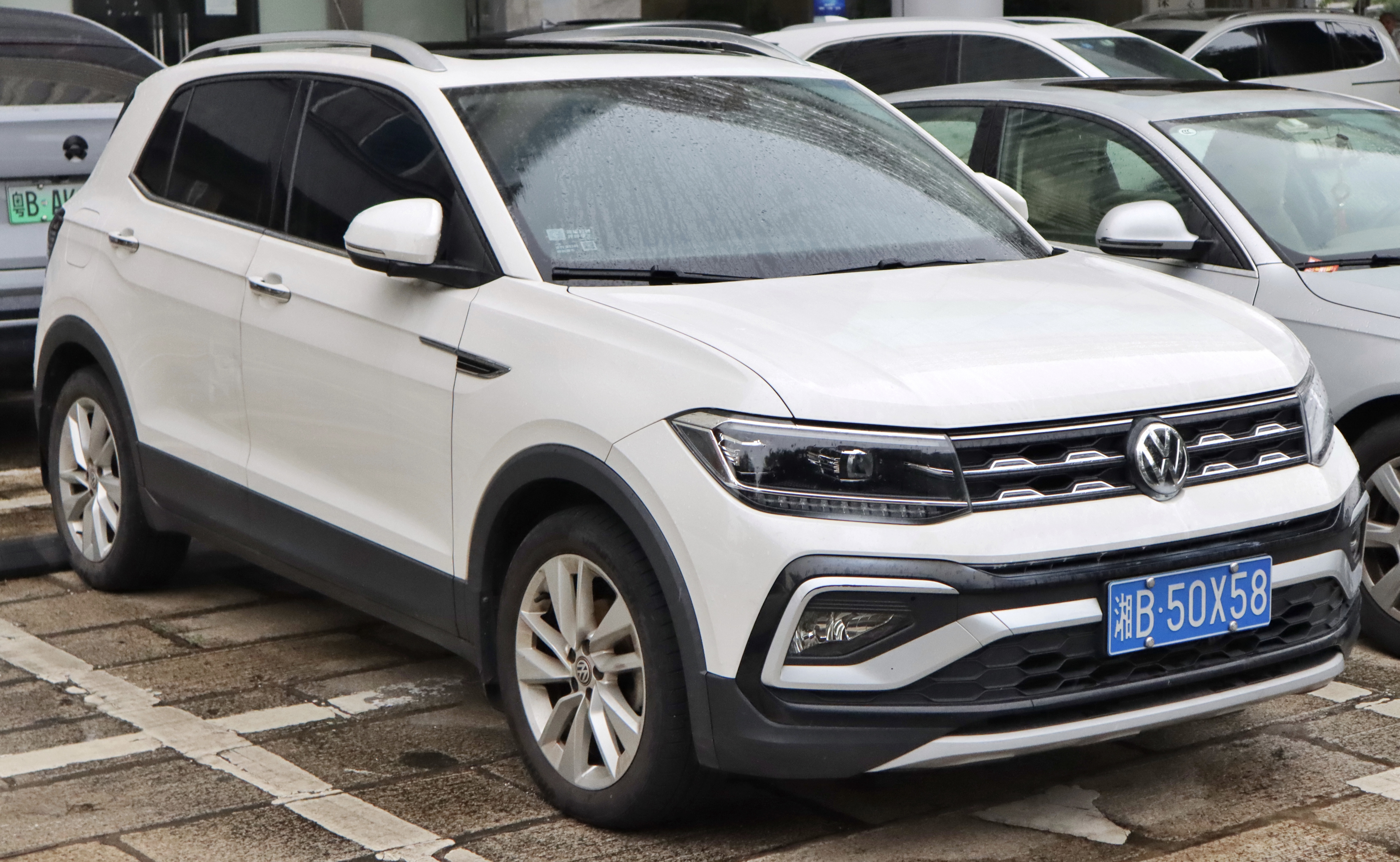
Volkswagen T-Cross (China)

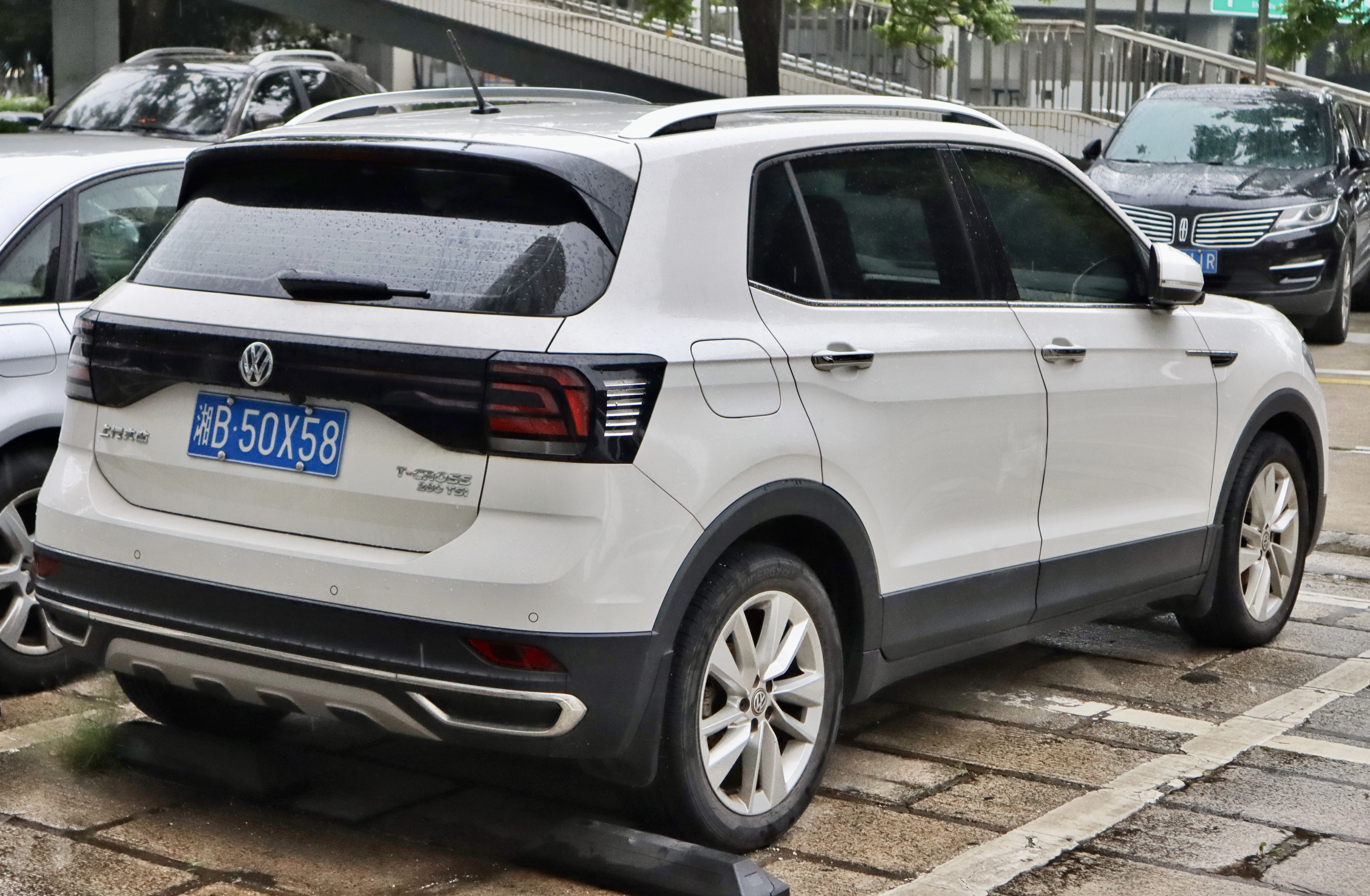
Rear

==== Tacqua ====
The twin model of the T-Cross for the Chinese market is named the Tacqua (Chinese: 探影; pinyin: tàn yǐng). Manufactured and marketed by FAW-VW, the Tacqua bears more resemblance with the Brazilian-made T-Cross in terms of exterior appearance, with the exception of the Tacqua R-Line model which is a new design. The Tacqua offers the same long-wheelbase body and engine options as the T-Cross built by SAIC-VW, which are 1.4-litre TSI and 1.5-litre MPI. It was unveiled in November 2019 and launched to the market in December 2019.

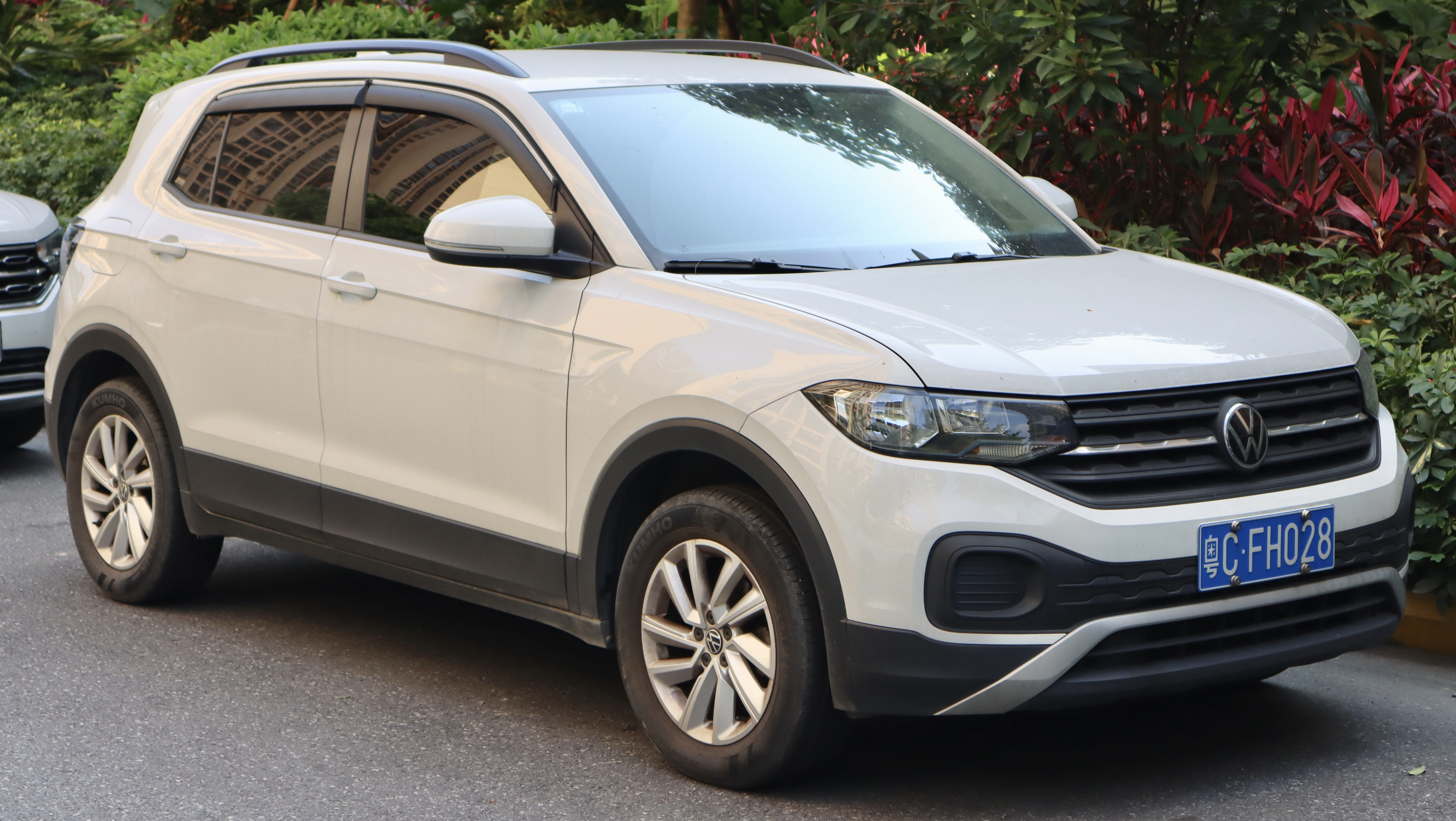
Volkswagen Tacqua (China)

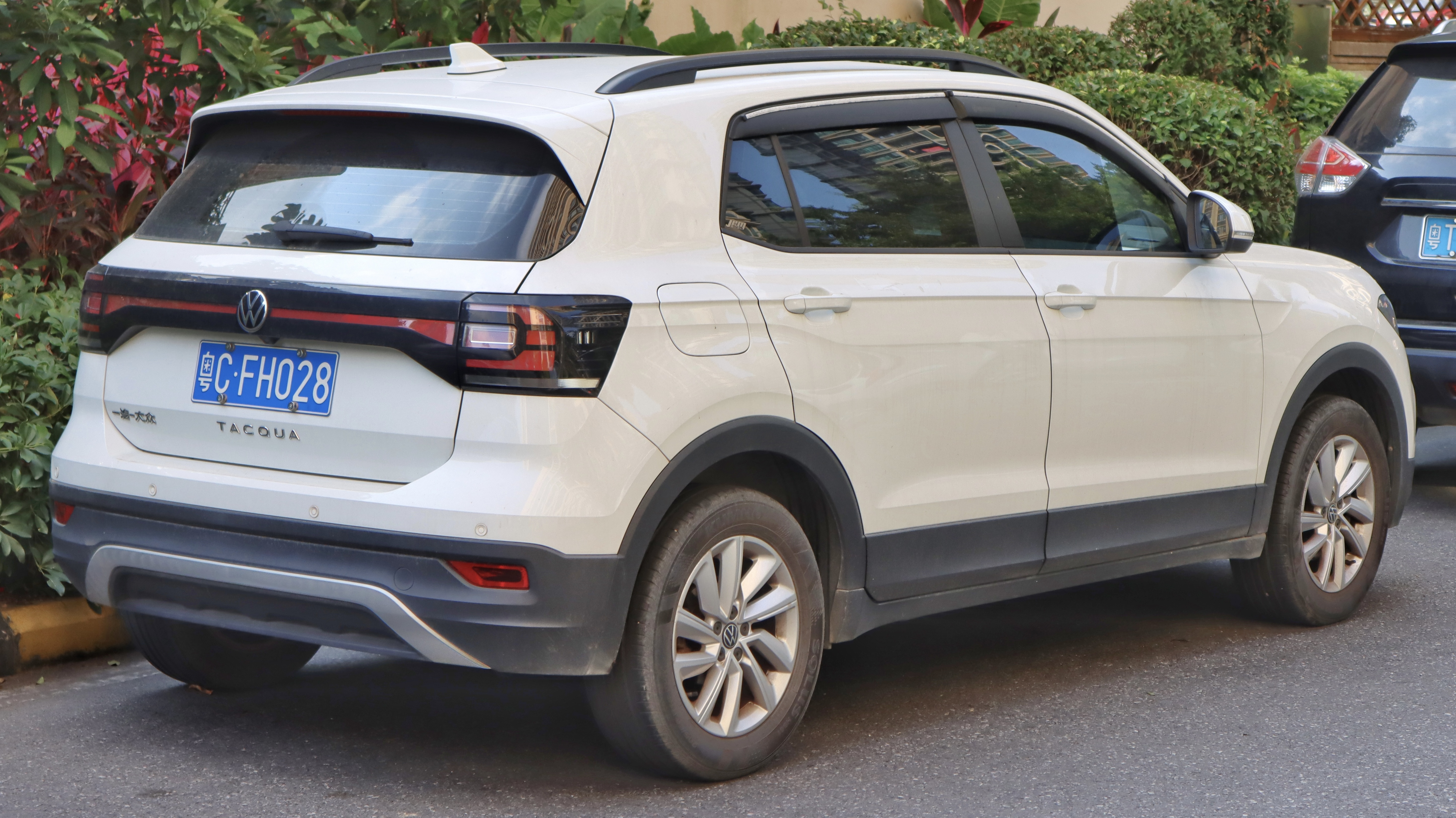
Rear

==== Tharu XR ====
In June 2024, SAIC-VW introduced a lengthened and redesigned version of the T-Cross called the Volkswagen Tharu XR (Chinese: 途岳新锐; pinyin: tú yuè xīnruì). It borrows its nameplate from the larger Tharu. While retaining the same 2,651 mm (104.4 in) wheelbase, Volkswagen extended its front rear overhang by a total of 134 mm (5.3 in), bringing the vehicle length to 4,355 mm (171.5 in).

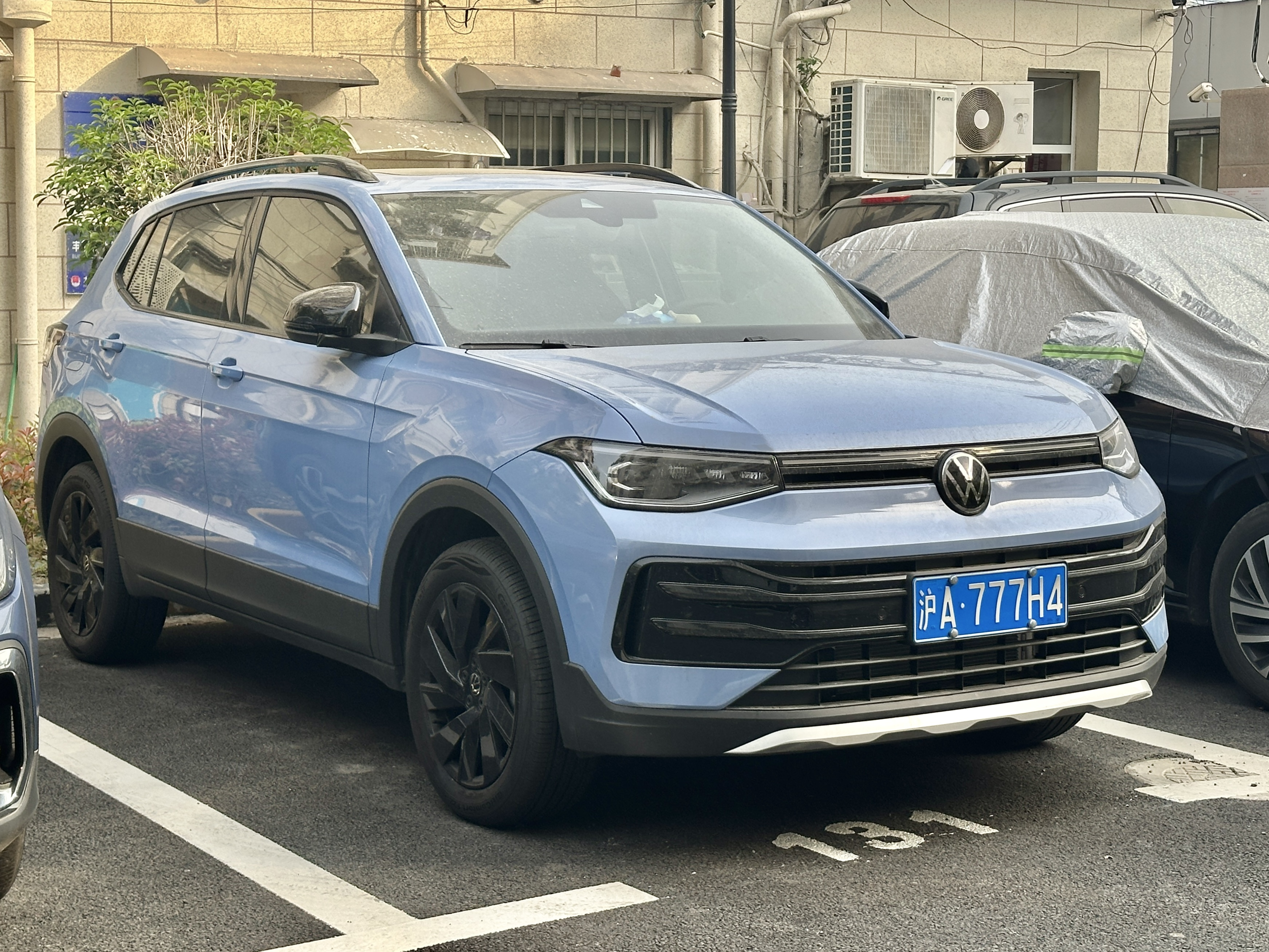
Volkswagen Tharu XR (China)

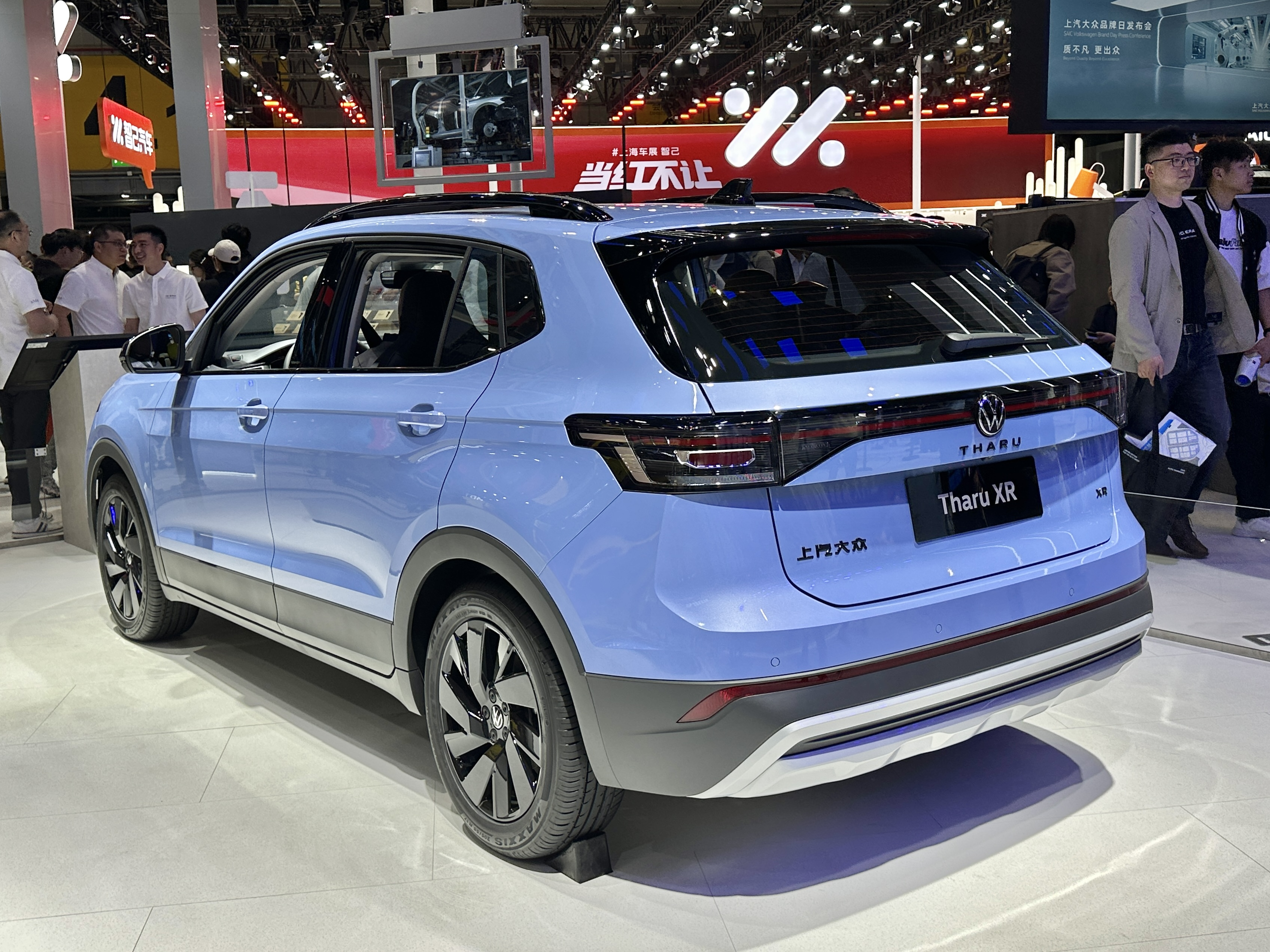
Rear

==== Powertrain ====
Petrol engines
Model	Displacement	Power	Torque	Transmission
1.4 TSI '280 TSI'^{†}	1,395 cc I4	150 PS (110 kW; 148 hp)	250 N⋅m (184 lb⋅ft)	7-speed DSG
1.5 MPI	1,498 cc I4	115 PS (85 kW; 113 hp)	145 N⋅m (107 lb⋅ft)	5/6-speed manual

^{† Marketed and labeled as such in China}

=== India (Taigun) ===
In February 2020, Volkswagen revealed the Taigun for the Indian market which is based from the Chinese market T-Cross with several changes, such as the redesigned C-pillar. It is unrelated to the concept model from 2012 with the same name. Volkswagen stated the Taigun is built on a modified MQB A0 platform dedicated for Indian market called the MQB A0 IN. It went on sale in India in September 2021.

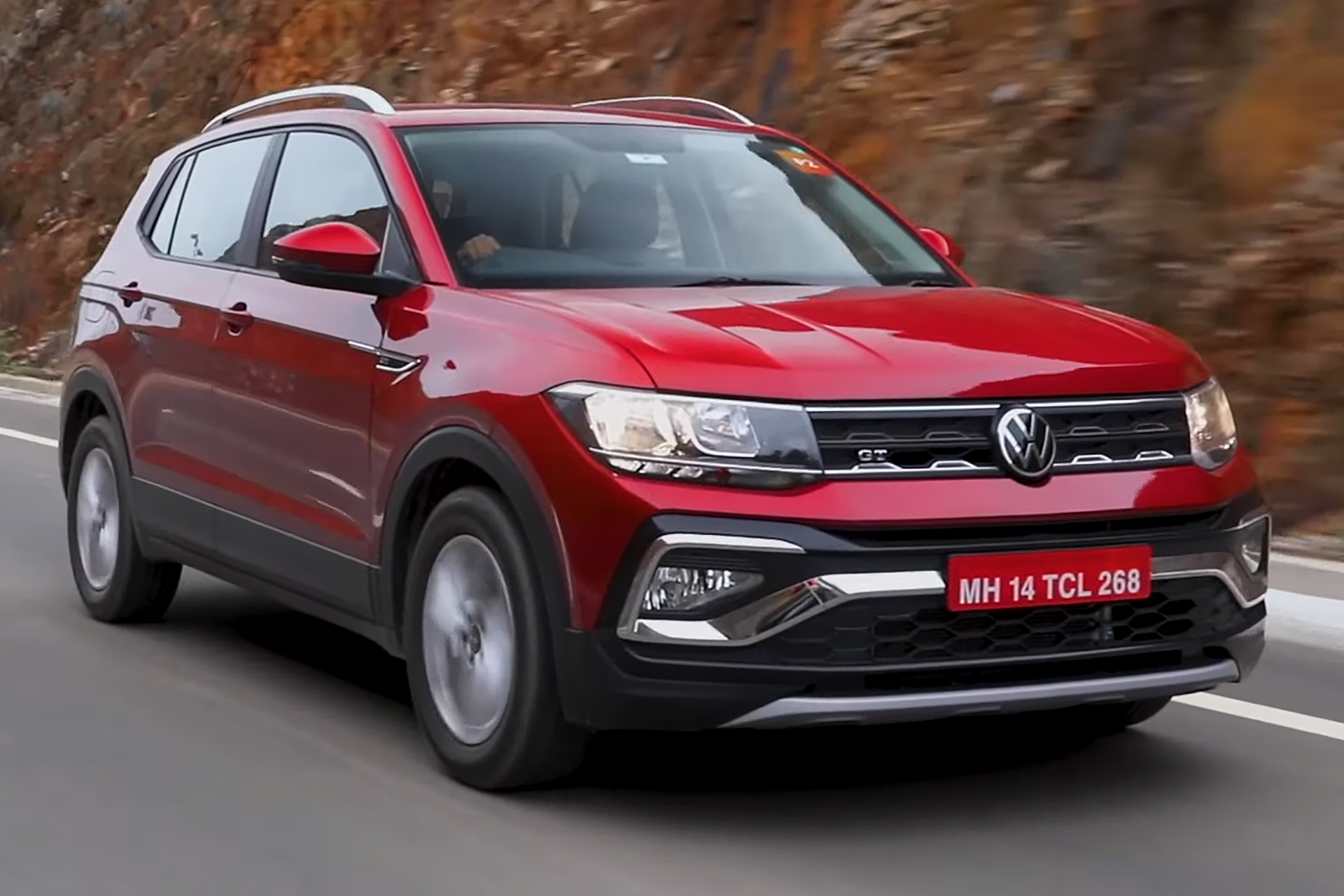
2021 Volkswagen Taigun GT (India)

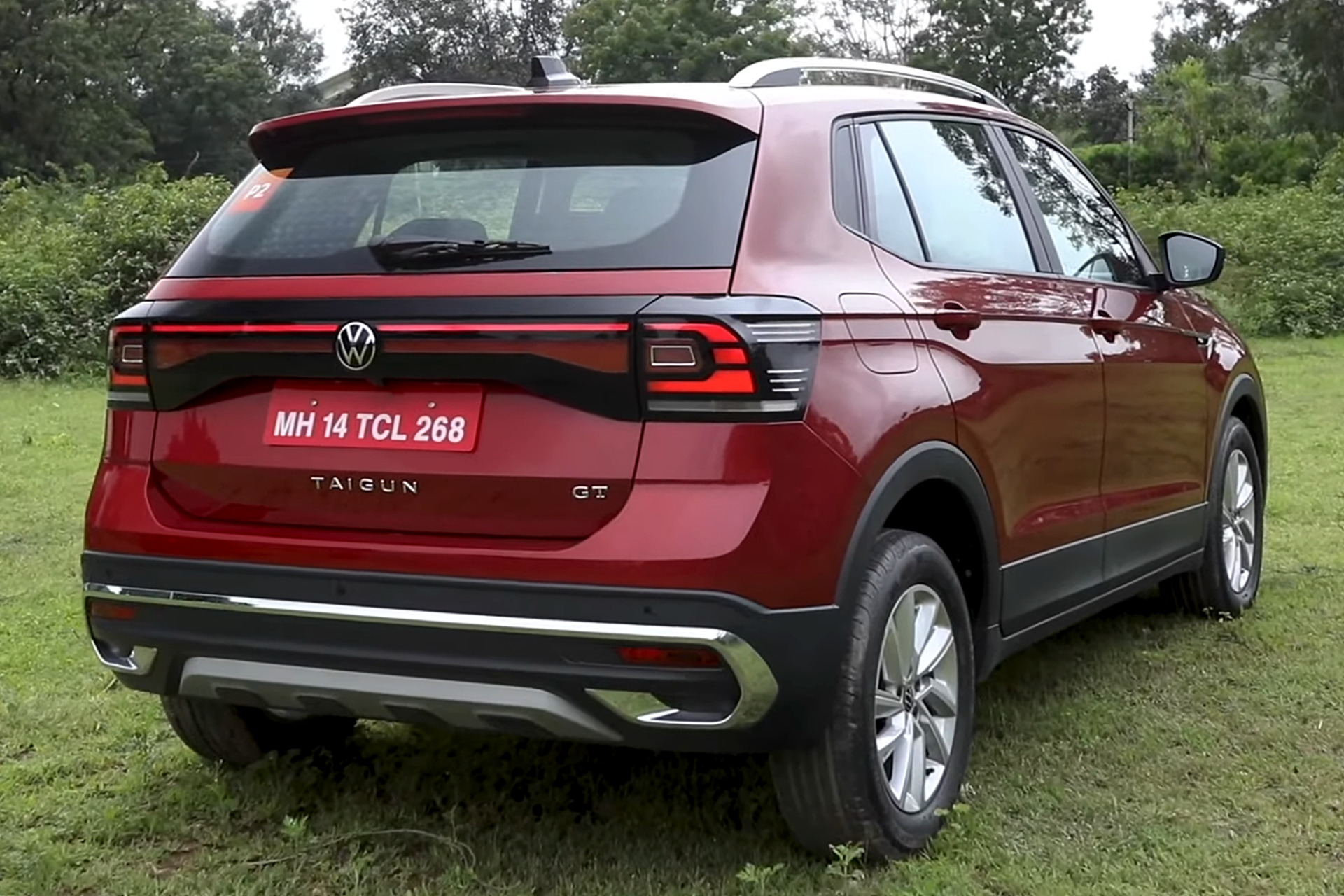
2021 Volkswagen Taigun GT (India)

==== Philippines ====
The T-Cross was launched in the Philippines on 26 May 2021. It is available in S and SE trims, powered by a 180 MPI 1.5-litre petrol engine. It was discontinued in September 2025 following the termination of distributorship agreement between AC Industrials and Volkswagen Group.

==== Indonesia ====
The T-Cross has been sold in Indonesia since 23 February 2022. Based on the Indian market Taigun, it is offered in a single variant with a 1.0-litre TSI engine.

=== South Africa ===
The T-Cross was launched in South Africa on 30 August 2024, in three trim levels: Life, Style and R-Line, it is powered by a 1.0 TSI turbocharged petrol engine paired a 7-speed DSG. In February 2025, two new entry-level variants were added with the option of the 1.0 TSI engine with 95 PS (70 kW; 94 hp).

== Safety ==
=== ANCAP ===
ANCAP test results Volkswagen T-Cross (2019, aligned with Euro NCAP)
Test	Points	%
Overall:	5 /5 stars	
Adult occupant:	36.8	97%
Child occupant:	41.7	85%
Pedestrian:	38.8	81%
Safety assist:	10.4	80%

=== Euro NCAP ===
The Euro NCAP has awarded the T-Cross a five-star rating. It scored 97% for adult occupant safety, 86% for child safety, 81% in the pedestrians and other vulnerable road users category and 80% for on-board safety tech. The T-Cross features several passive and active safety systems, including pedestrian and cyclist protection, automatic emergency braking, front assist and a speed limiter. High-end trim levels add several advanced features including adaptive cruise control, hill start assist and blind-spot monitoring.

Euro NCAP test results Volkswagen T-Cross (2019)
Test	Points	%
Overall:	5 /5 stars	
Adult occupant:	36.9	97%
Child occupant:	42.4	86%
Pedestrian:	38.9	81%
Safety assist:	10.4	80%

Euro NCAP test results Volkswagen T-Cross 1.0 TSI (LHD) (2025)
Test	Points	%
Overall:	3 /5 stars	
Adult occupant:	29.7	74%
Child occupant:	39.8	81%
Pedestrian:	38.4	60%
Safety assist:	10.3	57%

=== Global NCAP ===
2022 Volkswagen Taigun 'Comfortline' RHD (India, 2 airbags)
Global NCAP 2.0 scores (H2 2022)
Adult occupant stars	5/5 stars
Adult occupant score	29.64/34.00
Child occupant stars	5/5 stars
Child occupant score	42.00/49.00
Bodyshell Integrity	Stable

=== Latin NCAP ===
Latin NCAP 2.0 test results Volkswagen T-Cross + 6 Airbags (2019, based on Euro NCAP 2008)
Test	Points	Stars
Adult occupant:	31.62/34.0	5 /5 stars
Child occupant:	42.77/49.00	5 /5 stars

Latin NCAP 3.0 test results Volkswagen T-Cross + 6 Airbags (2021, similar to Euro NCAP 2014)
Test	Points	%
Overall:	5 /5 stars	
Adult occupant:	36.92	92%
Child occupant:	44.00	90%
Pedestrian:	31.50	66%
Safety assist:	36.53	85%

== Sales and production figures ==
Year	Sales										Global production
Year	Europe (Note: Europe: 2020 EU 27 + UK + Switzerland + Norway + Iceland)	Turkey	South Africa	China		Argentina	Brazil	Colombia	Mexico		Global production
Year	Europe	Turkey	South Africa	T-Cross	Tacqua	Argentina	Brazil	Colombia	T-Cross	Taigun	Global production
2019	101,229		3,516	63,495	2,457	3,660	37,081	1,059	788		274,071
2020	113,320		5,693	44,523	30,908	9,779	60,124	1,429	5,961		285,824
2021	125,325		7,516	30,195	31,535	4,400	62,313	2,064	6,690		295,101
2022	110,157	4,573	10,384	14,349	21,513	2,134	65,190	1,944	7,965		315,036
2023			7,152	15,128	19,780	2,022	72,446		4,058	9,776	261,519
2024		8,990		6,169	7,875	5,365	83,976		718	14,930	
2025		11,673		7,439	2,660		92,842				
