= Škoda Kylaq =

Subcompact crossover SUV

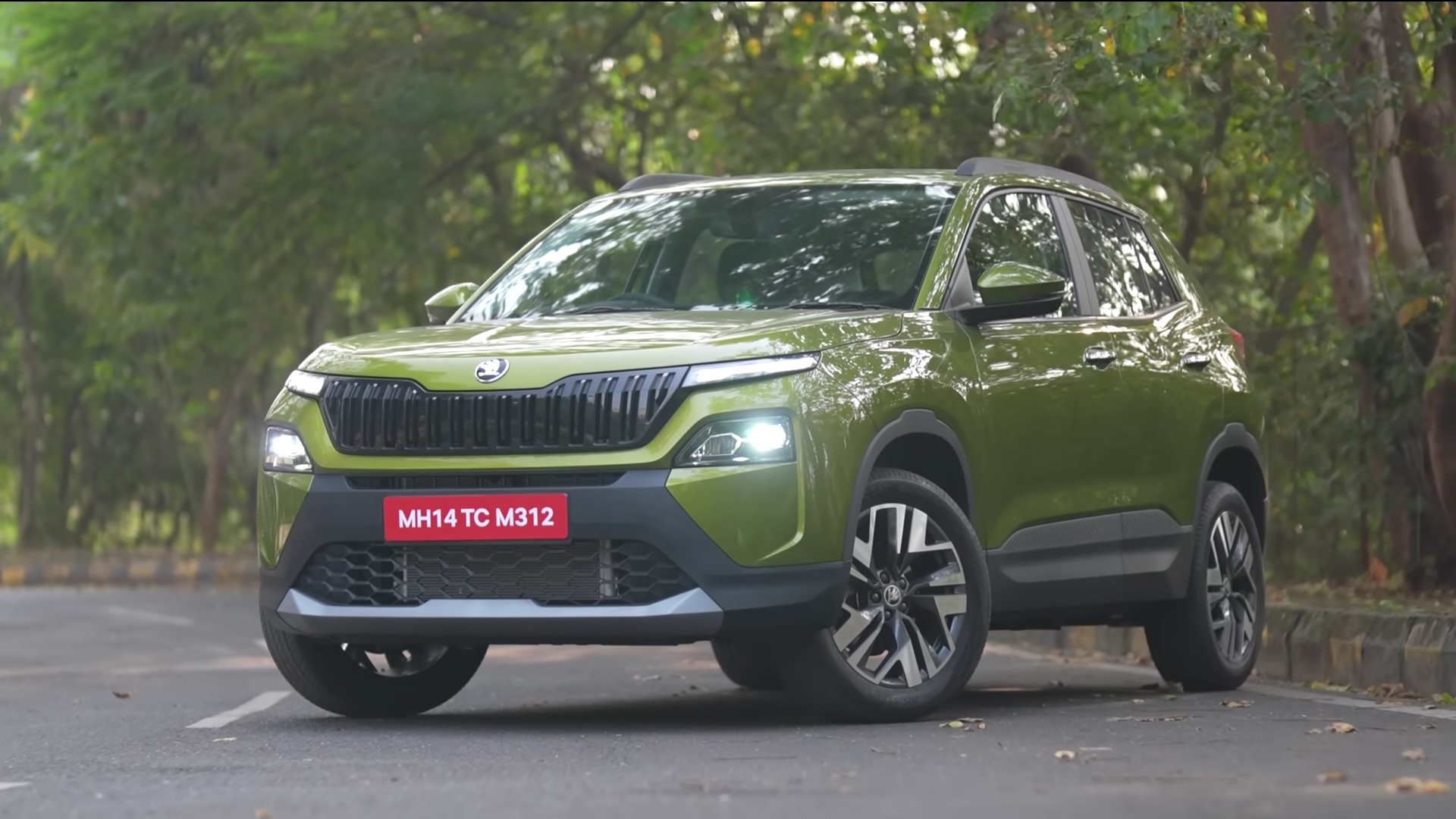

Overview
- Manufacturer: Škoda Auto
- Production: December 2024–present
- Assembly: India: Chakan (Škoda VW India)

Body and chassis
- Class: Subcompact crossover SUV
- Body style: 5-door SUV
- Layout: Front-engine, front-wheel-drive
- Platform: Volkswagen Group MQB-A0-IN
- Related: Škoda Kushaq; Volkswagen Taigun

Powertrain
- Engine: 1.0 L TSI turbocharged petrol I3
- Transmission: 6-speed manual 6-speed automatic

Dimensions
- Wheelbase: 2,566 mm (101.0 in)
- Length: 3,995 mm (157.3 in)
- Width: 1,783 mm (70.2 in)
- Height: 1,619 mm (63.7 in)

The Škoda Kylaq is a subcompact crossover SUV produced by Czech automaker Škoda Auto in India. It was unveiled on 6 November 2024 and is Škoda’s first model in India’s sub-4-metre SUV segment.

The Kylaq is built on the locally adapted MQB-A0-IN platform, shared with the Škoda Kushaq and Škoda Slavia. It is manufactured at Škoda Volkswagen India’s Chakan plant near Pune.

== Overview ==
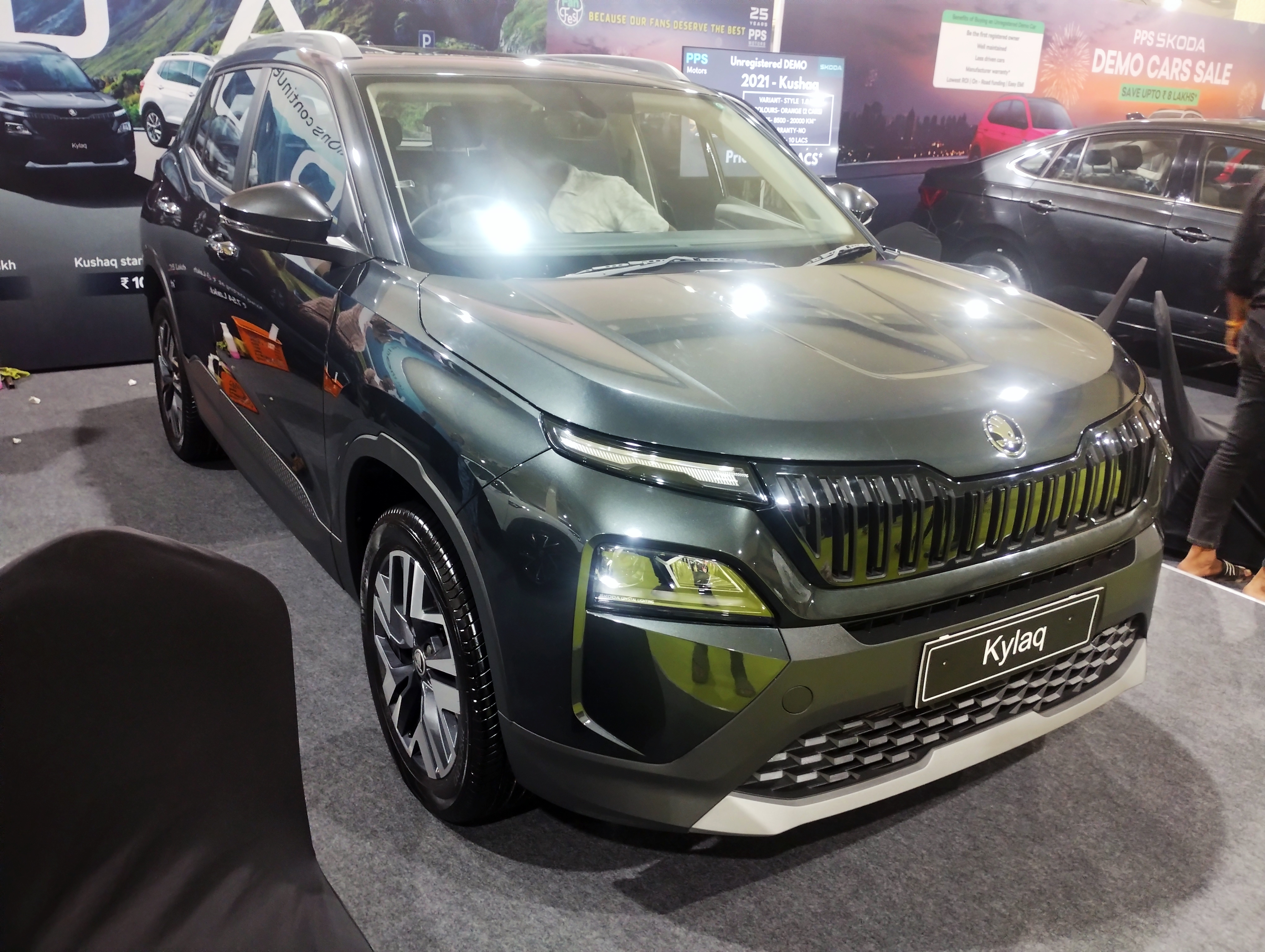
Kylaq at 4th International Auto Show, Bangalore (2025)

The Kylaq was developed and manufactured in India for the Indian market. It uses elements of Škoda’s Modern Solid design language and is positioned below the Kushaq as the brand’s entry-level SUV in India.

The vehicle is 3,995 mm (157.3 in) long, 1,783 mm (70.2 in) wide and 1,619 mm (63.7 in) high, with a 2,566 mm (101.0 in) wheelbase and 189 mm (7.4 in) of ground clearance. Its boot capacity is 446 L (15.8 cu ft), expanding to 1,265 L (44.7 cu ft) with the rear seats folded.

== Powertrain ==
The Kylaq is powered by a 1.0-litre turbocharged three-cylinder petrol engine producing 115 PS (85 kW; 113 hp) and 178 N⋅m (131 lb⋅ft) of torque. Power is sent to the front wheels through either a six-speed manual or six-speed automatic transmission.

Engine	Displacement	Power	Torque	Transmission
1.0 TSI	999 cc turbocharged petrol I3	115 PS (85 kW; 113 hp)	178 N⋅m (131 lb⋅ft)	6-speed manual or 6-speed automatic

== Interior and equipment ==
The Kylaq features a 10.1-inch central touchscreen infotainment system with wireless Android Auto and Apple CarPlay, along with an 8-inch digital instrument display. It also offers wireless smartphone charging and ventilated, six-way electrically adjustable front seats on selected versions.

== Variants ==
At launch, the Kylaq was offered in Classic, Signature, Signature+ and Prestige trim levels. The range subsequently expanded to include additional variants, including Prestige+.

== Safety ==
Škoda states that the Kylaq includes more than 25 active and passive safety features as standard, including six airbags, electronic stability control, multi-collision braking, roll-over protection, motor slip regulation, electronic differential lock and XDS+.

The Kylaq received a five-star Bharat NCAP safety rating.

Bharat NCAP test results Skoda Kylaq (2025, based on Latin NCAP 2016)
Test	Score	Stars
Adult occupant protection	30.88/32.00	5 /5 stars
Child occupant protection	45.00/49.00	5 /5 stars
