= Škoda Kushaq =

Subcompact crossover SUV

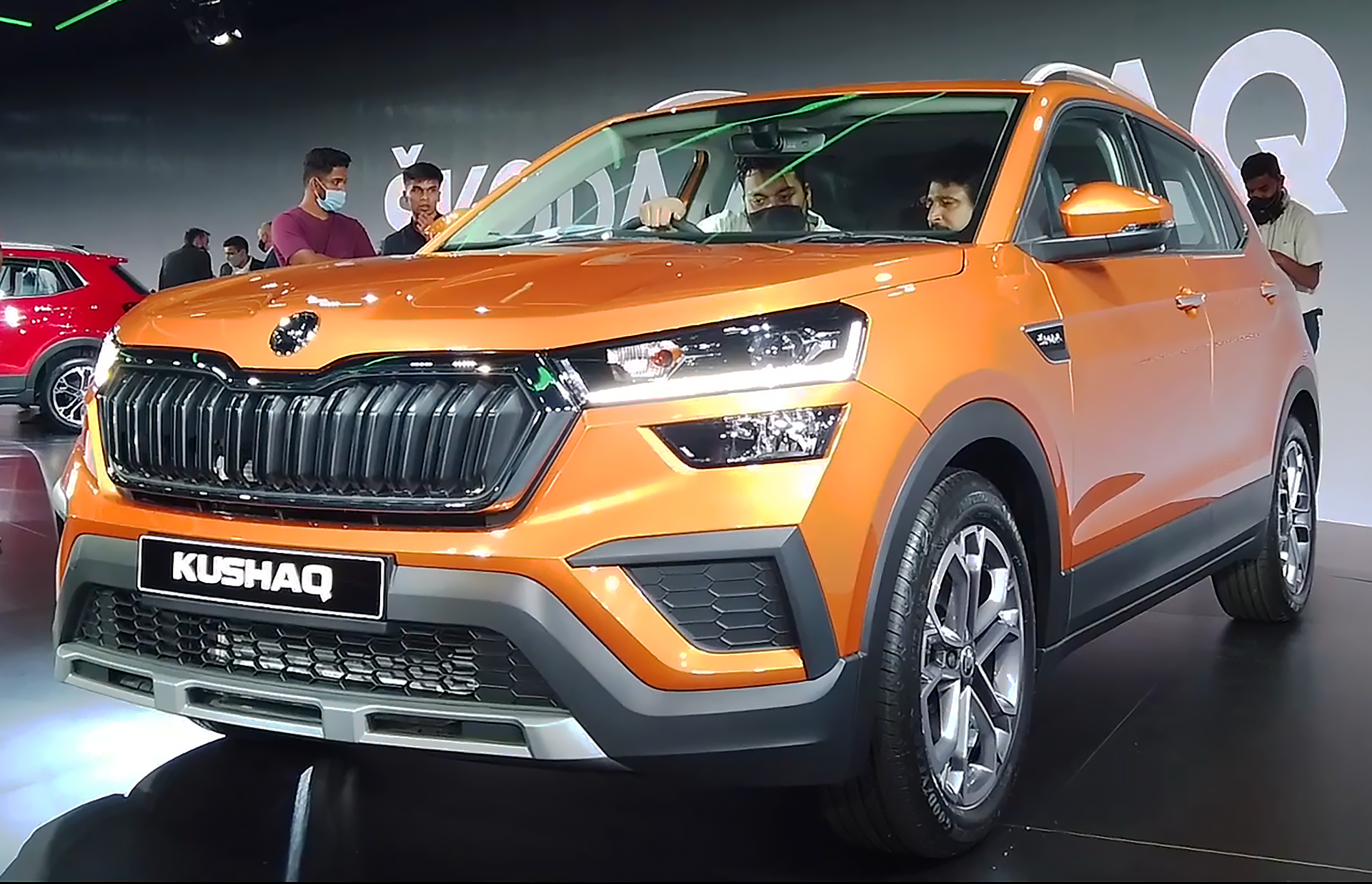

Overview
- Manufacturer: Škoda Auto
- Production: 2021–present
- Assembly: India: Chakan (Škoda VW India); Vietnam: Quảng Ninh (Thanh Cong Group)
- Designer: Dalibor Pantůček

Body and chassis
- Class: Subcompact SUV (B-segment)
- Body style: 5-door crossover SUV
- Layout: Front-engine, front-wheel-drive
- Platform: Volkswagen Group MQB A0 IN
- Related: Volkswagen Taigun; Volkswagen T-Cross; Škoda Kamiq

Powertrain
- Engine: Petrol: 1.0 L TSI 115 I3; 1.5 L TSI 150 I4
- Transmission: 6-speed manual 6-speed automatic 8-speed automatic(Facelift); 7-speed DSG

Dimensions
- Wheelbase: 2,651 mm (104.4 in)
- Length: 4,221 mm (166.2 in)
- Width: 1,760 mm (69.3 in)
- Height: 1,612 mm (63.5 in)

The Škoda Kushaq is a subcompact SUV (B-segment) manufactured by the Czech automaker Škoda Auto in India since 2021. The vehicle is heavily based on the Volkswagen T-Cross and its derivative for the Indian market, the Volkswagen Taigun. The name 'Kushaq' was derived from the Sanskrit word 'Kushak', which means 'King' or 'Emperor'.

== Overview ==
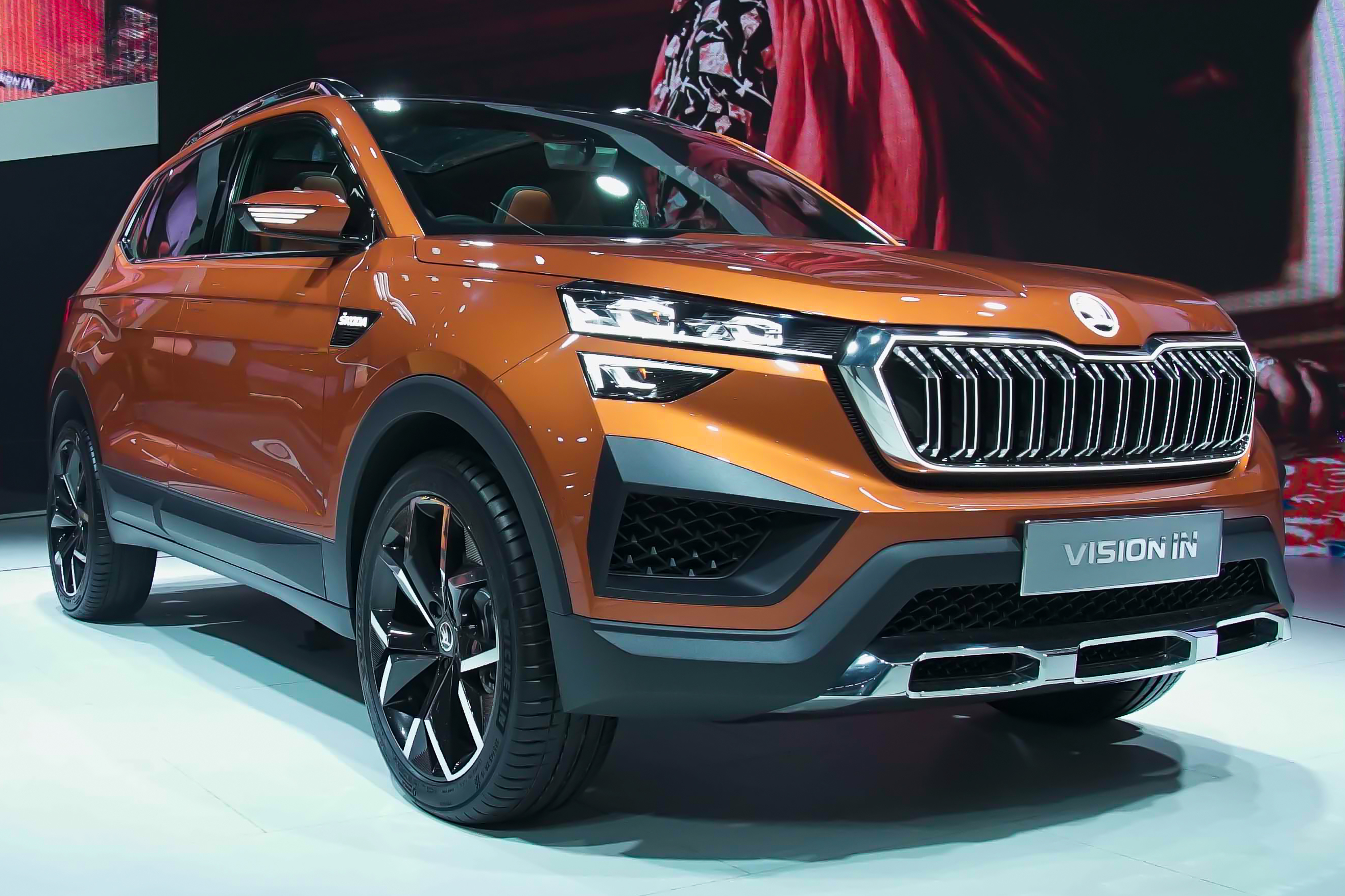
Škoda Vision IN

The vehicle was previewed as the Vision IN Concept in February 2020. The production model debuted on 18 March 2021 as the first product from Škoda Auto Volkswagen India’s "India 2.0 project". The car is built on the Volkswagen Group MQB A0 IN platform dedicated for Indian market and closely related with the Volkswagen Taigun. It is manufactured at Škoda's manufacturing plant in Chakan, Maharashtra, India.

The Kushaq in India is available with two petrol engine options, which are the entry-level 1.0-litre three-cylinder TSI producing 115 PS (113 hp; 85 kW) and a 1.5-litre four-cylinder TSI with 150 PS (148 hp; 110 kW). The 1.0-litre engine is available with 6-speed manual and 6-speed torque converter automatic gearbox options, while the 1.5-litre TSI unit, is available with a 7-speed dual-clutch automatic option and formerly, a 6-speed manual. The 6-speed manual transmission for the 1.5 TSI unit was discontinued in September 2024. Both the engines are produced at Škoda's Chakan plant. The Kushaq contains 95% local parts.

In May 2022, Škoda released the Monte Carlo edition for the Kushaq.

== 2026 facelift ==
The Kushaq facelift was unveiled on 20 January 2026, featuring a revised exterior styling with LED lighting and an illuminated rear Škoda light bar, along with a larger 10.1-inch touchscreen featuring a Google-powered AI assistant, a 10.25-inch digital instrument cluster on higher variants, a panoramic sunroof, and a segment-first rear-seat massage function; mechanically, it retained the 1.0 TSI and 1.5 TSI turbo-petrol engines while replacing the 1.0 TSI’s 6-speed automatic with a new 8-speed torque-converter unit.

== Other markets ==
=== Brunei ===
As the follow-up of the reintroduction of Škoda Auto brand in Brunei, Škoda Auto's distributor in Brunei, TCY Motors unveiled the Kushaq, offered in Ambition and Style variants powered with 1.0-litre TSI petrol engine mated with 6-speed automatic and other Škoda cars on 24 January 2024.

=== Middle East ===
In 2023, Škoda started exports of the Kushaq for the Middle East markets of Bahrain, Kuwait, Lebanon, Oman, Qatar, Saudi Arabia and the United Arab Emirates, under Volkswagen Group Middle East.

=== Vietnam ===
The Kushaq was launched in Vietnam on 28 June 2025, with two variants: Ambition and Style, it is powered by the 1.0 TSI turbocharged petrol engine.

== Powertrain ==
Petrol engines
Model	Displacement	Valvetrain configuration	Valves	Power	Torque	Transmission	Top Speed	Acceleration 0–100 km/h (0-62 mph)
1.0 TSI	999 cc I3	inline-3 DOHC	12	115 PS (85 kW; 113 hp)	175 N⋅m (129 lb⋅ft)	6-speed manual or 6-speed automatic	189 km/h (117 mph)	9.7 s
1.5 TSI	1,498 cc I4	inline-4 DOHC	16	150 PS (110 kW; 148 hp)	250 N⋅m (184 lb⋅ft)	7-speed DSG	204 km/h (127 mph)	7.9 s

== Safety ==
The Škoda Kushaq is equipped as standard with six airbags, anti-lock brakes, i-Size anchorages, ESC (electronic stability control), multi-collision brakes, a claimed high-strength steel structure, front and rear seatbelt pretensioners and three-point seatbelts with adjustable head restraints for all passengers. The top-spec 'Style' trim level is additionally equipped with a tyre pressure monitoring system (TPMS). At launch, side and curtain airbags and the tyre pressure monitor were not available on cars equipped with an automatic transmission, but this has since been corrected. And later in September 2024, all variants got 6 airbags as standard.

Global NCAP 2.0 test results (India) Volkswagen Taigun / Skoda Kushaq (H2 2022, similar to Latin NCAP 2016)
Test	Score	Stars
Adult occupant protection	29.64/34.00	5 /5 stars
Child occupant protection	42.00/49.00	5 /5 stars

In October 2022 the Kushaq was independently rated for safety by Global NCAP 2.0 (similar to Latin NCAP 2016) crash-testing a Volkswagen Taigun at Volkswagen's expense, and scored five stars for adult and child occupant protection, the first car to do so under the organisation's new assessment protocols. In the frontal offset test, protection of all body regions was good or acceptable, except for the driver's left tibia. In the side mobile barrier and pole tests, protection of the driver's chest was rated marginal, and protection of the driver's abdomen was rated acceptable in the side pole test. The Kushaq could pass minimum European regulatory requirements for electronic stability control and pedestrian protection.

== Sales ==
Year	Production
2021	16,291
2022	26,648
2023	27,760
