= Volkswagen Taigun =

Subcompact crossover SUV

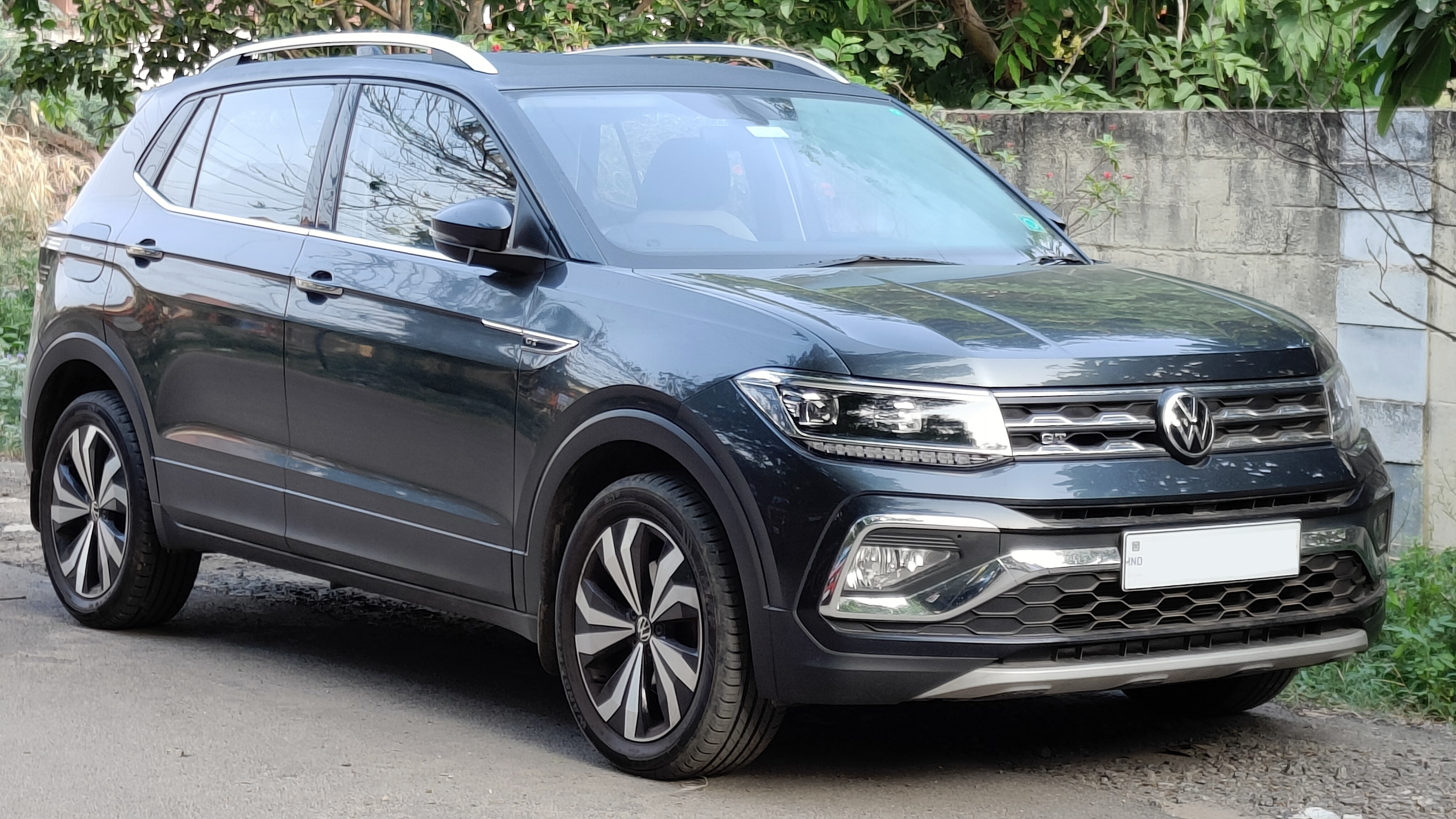
- 2022 Volkswagen Taigun GT Plus (India)

Overview
- Manufacturer: Volkswagen
- Also called: Volkswagen T-Cross
- Production: 2021–present
- Assembly: India: Chakan (Škoda VW India)

Body and chassis
- Class: Subcompact crossover SUV (B)
- Body style: 5-door SUV
- Layout: Front-engine, front-wheel-drive
- Platform: Volkswagen Group MQB A0 IN
- Related: Škoda Kushaq; Volkswagen Polo Mk6; Volkswagen Virtus; Volkswagen Taigo/Nivus; SEAT Arona; Škoda Kamiq

Powertrain
- Engine: Petrol: 1.0 L TSI 115 I3; 1.5 L TSI 150 I4
- Transmission: 6-speed manual 6-speed automatic 7-speed DSG

Dimensions
- Wheelbase: 2,651 mm (104.4 in)
- Length: 4,221 mm (166.2 in)
- Width: 1,760 mm (69.3 in)
- Height: 1,612 mm (63.5 in)

The Volkswagen Taigun is a subcompact crossover SUV (B-segment) manufactured by the German automaker Volkswagen since 2021. Manufactured in India and destined for the Indian and Mexican markets, the Taigun is based on the Volkswagen T-Cross.

The "Taigun" nameplate can be traced to 2012 when Volkswagen unveiled an unrelated smaller crossover SUV concept car with the same name. It was based on the Up city car and was planned to be mass-produced in 2016 for Europe, Brazil and India. However, the Up-based Taigun project was ultimately cancelled.

== Overview ==
The prototype version of the T-Cross-based Taigun was showcased at the Auto Expo in February 2020 and is planned on sale by mid-2021. The Taigun is based on the long-wheelbase version of the T-Cross, with several differences. For example, the Taigun shares a similar front-end with the Chinese-market T-Cross, and the C-pillar is also slightly reworked. Volkswagen stated the vehicle is built on the Volkswagen Group MQB A0 IN platform dedicated to the Indian market. The platform is also shared with the Škoda Kushaq which debuted in March 2021.

The production version of the Taigun was revealed on 31 March 2021. Under the VW Group's India 2.0 plan, the Taigun is made mainly for the Indian market up to 95 per cent of parts localization. The only visible changes made to the car compared to the 2020 prototype are the downsizing of the wheels from 19 inches to 17 inches. It is available with two petrol engine options, including a 1.0-litre three-cylinder TSI engine producing 115 PS (113 hp; 85 kW) and a 1.5-litre four-cylinder TSI unit with 150 PS (148 hp; 110 kW). The 1.0-litre engine is available with 6-speed manual and 6-speed torque converter automatic, while the 1.5-litre TSI unit is available with a 7-speed DSG and formerly, a 6-speed manual which was discontinued in 2024. It went on sale on 23 September 2021.

The GT Edge Trail special edition was announced in November 2023 in India, featuring some "adventurous" styling changes.

The car reached 100,000 sales mark (including both domestic and export) by September 2024.

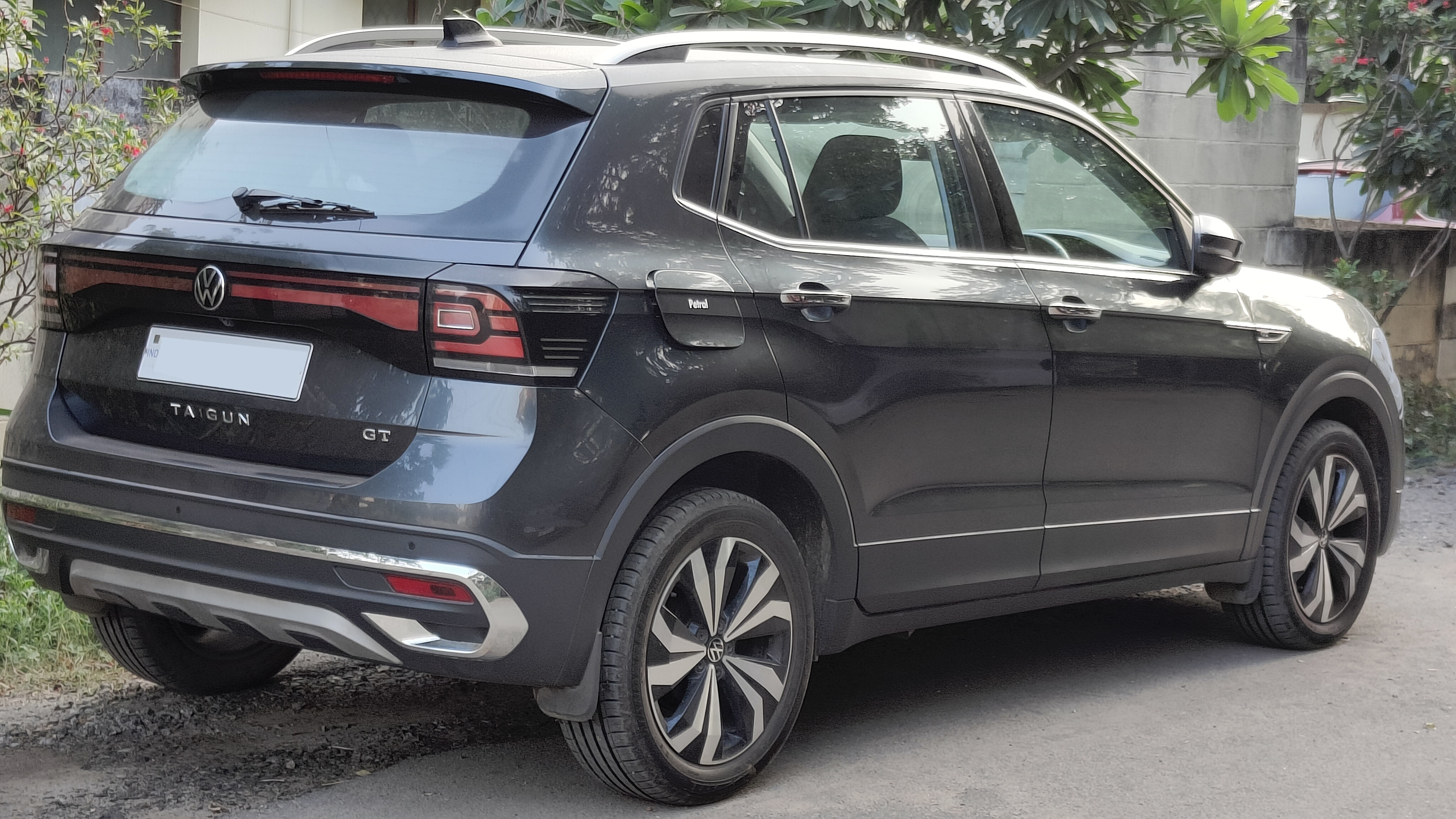
Rear view

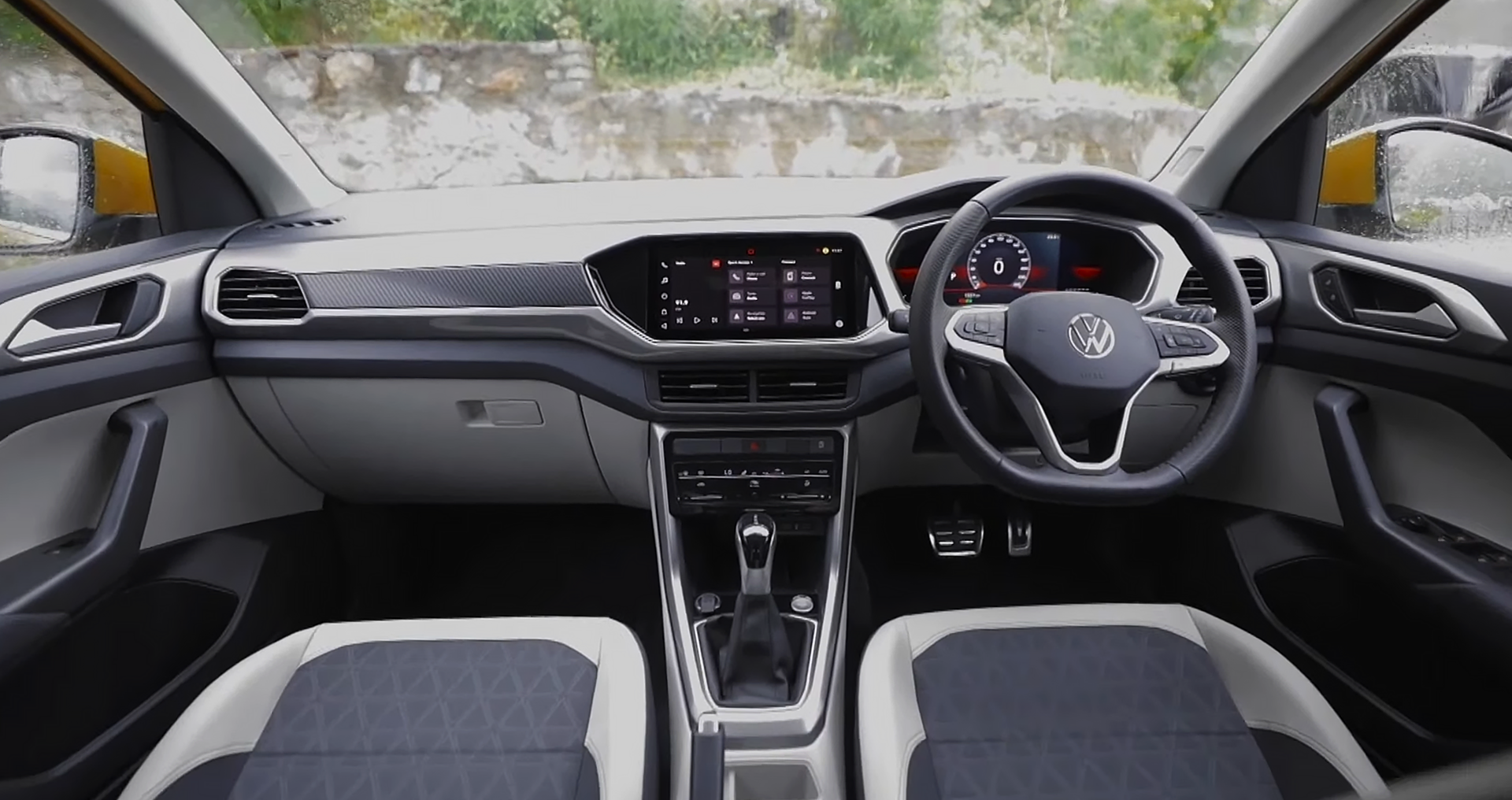
Interior

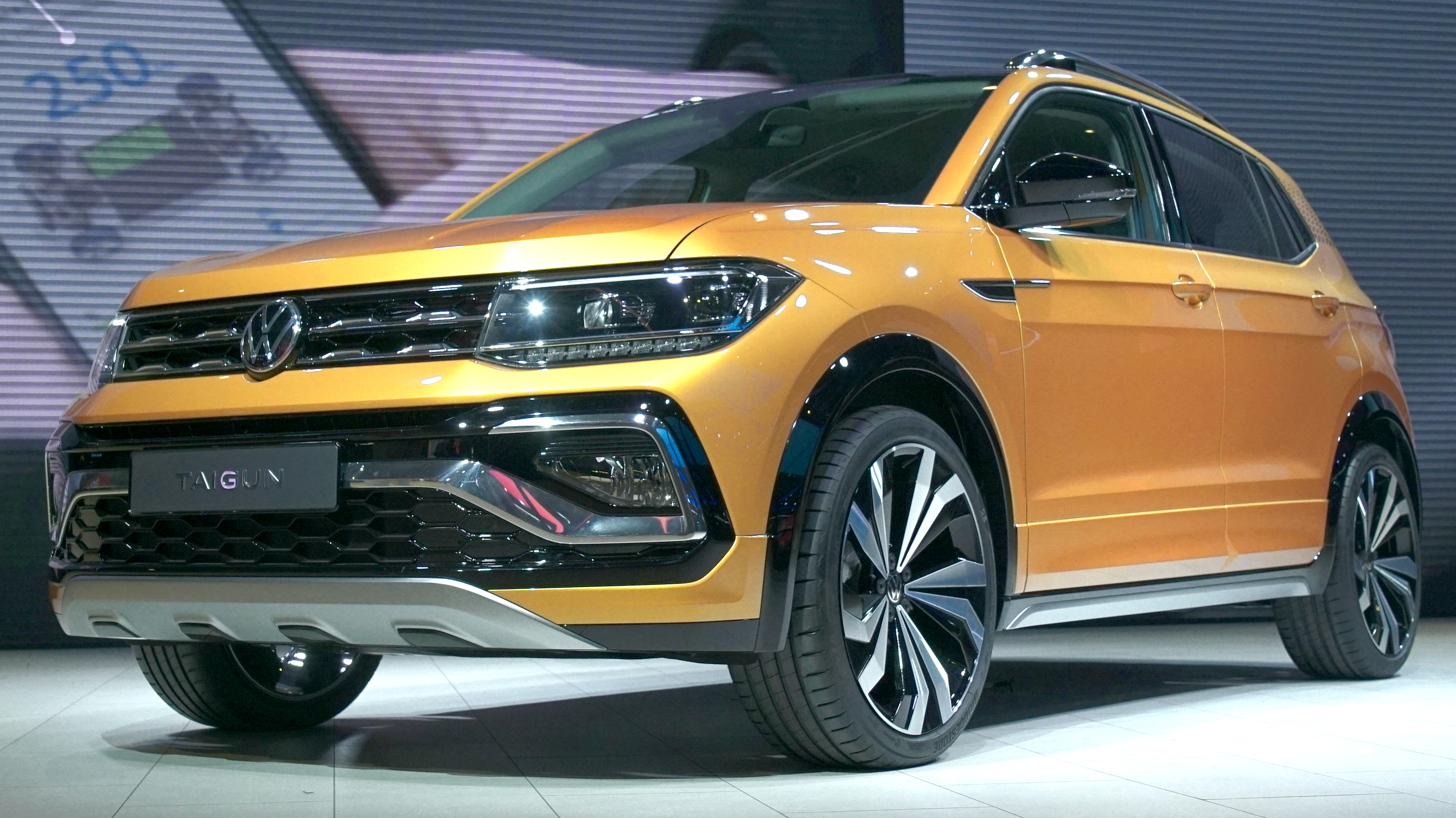
2020 prototype

== 2026 facelift ==
The Taigun facelift was unveiled in India on 9 April 2026, featuring revised front and rear styling, a connected LED light bar, illuminated Volkswagen badges, a panoramic sunroof, an updated 10.25-inch digital instrument cluster, and a new eight-speed automatic transmission for the 1.0-litre TSI engine.

== Markets ==
The Taigun is being exported from India to Indonesia as the T-Cross. It went on sale in Indonesia in February 2022 and is distributed by VW's local Indonesian importer/distributor, PT Garuda Mataram Motor. Additionally, beginning in 2022, the model is being exported from India to Mexico as the Taigun.

== Powertrain ==
Petrol engines
Model	Displacement	Power	Torque	Transmission	Acceleration 0-100 km/h (0-62 mph)	Top speed(km/h)
1.0 TSI	999 cc I3	115 PS (85 kW; 113 hp)	175 N⋅m (129 lb⋅ft)	6-speed manual or 6-speed automatic	9.7 s	195 km/h 121 mph
1.5 TSI	1,498 cc I4	150 PS (110 kW; 148 hp)	250 N⋅m (184 lb⋅ft)	7-speed DSG	8.1 s	127 mph (204 km/h)

== Safety ==
The Volkswagen Taigun is sold in India with a standard safety specification of six airbags, i-Size approved ISOFIX anchorages, Electronic Stability Control, three-point seatbelts in all seats and post-collision braking. Higher trim levels are additionally equipped with a tyre pressure monitoring system (TPMS). Left-hand-drive versions of the Taigun (exported to Mexico as the T-Cross) are equipped with safety assist technologies like Autonomous Emergency Braking, which are not available in India, and they have side airbags available as standard instead of as an option.

Global NCAP 2.0 test results (India) Volkswagen Taigun / Skoda Kushaq (H2 2022, similar to Latin NCAP 2016)
Test	Score	Stars
Adult occupant protection	29.64/34.00	5 /5 stars
Child occupant protection	42.00/49.00	5 /5 stars

In October 2022 the Taigun was independently crash-tested by the Global New Car Assessment Programme (Global NCAP 2.0, similar to Latin NCAP 2016) at Volkswagen's expense and scored five stars for adult and child occupant protection, the first car to do so under the organisation's new assessment protocols. In the frontal offset test, protection of all body regions was good or acceptable, except for the driver's left tibia. In the side, mobile barrier and pole tests, protection of the driver's chest was rated marginal, and protection of the driver's abdomen was rated acceptable in the side pole test. The Taigun could pass minimum European regulatory requirements for electronic stability control and pedestrian protection.

Latin NCAP 3.5 test results Volkswagen Taigun + 6 Airbags (2023, similar to Euro NCAP 2017)
Test	Points	%
Overall:	5 /5 stars	
Adult occupant:	39.99	92%
Child occupant:	45	92%
Pedestrian:	26.47	55%
Safety assist:	35.81	83%

== Concept version ==
Volkswagen Taigun Concept

Overview
- Production: Cancelled

Body and chassis
- Class: Subcompact crossover SUV (B)
- Body style: 5-door SUV
- Layout: Front engine, front-wheel drive
- Platform: Volkswagen Group NSF
- Related: Volkswagen up! Volkswagen Crossblue concept

Powertrain
- Engine: 1.0L I3

Dimensions
- Wheelbase: 2,469 mm (97.2 in)
- Length: 3,858 mm (151.9 in)
- Width: 1,727 mm (68.0 in)
- Height: 1,570 mm (61.8 in)

Unrelated to the 2021 Taigun, the Volkswagen Taigun nameplate debuted as a near-production concept subcompact crossover SUV. Targeting Europe, Brazil and India as its main markets, it had the potential of replacing the hatchback CrossFox, and slotting below the Tiguan compact crossover SUV, competing against mini crossover SUVs alongside the Nissan Juke, the Mini Countryman and the Suzuki SX4.

The prototype was unveiled at the 2012 São Paulo International Motor Show. The Taigun was planned to be unveiled by the Volkswagen Group for the model year of 2016, however the plan was scrapped. The car was deemed too small, contrary with the market trend and was instead replaced by the Volkswagen T-Cross which went on sale in 2018.

== Sales ==
FY	India	Export
FY2022	16,889	2,851
FY2023	21,736	7,958
FY2024	20,485	12,621
FY2025	8,030	9,312
Total	67,140	32,742
