= Škoda Auto Volkswagen India =

Indian subsidiary of Volkswagen

Škoda Auto Volkswagen India Private Limited
- Formerly: Volkswagen India; Volkswagen Group Sales India; Škoda Auto India
- Type: Subsidiary
- Industry: Automotive
- Founded: 2001; 25 years ago
- Headquarters: Pune, Maharashtra
- Area served: India
- Key people: Piyush Arora (MD)
- Products: Automobiles
- Production output: ▼51,541 units (2019)
- Brands: Škoda Auto; Volkswagen; Audi; Porsche; Lamborghini; Bentley
- Revenue: ▲₹17,042 crore (US$1.8 billion) (2023)
- Net income: ▲₹310 crore (US$32 million) (2023)
- Owner: JSW Group (51%); Volkswagen Group (49%) Pending
- Website: www.skoda-vw.co.in

Škoda Auto Volkswagen India Private Limited is the wholly owned Indian subsidiary of German automotive manufacturing company Volkswagen Group, formed in 2001.

On 7 October 2019, Volkswagen Group India announced the merger of their three Indian subsidiaries - Volkswagen India Pvt. Ltd. (VWIPL), Volkswagen Group Sales India Pvt. Ltd. (NSC) and Škoda Auto India Pvt Ltd (SAIPL) - into a single entity named Škoda Auto Volkswagen India Pvt. Ltd. (SAVIPL) with headquarters at Pune. Gurpratap Boparai was appointed as the first managing director of Škoda Auto Volkswagen India.

They focus on manufacture and sales of Volkswagen, Audi and Škoda vehicles in India. Volkswagen Group brands Porsche, Lamborghini and Bentley also sell their cars through them in India.

== Production facilities ==
The company operates two manufacturing plants. The first plant at Chakan, near Pune, Maharashtra, was previously owned by Volkswagen India with an annual capacity of 200,000 vehicles. The other plant in Aurangabad, Maharashtra was previously operated by Škoda Auto India and mainly used for CKD assembly of Volkswagen, Škoda and Audi vehicles. In 2020, Škoda launched their first ever imported compact CUV model, the Karoq.

Volkswagen has an engine assembly facility (an extension to the previously mentioned plant) built in 2015 at a cost of 240 crore (€710 million) approximately at their state-of-the-art factory in Chakan, Pune respectively. The plant reportedly holds production capacity of about 98,000 engines annually.

== Models ==
=== Škoda Auto ===
==== Current models ====
Model	Indian introduction	Current model		Notes
Model	Indian introduction	Introduction	Update (facelift)	Notes
Sedan
Slavia	2022	2022	2026	
Octavia	2002	2025		Locally assembled (2002-2023); Imported (2025-present, only RS variant)
SUV/crossover
Kylaq	2025	2025	—	
Kushaq	2021	2021	2026	
Kodiaq	2017	2025	—	Assembled using Complete knock down kits (CKD), Imported (2026–present) Only RS Variant

==== Discontinued models ====
Model	Released	Discontinued	Image	Notes
Superb	2004	2025		Locally assembled (2005-2023); Imported (2024-2025)
Octavia Combi	2005	2008		
Laura	2005	2013		
Fabia	2008	2013		
Yeti	2010	2017		
Rapid	2011	2021		
Karoq	2020	2021		Imported

=== Volkswagen ===
==== Current models ====
===== ICE Vehicles =====
Model	Indian introduction	Current model		
Model	Indian introduction	Introduction	Update (facelift)	Notes
Hatchback
Golf GTI	2025	2025	—	Imported from Germany
Sedan
Virtus	2022	2022	—	—
SUV/crossover
Taigun	2021	2021	2026	—
Tiguan R-Line	2017 (as Tiguan)	2025	—	Imported from Germany
Tayron R-Line	2026	2026	—	Assembled using Complete knock down kits (CKD)

==== Discontinued models ====
Model	Released	Discontinued	Image	Notes
Passat	2007	2020		
Jetta	2008	2017		
Beetle	2009	2017		Imported
Touareg	2009	2013		Imported
Phaeton	2010	2013		Imported
Polo	2010	2022		
Vento	2010	2022		
Polo GTI	2016	2018		Imported
Ameo	2016	2020		
T-Roc	2020	2021		Imported
Tiguan Allspace	2020	2021		Imported. Replaced by Tayron

=== Audi ===
Audi India
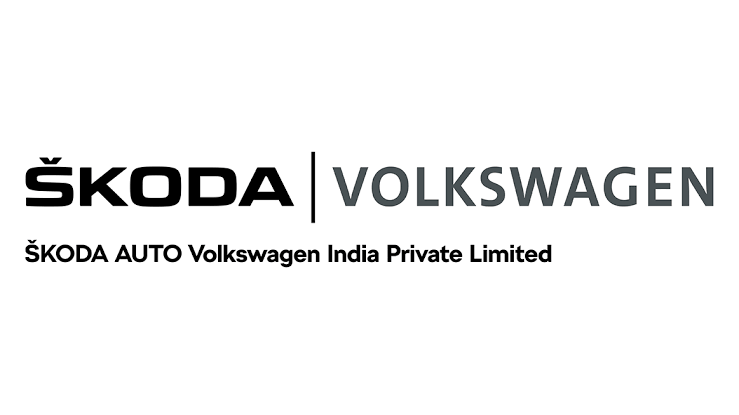
- Formerly: Automotive industry
- Headquarters: Mumbai, India
- Parent: Volkswagen Group
- Website: https://www.audi.in

Audi India was established in March 2007 as a division of Volkswagen Group Sales India. Audi is represented in 110 countries worldwide and since 2004, Audi has been selling its products on the Indian market.

In March 2007, Audi set up its own sales company for India. By establishing Audi India as a division of Volkswagen Group Sales India Pvt. Ltd. in Mumbai. Audi is making a clear long-term statement in the country with ambitious growths plans. Audi's goal is to become the leading automobile luxury brand in the Indian market.

The Audi India strategy encompasses significant investments in branding, marketing, manufacturing (locally assemble engines to cut down its import bill in a range of 10–30%), exclusive dealerships and after sales services. In 2007, only 2 percent of the new car buyers in India knew Audi. In 2008, it went up to 13 percent.

Starting August 1, 2025, Škoda Auto Volkswagen India Private Limited has named Mr. Nipun Mahajan as the new Head of Sales & Network for Audi India. He will report directly to Brand Director Balbir Singh Dhillon. Mahajan takes on this important role at a time when Audi India is facing tough challenges in the luxury car market.

==== Assembled locally (CKD) ====
- Audi A4 (2008–2025) (To be replaced by Audi A5)
- Audi A6 (2009–present)
- Audi Q3/Q3 Sportback (2023–present)
- Audi Q5 (2021–present)
- Audi Q7 (2013–present)

==== Imported ====
- Audi S5 Sportback
- Audi Q8/RSQ8 Performance/SQ8
- Audi Q8 e-tron/Q8 Sportback e-tron
- Audi RS E-tron GT

=== Porsche ===
- Porsche 911
- Porsche Cayenne
- Porsche Panamera
- Porsche Macan/Macan Electric
- Porsche Taycan

=== Lamborghini ===
- Lamborghini Urus SE
- Lamborghini Revuelto
- Lamborghini Temerario

=== Bentley ===
- Bentley Bentayga

== See also ==
- Automotive industry in India
