= Gigauri =

Gigauri (Georgian: გიგაური) is a Georgian surname. It may refer to

- Davit Gigauri (born 1994), Georgian rugby union player
- Eka Gigauri (born 1978), public figure and a civic activist
- George Gigauri, UN official and senior humanitarian
- Merab Gigauri (born 1993), Georgian football player
- Revaz Gigauri (born 1984), Georgian rugby union player
- Vladimir Gigauri (1934–2006), renowned Georgian-born Soviet scientist
