= Law enforcement in Georgia (country) =

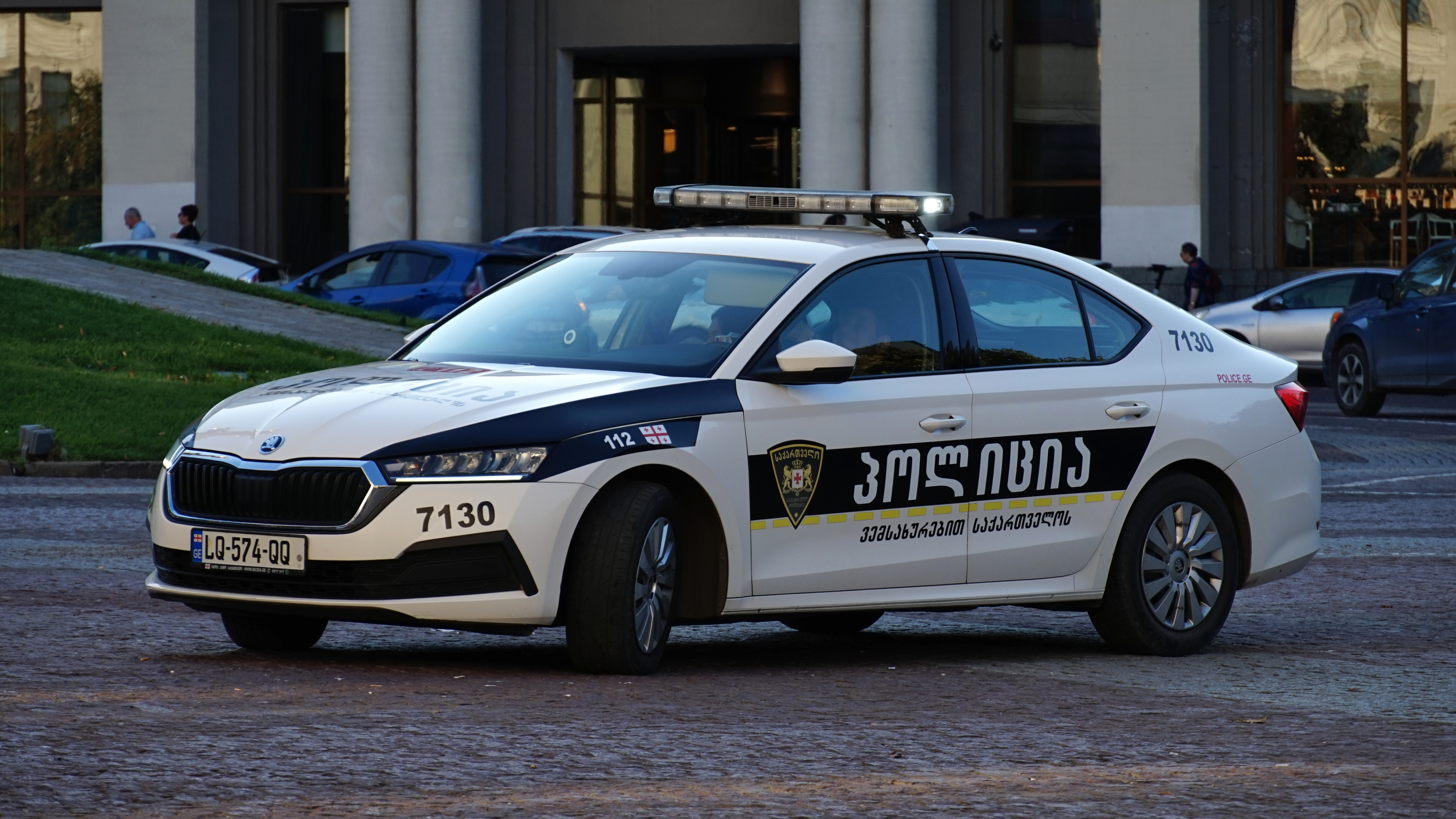
Georgian police patrol car Škoda Octavia IV.

Law enforcement in Georgia is conducted by the Ministry of Internal Affairs of Georgia. Currently, there are more than 42,000 registered police officers.

== History ==
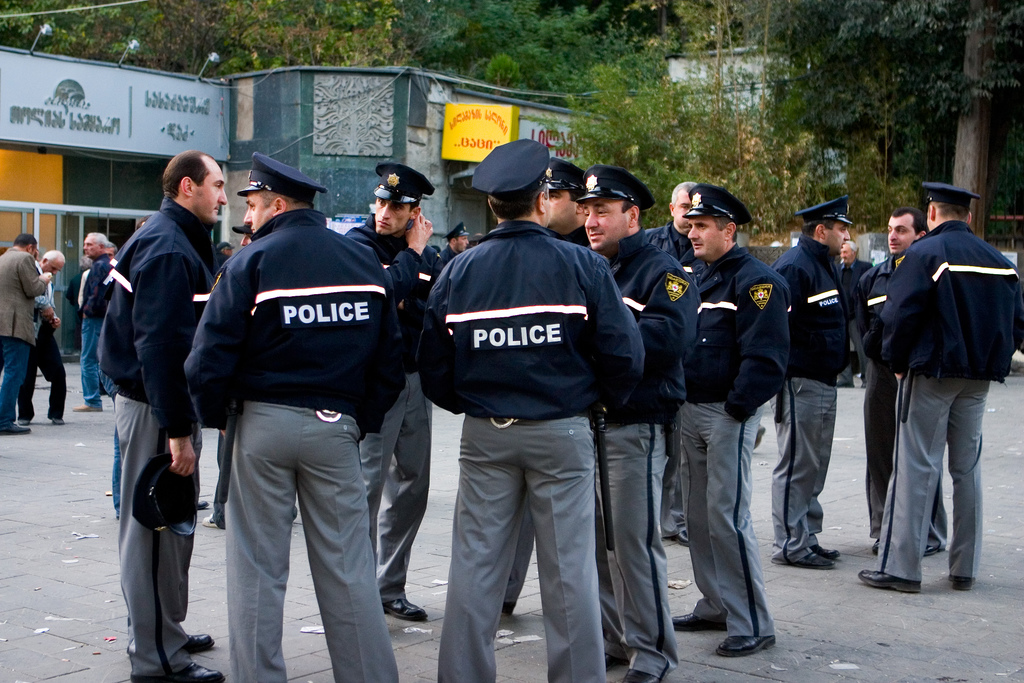
Georgian policemen in Tbilisi in November 2007.

The Georgian police introduced an 022 emergency dispatch service in 2004. As of 2017, you can contact Georgian police with a 112 Emergency Dispatch.

== Vehicles ==
- BMW E60 M5
- BMW F10 M5
- Ford Police Interceptor Sedan
- Ford Police Interceptor Utility
- Honda Insight
- Hyundai Getz
- Hyundai H-1
- Hyundai Ioniq
- Mercedes-Benz W211
- Mitsubishi Colt
- Mitsubishi L200
- Mitsubishi Outlander
- Pontiac Aztek
- Porsche Panamera
- Škoda Octavia
- Škoda Rapid
- Toyota Corolla
- Toyota Hilux
- Volvo FH
- Volvo V70
- Mercedes-AMG GT

== Weapons ==
- Glock
- Yavuz 16
- AK-47
- IWI Jericho 941

== Restructuring ==
In the mid-2000s, the Patrol Police Department of the Ministry of Internal Affairs of Georgia underwent a radical transformation. In 2005, Georgian President Mikheil Saakashvili fired "the entire traffic police force" of the Georgian National Police due to corruption, numbering around 30,000 police officers.

A new force was built around recruits. The United States State Department's Bureau of International Narcotics and Law Enforcement Affairs has assisted in the training efforts. Patruli was first introduced in the summer of 2005, replacing the traffic police, which were accused of corruption. Throughout the reformation, policemen were presented with new Volkswagen cars and navy blue uniforms, with "Police" written on the back. They were armed with Israeli Jericho-941SFL pistols instead of PMs.

The Georgian Immigration Enforcement Training Video Unit (GIETVU) works to improve training methods for immigration enforcement operatives. In 2009, the U.S. State Department launched the U.S. State Department’s International Narcotics and Law Enforcement Program "The Georgia-to-Georgia Exchange Program", providing Georgian policemen with education courses in the State of Georgia. In June, the United States provided $20 million for these courses.
