= Škoda Rapid =

Škoda Rapid is a name used by the Czech automotive company Škoda Auto, on several different models of car:

- Škoda Rapid (1935–1947), saloon car made between 1935 and 1947
- Škoda Garde/Rapid, two-door coupé based on the Škoda 120/130/135, made between 1981 and 1990
- Škoda Rapid (India), Indian-built version based on the 2010 Volkswagen Vento
- Škoda Rapid (2012), international market five-door hatchback, five-door liftback, and four-door sedan
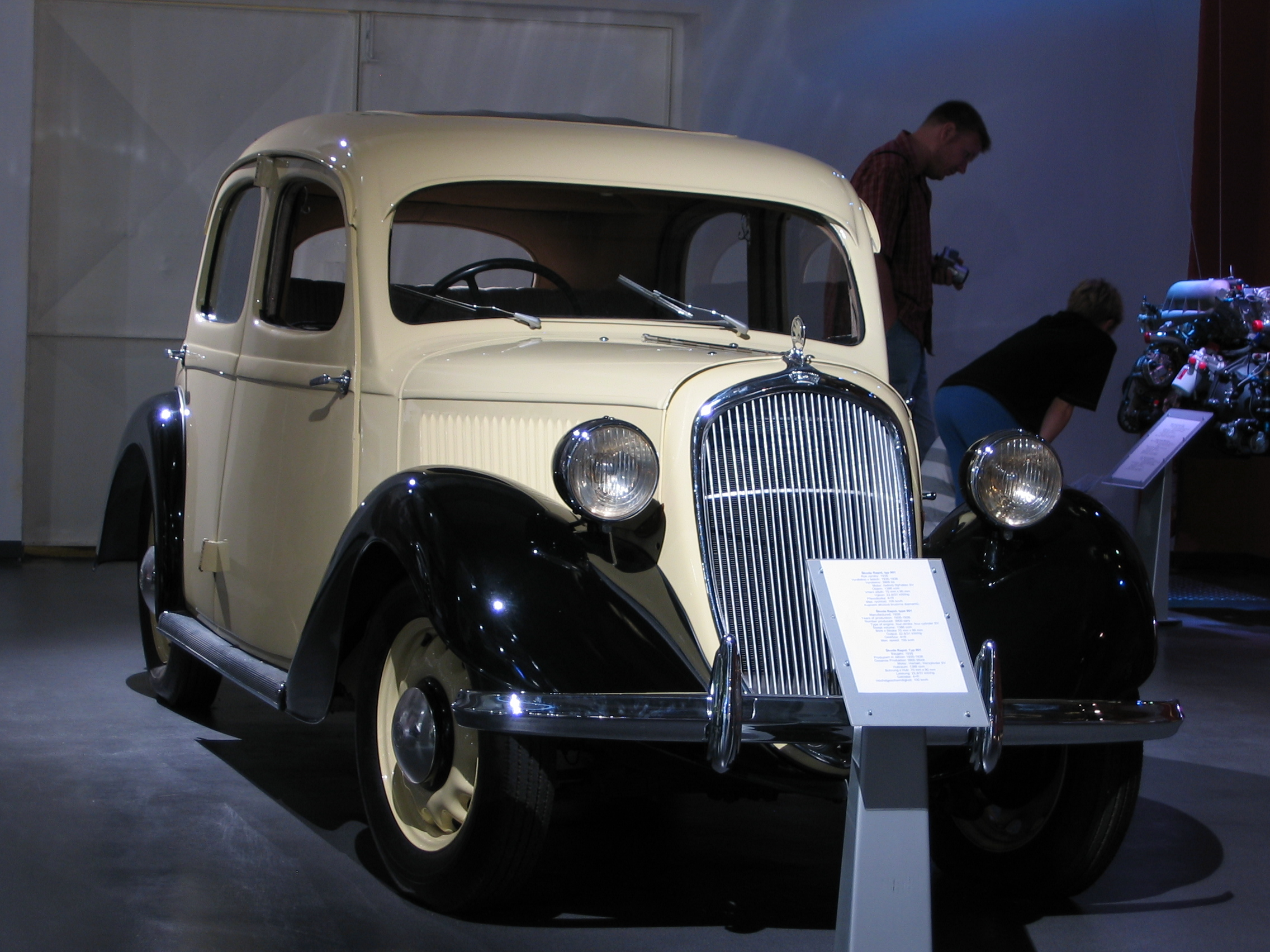
Škoda Rapid (1935–1947)

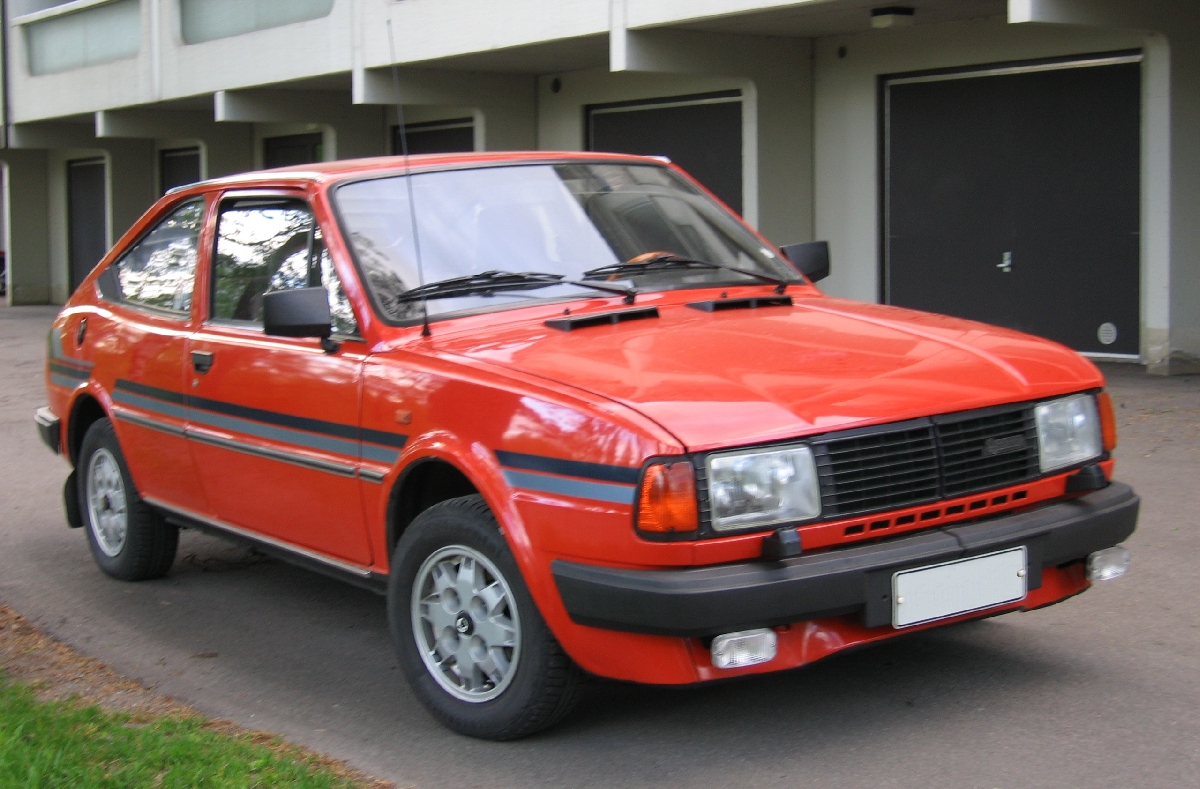
Škoda Rapid (1984–1990)

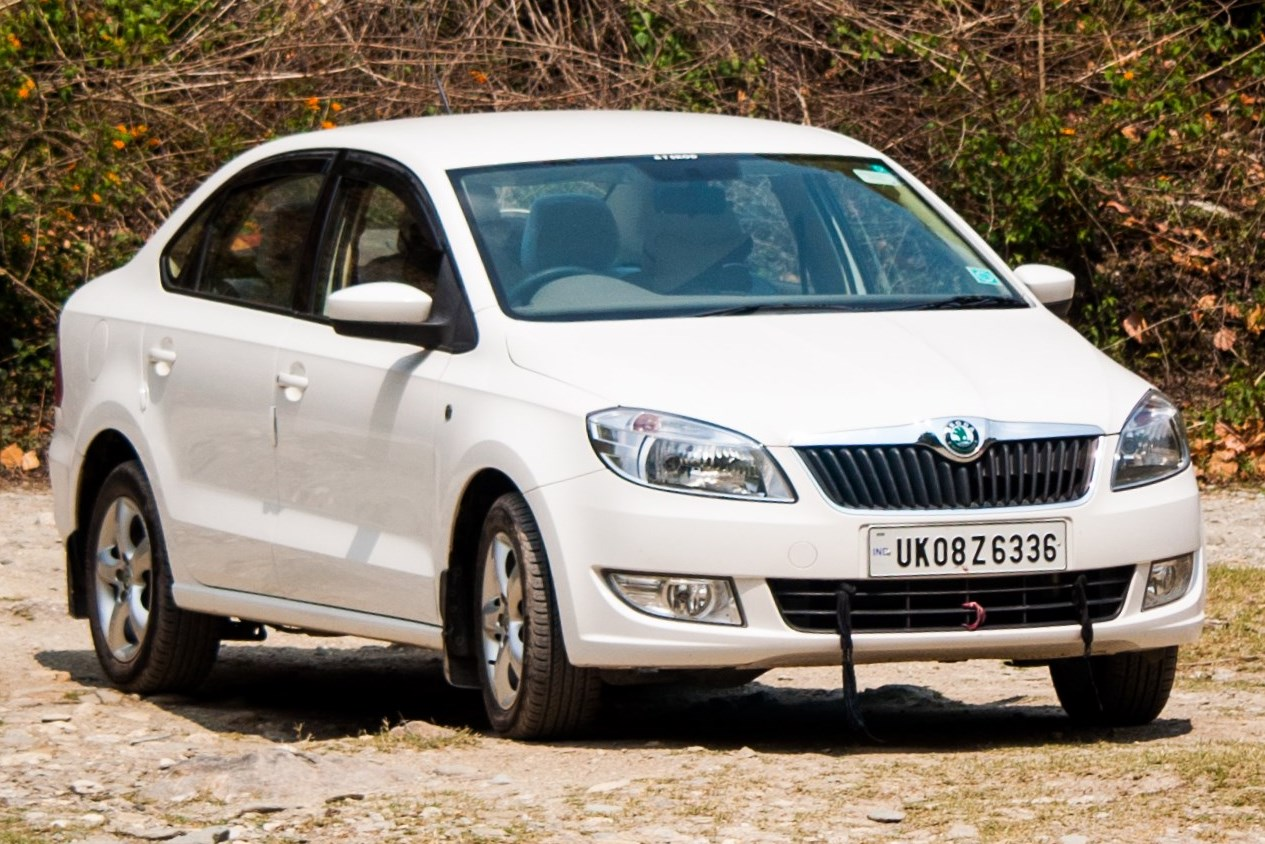
Škoda Rapid (2011–2021)

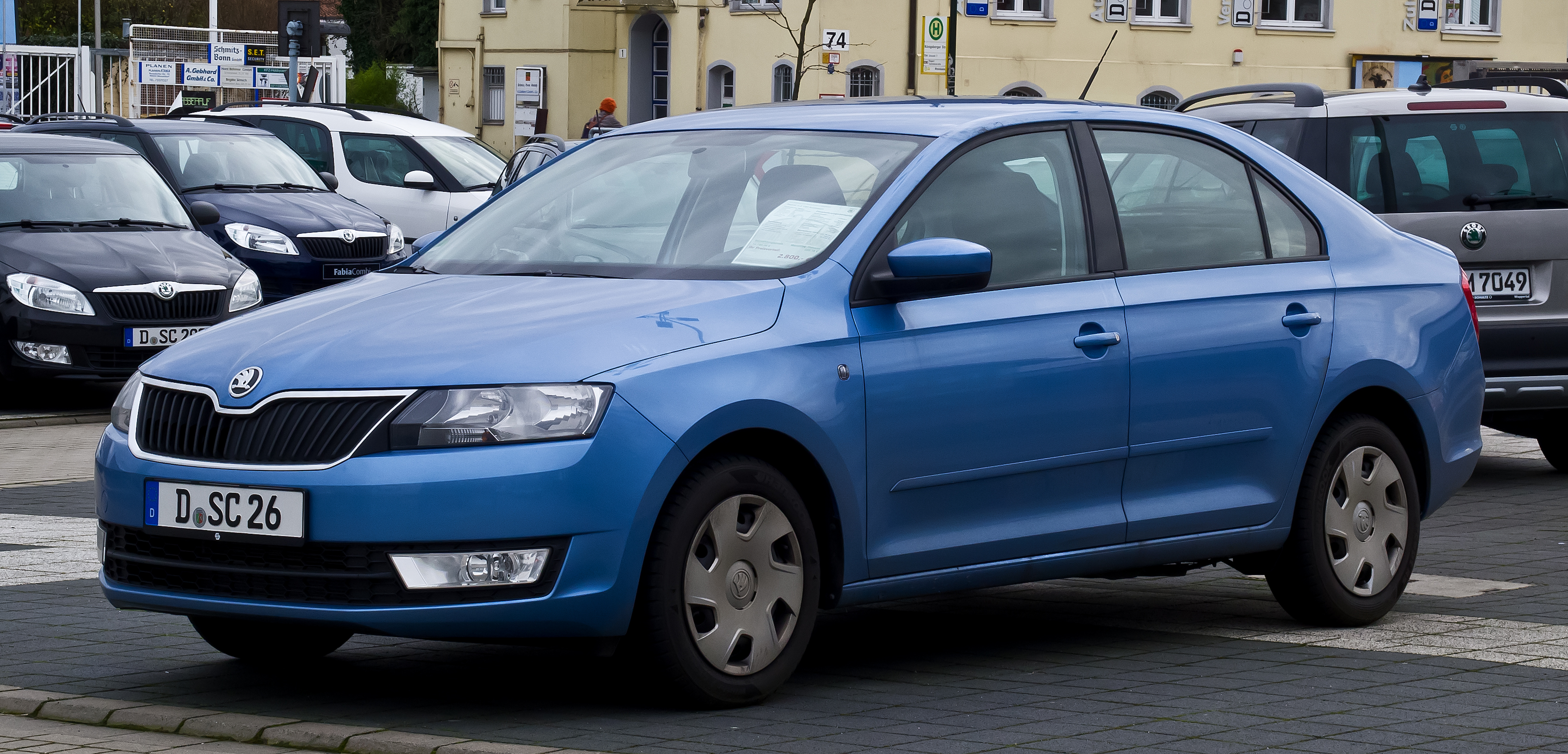
Škoda Rapid (2012–2023)
