= Eka Gigauri =

Georgian civil society leader and anti-corruption advocate

- ეკა გიგაური
- Born: 14 April 1978 (age 48); Tbilisi, Georgia
- Occupations: Executive Director, Transparency International Georgia
- Years active: 1996–present
- Known for: Anti-corruption and democracy activism

Eka Gigauri (Georgian: ეკა გიგაური; born 14 April 1978) is a Georgian civil society leader and human rights advocate. Since 2010 she has served as Executive Director of Transparency International Georgia, and has previously held roles on the Global Board of Directors of Transparency International.

She studied International Relations at Tbilisi State University, earned an MBA at the Caucasus School of Business, and an LLM in International Law from Vrije Universiteit Amsterdam. She also completed executive programmes at Stanford University’s CDDRL, and an executive course at Harvard Business School.

== Career ==
=== Early public administration and communications ===
Gigauri’s early roles included internships at the Parliament of Georgia and the Georgian Public Broadcaster, followed by assignments at the Ministry of Transport and the Ministry of Foreign Affairs.

She later worked in public relations as a Consultant at IPM (2002–2003) and as Public Affairs Coordinator at the Tbilisi Marriott Hotel (2003–2004).

=== Border security and reform (2004–2008) ===
From 2004 to 2008, she served in leadership roles at the Border Police of Georgia, including as Deputy Head. Her work focused on anti-corruption reforms, modernisation of border operations, and European integration. After leaving government service she worked as a border and migration governance expert in the Netherlands and South Caucasus.

=== Leadership at TI Georgia (2010–present) ===
Gigauri joined Transparency International Georgia in 2010 and became Executive Director soon after.

Under her leadership the organisation expanded its investigative capacity, opened regional offices, and launched civic programmes on transparency and accountability.

Her responsibilities include supervising TI Georgia’s investigations, publications, public communications and advocacy on themes including political finance, media freedom, judicial independence and public procurement.

Major investigative cases under her stewardship include:

- Investigations revealing alleged business links of Bidzina Ivanishvili and his family in Russia via offshore companies and unreported property in Moscow.
- Exposés on corruption risks in the judiciary, including politically-influenced case assignment and non-transparent judge selection.
- Analyses of party funding and procurement, including circular donor schemes and pressure on contributors to the ruling party.
- Monitoring of procurement and media finance involving pro-government media including Imedi TV.

Her leadership has helped TI Georgia become one of the most reliable civil society institutions in Georgia and a significant contributor to democratic oversight.

== Activism and civic campaigns ==
Gigauri played an active role in the Must Carry / Must Offer campaign, leading to amendments to the Georgian Law on Broadcasting that ensured pluralistic political coverage during elections.

She also helped initiate the This Affects You – They Are Still Listening campaign, which pushed for stronger rules against illegal surveillance and political wiretapping.

Since 2023, Gigauri has been one of the most visible leaders opposing Georgia’s proposed foreign agents legislation. She has warned that the bill would derail European integration, restrict civil society and stigmatise critical voices. In interviews, she emphasised compliance with EU standards and the danger of copying Russian-style legislation.

== Targeted repression and international advocacy ==
International organisations have documented political pressure on Transparency International Georgia and other civil society groups.

On 12 September 2024, Gigauri testified before the United States Senate Committee on Foreign Relations during a hearing on anti-NGO laws.

== Memberships and advisory roles ==
- Member, Board of Directors, Transparency International (two terms)
- Member, Steering Committee, Open Government Partnership (from 2022)
- Board member, Coalition for Independent and Transparent Judiciary
- Board member, Coalition for Euro-Atlantic Georgia
- Member, Presidential Pardon Commission of Georgia
- Ex officio Board Member, ICC Georgia

== See also ==
- Transparency International
- Human rights in Georgia
- Corruption in Georgia
- 2024–2025 Georgian protests

== Career ==
=== Early public administration and communications ===
Gigauri’s early roles included internships at the Parliament of Georgia and the Georgian Public Broadcaster, followed by assignments at the Ministry of Transport (Civil Aviation Department) and Ministry of Foreign Affairs (International Organisations).

She later worked in public relations: as a Public Relations Consultant at IPM (2002–2003) and as Public Affairs Coordinator at the Tbilisi Marriott Hotel (2003–2004).

=== Border security and reform (2004–2008) ===
From 2004 to 2008, she served in leadership roles at the Border Police of Georgia, including as Deputy Head. Her work focused on anti-corruption reforms, modernisation of border operations, and European cooperation. After leaving government service she worked as a border and migration governance expert in the Netherlands and the South Caucasus.

=== Leadership at TI Georgia (2010–present) ===
Gigauri joined Transparency International Georgia in 2010 and became Executive Director soon after. Under her leadership the organisation expanded its investigative capacity, opened regional offices, and launched new transparency tools and civic programmes.

Her responsibilities include supervising TI Georgia’s research, investigative reports, public communications and advocacy on themes such as political finance, media freedom, judiciary independence and public procurement. She has emphasised exposing state-capture dynamics, business-political networks, and systematically weak governance.

Major investigative cases under her stewardship include:

- Investigations revealing alleged business links of Bidzina Ivanishvili and his family in Russia, including ownership of real estate in Moscow via offshore companies.
- Exposés on corruption risks in the Georgian judiciary, including analyses of court specialisation, selection of judges, and politically-influenced decisions.
- Monitoring of procurement and media finance, such as findings on the pro-government television channel Imedi’s debts to companies linked to Ivanishvili, suggesting influence and lack of transparency.

Her leadership has helped TI Georgia become one of the most prominent civic organisations in Georgia and a major participant in democratic oversight and public accountability.

== Activism and civic campaigns ==
Gigauri has been a leading figure in Georgia’s civic movements over the past decade. She played an active role in the Must Carry / Must Offer campaign, which advocated for fair media access during elections and contributed to amendments to the Law on Broadcasting ensuring pluralistic political coverage.

She also helped initiate the This Affects You – They Are Still Listening campaign, which pushed for legal safeguards against unlawful government surveillance, intrusive data collection, and political eavesdropping practices.

Since 2023, Gigauri has been one of the most visible leaders opposing Georgia’s so-called foreign agents legislation, which sought to stigmatise and restrict independent civil society and media organisations. She led TI Georgia’s advocacy: presenting legal objections, mobilising public and international support, and warning that the legislation would threaten democratic freedoms, weaken civic space, and derail Georgia’s European integration.

Through her work with TI Georgia, she continues to speak out on corruption risks, independence of the judiciary, transparency of political finance and protection of journalists — including exposing cases of pressure on independent media outlets and efforts to silence critical broadcasting.

== Targeted repression and international advocacy ==
As civil society space in Georgia has come under increasing pressure, Gigauri and TI Georgia have faced escalating scrutiny, accusations of wrongdoing, surveillance and attempts to curtail their operations. International organisations have flagged one of TI Georgia’s key roles in documenting political capture and defending public interest.

In September 2024, she testified before the United States Senate Committee on Foreign Relations during a hearing on laws restricting NGOs. Through her international advocacy, she remains a prominent voice for Georgia’s democratic future.

== Memberships and advisory roles ==
Gigauri has held numerous elected or appointed roles in national and international structures, including:

- Member, Board of Directors, Transparency International (two terms)
- Member, Steering Committee, Open Government Partnership (from 2022)
- Board member, Coalition for Independent and Transparent Judiciary
- Board member, Coalition for Euro-Atlantic Georgia
- Member, Presidential Pardon Commission of Georgia
- Ex officio Board Member, ICC Georgia (International Chamber of Commerce – Georgia)

== See also ==
- Transparency International
- Human rights in Georgia
- Corruption in Georgia
- Media freedom in Georgia
- 2024–2025 Georgian protests

== Education ==
Gigauri graduated from Tbilisi State University in Tbilisi, Georgia in 1999 with a degree in International Relations. She continued her studies at the Caucasus School of Business, where she obtained her master's degree in Business Administration in 2001. In 2010 Gigauri completed her second Masters and received LLM from VU University Amsterdam in the Netherlands.

In addition to degree programs in 2007 she attended the Senior Executive Seminar Course at George C. Marshall European Center for Security Studies.

In 2017 Eka Gigauri became the fellow of Stanford University CDDRL (Center on Democracy, Development and the Rule of law) "Draper Hills Fellows Program on Democracy and Development".

== Career ==
=== Early career ===
Gigauri started her career in 1996 as an intern in the Parliament of Georgia and Georgian Public Broadcaster. She continued her early work with the Georgian government as an Officer in the International Relations Office in the Ministry of Transport of Georgia (Civil Aviation Department) during 1998 and 1999. She then worked in the Department of International Organizations, UN Office, at the Ministry of Foreign Affairs of Georgia.

=== Public Relations and Marketing ===
Gigauri started working in PR and marketing in 2002, when she joined the Institute of Polling and Marketing as a Public Relations Consultant. Later, in 2003 she was hired by Marriott International as a Public Affairs Coordinator in Tbilisi.

=== Border Security ===
In 2004, Gigauri joined the public service and became the Head of Border Policy Provision Department in the Border Police of Georgia. She was promoted in 2005 to Deputy Head of the Border Police. She oversaw modernization of the force and cleaned up corruption. She also participated in negotiations with the EU on European Neighborhood Policy Action Plan (ENP AP). Gigauri worked on a long-term development strategy for the Georgian Border Police, as well as the enactment of the Integrated Border Management Strategy and the State Law on Border Police of Georgia.

In the following years, Gigauri worked as an expert at Caucasus Interconnect in the Hague, Netherlands. She provided recommendations in the field of security, including border security and migration in South Caucasian countries.

=== Transparency International Georgia ===
Since November 2010, Gigauri has been serving as the executive director at Transparency International Georgia (TI Georgia).

Under Gigauri's leadership TI Georgia greatly expanded both in terms of the people employed, but also in terms of donor funding attracted. Respectively, the portfolio of activities and projects of the organization was also increased.

== Activism ==
Gigauri has been actively involved in various civic activism movements, including "Must Carry/Must Offer," which was eventually adopted into the Georgian Law on Broadcasting (Article 40)14. She was also one of the founders of the campaign "This affects you- They Are Still Listening," which petitioned the Georgian government to legislate against illegal surveillance.

== Memberships ==
- 2015–Present, Ex Officio Board Member of International Chamber of Commerce (ICC Georgia)
- 2015–2018, Member of the Civil Society Platform under the EU-Georgia Association Agreement
- 2014–Present, board member of the Coalition for Independent and Transparent Judiciary
- 2016–Present, board member of the Coalition for Euro-Atlantic Georgia
- 2014–2016, board member of Georgian International Arbitration Center (GIAC)
- 2013–2018, Member of pardon commission under the President of Georgia
- 2013 - Member of commission for selection of the members of central election commission
- 2013–2014, Supervisory Board Member of Municipal Development Fund of Georgia
- 2010–Present, Member of Georgia's National Anti-Corruption Council

== Noteworthy Publications ==
- Russian Border Regions - the social and political aspects of the existed problem (Co-author, 2006)
- So what about the NATO-Georgia relation? (Opinion in dfwatch.net 2012)
- NGOs’ proposal: concrete step towards fair elections (Opinion in dfwatch.net 2012)
- Is Georgia's government still trying to improve the investment climate? (Opinion in dfwatch.net 2012)
- Is Georgia a part of, or apart from, the Open Government Partnership? (Opinion in dfwatch.net 2012)
- Risk of corruption in Georgia (Opinion in dfwatch.net 2012)
