= George Gigauri =

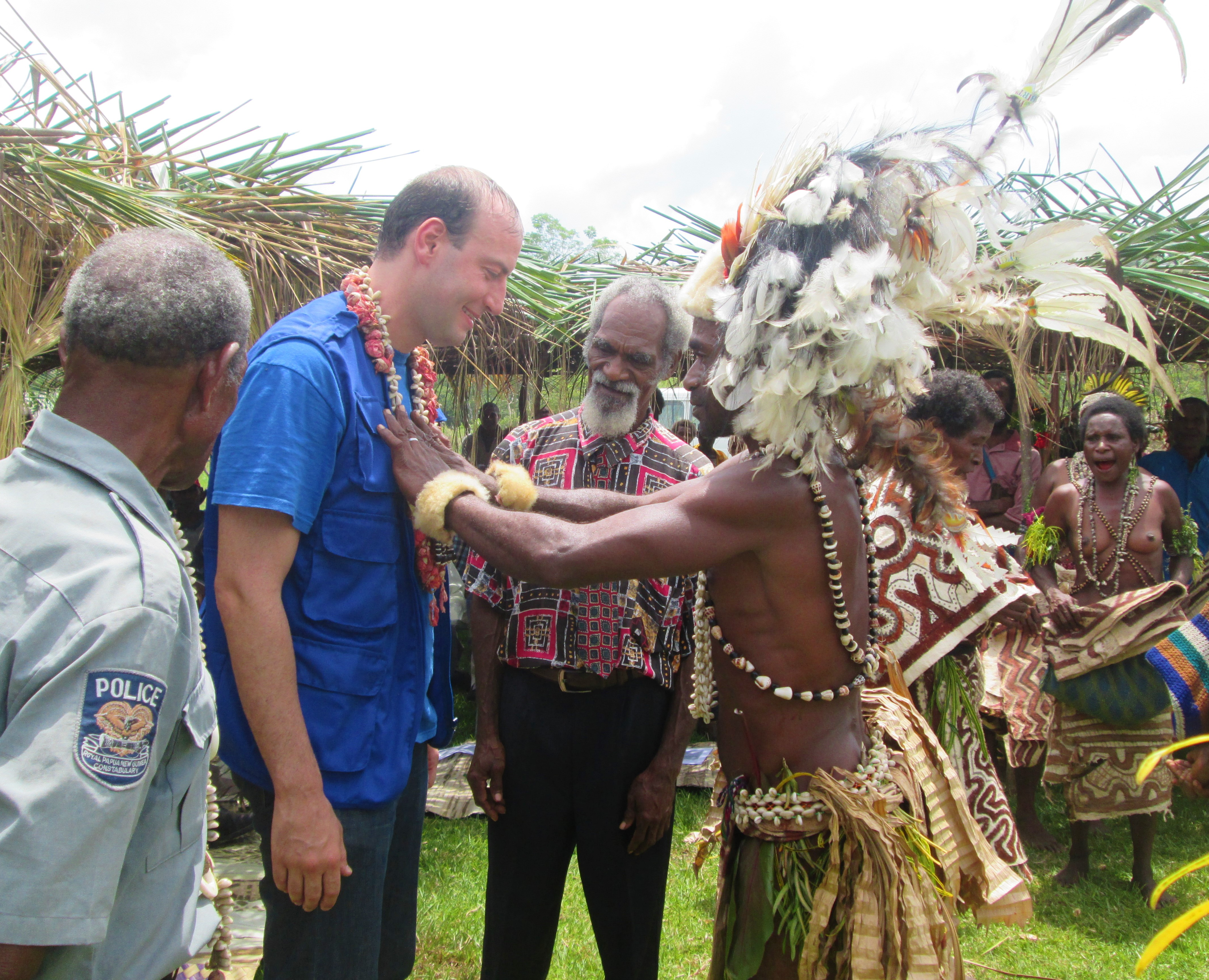
- George Gigauri being inaugurated as honorary tribal chief in Oro Province, Papua New Guinea (2014)
- Born: USSR
- Education: Christ's College, Cambridge; St Antony's College, Oxford
- Occupation: Humanitarian Coordinator
- Organization: United Nations

George Gigauri or Giorgi Gigauri (Georgian: გიორგი გიგაური) is a Special Advisor and former United Nations official with over 20 years of experience in humanitarian and development work.

== Early life and education ==
George Gigauri was born in the Soviet Union. He is the son of Georgian scientist Vladimir Gigauri. Through his maternal family, he is a descendant of Georgian general and nobleman Count (tavadi, თავადი) Nestor Gardapkhadze (1867–1924), who led the 1921 anti-Soviet uprising in Svaneti and later participated in the August Uprising of 1924. Gigauri was educated at Battle Abbey School, an independent boarding school in East Sussex, England. He obtained postgraduate degrees from Christ's College, Cambridge and St Antony's College, Oxford. While studying at Oxford, he founded the Oxford University Georgian Society in 2003.

== Pembroke College, University of Oxford ==
In 2025, Gigauri joined Pembroke College, Oxford, as a Visiting Fellow with the Global Security Programme. His research focuses on the humanitarian–development–peace nexus in post-conflict settings.

== United Nations ==
=== Iraq ===
From 2021 to 2025, Gigauri served as Chief of Mission of the International Organization for Migration (IOM) in Iraq, leading one of the IOM's largest country operations. He oversaw a workforce of more than 1,000 staff and managed an annual programme portfolio exceeding US$150 million. Under his leadership, IOM Iraq expanded its stabilization, peacebuilding, and migration-governance activities across all governorates, supporting the recovery and reintegration of conflict-affected communities. He secured significant international funding for post-conflict reconstruction, spearheaded private-sector partnerships and job creation (over 15,000 jobs), as well as chairing the UN Durable Solutions Taskforce to develop long-term policy frameworks for internally displaced persons and returnees. His tenure marked the transition from humanitarian response toward sustainable development, emphasizing local ownership, economic resilience, and institutional reform.

=== Bangladesh ===
At IOM Bangladesh, he was overseeing a programme portfolio, which includes humanitarian emergencies, with primary focus on the Rohingya crisis, migrant protection, policy and governance, migration and development, and economic reintegration. He was one of the three Co-Chairs, with UNHCR and the UN Resident Coordinator, of the Strategic Coordination Group (SEG) which oversees and manages the 2015 Rohingya refugee crisis response in Bangladesh, which is the largest refugee camp in the world. He was also the Coordinator of the United Nations Migration Network that brings together key UN agencies and civil society partners working on migration policy and development in the country. Over 2020–2021, he was the IOM Crisis Management Team Leader for the COVID-19 pandemic public health emergency programmes and the UN Inter-Agency Co-Lead for Points of Entry operations in the country.

=== Papua New Guinea ===
Gigauri served as the IOM Chief of Mission in Papua New Guinea from 2013 - 2016, leading programmes in disaster management, community stabilization, and border management. He led IOM crisis response during the drought of 2015–16 in the Highlands, joint counter human trafficking operation in the Dogleg area of Papua New Guinea (Torres Straights), and various peacebuilding initiatives in local conflict affected areas of the country.

=== Other Countries ===
During his tenure as the IOM Deputy Chief of Mission in Indonesia, he spearheaded a humanitarian effort leading to release of thousands of refugees from detention across the country. His prior assignments include Head of Programme Support in Ukraine, Project Development Officer in Moldova, and research support at the Regional Office in Austria. He has led numerous emergency response surge teams in Asia-Pacific, including in Fiji, Tonga, and Vanuatu.

== Other ==
He is a contributor to international publications, including The Daily Star, the Bangkok Post, UN Migration Weblog, and Cambridge Judge Business School. Gigauri was inaugurated as an honorary tribal chief in Oro, Papua New Guinea in 2014.
