= Škoda Rapid (India) =

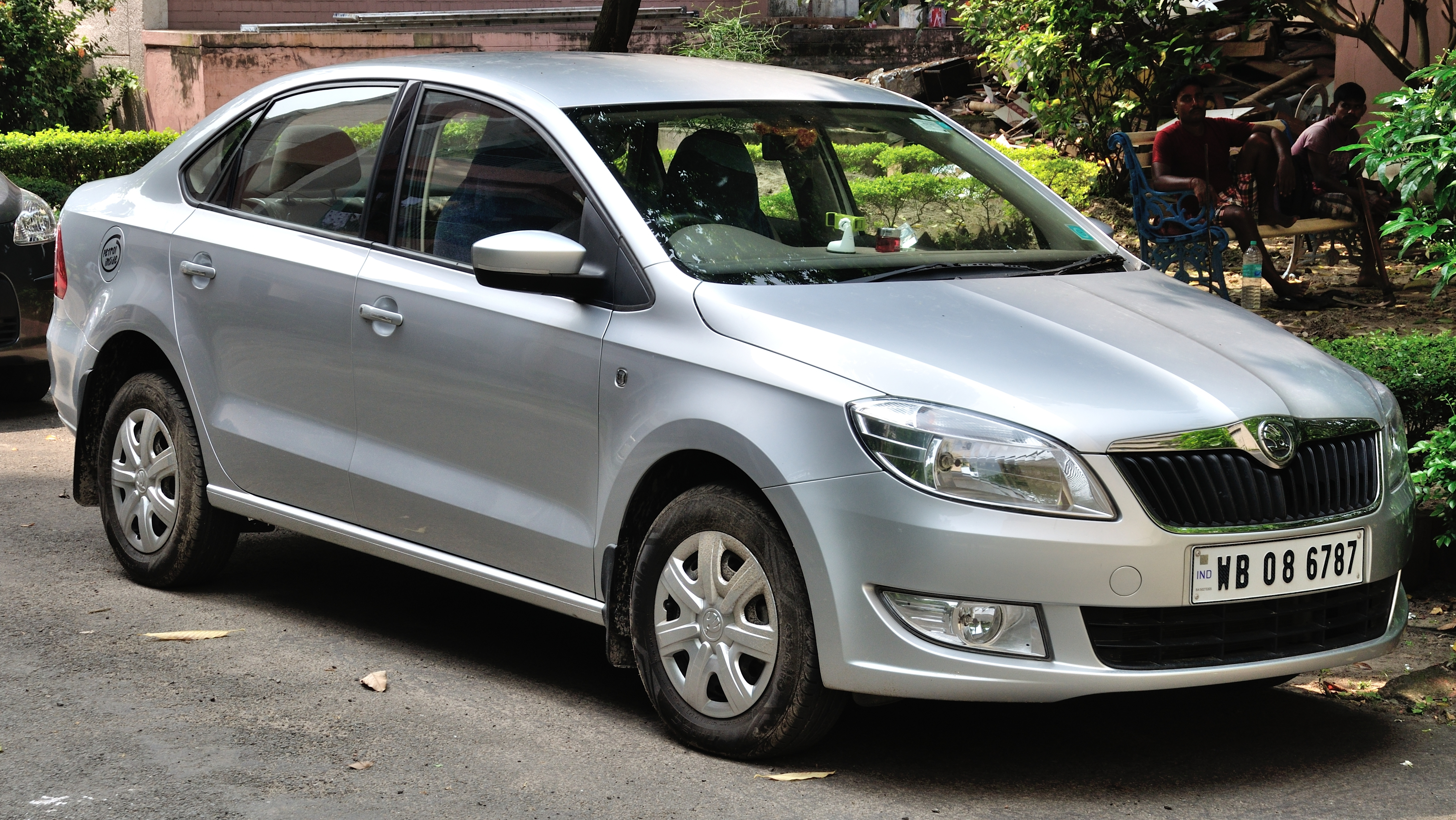

Overview
- Manufacturer: Škoda Auto
- Also called: Volkswagen Vento; Volkswagen Polo sedan
- Production: 2009–2021
- Assembly: India: Aurangabad (Škoda VW India)

Body and chassis
- Class: Subcompact car (B)
- Body style: 4-door sedan
- Layout: Front-engine, front-wheel-drive
- Platform: Volkswagen Group A05 (PQ25) platform
- Related: Volkswagen Polo (Mk5); Škoda Fabia (Mk2)

Powertrain
- Engine: 1.0 L TSI (petrol); 1.6 L I4 MPI (petrol); 1.5 L I4 TDI CR (diesel)
- Transmission: 5-speed manual 7-speed DSG; 6-speed automatic

Dimensions
- Wheelbase: 2,552 mm (100.5 in)
- Length: 5,467 mm (215.2 in)
- Width: 1,699 mm (66.9 in)
- Height: 1,466 mm (57.7 in)

Chronology
- Successor: Škoda Slavia

The Škoda Rapid is a subcompact sedan car produced by Czech manufacturer Škoda Auto exclusively for the Indian market, introduced in November 2011 and manufactured until 2021.

The "Rapid" name was previously used in the 1930s for the Rapid (Type 901) and in the 1980s for the rear-engine Rapid coupé, and was also used for a larger sedan and hatchback for the European and Chinese market.

== Overview ==
In October 2011, Škoda resurrected the Rapid nameplate for a rebadged version of the Volkswagen Vento, also made in India, with sales starting in November. The Rapid features a similar rear end design with the Vento, except for the taillights, but shares the front end design with the second-generation Škoda Fabia, to which however it is not directly related, the Rapid being based on the newer PQ25 platform of the Volkswagen Group. The car is produced by Indian subsidiary Škoda Auto India Private Limited in Pune.

The interior design of the Rapid is similar to its Volkswagen counterpart, apart from the Škoda family steering wheel, instrument panel, gear-lever and audio system. The central console has vents, buttons and climate control adapted from VW; the audio system, with its large buttons and fonts, is designed by Škoda. The Rapid includes features such as an information centre, driver assist, audio system with audio input for portable media players and SD/MMC data card reader, adjustable seats, headrests, armrests, tilt steering.

The Rapid became a popular premium sedan in the car market of India, and was voted Family Car of the Year by the Indian edition Top Gear magazine in December 2011. After 10 years, Skoda decided to discontinue Rapid model, with the Slavia Model slated to take its place.

=== Related models ===
The European model of the ŠKODA Rapid is based on the Škoda MissionL concept car, and was launched in 2012. It is, however, a different design, slightly longer, with different interiors, a slightly different body shape, and different engine options. It was shown in premiere at the Paris Motor Show in September 2012.

=== Engines ===
An overview of engines available for the Indian-market Rapid follows.

Petrol engines

Engine designation	Production	Engine code (family)	Displacement, configuration, valvetrain, fuel system, aspiration	Motive power at rpm	max. torque at rpm	Gearbox (type), drive	Top speed [km/h]	0–100 km/h [s] (0–62 mph)	Combined consumption [l/100 km / mpg imp / mpg US]	CO2 [g/km]
1.6 MPI 77 kW	2011–	(EA111)	1598 ccm, I4, 16V DOHC, naturally aspirated	77 kW (105 PS; 103 hp) at 5250 rpm	153 Nm. (113 lb•ft) at 3800 rpm	5-speed manual	N/A	N/A	6.7 / 42.4 / 35.3	N/A
1.6 MPI 77 kW	2011–	(EA111)	1598 ccm, I4, 16V DOHC, naturally aspirated	77 kW (105 PS; 103 hp) at 5250 rpm	153 Nm. (113 lb•ft) at 3800 rpm	6-speed automatic	N/A	N/A	7.0 / 40.4 / 33.6	N/A
1.0 TSI 81 kW	2020 - 2021	(EA211)	999 ccm, I3, 12V DOHC, turbocharged	81 kW (110 PS; 109 hp) at 5000 rpm	175 Nm (129 lb.ft) at 1750 rpm	6-speed manual, 5-speed automatic	200 KMPH / 125 MPH	10.09s (4.36s)	5.2 / 53.6 / 44.6	N/A

Diesel engines

Engine designation	Production	Engine code (family)	Displacement, configuration, valvetrain, fuel system, aspiration	Motive power at rpm	max. torque at rpm	Gearbox (type), drive	Top speed [km/h]	0–100 km/h [s] (0–62 mph)	Combined consumption [l/100 km / mpg imp / mpg US]	CO2 [g/km]
1.6 TDI CR 77 KW	2011–2014	CLNA (EA189)	1598 ccm, I4, 16V DOHC, common-rail, turbocharged	77 kW (105 PS; 103 hp) at 4400 rpm	250 Nm (184 lb•ft) at 1500–2500 rpm	5-speed manual	N/A	N/A	5.1 / 55.1 / 45.9	N/A
1.5 TDI CR 77 KW	2014–	CWXB (EA189)	1498 ccm, I4, 16V DOHC, common-rail, turbocharged	77 kW (105 PS; 103 hp) at 4400 rpm	250 Nm (184 lb•ft) at 1500–2500 rpm	5-speed manual	N/A	N/A	4.7 / 59.7 / 49.7	N/A
1.5 TDI CR 77 KW	2014–	CWXB (EA189)	1498 ccm, I4, 16V DOHC, common-rail, turbocharged	77 kW (105 PS; 103 hp) at 4400 rpm	250 Nm (184 lb•ft) at 1500–2500 rpm	7-speed automatic	N/A	N/A	4.6 / 61.2 / 50.9	N/A

== Facelift ==
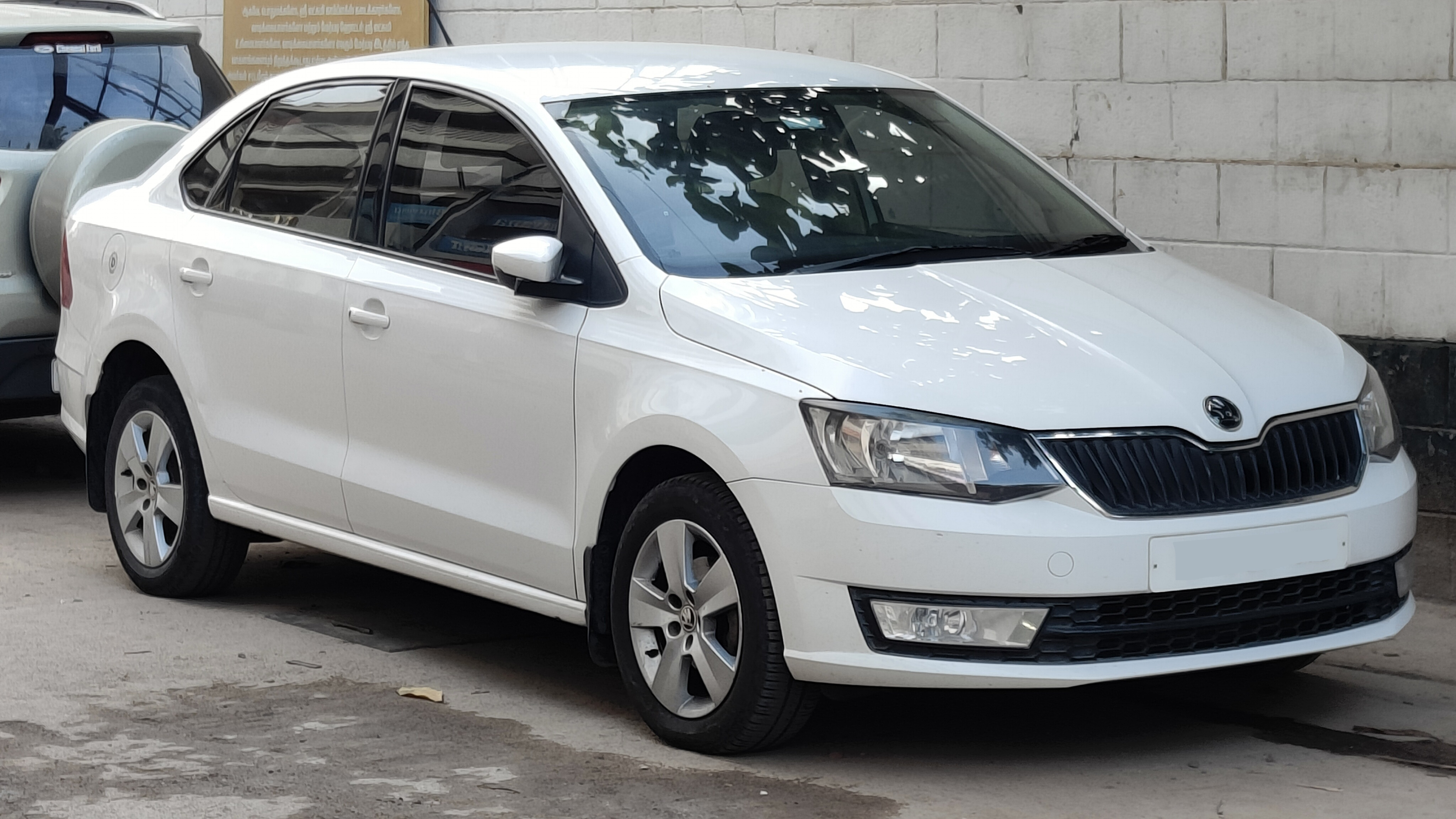

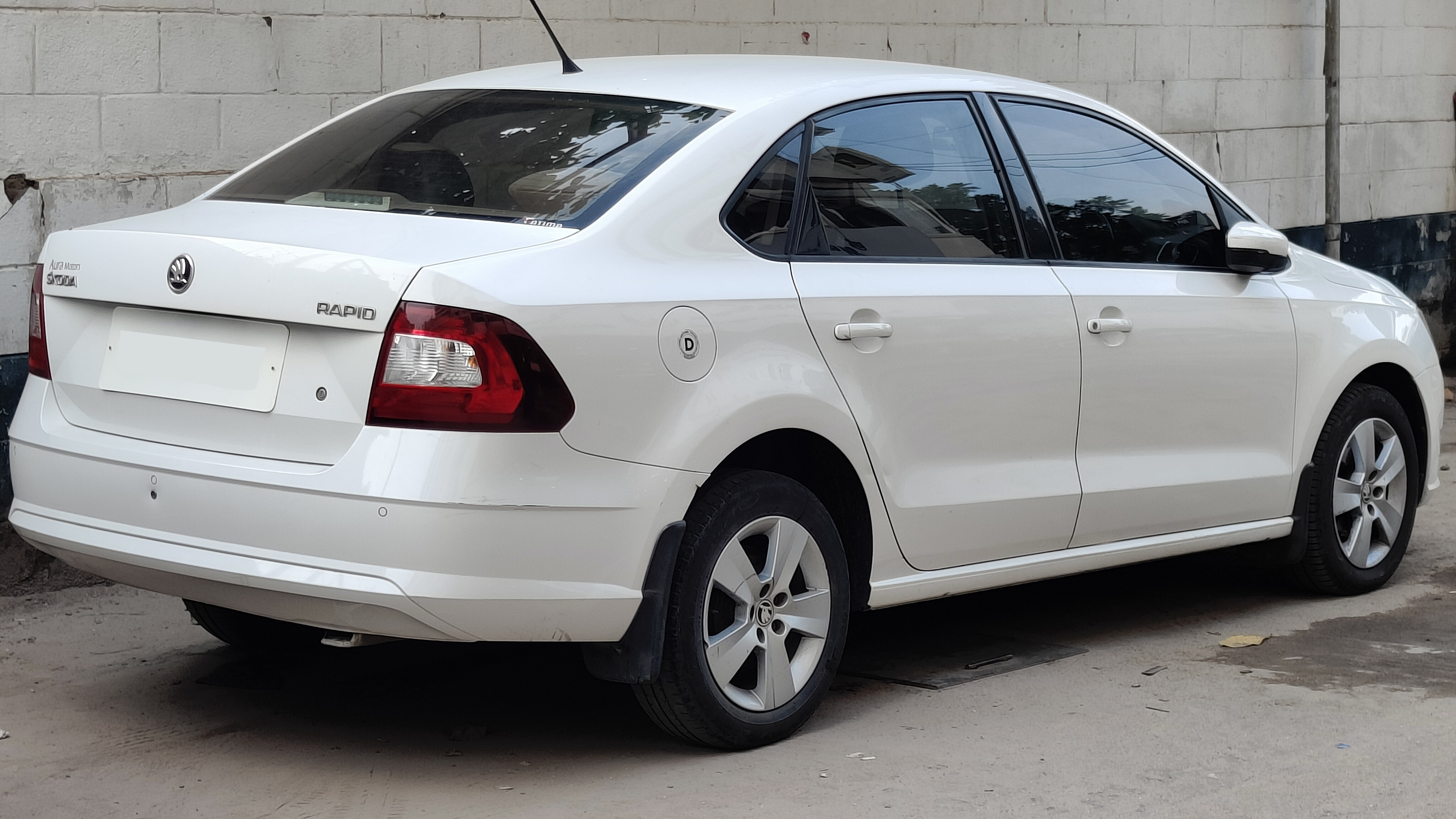
2019 Skoda Rapid (facelift)

The Rapid received a facelift for the 2017 model year, which brought its styling in line with Škoda's newer design language. The updated model was launched in November 2016, with an array of changes intended to enhance its appeal and increase the sales volumes.

The 2017 Skoda Rapid facelift comes with revised styling that makes it look sharper. New exterior changes include new front grille, headlamps, chrome door handles, smoked out tail lamps, etc. Some of the new features include cruise control, rain sensing wipers, reach and rake adjustable steering, cooled glovebox and footwell lighting. According to MotorBeam, 0–100 km/h acceleration for the diesel DSG is claimed to be 10.7 seconds with a 190.8 km/h top speed, with the manual taking 10.3 seconds with a top speed of 200 km/h.

=== Exterior ===
The facelifted Škoda Rapid received a new front fascia with a new radiator grille surrounded by a chrome finished frame and a new angular design for the headlights. It also received sharper bumpers with a large honeycomb air intake that further enhances the sharper and bolder appeal, while fog lamps are placed on either side of the air intake. The new updated Rapid also comes endowed with some mild updates on its rear design. The updates on the car's back design include a restyled bumper and a new chrome strip on the car's boot lid. Skoda has also endowed a new boot lip spoiler and revised tail lamps to offer a fresher look for the rear façade of the facelift Rapid. The side profile of the sedan remains unchanged, excepting for the redesigned alloy wheels. The range topping variants of the sedan also offers LED daytime running lights which are integrated to the dual barrel headlamp setup of the car.

=== Interior ===
The cabin of the Rapid has also been improved with some upgrades and changes to match its fresher exterior. The sedan also gets some added features such as cruise control system, light sensing automatic headlamps and rain sensing automatic wipers. The top-of-the-line variant of the Rapid sedan offers a 6.5-inch touchscreen integrated infotainment system that comes along with MirrorLink feature that allows one to put all the smartphone content on to the automobile's display. There are also the standard connectivity options such as AUX, USB and Bluetooth. Other features include Automatic Climate Control, Multi-function Steering Wheel and more.

=== Engine and transmission ===
The Skoda Rapid is offered for sale in India in both petrol and diesel versions. The new updated Skoda Rapid's petrol gets powered by the familiar 1.6-liter petrol motor that has the capability to generate a maximum power output of 105 bhp along with 153 Nm of top torque. The petrol engine gets equipped with a 5-speed manual transmission gearbox as well as a 6-speed automatic transmission gearbox.

The Rapid facelift has come equipped with a new diesel engine, which is its primary attraction for the diesel version. The sedan comes powered by a new 1.5 liter 4-cylinder, turbocharged diesel engine that can deliver a peak power output of 109 Bhp along with 250 Nm of torque. This diesel mill is also paired with a standard 5 speed manual transmission gearbox, while it also offers the choice of a 7 speed DSG transmission gearbox.

== Mileage ==
The Skoda Rapid petrol offers a fuel efficiency of a maximum 14.3 km per liter on the automatic transmission and 15 km per liter on the manual transmission variants. On the other hand, for the diesel version the company claims a mileage of 21.13 km per liter on the automatic transmission variant and 21.72 km per liter on the manual transmission model.
