= Volkswagen Polo Sedan (A05) =

Subcompact sedan

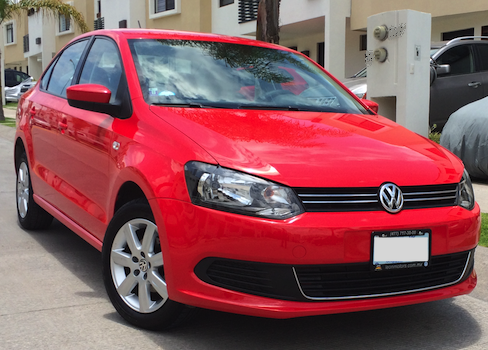
- 2014 Volkswagen Vento

Overview
- Manufacturer: Volkswagen
- Also called: Volkswagen Vento; Škoda Rapid (India)
- Production: 2010–2022
- Assembly: India: Chakan (Škoda Auto Volkswagen India); Russia: Kaluga (LLC Volkswagen Group Rus Kaluga Plant); Malaysia: Pekan (HICOM)

Body and chassis
- Class: Subcompact car
- Body style: 4-door sedan
- Layout: Front-engine, front-wheel-drive
- Platform: Volkswagen Group A05 (PQ25) platform
- Related: Volkswagen Ameo; Volkswagen Polo Mk5

Dimensions
- Wheelbase: 2,553 mm (100.5 in)
- Length: 4,390 mm (172.8 in)
- Width: 1,699 mm (66.9 in)
- Height: 1,467 mm (57.8 in)
- Curb weight: 1,126–1,238 kg (2,482–2,729 lb)

Chronology
- Successor: Volkswagen Virtus; Volkswagen Polo (CK) (Russia)

The Volkswagen Polo Sedan (or Volkswagen Vento in some markets) is a subcompact car produced by the Volkswagen India and Volkswagen Russia subsidiaries of the German manufacturer Volkswagen from 2010 to 2022. It is essentially a three-box Volkswagen Polo with a stretched wheelbase and has been developed especially for some markets.

The car was sold under the Vento nameplate in India, Malaysia, Brunei and Mexico. The name Vento means 'wind' in both Italian and Portuguese. In South Africa, Argentina, Russia, Jordan, Morocco, Algeria, Tunisia and the Middle East, it is sold as the Volkswagen Polo Sedan. It is also known as the Volkswagen Polo Notch in the Philippines.

== Overview ==
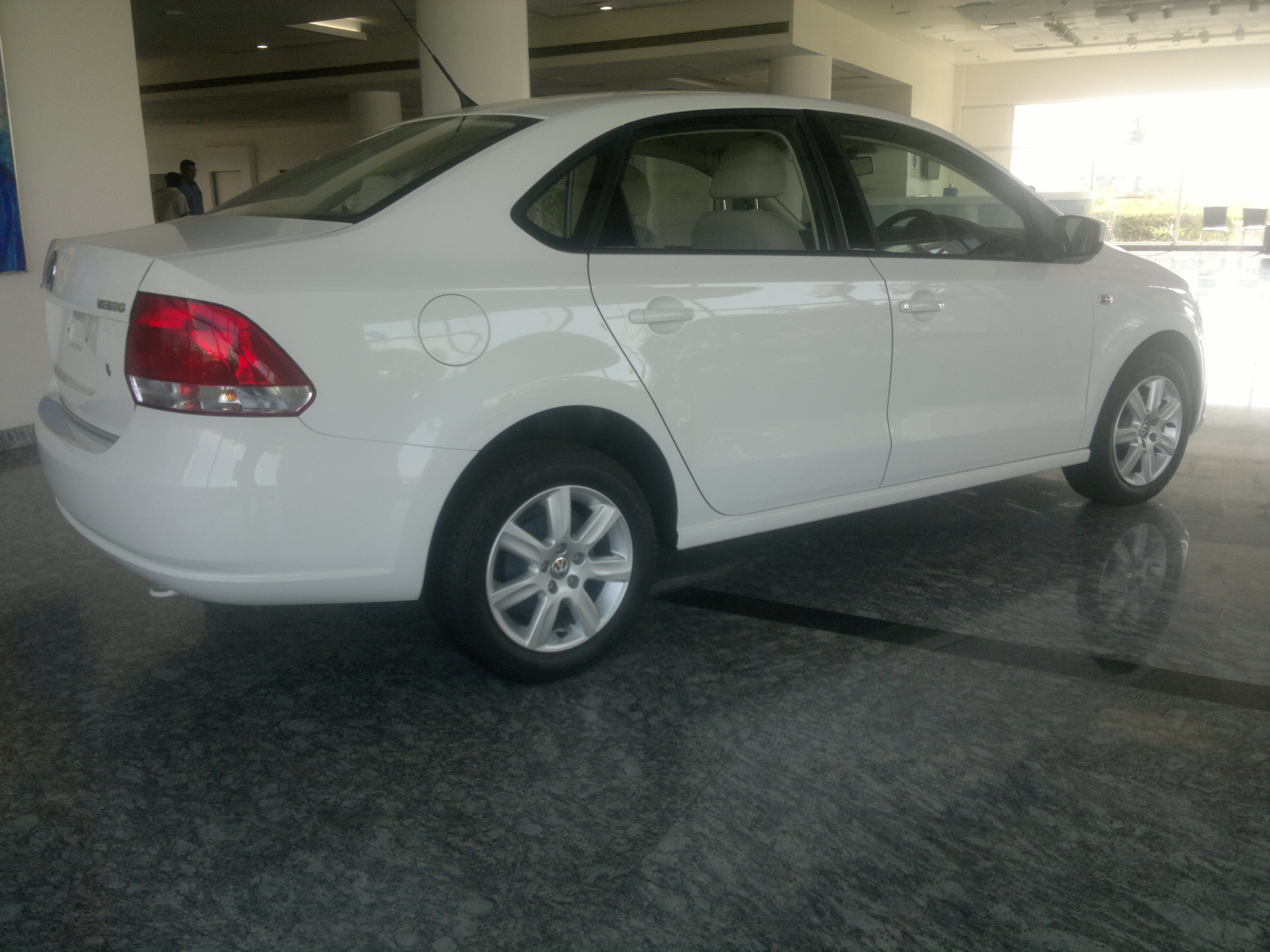
Volkswagen Vento (Rear view, India)

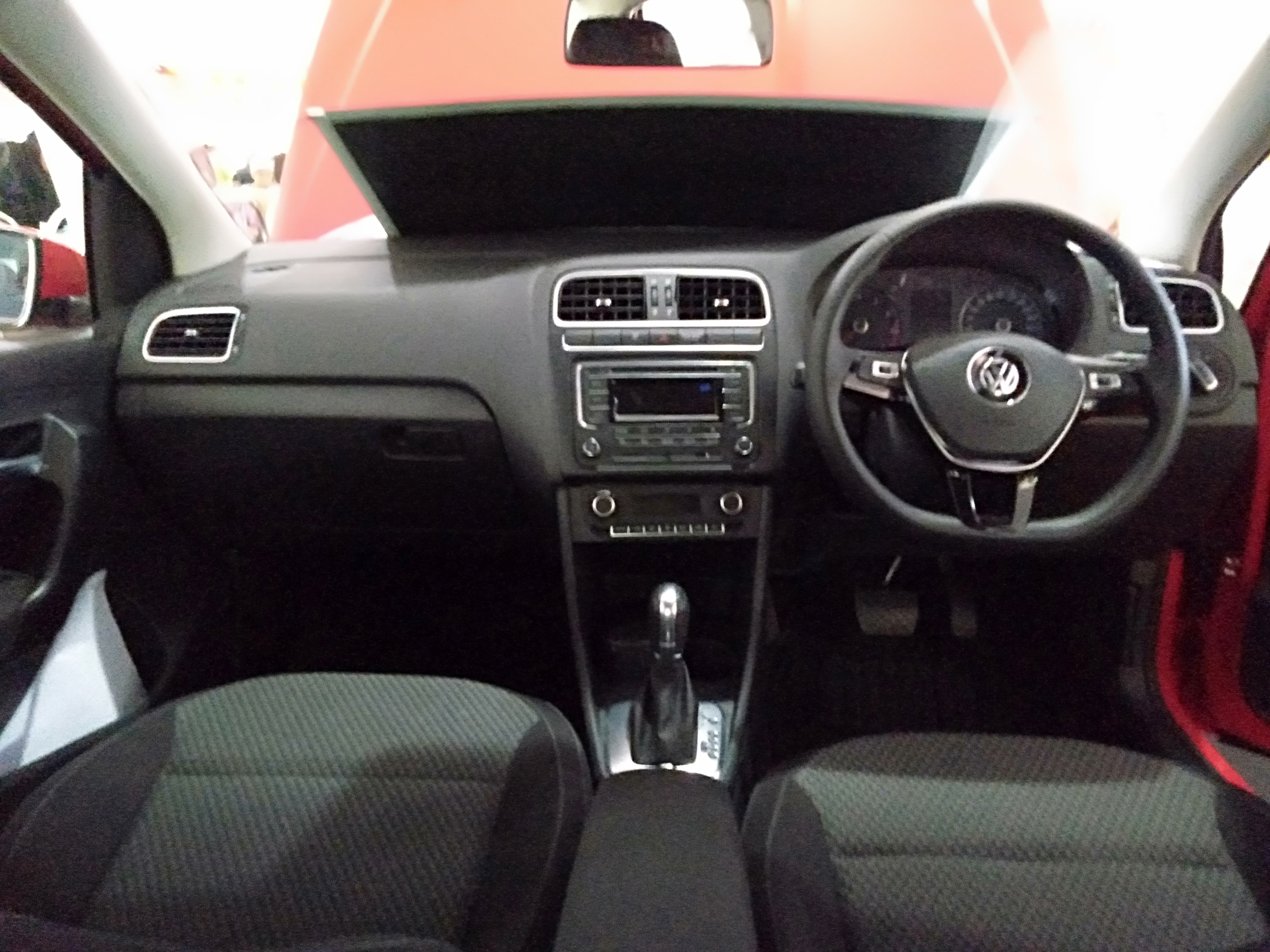
Interior (Brunei)

Technically, the car is based on a stretched version of the Volkswagen Polo Mk5 Facelift (Typ 6C; 2014–2017). Related Volkswagen Group models include the Škoda Fabia, SEAT Ibiza and Audi A1. This car is made based under A05 (PQ25) Platform. PQ25 is a development of the PQ24 platform with the possibility of all-wheel drive (not included on any version), informally known as A05.

The extra wheelbase offers more rear legroom than the hatchback, 50mm additional wheelbase and 500-liters of boot space, which has been well received. VW offers a choice of four engine options in India and Mexico; a 1.6 litre MPI petrol engine mated only to a five-speed manual transmission, a 1.6 litre TDI high torque diesel engine mated only to a five-speed manual gearbox, a 1.5 litre TDI high torque diesel engine mated to a five-speed manual gearbox or a seven-speed automatic gearbox in the Indian market. There is also a 1.2 litre TSI engine available with a seven-speed DSG automatic gearbox only.

The car in India is available in four trim levels: the Trendline, Comfortline, Highline and Highline Plus, with the Highline and Highline Plus also having an automatic option. Among the four variants, the Trendline is a bare-bones trim level, forming an entry point for the vehicle. The Comfortline gets a CD-MP3 music system, body-coloured door mirrors and handles and fog lamps among other features. The Highline features a Touchscreen Infotainment system with integrated USB music, steering-mounted audio controls, leather upholstery, ABS, front airbags, a multi-function display, 15" alloy wheels and other standard features. The Highline Plus has 16” alloy wheels, a reverse parking camera and full LED headlamps with LED daytime running lights.

The Volkswagen Vento 1.6 MPI petrol variant offers a fuel efficiency of about 13 km/L in the city and about 15.8 km/L on the highway. The diesel variant of the Vento gives a mileage of about 17.5 km/L in the city and nearly 22 km/L on the highway.

In 2011, VW introduced a temporary special edition "Breeze" on the Trendline, featuring new, nifty features and added accessories. Besides the "Breeze', Volkswagen India, in collaboration with the IPL authorities, annually offers a special IPL edition at a slight premium.

In March 2011, Volkswagen recorded an impressive sales figure of 3973 units, dethroning the Honda City for the first time since its launch. Overall the car has been quite successful in the Indian market and has been particularly lauded for its build quality.

In November 2011, Škoda, a subsidiary of Volkswagen, introduced the Rapid, a car that is basically a re-badged Vento without a 1.2 TSI engine option. The Rapid is otherwise mechanically identical to the Vento but uses some of the Škoda family’s design philosophy. The Rapid petrol automatic also lacks a DSG and uses a more traditional 6-speed torque converter instead.

Since April 2012, the car has been sold in Malaysia under the name "Polo Sedan". The car is also manufactured and sold in Russia and Thailand as "Volkswagen Polo Sedan" with only the petrol engine available.

As of late 2013, the Vento manufactured in India is being offered in the Mexican market, both with gasoline and diesel engines. Gasoline-powered cars have the choice of manual or automatic transmissions; diesel is sold as a manual only. Trim levels are called Style, Active and Highline.

Again, in late 2013, when Volkswagen returned to the Philippines, it launched the Vento as the Polo Notch in its lineup.

In 2014, the Taiwanese market Polo will switch from European models (hatchback only) to India models, both hatchback and sedan (rebadged as Polo Sedan), all with the 1.6 MPI petrol engine and 6 speed tiptronic powertrain. The price has been reduced for 2014 models, in the interest of competing with locally made economy cars.

In May 2018, Volkswagen discontinued the Polo Notch in the Philippines. It was replaced by the Volkswagen Santana.

On introduction of Bharat Stage VI emissions norms in India, the Vento 1.5TDI will be discontinued and the petrol engines will be replaced by a new locally manufactured, more fuel-efficient three-cylinder 1.0 TSI engine.

== Mexican market ==
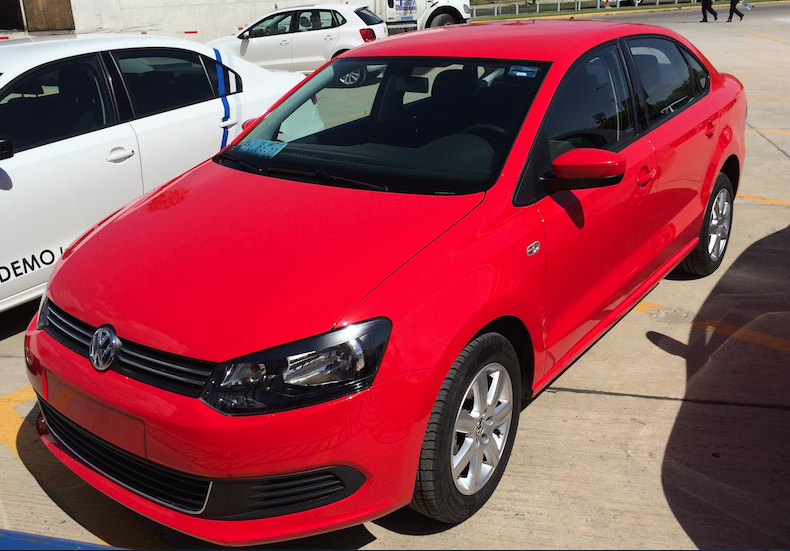
Volkswagen Vento Active (2014) in Mexico

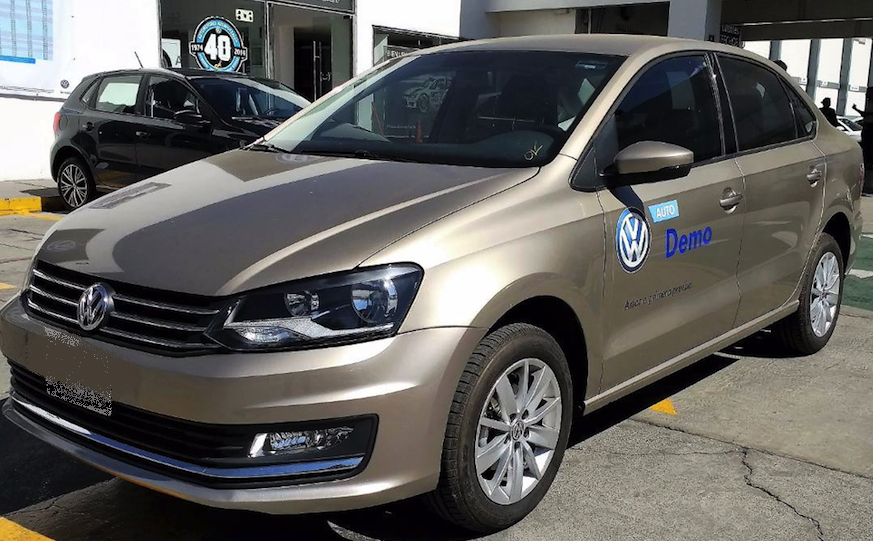
2015 model with a fresh new facelift, minor changes.

The Volkswagen Vento was introduced in the Mexican market as a 2014 model manufactured by Volkswagen India. It has developed a high rate of sales, leaving behind the Clásico (redesigned Jetta MK4) and Jetta MK6, both produced in Mexico. The main rivals in Mexican market are the Chevrolet Aveo, Nissan Versa and Kia Rio.

VW offers a choice of two engine options; a 1.6-liter naturally aspirated gasoline engine with a five-speed manual or a six-speed automatic DSG gearbox and a 1.6-liter diesel engine mated only to a five-speed manual gearbox (TDI).

== Safety ==
The Indian-made Polo Sedan in its most basic Latin American market configuration with 2 airbags received 5 stars for adult occupants and 3 stars for toddlers from Latin NCAP 1.0 in 2015.

Latin NCAP 1.5 test results Volkswagen Vento / Polo Sedán + 2 Airbags (2015, similar to Euro NCAP 2002)
Test	Points	Stars
Adult occupant:	14.73/17.0	5 /5 stars
Child occupant:	34.16/49.00	3 /5 stars

== Engine ==
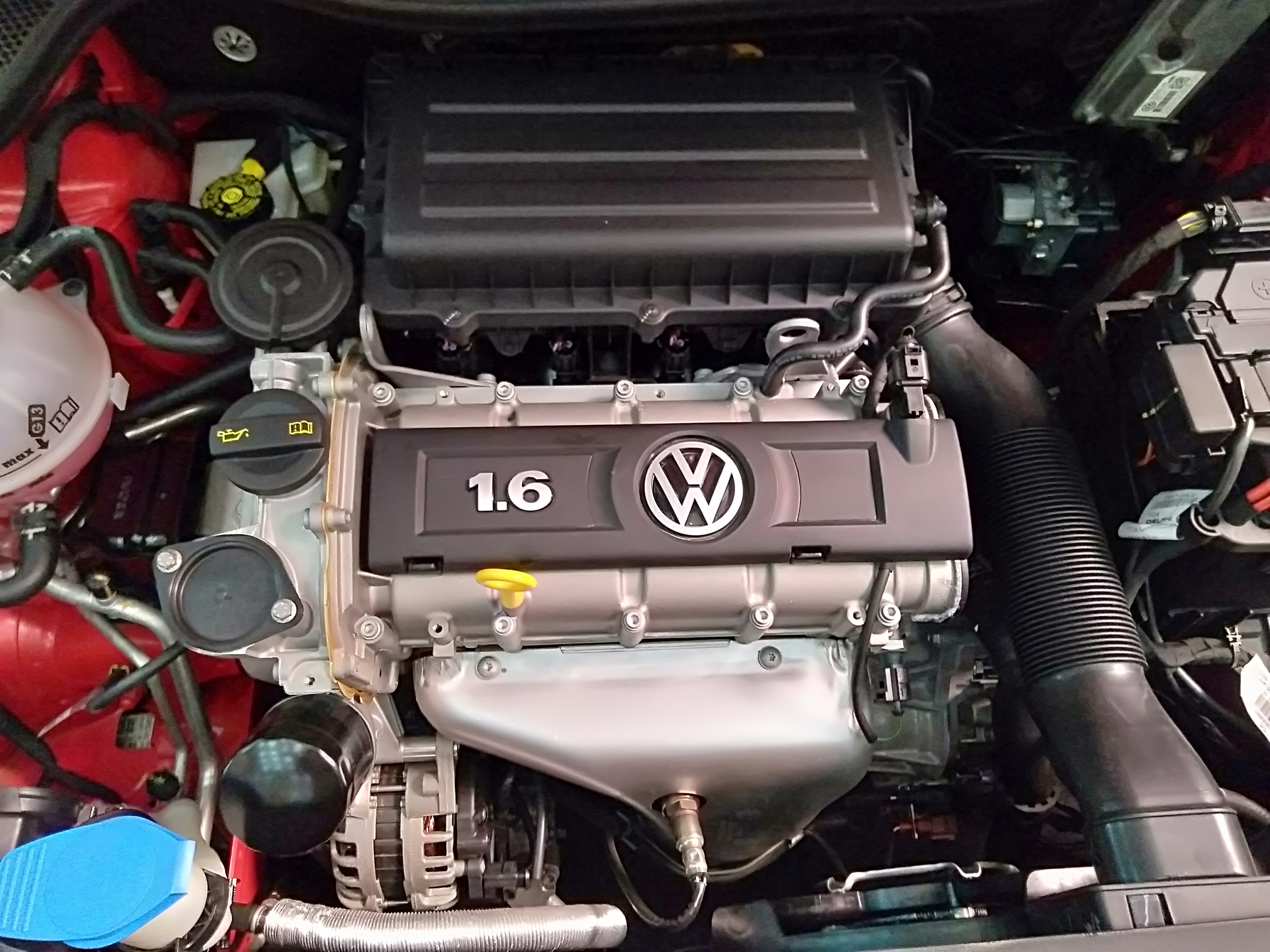
1.6L MPi petrol engine

Model	Displacement	Valvetrain configuration	Valves	Max. power at rpm	Max. torque at rpm	Top speed	Acceleration 0-100 km/h (0-62 mph)
Petrol engine
1.2 TSI	1,197 cc	inline-4 SOHC	8	77 kW (105 PS; 103 hp) / 5000	175 N⋅m (129 lb⋅ft) / 1550	170 km/h (106 mph)	11.7 s
1.6 MPI	1,598 cc	inline-4 DOHC	16	77 kW (105 PS; 103 hp) / 5250	153 N⋅m (113 lb⋅ft) / 3800	165 km/h (103 mph)	12.2 s
1.0 TSI	999 cc	inline-3 Turbocharged	8	81 kW (110 PS; 109 hp) / 5000	175 N⋅m (129 lb⋅ft) / 1550	190 km/h (118 mph)	10.4 s
Diesel engine
1.5 TDI	1,498 cc	inline-4 DOHC	16	81 kW (110 PS; 109 hp) / 4000	250 N⋅m (184 lb⋅ft) / 1500–3000	166 km/h (103 mph)	11.3 s
1.6 TDI	1,598 cc	inline-4 DOHC	16	86 kW (116 PS; 115 hp) /4000	250 N.m (184 lb.ft) /1500-3000	198 km/h (123 mph)	10.2 s

== 2019 facelift ==
Along with the Polo, the facelifted version of the Polo/Vento Mk5 was released on 3 September 2019 in India, whilst older versions of them will be kept on sale for a few years. It is very similar to its GTI version in terms of design and it will be expanded for most markets where the Polo saloon and hatchback versions are sold. The only engine option available is a 1.0-liter TSI motor that puts out 110 hp (82 kW) and 175 N⋅m (129 lb⋅ft) of torque. Available gearboxes will be 6-speed manual transmission and 6-speed tiptronic. In the Mexican market, the facelifted Polo arrived during 2020.
