= Democracy & Freedom Watch =

Georgian online newspaper

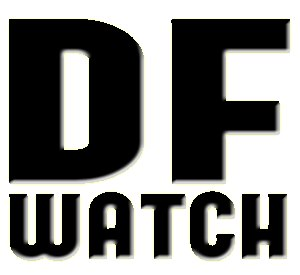
- Type: Online newspaper
- Publisher: Journalists for the Future
- Editor-in-chief: Lasha Tughushi
- Founded: September 2011; 15 years ago
- Language: English, Georgian and Russian
- Headquarters: Tbilisi, Georgia
- Country: Georgia (country)
- Website: dfwatch.net

Democracy & Freedom Watch is an online newspaper based in Tbilisi and published by the Georgian NGO Journalists for the Future (Georgian: ჟურნალისტები მომავალისთვის). It carries news stories, political commentary and reports on the democratic development in Georgia and its neighboring territories.

== Overview ==
The trilingual website publishes in English, Georgian and Russian.

Apart from news stories about Georgia, the site also covers Russia's North Caucasus republics, as well as the disputed territories of Abkhazia and South Ossetia.

== Funding ==
Democracy & Freedom Watch has received funding from the Open Society Foundation, indirectly from the National Endowment for Democracy in 2015 via Journalists for the Future, and from the Friedrich Ebert Foundation. DFWatch receives some revenue from online advertising. In 2025, DFWatch stated that it "do[esn't] take donor money" and that its funds come "entirely" from readers.
