= Škoda Garde/Rapid =

Škoda Rapid
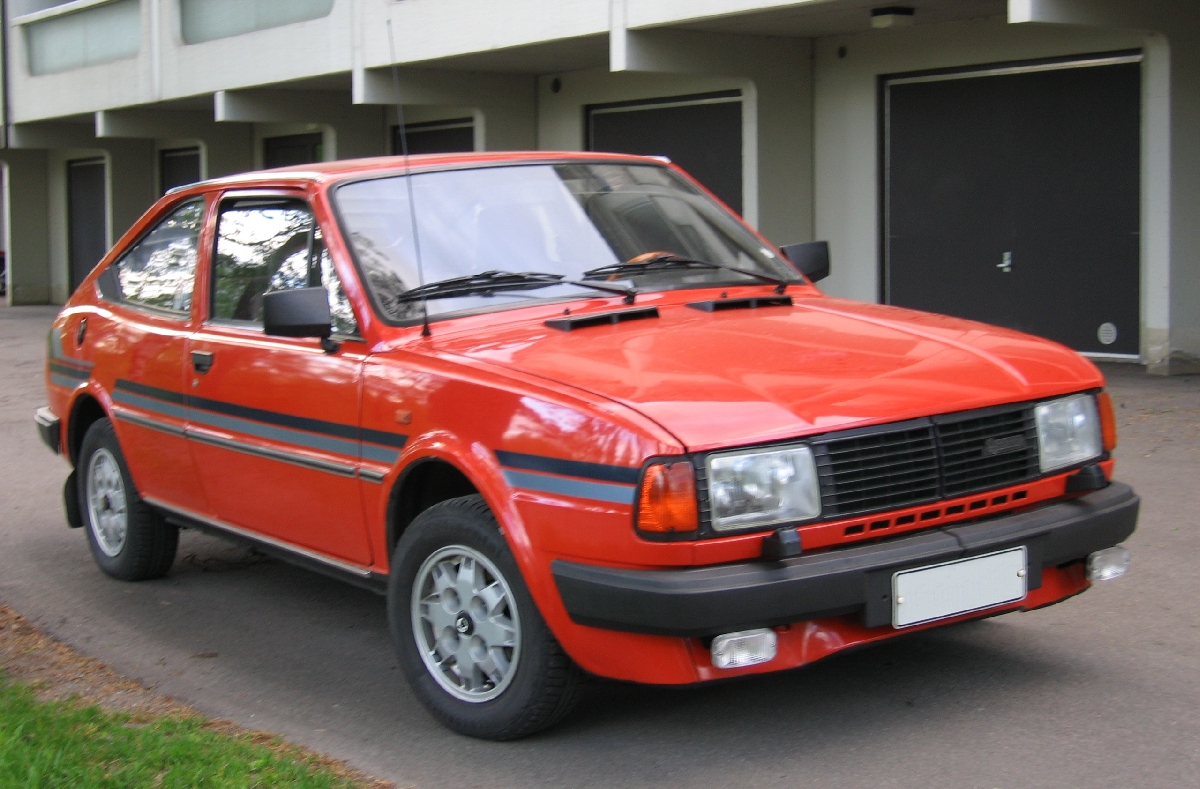

Overview
- Manufacturer: AZNP
- Also called: Škoda Garde
- Production: 1981–1990
- Assembly: Czechoslovakia: Kvasiny; Bratislava

Body and chassis
- Body style: 2-door coupé
- Layout: Rear-engine, rear-wheel-drive
- Related: Škoda Type 742

Powertrain
- Engine: 1174 cc I4; 1289 cc I4
- Transmission: 4-speed manual (Garde/Rapid 120); 5-speed manual (Rapid 130/135/136)

Dimensions
- Wheelbase: 2,400 mm (94 in)
- Length: 4,200 mm (165.4 in) (initial); 4,200 mm (165.4 in) (facelift)
- Width: 1,610 mm (63 in)
- Height: 1,380 mm (54 in)
- Kerb weight: 855–915 kg (1,885–2,017 lb)

Chronology
- Predecessor: Škoda 110R

The Škoda Rapid/Garde is a fastback coupé designed and built by AZNP in Czechoslovakia between 1981 and 1990. Based on the rear-engined Škoda 105, 120, and 130 saloons, it was a replacement for the Škoda 110R Coupé built between 1970 and 1980. For the first few years, it was sold as the Škoda Garde in the Czech home markets and some export markets as well. The Rapid/Garde are internally known as Type 743 models, with the later 135/136 Rapids being referred to as Type 747. The Rapid name was originally used on 1930s Škoda models, and was revived again in 2011 on the Indian market Rapid saloon, based on the Volkswagen Vento, and in 2012 on a Rapid hatchback for the international market.

The Škoda Rapid was famous being described as "the poor man’s Porsche" after Autocar and Motor defined the Škoda Rapid "a beginners' course to the 911", as it had a rear-mounted engine and rear-wheel drive, just like the Porsche 911.

According to the website "How Many Left?", there were a total of 50 Škoda Rapids left on British roads in 2011.

== Garde/Rapid (1981) ==
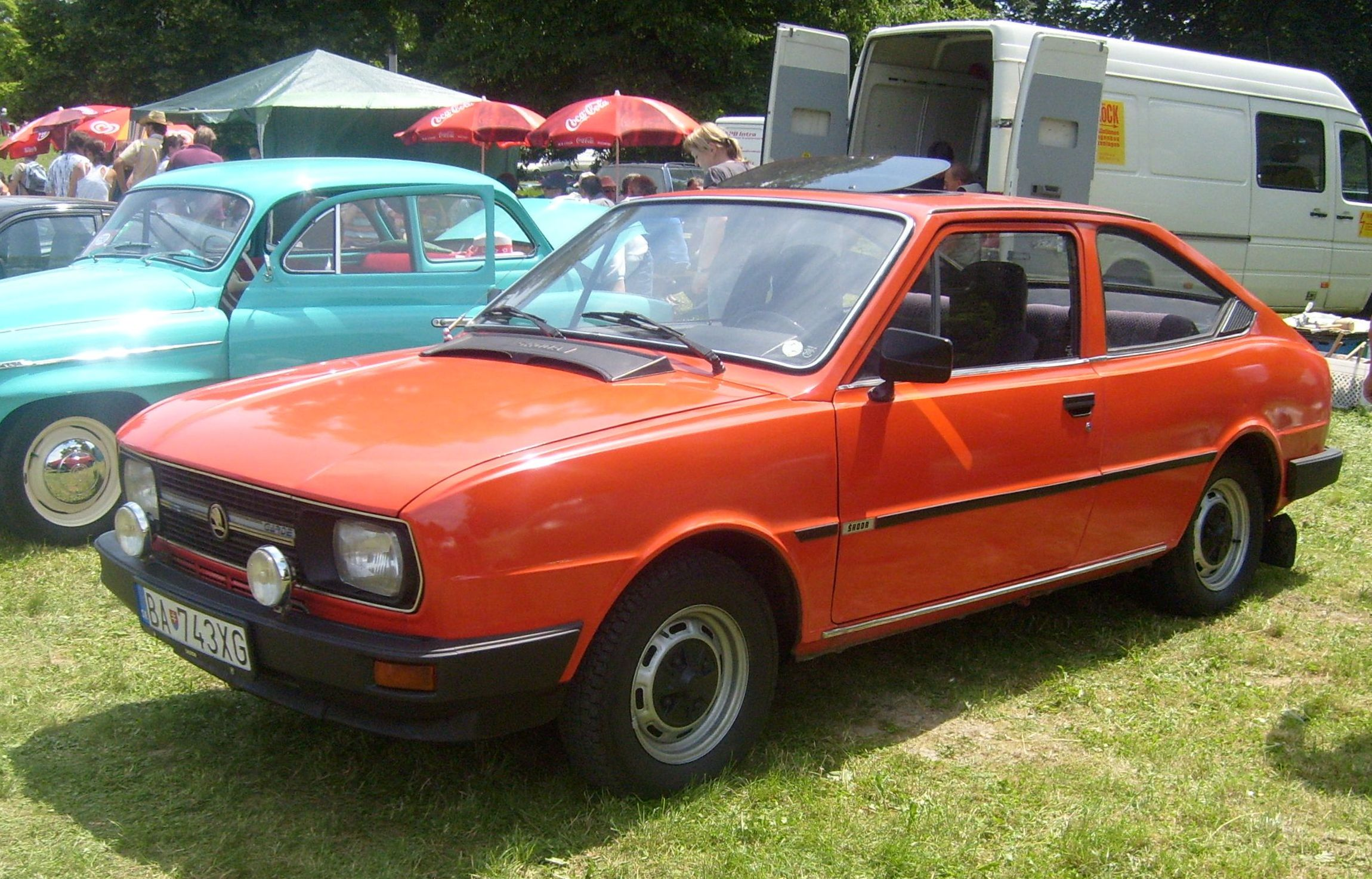
Škoda Garde, based on the 120 saloon

When first introduced, the coupé version was sold as the Škoda Garde in many markets, including the Czechoslovak domestic market. The Rapid name was also used in export from the very beginning, in the UK and in Germany, for example. It is a 2-door coupé derived from the Škoda 120 LS 4-door saloon, powered by the same 1.2-litre (1174 cc) engine producing 55 PS (40 kW; 54 hp). The rear suspension was also redesigned, using a semi-trailing arm layout rather than the swing axle of the saloons.

It was initially manufactured in Kvasiny from September 1981 to May 1982 - with production moving to Bratislava in May 1982 – becoming the first mass-produced car in Slovakia. It was replaced by the facelifted "M-series" version in July 1984.

== Facelift model (1984) ==
Based on the revised Type 742M saloons, the facelifted model received larger headlamps and blocky, black plastic bumpers. The "Garde" name which had been used in certain markets earlier was now dropped.

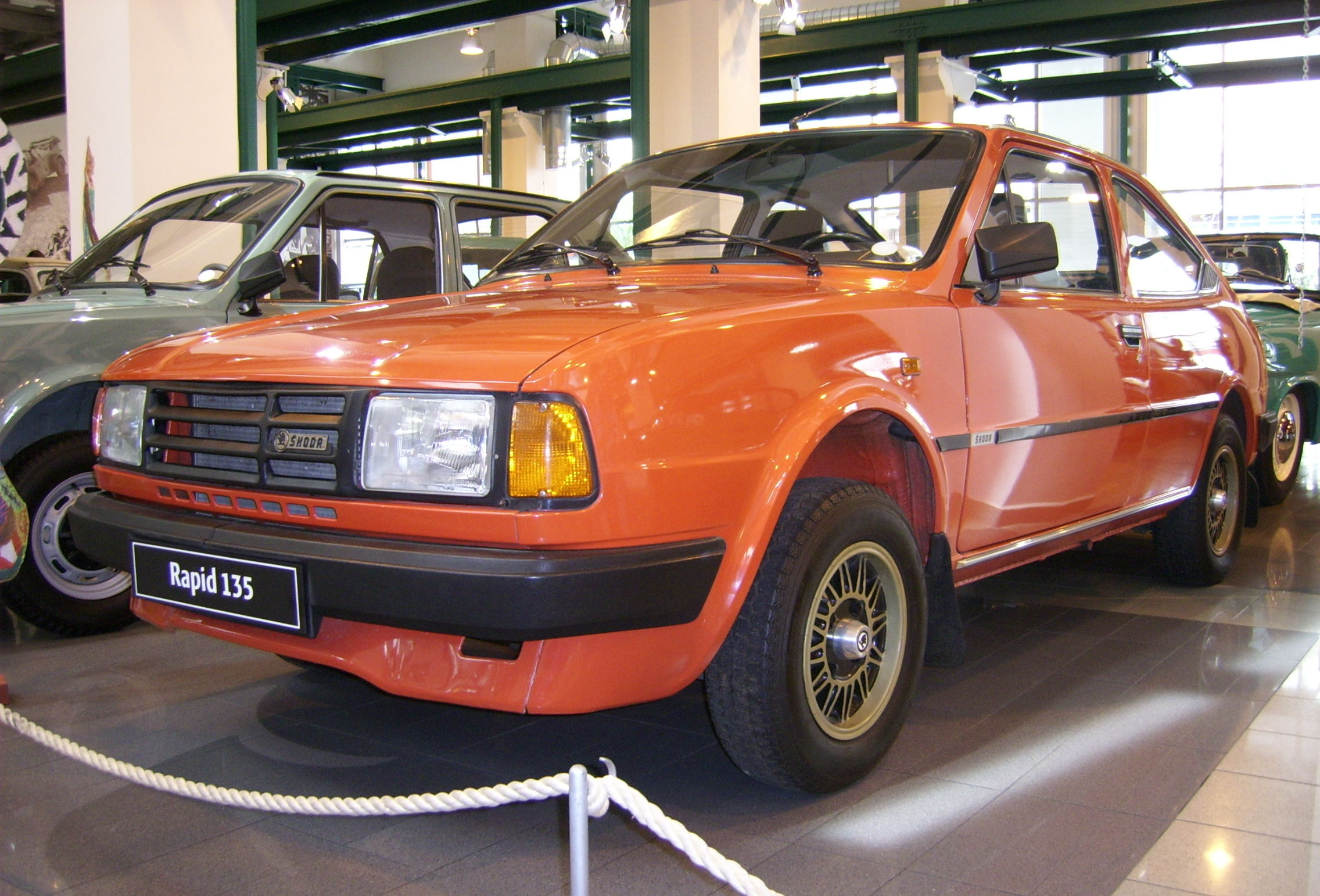
Rapid 135

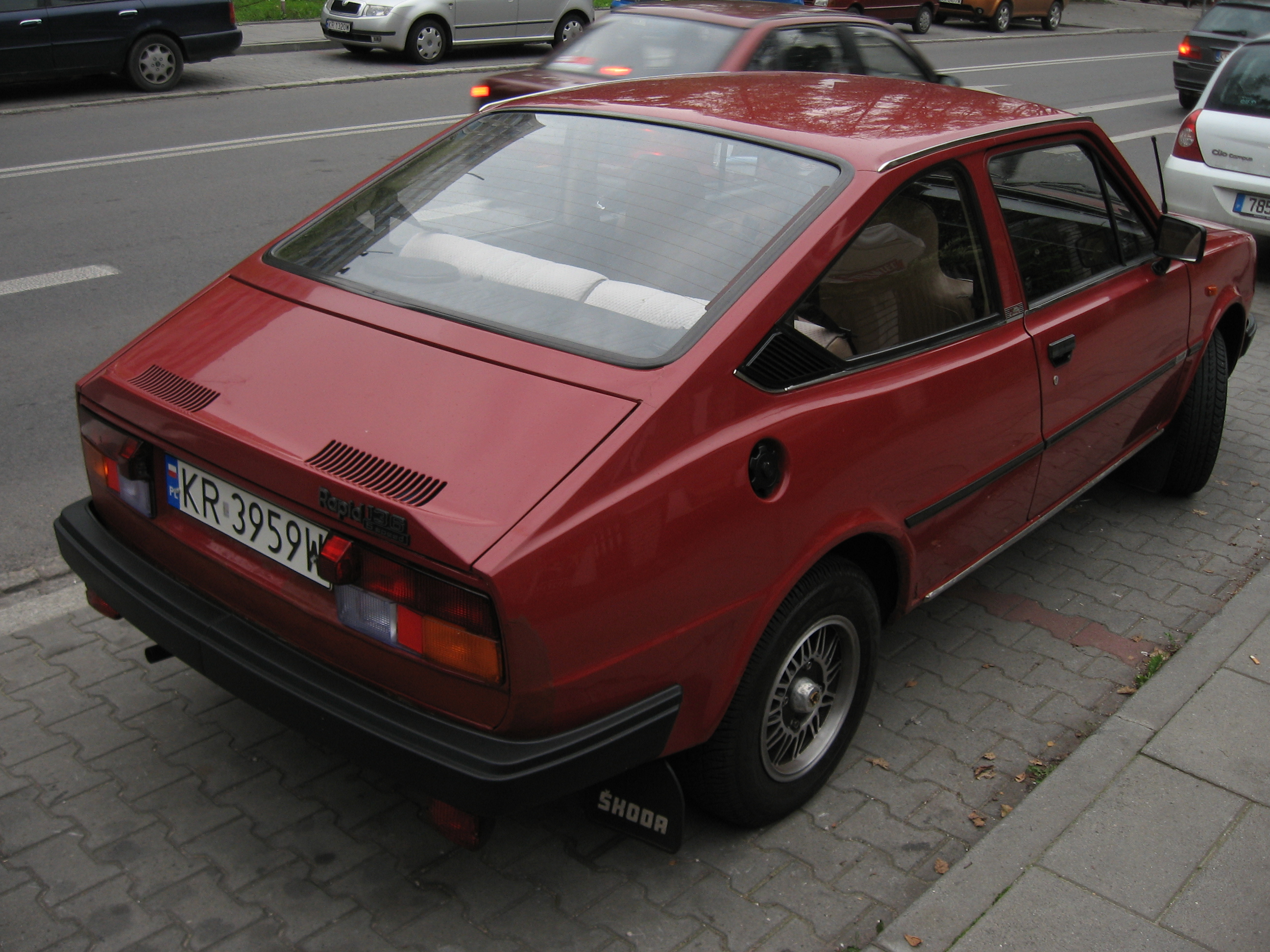
Rear view

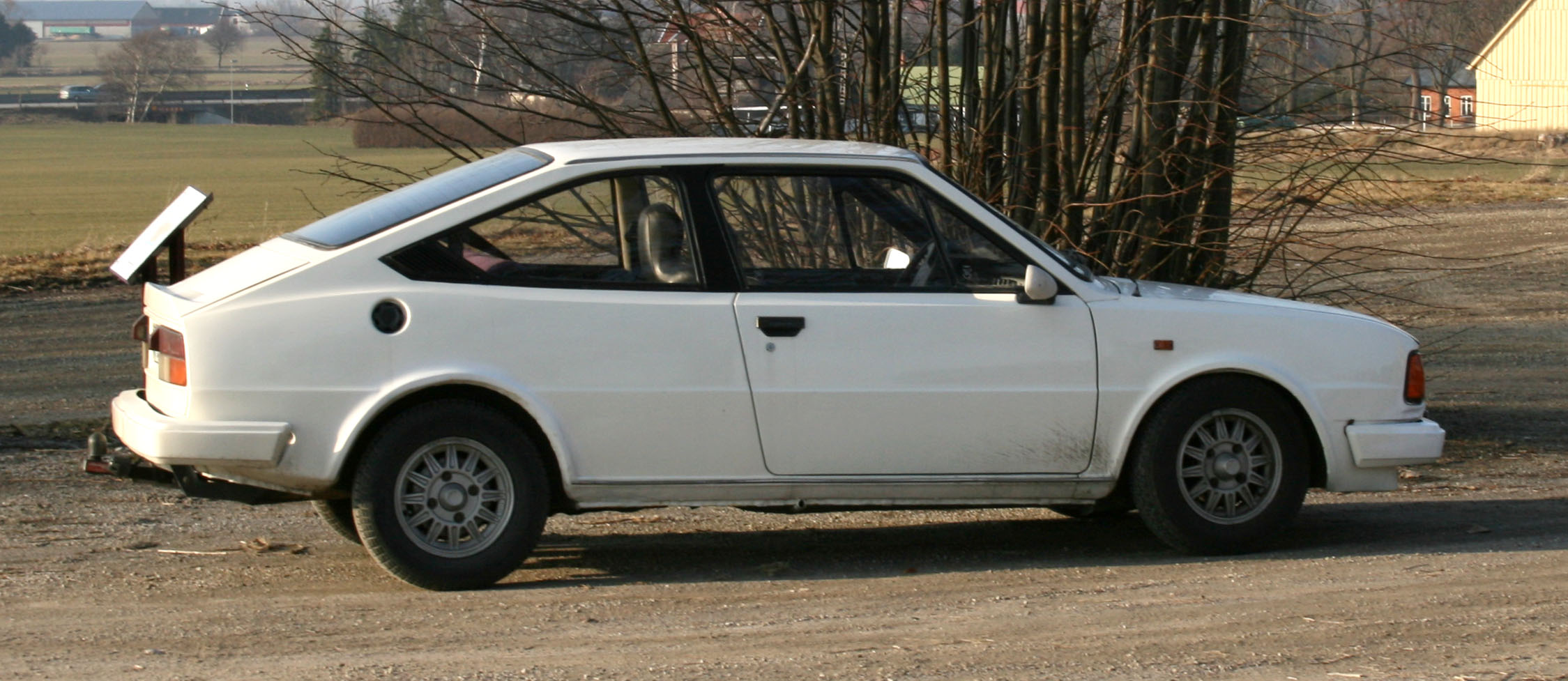
1985 Škoda Rapid

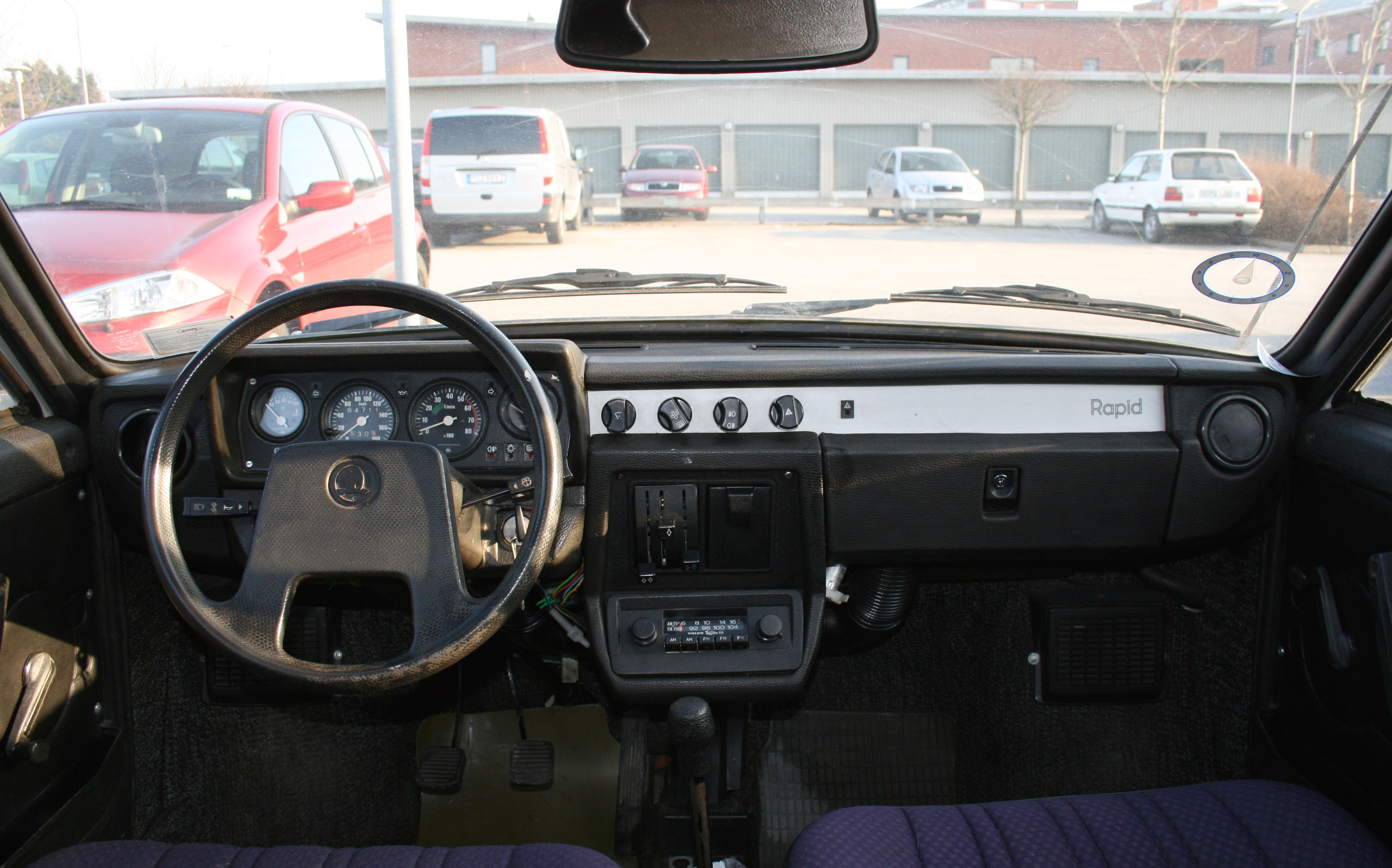
1985 Škoda Rapid interior

== Specifications ==
The Rapid used a unibody structure and a rear-engine, rear-wheel-drive layout. Front suspension was by double wishbones and coil springs. At the rear there were semi-trailing arms and coil springs, a major upgrade from the swing axle of earlier Škodas that gave safer and more predictable handling. Brakes were discs with four-pot calipers at the front, and drums at the rear.

The engine was a water-cooled, carbureted, OHV inline four mounted longitudinally, slanted to the right and overhanging the rear axle. Power was sent to the rear wheels through a transaxle gearbox. Engine upgrades were introduced concurrently with the analogous ones of the Type 742/746 saloons.

In the first years of production, the Rapid 120 used the same 1174 cc, 55 PS (40 kW; 54 hp) aluminium block, cast iron heads engine and four-speed gearbox as on the initial model. These first series were made by BAZ in Bratislava; production was gradually moved back to Škoda's small Kvasiny plant. BAZ ended production in 1987, after building 3,280 of the Garde and Rapid combined.

A stronger 1289 cc engine fitted with a five-speed manual gearbox was mounted on the Škoda Rapid 130, producing 58 PS (43 kW; 57 hp) at 5000 rpm and 72 lb⋅ft (98 N⋅m) at 2850 rpm. Top speed was 95 mph (152.9 km/h) and the car could accelerate from standstill to 60 mph (97 km/h) in 16.5 seconds. The 1987 Rapid 136 (Type 747) introduced an upgraded 1.3, with new aluminium alloy 8-port cylinder heads. Power and torque increased to 62 PS (46 kW; 61 hp) at 5000 rpm and 100 N⋅m (74 lb⋅ft) at 3000 rpm. While top speed remained the same, acceleration to 60 mph (97 km/h) was reduced to 14.9 seconds. In August 1987 the Rapid 135 arrived, the Rapid 130 was kept in production for a while but was discontinued in July 1988. The 135 used the all-aluminium engine of the 136, albeit with a lower compression ratio which lowered output to 58 PS (43 kW; 57 hp). The Rapid 135 Ri and RiC received fuel injected versions (by Bendix) of the newer engine and were briefly available in some markets, including Britain and Austria. "Ri" stands for "Rapid Injection", while the "RiC" added a catalytic converter.

=== Rapid Cabriolet ===
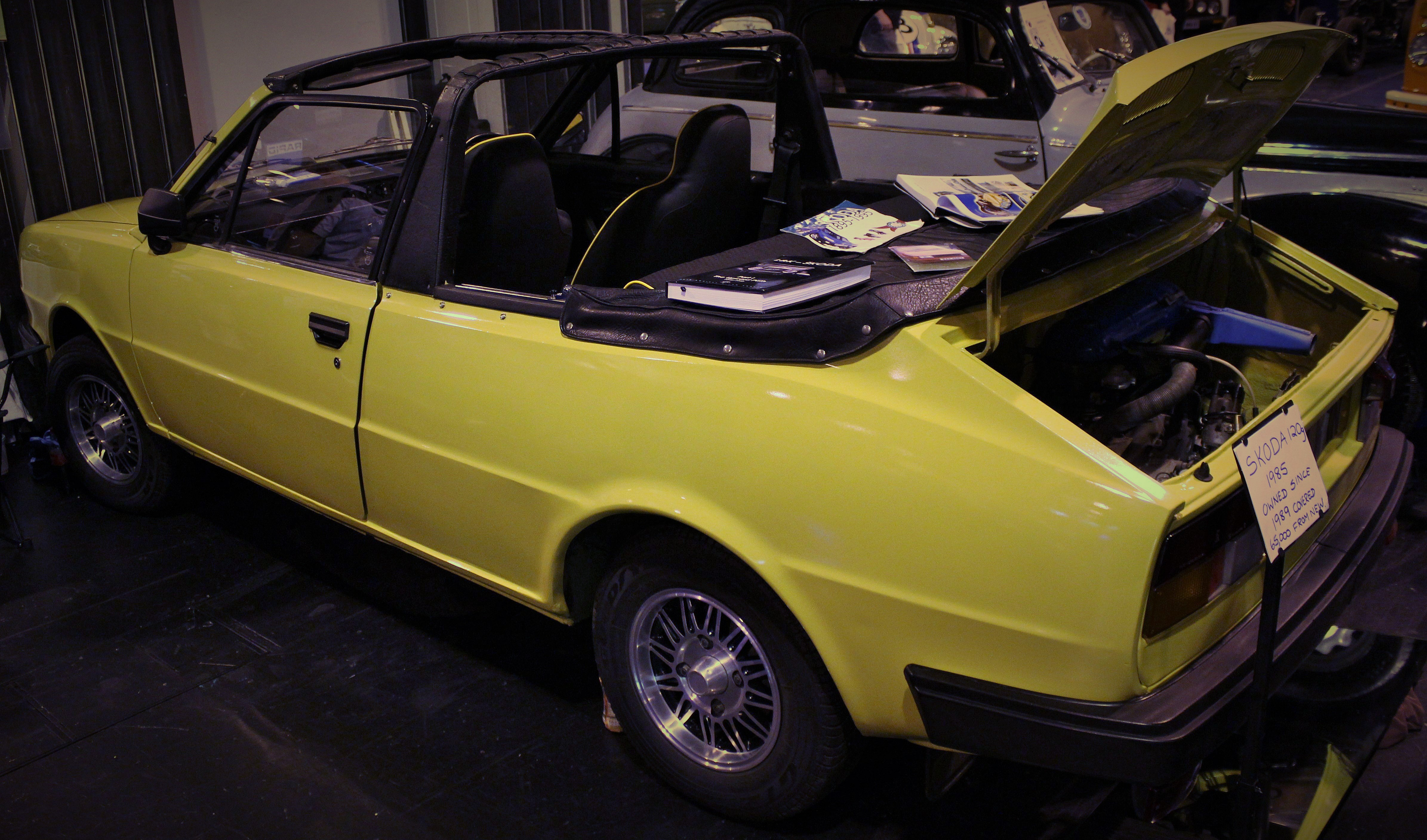
A 1985 Rapid Cabriolet

A convertible version of the Rapid was offered by Škoda GB on the British market. Standard Rapid coupés were imported and converted in the UK by specialist Ludgate Design & Development (LDD ltd.) in Kent, and were sold through the official Škoda dealerships. The cars retained their window frames, and were reinforced with additional chassis bracing and a T-shaped rollbar similar to the Triumph Stag's. At a total price of just under £5,000, the Rapid Cabriolet was the cheapest convertible on sale in the United Kingdom. 334 Rapids were thus converted.

Models

Model	Type	Produced	Engine	Bore × Stroke	Power	Transmission	Number built
Škoda Garde/Rapid 120	743.12X	1981.09–1984.07	1174 cc I4	72 × 72 mm	55 PS (40 kW)	4-speed manual	11,179
Škoda Rapid 120	743.12X	1984.08–1986.07	1174 cc I4	72 × 72 mm	55 PS (40 kW)	5-speed manual	11,179
Škoda 130 Rapid	743.13	1984.08–1988.07	1289 cc I4	75.5 × 72 mm	58 PS (43 kW) or: 61 PS (45 kW)	5-speed manual	22,475
Škoda 135 Rapid	747.135	1987.08–1990.08	1289 cc I4	75.5 × 72 mm	58 PS (43 kW) or: 56 PS (41 kW) (with Bendix fuel injection)	5-speed manual	1,272
Škoda 136 Rapid	747.136	1987.08–1990.08	1289 cc I4	75.5 × 72 mm	62 PS (46 kW)	5-speed manual	9,708
Total production (coupés):							44,634
