= Corruption in Georgia =

Corruption in Georgia had been an issue in the post-Soviet decades. Before the 2003 Rose Revolution, according to Foreign Policy, Georgia was among the most corrupt nations in Eurasia. The level of corruption abated dramatically, however, after the revolution. In 2010, Transparency International (TI) said that Georgia was "the best corruption-buster in the world." While low-level corruption had earlier been largely eliminated, Transparency International Georgia since 2020 has also documented dozens of cases of high-level corruption that remain to be prosecuted.

In January 2012, the World Bank called Georgia a "unique success" of the world in fighting corruption. Philippe Le Houérou said that "Georgia's experience shows that the vicious cycle of endemic corruption can be broken and, with appropriate and decisive reforms, can be turned into a virtuous cycle." Georgia is "the only post-Soviet state in the past decade to have made a breakthrough" in addressing corruption, according to Foreign Policy.

Council of Europe's Group of States Against Corruption in its fourth evaluation round noted that Georgia has largely succeeded in eradicating petty corruption, however, it is also argued that corruption has changed shape in Georgia in recent years. For example, a 'clientelistic system' has emerged where the country's leadership 'allocates resources in order to generate the loyalty and support it needs to stay in power.

== Background ==
As recently as 2003, according to the World Bank, corruption was an everyday part of Georgian life, with citizens reporting bribery as a regular occurrence. That changed with the 2003 Rose Revolution, which ousted President Shevardnadze, and which is widely considered a reaction to the corruption and poor governance under Shevardnadze. After Mikheil Saakashvili won 96% of the vote in the 2004 elections, he instituted drastic anti-corruption reforms. This included firing the entire Ministry of Education staff. Georgia adopted the anti-corruption mechanisms of nations with successful anti-corruption efforts, such as Italy's anti-mafia efforts, and German police training. As part of the post-revolutionary effort to crack down on corruption, films showing the arrests of senior government officials on corruption charges were broadcast to the public in order to make clear the seriousness of the effort.

In 2004, Georgia's corruption perception score improved more dramatically than that of any other country, as measured by TI's Global Corruption Barometer. In that year, 60% of respondents expected corruption levels to decrease during the next three years. In 2005, however, that figure dropped to 38%. The government's "zero-tolerance" policy has dramatically changed the situation, leaving the country tied with most advanced European nations in all governance indicators. The country has routinely seen impressive results in varying governance indicators.

The Saakashvili government's efforts all but eliminated petty corruption in the public sector, particularly in the police department, tax collection administration, customs bureau, public services, and education sectors. However, some critics dispute the claim that corruption was eliminated, maintaining instead that there was a shift from "rampant petty bribery to more clientelistic forms of corruption." Indeed, according to some sources, many forms of corruption have remained common in Georgia. For example, executive power, combined with a weak judiciary and media, makes abuse of power at every level of government a possibility and allows top officials to operate with near impunity.

Moreover, while Transparency International Georgia's 2011 National Integrity System Assessment credited the post-2004 reforms with making the executive branch and law enforcement stronger and more efficient, as well as with strengthening the fight against petty bribery and certain other types of corruption, TI Georgia noted that some executive agencies were insufficiently accountable and transparent, that news media had not devoted enough resources to investigating corruption, and that the country's 2010 anti-corruption policy lacked a coherent framework based on a thorough analysis of the challenges. TI Georgia also charged the Anti-Corruption Council, created in 2008, with poor monitoring and evaluation of the plan's implementation.

In 2013, the World Bank described Georgia's underground economy as the world's largest relative to the scale of the country's official economic activity.

In Transparency International's 2025 Corruption Perceptions Index, which scored 182 countries on a scale from 0 ("highly corrupt") to 100 ("very clean"), Georgia scored 50. When ranked by score, Georgia ranked 56th among the 182 countries in the Index, where the country ranked first is perceived to have the most honest public sector. For comparison with regional scores, the best score among Eastern European and Central Asian countries (Note: Albania, Armenia, Azerbaijan, Belarus, Bosnia and Herzegovina, Georgia, Kazakhstan, Kosovo, Kyrgyzstan, Moldova, Montenegro, North Macedonia, Russia, Serbia, Tajikistan, Turkey, Turkmenistan, Ukraine, Uzbekistan) was 50, the average score was 34 and the worst score was 17. For comparison with worldwide scores, the best score was 89 (ranked 1), the average score was 42, and the worst score was 9 (ranked 181, in a two-way tie).

== Government ==
Thanks to strong enforcement, low-level civil-service graft has all but disappeared since Saakashvili became president. To be sure, some government funds, such as the president's funds, continue to operate with insufficient accountability. Bonuses are paid by government agencies on an arbitrary basis. A 2011 report indicated that political leaders have used public resources to maintain their party's rule of the political system. Also, strong patronage networks endure, and it is common for public officials to blend their position with private enterprise.

Transparency International has identified the government's influence on regulatory bodies as opening up opportunities for corruption. The National Communications Commission has been charged with selectively enforcing regulations, for example in awarding and denying broadcast licenses, and has not enforced the rule against government bodies with broadcast licences or government bodies that sponsor media entities.

Furthermore, the oversight of the public budget is weak, and as of 2011 the Ministry of Defense, the Ministry of Internal Affairs, and other government bodies had yet to institute internal auditing. TI Georgia has criticized the Ministry of Internal Affairs for excessive surveillance of private electronic communications and for placing its officers illegally in independent government agencies.

The legislature and judiciary, as well as the media and civil society, are weak in comparison to the executive. Transparency and accountability are weaker in local Georgian governments than in the national government. Unsalaried city council members are exempt from integrity rules that apply to national officials.

=== Public procurement ===
There is little corruption in the public procurement sector. Despite a highly transparent system procurement, certain exceptions and loopholes make no-bid state contracts possible. As of 2012, indeed, 45% of state contracts were awarded without a bidding process taking place.

Moreover, licenses in certain sectors have been awarded under less than fully competitive and transparent conditions. One such sector is mining. Another is media. For example, when the management rights for a TV broadcasting tower in Tbilisi were sold at auction, the winner of the auction, who had no background in telecommunications, was selected beforehand. Also, firms with ties to a former defense minister were granted exclusive rights to outdoor advertising in the capital and a license to run the national lottery. Also, some state-owned assets have been sold without competitive bidding, sometimes for less than market value. Similarly, in 2011, the Tbilisi City Hall awarded management rights to a public park to a firm owned by a City Council member.

=== Taxation ===
There is relatively little corruption in the taxation system. Only rarely are companies asked to pay bribes or extra payments in connection with taxes. Tax officials are, however, subject to a degree of executive interference. Supporters of opposition parties, for instance, have been known to be harassed by the tax police.

=== Customs ===
Corruption is rare in the customs service. A 2014 report noted that Georgia had reduced the number of customs facilities and simplified the procedures for clearance, so that importing and exporting involve fewer documents and less expense than elsewhere in the region.

=== Bribery ===
Before 2003, virtually any government transaction required some amount of bribe for processing. Nearly all bureaucrats and officials were said to abuse their power for personal gain. In 2013, the percentage of respondents to the Global Corruption Survey who said they had a bribe for public services was only 4%.

In 2011, two businessmen from Israel, Ron Fuchs and Ze'ev Frenkiel, were imprisoned for offering a bribe to the Prime Minister, but were pardoned later that year, supposedly for humanitarian reasons. On the same day that the pardon was made public, the Ministry of Justice announced a settlement with their firm, Tramex, that involved a $73 million reduction in an arbitration award against Georgia. The timing was viewed as suspicious, but the government insisted it was purely coincidental.

=== Elections ===
Experts say that the government exerts "undue influence" on the electorate, with state officials inappropriately using official resources to influence voters. Before the 2012 parliamentary elections, campaign contributions by corporations were made illegal, but this move was viewed not as an anti-corruption measure but as a means of maintaining the ruling party's advantage. Indeed, the new rules were used largely to intimidate the opposition. Also, some contributions during the 2012 election cycle that were nominally made by individuals were, in fact, corporate donations in disguise. In addition, there are indications that campaign donations made by persons representing companies with government contracts were essentially kickbacks. Contribution disclosure rules were later introduced to address this issue, but the State Audit Office seems insufficiently able to willing to do its part to ensure compliance with the new rules.

The Economist complained in 2012 about new limits on political contributions that sought to curb the influence of Georgia's richest man and an opponent of the government, Bidzina Ivanishvili.

=== Police ===
Police corruption is not a major problem in Georgia. Corruption among traffic police was a major problem before the Rose Revolution; after Saakashvili became president, 16,000 traffic police officers were fired quickly and unceremoniously.

=== Judiciary ===
According to one respected source, corruption is not a major problem in the judicial sector. Transparency International has stated that while bribery is, in fact, rare in the Georgian judiciary, judges are widely viewed by the Georgian people as corrupt. In 2013, for example, 51% of respondents said the judiciary was corrupt or extremely corrupt. The Prosecutor's Office no longer has the strong influence over the judiciary that it enjoyed before 2012.

=== Legislative crackdown ===
In April 2025, the Georgian parliament, dominated by the Georgian Dream party, passed an updated version of the controversial Foreign Agents law. Originally adopted in May 2024, the law imposed strict regulations on non-governmental organizations (NGOs) and media outlets, with the aim of stifling dissent. The new version, modeled after the U.S. Foreign Agents Registration Act (FARA) of 1938, requires organizations receiving over 20% of funding from foreign sources to register as "foreign agents." However, the law is broader than its U.S. counterpart and has been criticized for labeling independent civil society groups as foreign-controlled. The law, along with other amendments, including redefinitions of treason and the exclusion of gender-related terms from legislation, has drawn condemnation from international bodies such as the OSCE and the U.S. State Department, which have expressed concerns about the erosion of democratic standards in Georgia.

== Education ==
After the recession of the early 1990s, professors were earning so little that they required bribes to get by. Usually, they supplemented their income by charging "fees" for admissions exams, as a result of which applicants to Tbilisi State University could pay up to a $30,000 bribe to ensure admission and get the highest grades. This changed in 2002, when the World Bank instituted a National Assessment and Examinations Center that developed rigorous assessment examinations. Consequently, students who have taken the exams over the last decade, reported Foreign Policy in 2015, owe their success to their thorough education and not any patronage systems.

== Media ==
The media are one sector in which opportunities for corruption have risen under Saakashvili. His regime has been behind the takeover of leading media by loyal business interests, as a result of which criticism of the authorities has "gradually disappeared" from TV, along with investigative programs.

== Business ==
The Business Anti-Corruption Portal has stated that corruption constitutes a low risk for companies looking to do business in Georgia and that it is easier to start a business than in almost any other nation, due to the increased transparency and efficiency in receiving licenses and permits. Indeed, the business environment in Georgia has been greatly improved in recent years owing to the introduction of comparatively low income taxes and more liberal regulation. There are, however, several issues that companies have to deal with, such as the lack of judicial independence, the lack of enforcement of intellectual property rights, and selective enforcement of economic law.

There continues to be an overlap between government and business interests. Many persons with close government ties have become very rich, many public officials have acquired sizable fortunes shortly after leaving government service, and some wealthy businessmen who have been elected to parliament have been able to use their position to benefit their firms. In addition, according to a 2013 report, the owners of some companies have been forced, on occasion, to make gifts to the government, or even relinquish ownership of the business. Also, the extensive process of privatizing state assets has been lacking in transparency, and has in many cases been conducted under "suspicious circumstances."

It is believed that some firms have been awarded government contracts in return for campaign donations to the incumbent party, and have been discouraged for contributing to the opposition. As a result of such practices, the ruling party's campaign coffers have been 10 to 20 times larger than those of all other parties combined.

In 2013, Transparency International identified three "problematic" issues connection with doing business in Georgia: "the significant shadow economy, preferential treatment in contract awarding, and the lack of transparency in the wave of privatisation." In 2008, 52% of companies told the World Bank that they had been obliged to compete with unregistered companies for government contracts. As of 2013, bribery was still a factor in the awarding of government contracts.

=== Timber industry ===
Because of corruption, the rate of deforestation is very high.

== Anti-corruption efforts ==
Economic reform and anti-corruption were placed at the top political agenda of the Georgian government led by former President Saakashvili. Since 2004, Georgia had made tremendous progress in the clampdown on corruption and reinstatement of good governance. The total dissolution of the corrupt traffic police in 2004 and the establishment of the Anti-Corruption Interagency Council in 2008 were successful examples of the reform. Low-level corruption has been virtually eliminated in recent years. Both the OECD and the World Bank praised Georgia's unique success in combating corruption. But later (2017–2019) the reports from OECD showed that Georgia has stalled its efforts in reducing corruption and implementing recommendations. Transparency International noted in 2019 that "the Government of Georgia has not fulfilled a number of important anti-corruption recommendations which concern such issues as anti-corruption policy planning, enforcement of anti-corruption laws, independence of civil servants, judicial reform and reform of the law enforcement agencies, freedom of information and prevention of corruption in the public procurement process."

The World Bank, for example, attributed Georgia's success at fighting corruption to the following factors: "exercising strong political will; establishing credibility early; launching a frontal assault; attracting new staff; limiting the state's role; adopting unconventional methods; coordinating closely; tailoring international experience to local conditions; harnessing technology; using communications strategically." The lesson of Georgia's success at fighting corruption, according to The Economist, is that "[l]eadership and political will are all important," as is "establishing early credibility." Ending corruption in Georgia was part of an almost-libertarian effort to minimize the size of the state, creating fewer opportunities for graft. The young and largely western-educated new staff of the government receives a high enough salary to dissuade the temptation of corruption.

The Interagency Council for Combating Corruption, formed in 2008, consists of members of various government agencies, civil-society groups, and business associations, and is responsible for coordinating, strategizing, and monitoring the fight against corruption. The Ministry of Justice's effectiveness is considered questionable because of limited resources. The Internal Affairs Ministry's Anti-Corruption Department, formed in 2012, is responsible for fighting corruption.

The State Audit Office (SAO) is responsible for reviewing public spending, but it lacks resources to audit in sufficient depth and has been too closely tied to the political establishment. In 2012, the SAO did not enforce campaign-finance rules objectively. In fact, the SAO's head and deputy head resigned from the SAO to run as ruling-party candidates for parliament in that year. On the other hand, the current SAO head has no links to the new ruling government.

The State Procurement and Competition Agency, which coordinates and monitors public contracts, has also been praised for its transparent approach to public procurement. Since 2013, Georgia has published online all public contracts, with a few exempted for national security reasons or because of specific exceptions, such as that applied to Georgian Railways. Critics of proposed procurement contracts can file appeals online.

The improvement of law enforcement since 2004 has had a significant impact on anti-corruption efforts. According to the 2011 National Integrity System Assessment, law-enforcement agencies are among Georgia's strongest institutions, although the assessment also criticized these agencies' low transparency and accountability levels.

Georgia's strong civil-society organizations, while underfunded and dependent almost totally on foreign aid, have played a role in encouraging anti-corruption reforms, such as promoting improvements in campaign-finance law, and in monitoring fulfillment of the country's international anti-corruption commitments. TI Georgia has praised the Civil Service Bureau (CSB) for improving the system of asset disclosure.

== See also ==
- International Anti-Corruption Academy
- Group of States Against Corruption
- International Anti-Corruption Day
- ISO 37001 Anti-bribery management systems
- United Nations Convention against Corruption
- OECD Anti-Bribery Convention
- Transparency International
- Environmental issues in Georgia (country)
