= Vladimir Gigauri =

Soviet scientist

A photograph of Vladimir Gigauri

Vladimir Spiridonovich Gigauri (Georgian: ვლადიმერ გიგაური; April 10, 1934, Tbilisi – February 4, 2006, Moscow) was a renowned Georgian-born Soviet scientist in the fields of medicine, biomedical engineering, military, and space.

Professor V. Gigauri is best known for his needle-free jet injector, breathing apparatus used in space and conducting the first artificial heart implant in the Soviet Union (on a calf).

He was the head of the Soviet Experimental Surgery Department (part of USSR Academy of Medical Sciences) and member of the Russian Academy of Cosmonautics. He is a laureate of two State Prizes in the areas of science and technology, author of numerous publications and over 200 patented inventions.
