= Škoda Auto =

Czech automobile manufacturer

Škoda Auto a.s.
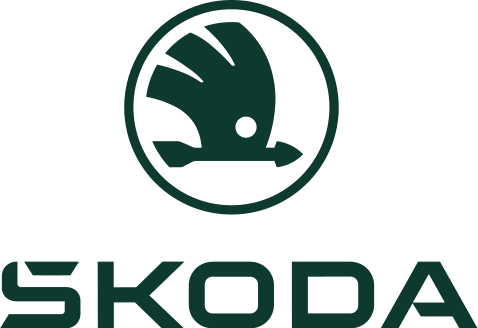
- Logo since 2022

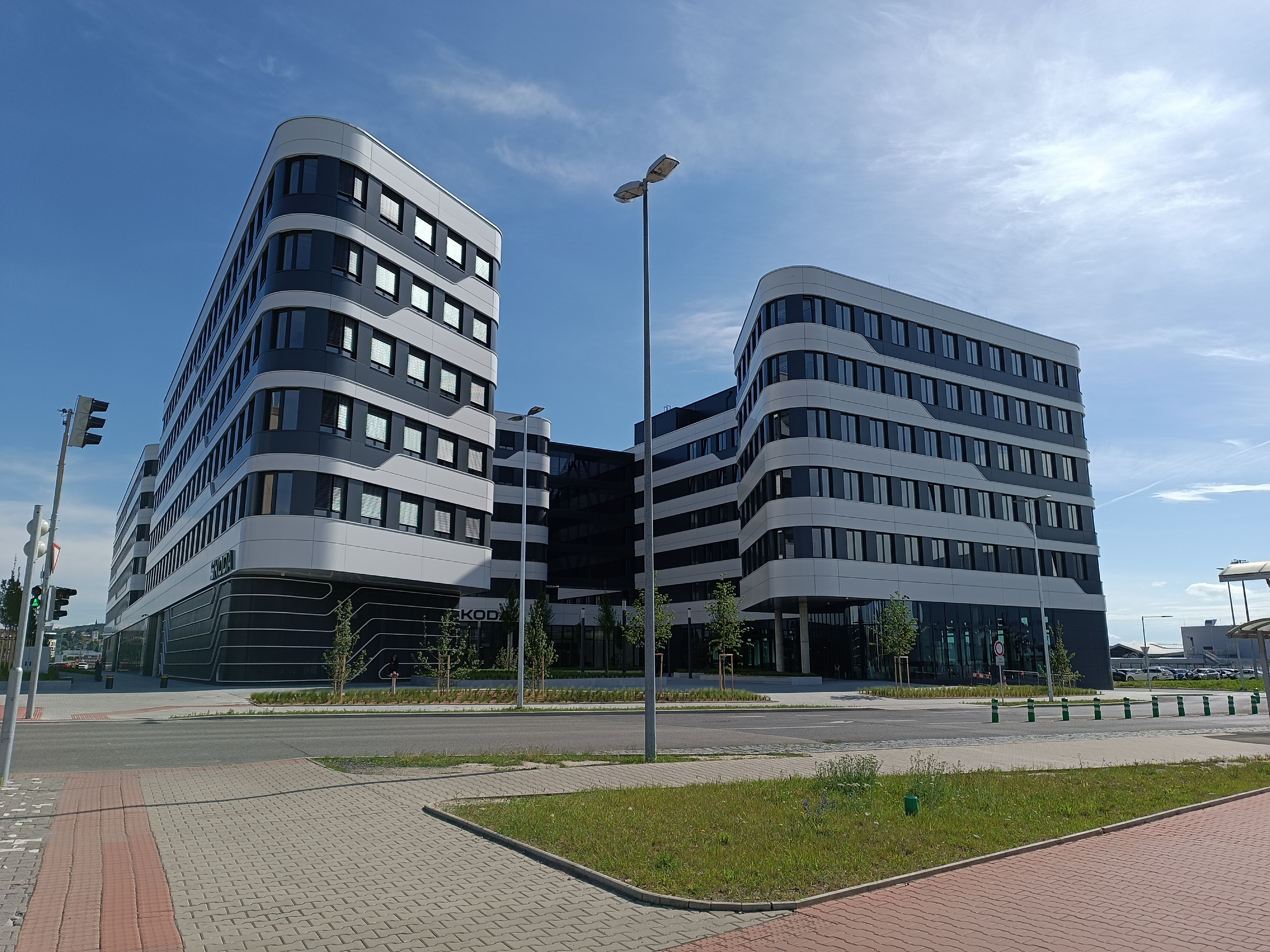
- Headquarters in Mladá Boleslav, Czech Republic, 2024
- Type: Subsidiary
- Industry: Automotive
- Predecessor: Laurin & Klement
- Founded: 1896; 130 years ago
- Founder: Václav Laurin and Václav Klement
- Headquarters: Mladá Boleslav, Czech Republic
- Area served: Worldwide (except South Korea, Japan, North America and China)
- Key people: Klaus Zellmer (CEO)
- Products: Automobiles
- Production output: 1,065,058 vehicles (2025)
- Revenue: ▲€27.8 billion (2025)
- Operating income: ▲€2.26 billion (2025)
- Net income: ▲€1.85 billion (2025)
- Total assets: ▲€12.82 billion (2025)
- Total equity: ▲€5.15 billion (2025)
- Number of employees: 34,006 (2025)
- Parent: Volkswagen Group
- Subsidiaries: Škoda Auto Česká republika Škoda Auto Deutschland GmbH; Škoda Auto Slovensko s.r.o. Škoda Auto Volkswagen India
- Website: skoda-auto.com

Škoda Auto a.s. (Czech pronunciation: [ˈʃkoda]), often shortened to Škoda, is a Czech automobile manufacturer established in 1896 as the successor to Laurin & Klement and headquartered in Mladá Boleslav, Czech Republic. Škoda Works became state owned in 1948. After the Velvet Revolution, it was gradually privatized starting in 1991, eventually becoming a wholly owned subsidiary of the German multinational conglomerate Volkswagen Group in 2000.

Škoda automobiles are sold in over 100 countries, and in 2018, total global sales reached 1.25 million units, an increase of 4.4% from the previous year. The operating profit was €1.6 billion in 2017, an increase of 34.6% over the previous year. As of 2017, Škoda's profit margin was the second-highest of all Volkswagen AG brands after Porsche. In 2025, Škoda was the third best-selling brand in Europe.

== History ==
The Škoda Works was founded by Czech engineer Emil von Škoda in 1859 in Plzeň, then in the Kingdom of Bohemia in the Austrian Empire, and was originally machinery and arms manufacturer. It was one of the largest European industrial conglomerates in the 20th century, and is the predecessor of today's Škoda Auto, Doosan Škoda Power, and Škoda Transportation companies.

=== Laurin & Klement ===
The company that became Škoda Auto began as a bicycle workshop in Mladá Boleslav, then part of Austria-Hungary. Václav Klement and mechanic Václav Laurin, who had worked in bicycle manufacturing in Turnov, opened the workshop in 1895. They initially repaired bicycles and began producing their own under the Slavia name in 1896.

In 1898, the business moved into a newly built factory. That autumn, Klement brought a Werner motorised bicycle back from Paris. Laurin & Klement used it as a starting point for their own motorcycle, placing the engine within the frame and the controls on the handlebars. The partners also corresponded with Robert Bosch about magneto ignition before developing their own ignition system. The first Slavia motorcycles were presented in Prague in November 1899. Orders followed from Germany and Britain, including an agreement to supply 150 motorcycles to Britain.

In 1905, Laurin & Klement introduced its first automobile, the Voiturette A, making it the second-oldest car manufacturer in the Czech lands after Tatra. By that time company had a workforce of 320 and used 170 special machine tools. Their first car was a success, and the company became established both within Austria-Hungary and internationally.

=== Škoda ===
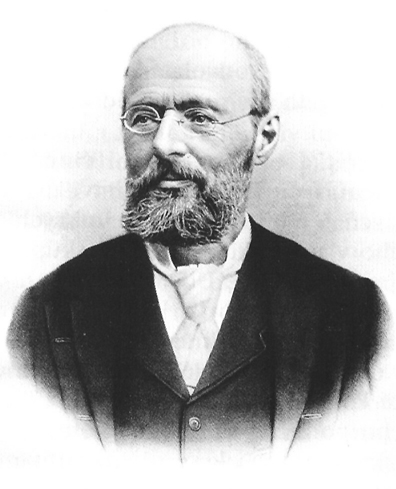
Engineer and industrialist Emil Škoda

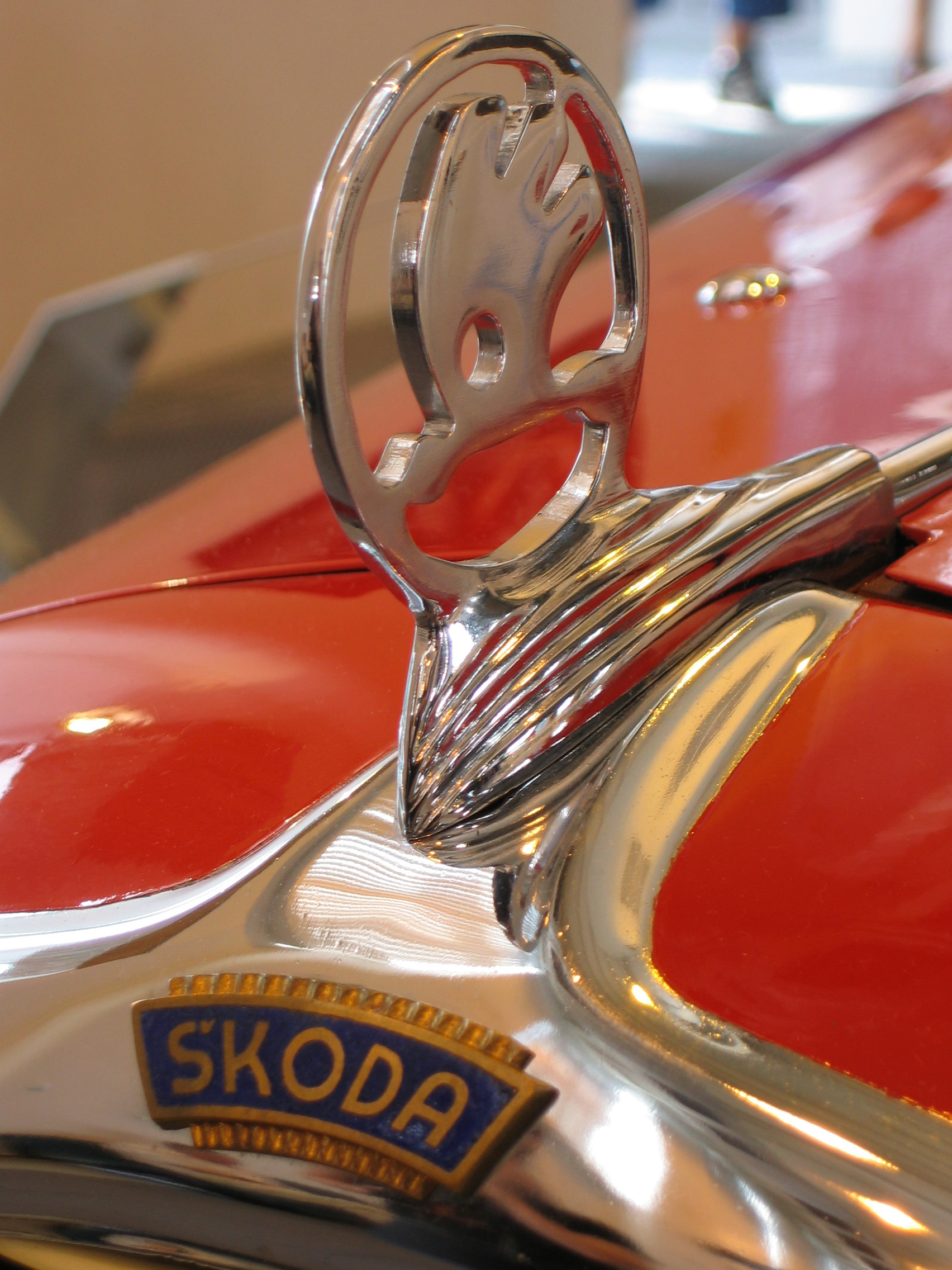
Škoda logo in 1930s

After World War I, Laurin & Klement faced increased competition from car makers like Praga, together with financial pressure. A fire damaged its Mladá Boleslav factory in 1924, adding to the need for a partner to finance modernisations. In 1925, Laurin & Klement merged with Škoda Works, an machinery and arms manufacturer based in Plzeň. The merger provided funds to modernise the factory and access to new markets through Škoda's overseas network. The Škoda name gradually replaced Laurin & Klement on its cars. The Mladá Boleslav factory was expanded after the merger, and assembly-line production began in 1929. Škoda began experimenting with rear-engined cars in 1932 with the Škoda 932 prototype, powered by an air-cooled flat-four engine.

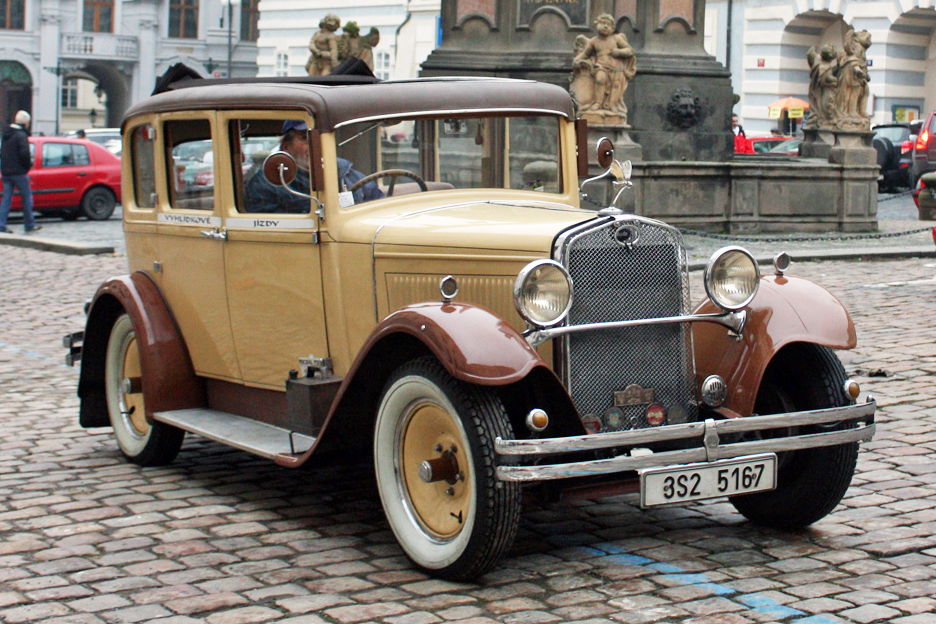
Škoda 422 (1929)

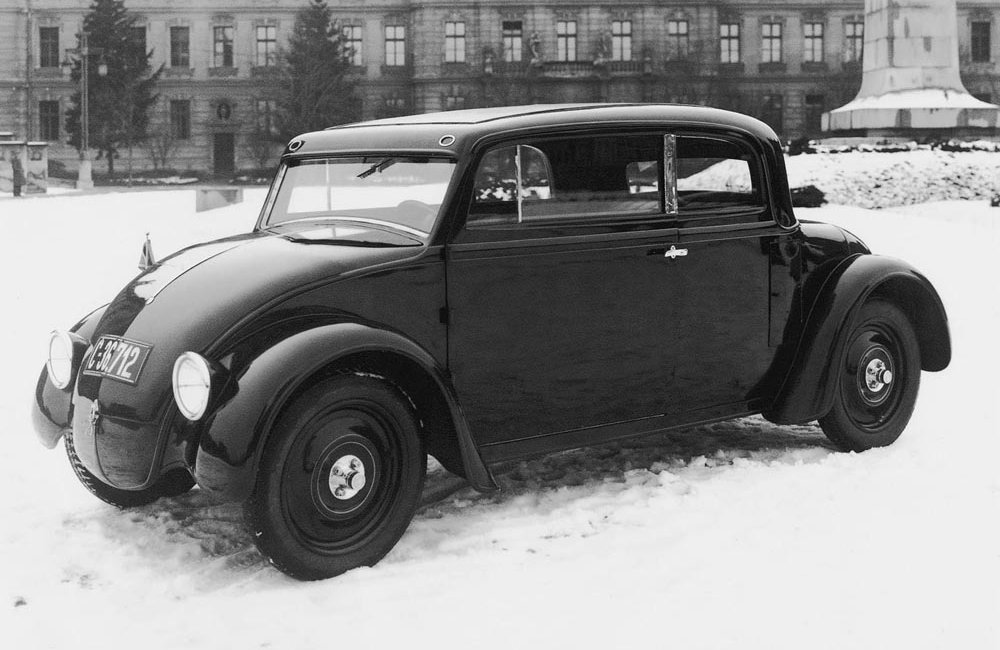
Škoda 932 prototype, 1932

During the Great Depression, Škoda developed lighter, more affordable cars using backbone chassis. Introduced in 1933, the Škoda 420 Standard had independent rear suspension and a backbone chassis designed by Josef Zubatý. The Popular followed in 1934 with a tubular backbone chassis and independent suspension on all four wheels. Škoda also adopted the backbone chassis for the Rapid, Favorit and Superb. In 1933, Škoda ranked third in the Czechoslovak car market after Praga and Tatra, with a share of about 14%. Škoda became the market leader again in 1936, and its share reached 39% in 1938.

=== World War II ===
During the occupation of Czechoslovakia in World War II, the Škoda Works were turned into part of the Reichswerke Hermann Göring serving the Nazi German war effort by producing components for military terrain vehicles, military planes, other weapons components, and cartridge cases. Vehicle output decreased from 7,052 in 1939 to 683 in 1944, of which only 35 were passenger cars. Between January and May 1945, 316 trucks were produced. The UK and US air forces bombed the Škoda works repeatedly between 1940 and 1945. The final massive air raid took place on 25 April 1945, and resulted in the near-complete destruction of the Škoda armament works and about 1,000 dead or wounded.

=== Post-World War II ===
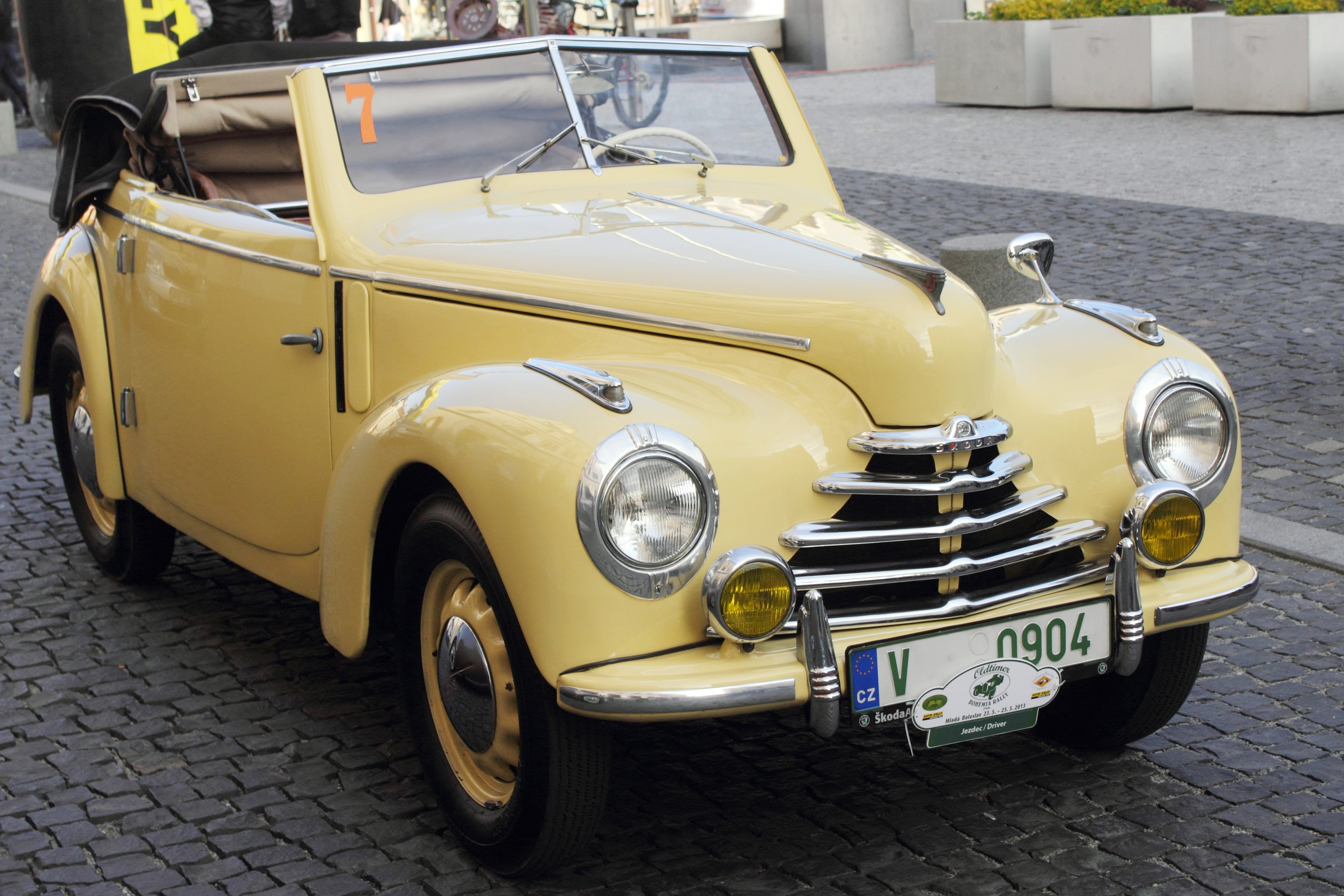
Škoda 1101 Tudor Roadster (1949)

When, by July 1945, the Mladá Boleslav factory had been reconstructed, production of Škoda's first post-World War II car, the 1101 series, began. It was essentially an updated version of the pre-World War II Škoda Popular. In the autumn of 1948, Škoda (along with all other large manufacturers) became part of the communist planned economy, which meant it was separated from the parent company, Škoda Works. Despite unfavourable political conditions and losing contact with technical development in noncommunist countries, Škoda retained a good reputation until the 1960s, producing models such as the Škoda 440 Spartak, 445 Octavia, Felicia, and Škoda 1000 MB.

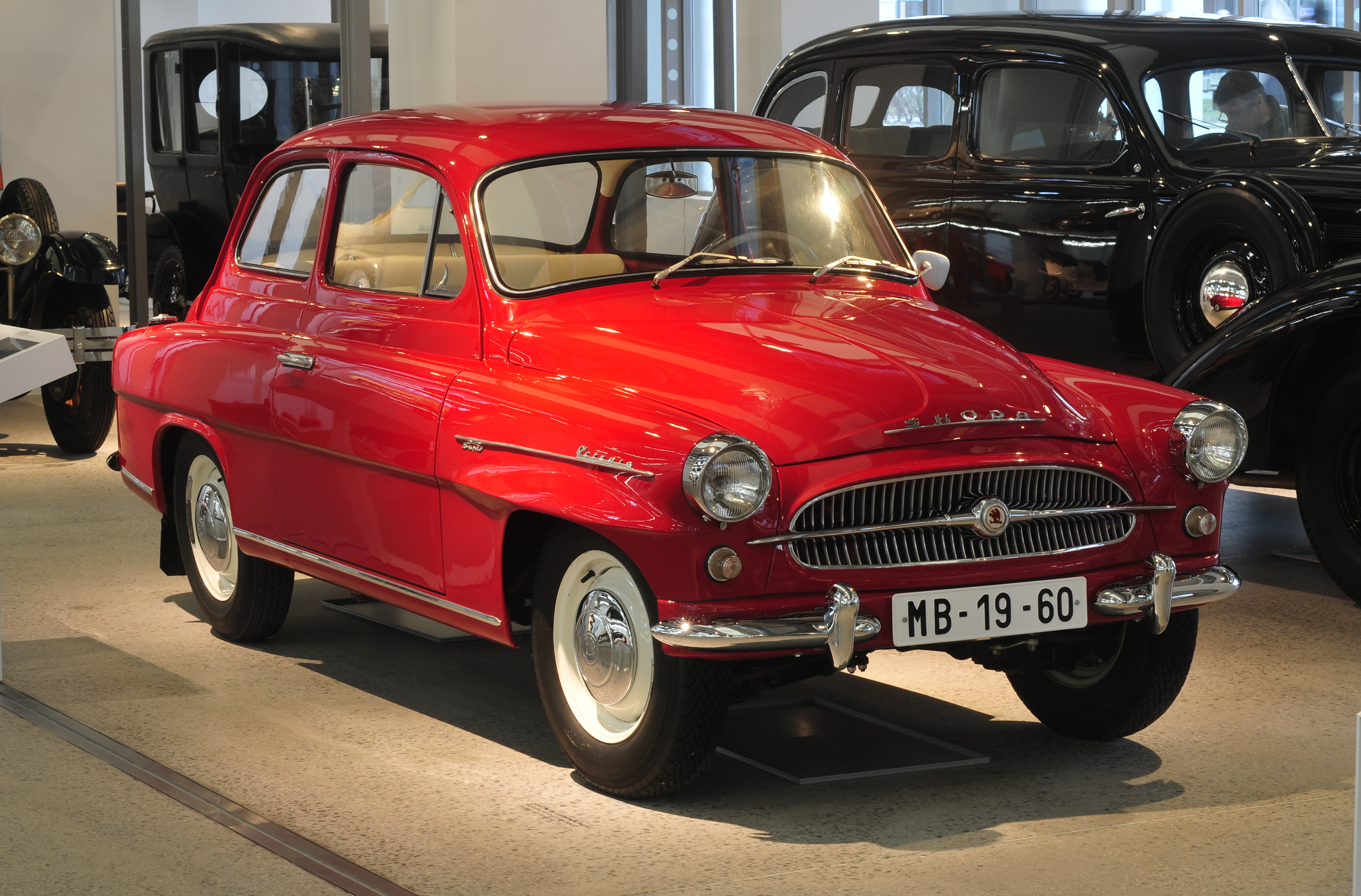
Škoda Octavia Super (1960)

Starting in 1957, the Škoda Octavia, and later the Felicia, were imported to the United States amid a wave of new imports as some American consumers sought out cars smaller than typical Detroit offerings. Škoda’s American dealerships, concentrated on the West Coast and in the Northeast, quickly encountered buyer resistance due to the Cold War political climate in ways that comparable Western European cars did not. The cars were also not well supported after sale, making even minor repairs difficult. U.S. sales peaked in 1959 but fell sharply after 1960, and many were sold at steep discounts. A few later cars, including 1000MB models, were sold in the U.S. as late as 1966-67, but in very small numbers. Škoda has not sold vehicles in the U.S. since then, but did sell cars in Canada from 1984 to 1990.

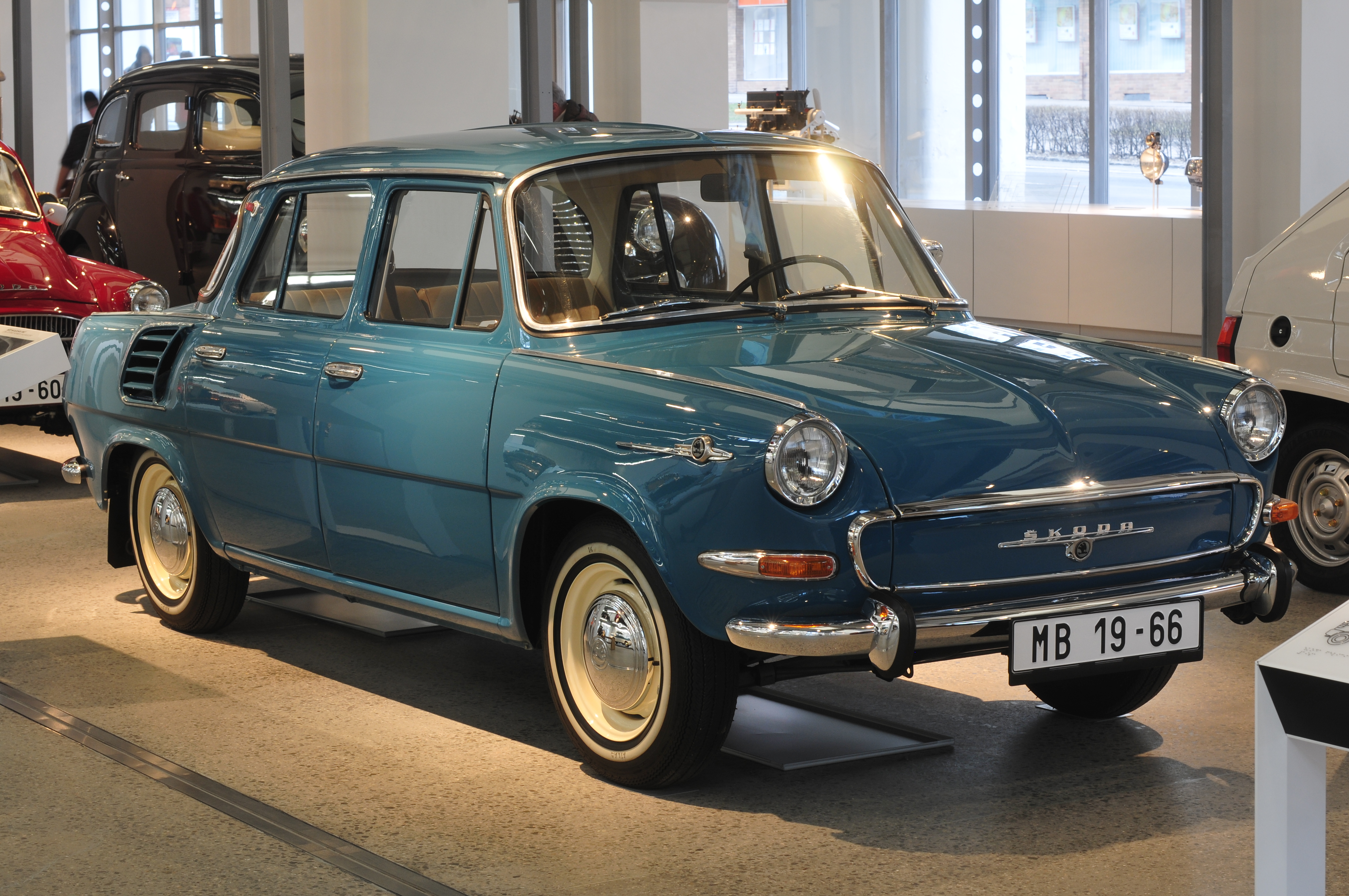
Škoda MB 1000 (1966)

In the late 1980s, Škoda (then named Automobilové závody, národní podnik or abbreviated AZNP) was still manufacturing cars that conceptually dated back to the 1960s, and in Western Europe at least, were aimed squarely at the budget end of the market. Rear-engined models such as the Škoda 105/120 (Estelle) and Rapid sold steadily and performed well against more modern makes in races such as the RAC Rally in the 1970s and 1980s. They won their class in the RAC rally for 17 years running. They were powered by a 130 PS (96 kW), 1,289 cc (78.7 cu in) engine. –Škodas remained a common sight on the roads of the United Kingdom and Western Europe throughout the 1970s and 1980s.

Sport versions of the Estelle and earlier models were produced, using the name "Rapid" (originally sold as the Garde in some markets). Soft-top versions were also available. The Rapid was once described as the "poor man's Porsche", and had significant sales success in the UK during the 1980s.

To drivers in the UK, the vehicles which chugged off Škoda's production line in Pilsen, Czechoslovakia, embodied all that was wrong with the planned economies of the Soviet satellite states. Of course, the Škoda became such a figure of fun in part due to its ubiquity on Britain's roads. The company must have been doing something right.

— BBC report on Škoda sales in the 1980s.

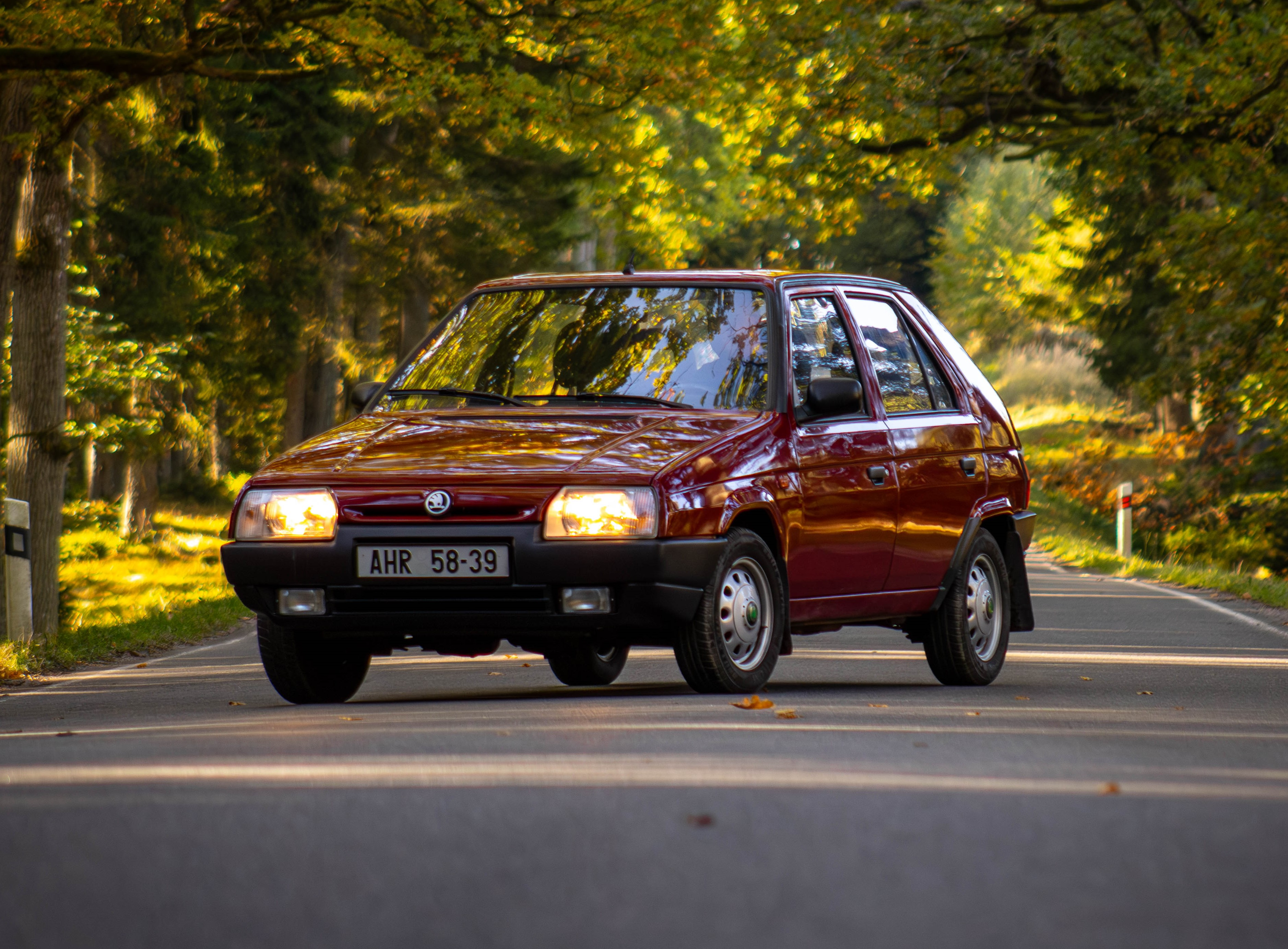
Škoda Favorit (1987–1995)

In 1987, the Favorit was introduced, and was one of a trio of compact front-wheel drive hatchbacks from the three main Eastern Bloc manufacturers around that time, the others being VAZ's Lada Samara and Zastava's Yugo Sana. The Favorit's appearance was the work of Italian design company Bertone. With some motor technology licensed from Western Europe, but still using the Škoda-designed 1289 cc engine, Škoda engineers designed a car comparable to Western production. The technological gap still existed, but began closing rapidly. The Favorit was very popular in Czechoslovakia and other Eastern Bloc countries. It also sold well in Western Europe, especially in the UK and Denmark, due to its low price, and was regarded as solid and reliable. However, it was perceived as having poor value compared with contemporary Western European designs. The Favorit's trim levels were improved, and it continued to be sold until the introduction of the Felicia in 1994.

=== Volkswagen Group subsidiary ===
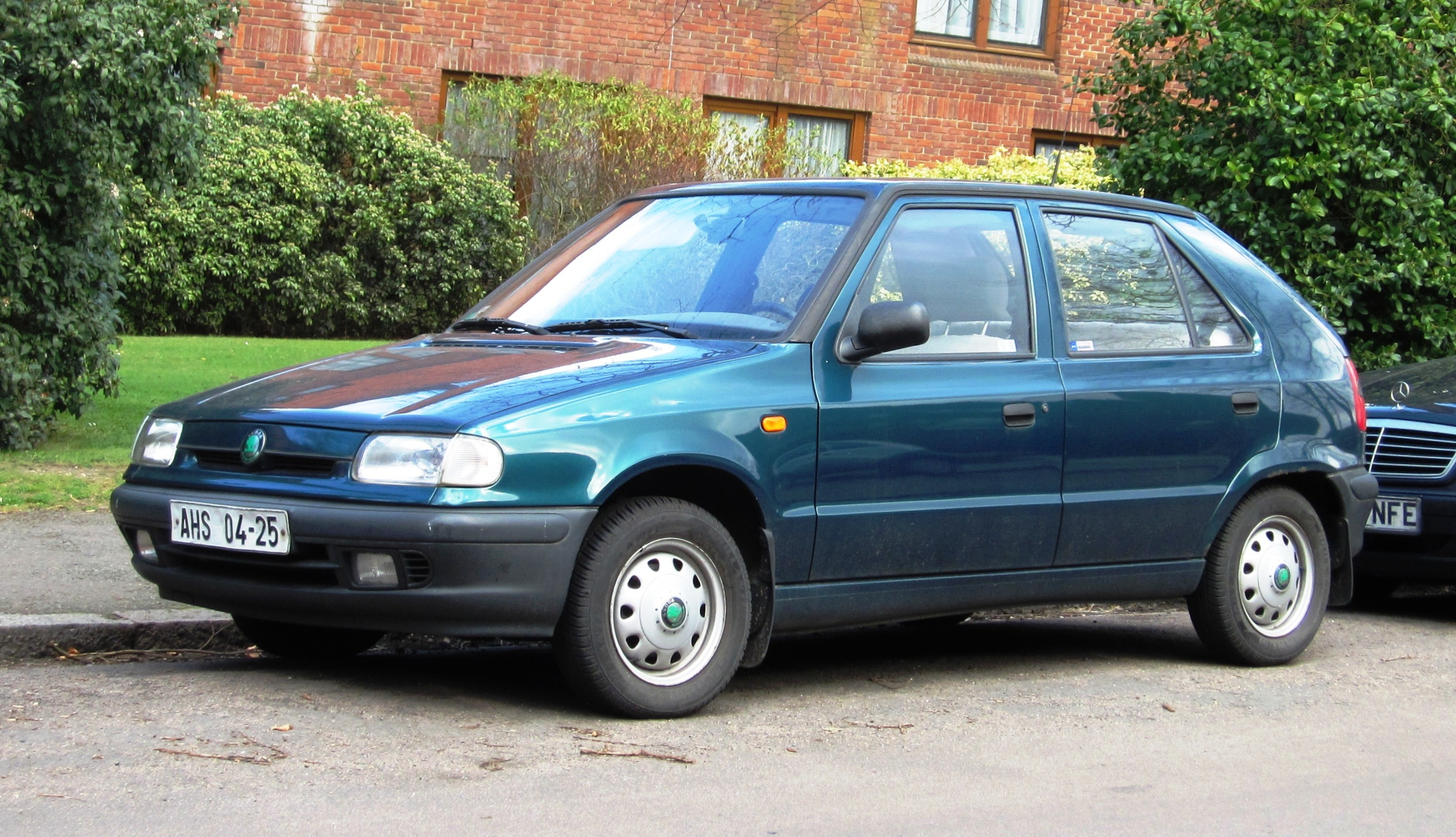
The Škoda Felicia from 1994 was the first new model manufactured after a takeover by Volkswagen Group.

Until 1990, Škoda was still making its outdated range of rear-engined small family cars, although it had started production of the Favorit front-wheel drive hatchback in 1987 as an eventual replacement.

The fall of communism with the Velvet Revolution brought great changes to Czechoslovakia, and most industries were subject to privatization. In the case of Škoda Automobile, the state authorities brought in a strong foreign partner. The tender for privatization was announced in 1990; 24 different companies were registered for the tender, while only eight of them expressed a serious interest – BMW, GM, Renault, Volvo, Volkswagen, Ford, Fiat, and Mercedes-Benz. In August 1990, VW and Renault were on the shortlist. Renault first offered to terminate Favorit production and replace it with the outdated Renault 18 derivative and new Renault Twingo, which would have eliminated the Škoda brand. This offer was declined, and Renault prepared a new one. They offered a 60:40 joint venture (40% share of Renault), while Škoda Favorit production was to be retained and produced side by side with the Renault 19, and producing engine units, gearboxes, and other components for Renault. Total investment would have been US$2.6 billion (US$6 billion in 2019).

Volkswagen offered to continue Favorit production and preserve the Škoda brand, including retention of research and development. Volkswagen offered a purchase of 30% Škoda share, gradually increasing to 70%. Volkswagen's total investment would have been US$6.6 billion (US$16 billion in 2019) by 2000. The government inclined on the Renault side, while the Škoda trade union preferred VW, because it offered significantly larger potential for development of the company.

Volkswagen was chosen by the Czech government on 9 December 1990, and as a result, on 28 March 1991 a joint-venture partnership agreement with Volkswagen took place, marked by the transfer of a 30% share to the Volkswagen Group on 16 April 1991, raised later on 19 December 1994 to 60.3% and the year after, on 11 December 1995, to 70% of its shares, to make VW the largest and controlling shareholder of Škoda. On 30 May 2000, Volkswagen AG bought the remaining 30% of the company, thus making Škoda Auto a wholly owned subsidiary of the group. Backed by Volkswagen Group expertise and investments, the design–both style and engineering–has improved greatly. The 1994 model Felicia was effectively a reskin of the Favorit, but quality and equipment improvements helped, and in the Czech Republic, the car was perceived as a good value for money and became popular. Sales improved across Europe, including the United Kingdom, where the Felicia was one of the highest-ranking cars in customer satisfaction surveys.

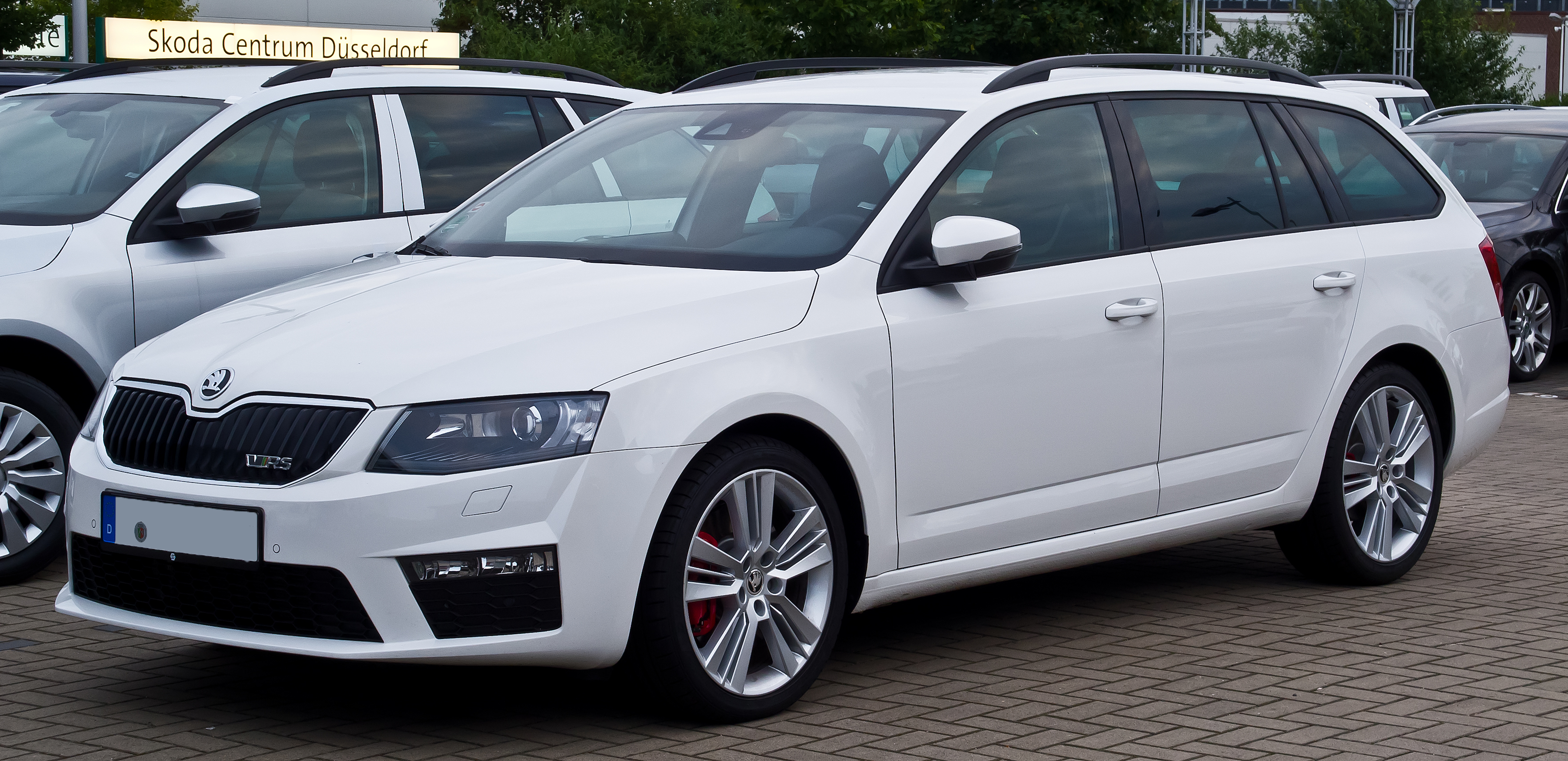
The Octavia is the bestselling Škoda model.

Volkswagen AG chairman Ferdinand Piëch personally chose Dirk van Braeckel as head of design, and the subsequent Octavia and Fabia models made their way to the demanding European Union markets. They are built on common Volkswagen Group floorpans. The Fabia, launched at the end of 1999, formed the basis for later versions of the Volkswagen Polo and SEAT Ibiza, while the Octavia, launched in 1996, has shared its floorpan with a host of cars, the most popular of which is the Volkswagen Golf Mk4.

The perception of Škoda in Western Europe has completely changed since the takeover by VW, in stark comparison with the reputation of the cars throughout the 1980s described by some as "the laughing stock" of the automotive world. As technical development progressed and attractive new models were marketed, Škoda's image was initially slow to improve. In the UK, a major change was achieved with the ironic "It is a Škoda, honest" campaign, which began in 2000 when the Fabia was launched. In a 2003 advertisement on British television, a new employee on the production line is fitting Škoda badges on the car bonnets. When some attractive-looking cars come along, he stands back, not fitting the badge, since they look so good they "cannot be Škodas". This market campaign worked by confronting Škoda's image problem head-on – a tactic which marketing professionals regarded as high risk. By 2005, Škoda was selling over 30,000 cars a year in the UK, a market share of over 1%. For the first time in its UK history, a waiting list developed for deliveries from Škoda. UK owners have consistently ranked the brand at or near the top of customer-satisfaction surveys since the late 1990s.

In 1991, Škoda built 172,000 units, exporting 26% of its production to 30 countries, while in 2000, it built 435,000 units, exporting 82% of its production to 72 countries.

=== Growth strategy ===
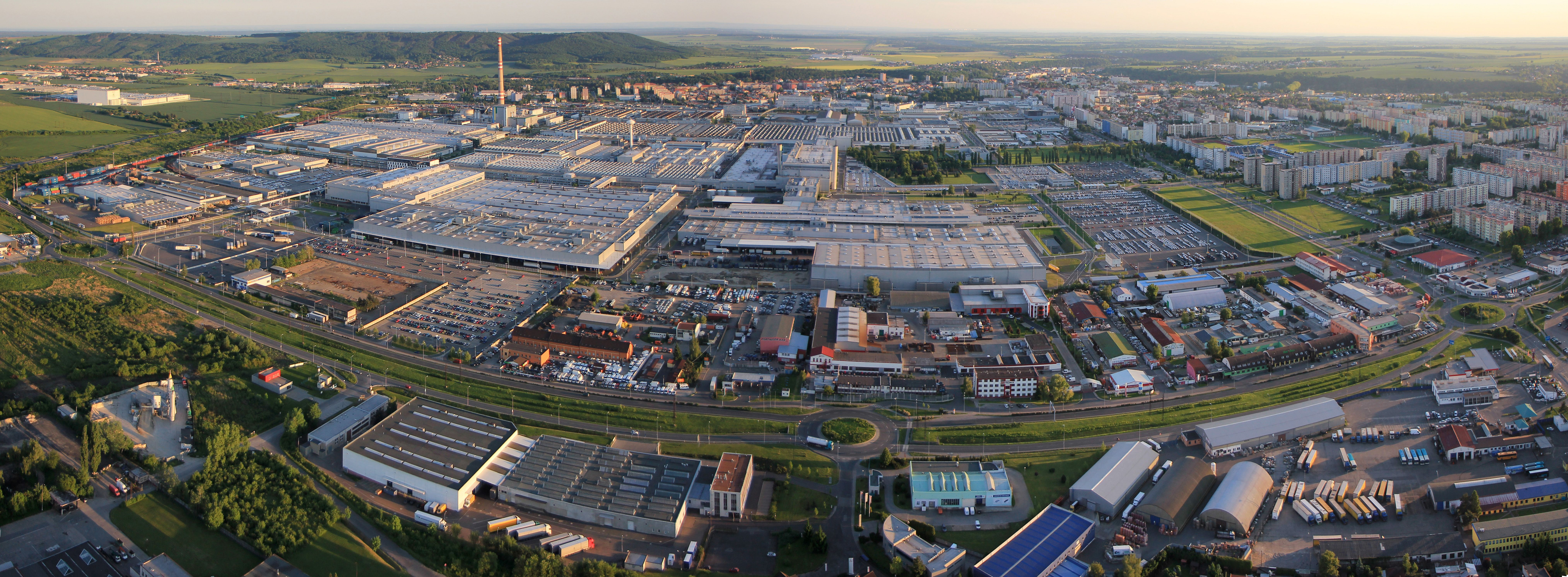
Škoda Auto plant in Mladá Boleslav, Czech Republic

One of the most important years for Škoda Auto was 2010, in terms of both products and management. On 1 September 2010, Prof. Dr. H.C. Winfried Vahland assumed responsibility for the management of the company, becoming the CEO of Škoda Auto. In the same year, Škoda set forth plans to double the company's annual sales to at least 1.5 million by 2018 (later known as the 'Growth Strategy', Czech: Růstová strategie).

At the 2010 Paris Motor Show in September 2010, the company unveiled the Octavia Green E Line. This e-car concept was the forerunner to the e-car test fleet that Škoda released in 2012. The final first-generation Octavia (Tour) was produced at the Mladá Boleslav plant in November 2010. The worldwide production of this model has exceeded 1.4 million units since its release in 1996. In 2010, for the first time in history, China overtook Germany in sales to become Škoda's largest individual market. In 2011, Škoda Auto celebrated its 20-year partnership with the Volkswagen Group. More than 75,000 visitors attended an open-house event held in Mladá Boleslav in April. Earlier that year, the company provided details on its 2018 Growth Strategy: for at least one new or completely revised model to be released every six months. With this in mind, the company redesigned its logo and CI, which was presented at the 2011 Geneva Motor Show. Škoda's main attraction at the event was the VisionD design concept, a forerunner to the future third-generation Octavia. Škoda presented the MissionL design study at the IAA in Frankfurt am Main in September, which was to become the basis of the company's forthcoming compact model, the European Rapid.

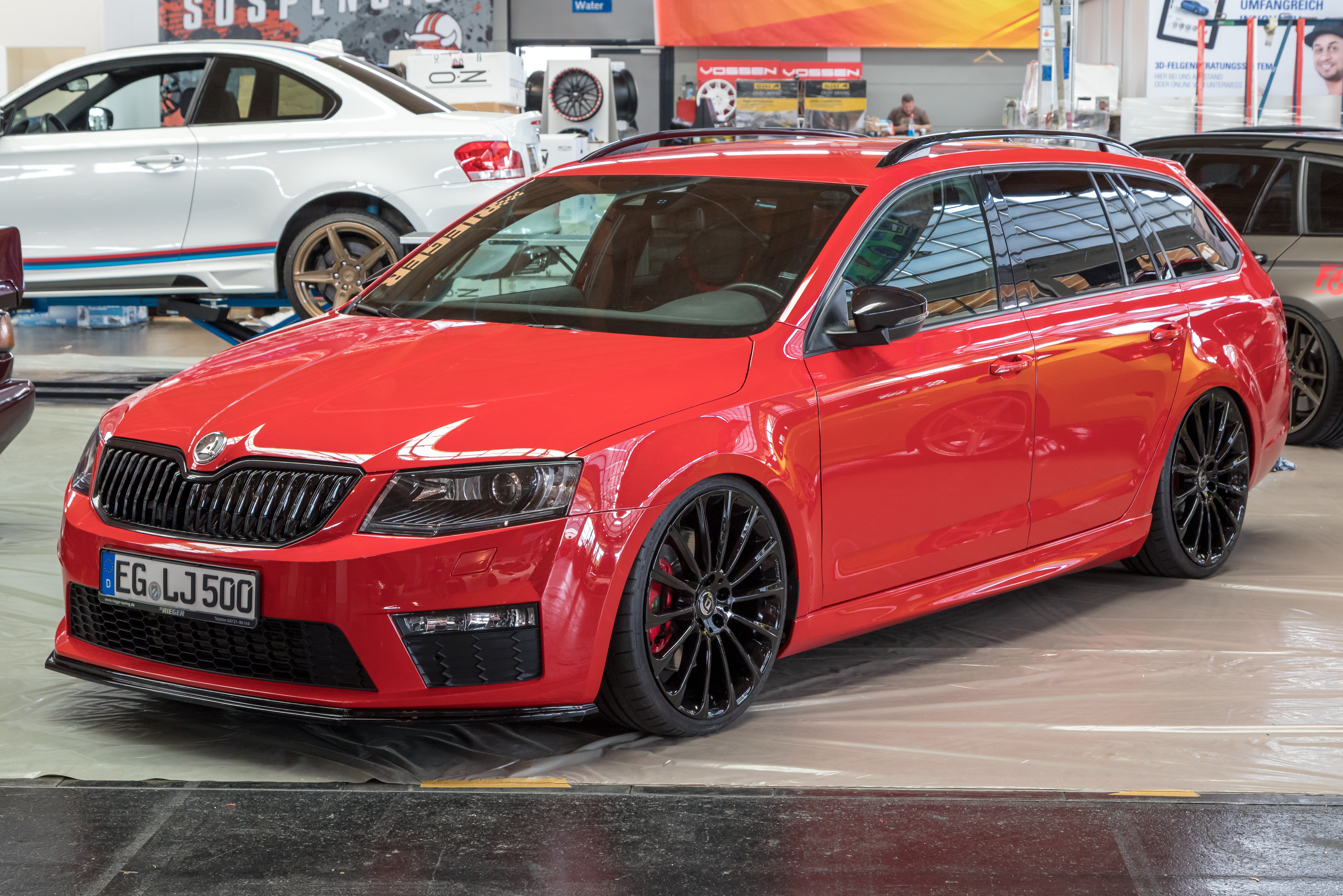
Škoda Auto is one of the largest car manufacturers in Central Europe. In 2018, 1,253,700 cars were sold worldwide, a record for the company.

In the same year, the company started production of the new Rapid model in Pune, India (October 2011), and launched the Škoda Citigo at Volkswagen's Bratislava plant (November 2011). In 2012, Škoda introduced two new mass production models. The European version of the Rapid premiered at the Paris Motor Show. This car was a successor to the first-generation Octavia in terms of its price bracket. The second model was the third-generation Octavia, which premiered in December 2012. In the same month, local production of the Yeti was launched at the Nizhny Novgorod GAZ factory.

In 2012, Škoda introduced an emission-free (on the street) fleet of Octavia Green E Line e-cars on Czech roads to be used by external partners. Since internal tests on the fleet in late 2011, the e-fleet had driven more than 250,000 km (150,000 miles). During the same year, Škoda celebrated several milestones, including 14 million Škoda cars being produced since 1905 (January), three million Fabias (May), 500,000 Superbs at the Kvasiny plant (June), and 5 years of Škoda operations in China.

Massive rejuvenation of the model range was a major tune for 2013 at Škoda: The Czech car maker launched the third-generation Octavia Combi and Octavia RS (both liftback and estate), as well as facelifted Superb and Superb Combi. They were accompanied by brand new members of the Rapid family as the Rapid Spaceback, the first Škoda hatchback car in the compact segment, and the Chinese version of the Rapid. The Yeti also faced significant changes. With the facelift, two design variants of Škoda's compact SUV are now available, the city-oriented Yeti and rugged Yeti Outdoor. Chinese customers were also given a Yeti with an extended wheelbase.

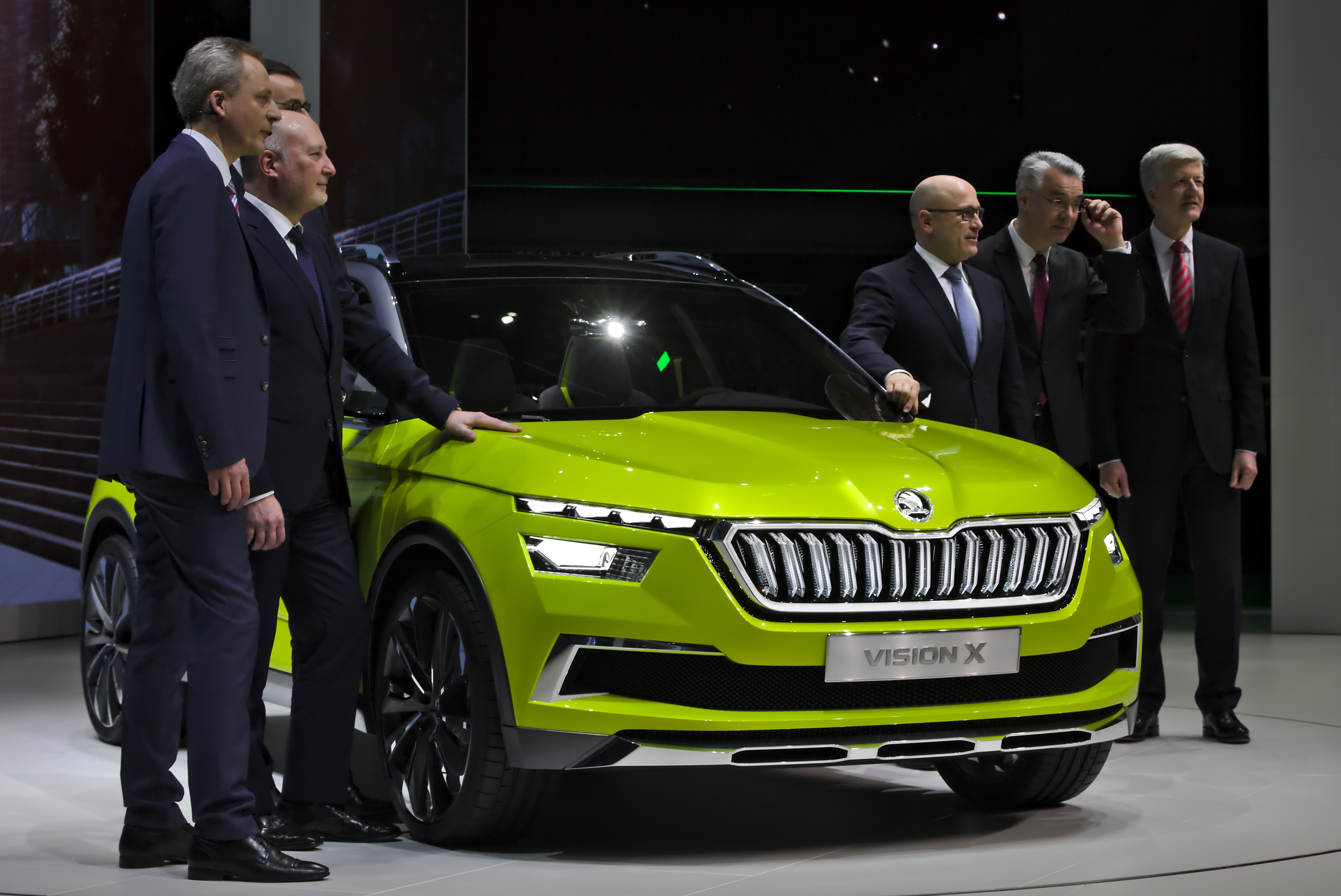
Part of the board of directors at the Geneva Motor Show with Škoda Vision X (2018): from left Christian Strube, Klaus-Dieter Schürmann, Alain Favey, Bernhard Maier, Michael Oeljeklaus, and Dieter Seemann

In 2015, Volkswagen admitted that it had installed pollution-cheating software in many of its cars to fool regulators that its cars met emissions standards, when in fact they polluted at much higher levels than government standards. About 1.2 million Škoda cars worldwide were fitted with this emissions-cheating device. Škoda said that Volkswagen would recall and cover refitting costs for all of the cars affected by the scandal. In 2015, Škoda was voted the most reliable car brand in the UK. A corporate strategy was launched in 2015 to produce a range of all-electric cars from 2019.

Škoda Auto began manufacturing the large, seven-seat SUV Škoda Kodiaq in 2016, it was introduced at the Paris Motor Show in October 2016, and sales began at early 2017. In the second half of 2017, sales began of the new compact SUV Škoda Karoq, which officially replaced the Škoda Yeti. The automaker introduced in December 2018 a new small family car, the Škoda Scala. In February 2019, the company introduced in Geneva the new subcompact crossover Škoda Kamiq.

== Leadership ==
- Ludvik Kalma (1991–1996)
- Vratislav Kulhánek (1996–2004)
- Detlef Wittig (2004–2007)
- Reihnhard Jung (2007–2010)
- Winfried Vahlung (2010–2015)
- Bernhard Maier (2015–2020)
- Thomas Schäfer (2020–2022)
- Klaus Zellmer (2022–present)

== Electrification ==
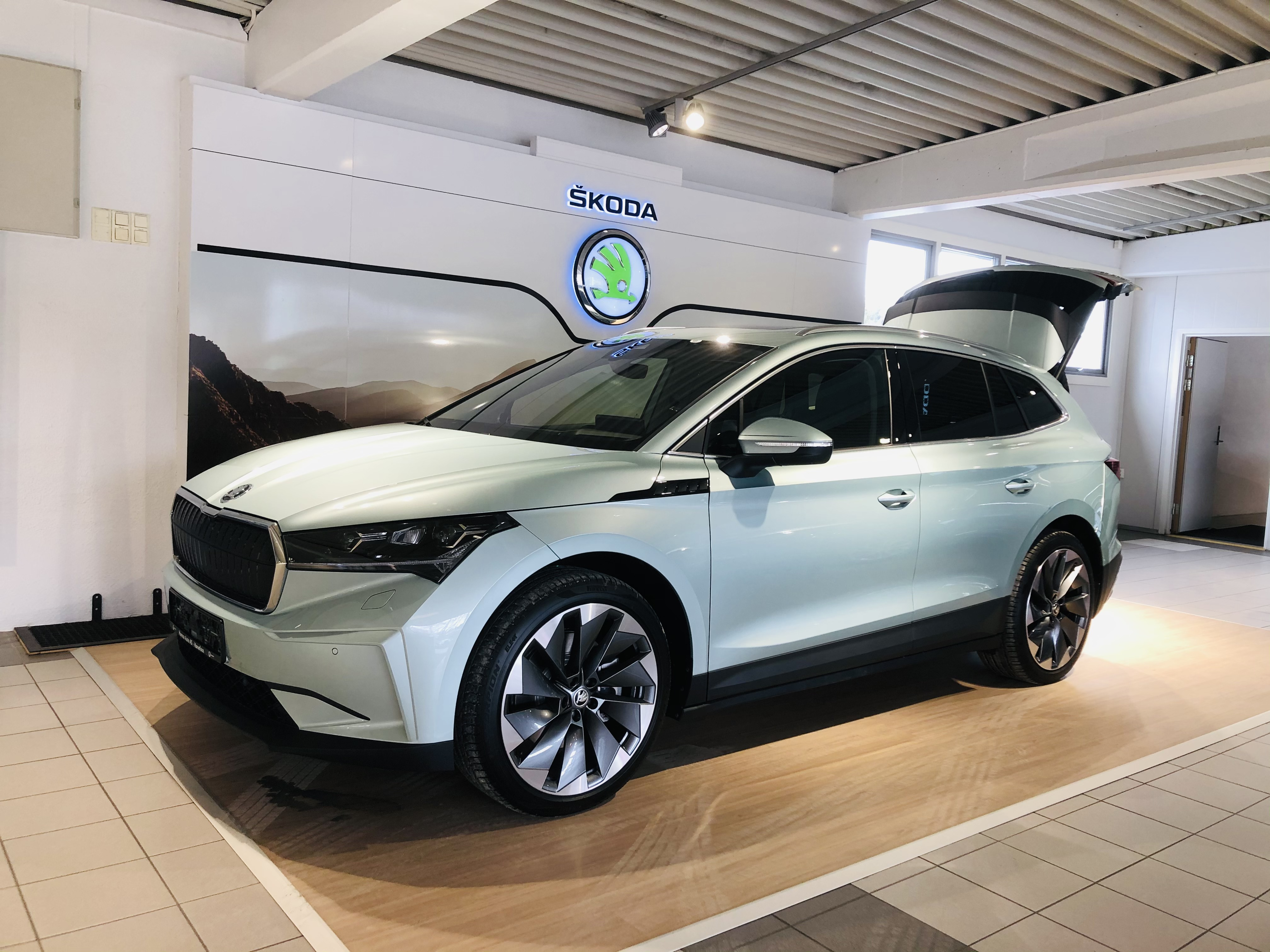
The Škoda Enyaq has been produced since November 2020.

In 2016, Škoda chairman Bernhard Maier said there was "no alternative to electrification" and confirmed that the company was participating in Volkswagen Group's development of a modular platform for electric vehicles. Škoda's Strategy 2025 included plans to introduce electric cars and plug-in hybrids. In 2017, the company said it intended to offer five fully electric models across different segments by 2025. The following year, it announced plans to invest €2 billion in electric mobility and digitalisation over five years.

Škoda presented the Vision E, an electric SUV coupé concept based on the MEB platform, at Auto Shanghai in April 2017. The Vision iV concept followed at the Geneva Motor Show in March 2019. The Citigo-e iV and Superb iV were unveiled in May 2019. The Citigo was the brand's first fully electric production model, while the Superb introduced plug-in hybrid drive to the range. The Enyaq was unveiled in September 2020 as Škoda's first production car to use the MEB platform. Production began at Mladá Boleslav in November that year.

A further five-year investment of €5.6 billion in electric mobility was announced in August 2022. The plan set a target of more than 70% battery-electric cars in Škoda's European sales by 2030. In October 2024, the company decided to keep selling the petrol-powered Fabia, Scala and Kamiq until 2030.

The Elroq, a smaller electric SUV, was unveiled in October 2024. Production began in January 2025 at Mladá Boleslav, on the same assembly line as the Enyaq. In 2026, the Epiq became Škoda's first model to use Volkswagen Group's MEB+ platform, designed for compact electric vehicles with front-wheel drive.

In the first half of 2026, Škoda delivered over 100,000 battery-electric cars and 24,000 plug-in hybrids. According to the company, it was Europe's fourth-best-selling electric car brand during that period.

== Research and development ==
Škoda’s main research and development site is in Česana, Mladá Boleslav. Its Technology and Development Centre develops components and vehicles, and builds prototypes. The company reported spending €1.02 billion on research and development in 2025.

Škoda also develops vehicles and technology for other Volkswagen Group brands. In 2021, it took responsibility for developing the group’s MQB-A0 platform. It also led the joint development of the fourth-generation Superb and Volkswagen Passat.

In 2023, Škoda announced plans to take responsibility for developing Volkswagen Group’s entire EA211 petrol-engine range. Its engineers also work on engine-control software and diagnostics.

Škoda’s Virtual Development Centre opened in 2024 to assess vehicle designs using digital models. Its Simulation Centre opened the same year to test powertrains under simulated climatic and driving conditions. At Úhelnice, the company tests driver-assistance systems and carries out crash tests for Škoda and other Volkswagen Group brands.

=== University collaboration ===
Škoda Auto collaborates with Czech technical universities on vehicle development and manufacturing technologies. With the Czech Technical University in Prague (ČVUT), it jointly operates the Automotive R&D 4.0 laboratory, where researchers use driving simulators to develop vehicle interfaces and driver-assistance systems. Researchers at ČVUT have also developed machine learning software with Škoda Auto engineers to analyse computational fluid dynamics simulations and identify possible improvements in vehicle aerodynamics

In collaboration with Brno University of Technology, Škoda Auto developed an active aerodynamic-control system, demonstrated on an experimental Škoda Fabia. The university and carmaker were granted a joint Czech patent for the invention in August 2026.

=== Software development ===
Škoda develops software through its internal teams and the jointly owned companies Green:Code and Digiteq Automotive.

Green:Code is a joint venture between Škoda and Etnetera Group, which develops the MyŠkoda mobile app. The app shows vehicle status and provides remote controls for charging and climate adjustment.

Digiteq Automotive is a Prague-based subsidiary of Škoda and CARIAD. Its team develops Reversing Assist for several Group brands. Its work includes camera-based software for monitoring driver attention, and components of vehicle operating systems.

Škoda internal teams integrate vehicles’ infotainment systems, combining shared Volkswagen Group software with functions specific to Škoda models. Škoda also develops on-board diagnostic software for the Volkswagen Group’s EA211 engine family, and has group-wide responsibility for the functional safety of engine software.

Škoda’s SAP Competence Centre in Prague develops applications based on SAP for Volkswagen Group companies, including Audi, Porsche and Traton. Its work covers accounting, warranty payments and spare-parts logistics.

== Sales and markets ==
Its slogan was “Simply Clever” until 2022, when a new brand identity and a new slogan "Let's Explore" were introduced. Škoda has maintained sound financial stability over recent years. In 2013, the brand achieved sales revenues totalling €10.3 billion (2012: €10.4 billion). Due to the weak economic situation in many European countries and the expansion of the model range, operating profit reached a modest €522 million (2012: €712 million). Škoda achieved a successful start to 2014. As well as recording the highest number of deliveries to customers in a first quarter ever (247,200; up 12.1%), it recorded a significant increase in sales revenue (23.7%) to almost €3 billion. Operating profit increased 65.2% to €185 million over the previous year.

=== Sales figures ===
Model
Škoda Felicia
Škoda Octavia
Škoda Fabia
Škoda Superb
Škoda Roomster
Škoda Yeti
Škoda Rapid
Škoda Citigo
Škoda Kodiaq
Škoda Karoq
Škoda Kamiq
Škoda Scala
Škoda Enyaq
Škoda Kushaq
Škoda Slavia
Škoda Elroq
Škoda Kylaq
Total

| Total | 1994 | 1995 | 1996 | 1997 | 1998 | 1999 | 2000 | 2001 | 2002 | 2003 | 2004 | 2005 | 2006 | 2007 | 2008 | 2009 | 2010 | 2011 | 2012 | 2013 | 2014 | 2015 | 2016 | 2017 | 2018 | 2019 | 2020 | 2021 | 2022 | 2023 | 2024 | 2025 |
|---|---|---|---|---|---|---|---|---|---|---|---|---|---|---|---|---|---|---|---|---|---|---|---|---|---|---|---|---|---|---|---|---|
| 1,627,304 | 172,000 | 210,000 | 261,000 | 288,458 | 261,127 | 241,256 | 148,500 | 44,963 | − | − | − | − | − | − | − | − | − | − | − | − | − | − | − | − | – | – | - | - | - | - | - | - |
| 7,734,918 | − | − | − | 47,876 | 102,373 | 143,251 | 158,503 | 164,134 | 164,017 | 165,635 | 181,683 | 233,322 | 270,274 | 309,951 | 344,857 | 317,335 | 349,746 | 387,200 | 409,360 | 359,600 | 389,300 | 432,300 | 436,300 | 418,800 | 388,200 | 363,722 | 257,364 | 200,771 | 141,112 | 191,941 | 215,716 | 190,275 |
| 5,084,850 | − | − | − | − | − | 823 | 128,872 | 250,978 | 264,641 | 260,988 | 247,600 | 236,698 | 243,982 | 232,890 | 246,561 | 264,173 | 229,045 | 266,800 | 255,025 | 202,000 | 160,500 | 192,400 | 202,800 | 206,500 | 190,900 | 172,793 | 105,459 | 99,104 | 92,663 | 94,395 | 117,121 | 119,139 |
| 1,746,617 | − | − | − | − | − | − | − | 177 | 16,867 | 23,135 | 22,392 | 22,091 | 20,989 | 20,530 | 25,645 | 44,548 | 98,873 | 116,700 | 106,847 | 94,400 | 91,100 | 80,200 | 139,100 | 150,900 | 138,100 | 104,755 | 86,151 | 66,146 | 60,840 | 67,446 | 72,800 | 75,885 |
| 372,783 | − | − | − | − | − | − | − | − | − | − | − | − | 14,422 | 66,661 | 57,467 | 47,152 | 32,332 | 36,000 | 39,249 | 33,300 | 29,600 | 16,600 | − | − | – | – | - | - | - | - | - | - |
| 687,886 | − | − | − | − | − | − | − | − | − | − | − | − | − | − | − | 11,018 | 52,604 | 70,300 | 90,952 | 82,400 | 102,900 | 99,500 | 95,600 | 69,500 | 13,100 | 10 | 2 | - | - | - | - | - |
| 1,452,347 | − | − | − | − | − | − | − | − | − | − | − | − | − | − | − | − | − | 1,700 | 9,292 | 103,800 | 221,400 | 194,300 | 212,800 | 211,500 | 191,500 | 142,118 | 79,702 | 63,657 | 17,296 | 3,282 | - | - |
| 332,642 | − | − | − | − | − | − | − | − | − | − | − | − | − | − | − | − | − | 509 | 36,687 | 45,200 | 42,500 | 40,200 | 40,700 | 37,100 | 39,200 | 31,199 | 14,971 | 4,373 | 3 | - | - | - |
| 1,096,279 | − | − | − | − | − | − | − | − | − | − | − | − | − | − | − | − | − | − | − | − | − | − | − | 100,000 | 149,200 | 171,794 | 131,590 | 98,566 | 94,455 | 105,857 | 114,457 | 130,360 |
| 930,901 | − | − | − | − | − | − | − | − | − | − | − | − | − | − | − | − | − | − | − | − | − | − | − | 6,300 | 115,700 | 152,708 | 137,223 | 119,156 | 87,716 | 100,052 | 109,404 | 102,642 |
| 806,329 | − | − | − | − | − | − | − | − | − | − | − | − | − | − | − | − | − | − | − | − | − | − | − | – | 27,900 | 64,597 | 128,539 | 120,742 | 96,269 | 116,461 | 125,962 | 125,859 |
| 358,473 | − | − | − | − | − | − | − | − | − | − | − | − | − | − | − | − | − | − | − | − | − | − | − | − | − | 39,071 | 63,181 | 48,154 | 39,538 | 59,229 | 56,248 | 53,052 |
| 339,779 | − | − | − | − | − | − | − | − | − | − | − | − | − | − | − | − | − | − | − | − | − | − | − | − | − | − | 634 | 44,718 | 53,678 | 81,650 | 79,507 | 79,592 |
| 98,680 | − | − | − | − | − | − | − | − | − | − | − | − | − | − | − | − | − | − | − | − | − | − | − | − | − | − | − | 12,815 | 26,761 | 26,603 | 19,313 | 13,188 |
| 71,576 | − | − | − | − | − | − | − | − | − | − | − | − | − | − | − | − | − | − | − | − | − | − | − | − | − | − | − | - | 20,931 | 19,904 | 15,993 | 14,748 |
| 95,339 | − | − | − | − | − | − | − | − | − | − | − | − | − | − | − | − | − | − | − | − | − | − | − | − | − | − | − | - | - | - | 46 | 95,293 |
| 43,905 | − | − | − | − | − | − | − | − | − | − | − | − | − | − | − | − | − | − | − | − | − | − | − | − | − | − | − | - | - | - | - | 43,905 |
| 21,836,670 | 172,000 | 210,000 | 261,000 | 336,334 | 363,500 | 385,330 | 435,403 | 460,252 | 445,525 | 449,758 | 451,675 | 492,111 | 549,667 | 630,032 | 674,530 | 684,226 | 762,600 | 879,200 | 949,412 | 920,800 | 1,037,200 | 1,055,500 | 1,127,700 | 1,200,500 | 1,253,700 | 1,242,816 | 1,004,816 | 878,202 | 731,262 | 866,820 | 926,567 | 1,043,938 |

=== Markets ===
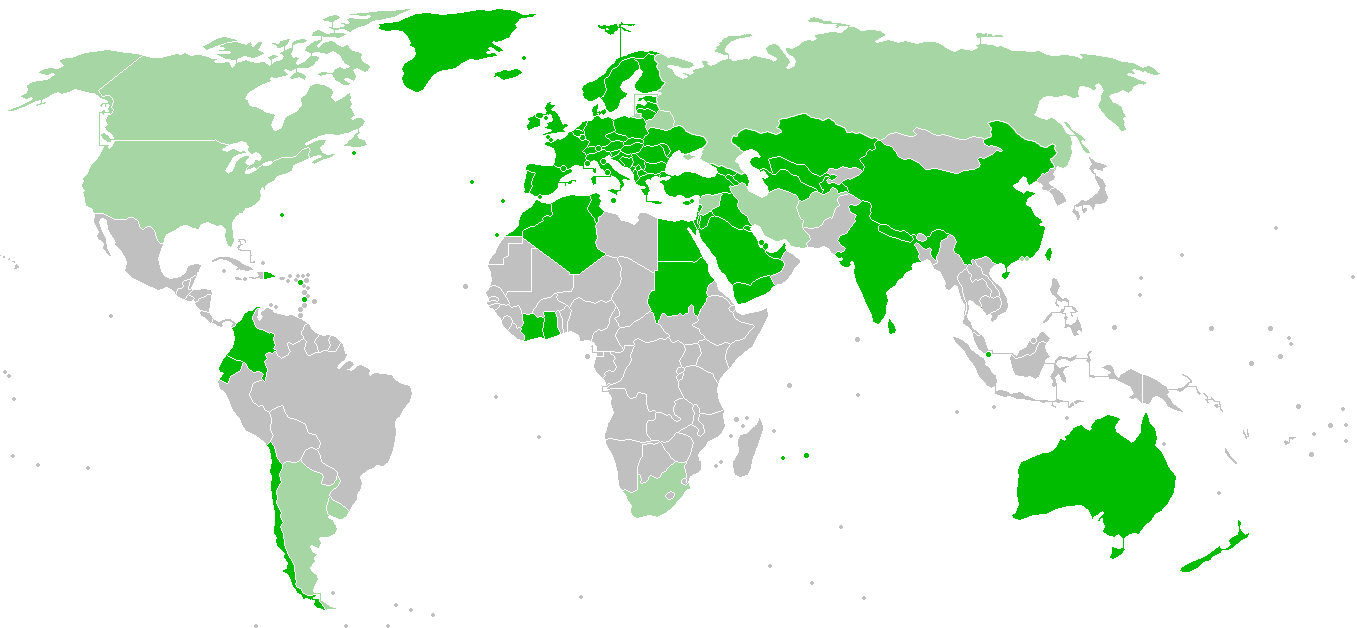
Worldwide sales of Škoda cars

As of August 2016, Škoda is being sold in 102 countries. In 2022, the top markets for Škoda by number of sales were Germany (134,260), Czech Republic (71,152), India (51,865), Great Britain (49,555) and Poland (44,985). In the Asia-Pacific region, Škoda is also being sold in Australia, New Zealand, Taiwan and Brunei. Škoda is also planning to expand into Iran, where imports are to be started from 2018 and production of vehicles by 2020. Expansion strategy also includes Singapore.

== Production ==
In 2025, Škoda produced 907,100 cars in the Czech Republic, 73,800 in India, 69,500 in Slovakia and 12,100 in China. Smaller numbers were assembled by local partners in Kazakhstan, Vietnam and Ukraine. Škoda operates two vehicle plants in Czech Republic; in Mladá Boleslav and in Kvasiny. A new assembly plant opened in 2025 in Quảng Ninh, producing the Kushaq and Slavia. Production of the Epiq began in Pamplona, in June 2026.

| Manufacturing plant | Vehicles and components | Operator |
|---|---|---|
| Mladá Boleslav (Czech Republic) | Fabia, Octavia, Kamiq, Scala, Enyaq, Enyaq Coupé, Elroq, Peaq; EA211 engines and battery packs | Škoda Auto a.s. |
| Kvasiny (Czech Republic) | Octavia, Kodiaq, Karoq | Škoda Auto a.s. |
| Vrchlabí (Czech Republic) | DQ200 seven-speed dual-clutch transmissions | Škoda Auto a.s. |
| Bratislava (Slovakia) | Superb | Volkswagen Slovakia |
| Pune (India) | Kushaq, Slavia, Kylaq | Škoda Auto Volkswagen India Pvt. Ltd. |
| Chhatrapati Sambhajinagar (formerly Aurangabad, India) | Kodiaq | Škoda Auto Volkswagen India Pvt. Ltd. |
| Quảng Ninh (Vietnam) | Kushaq, Slavia; assembly from completely knocked-down kits | Thanh Cong Group |
| Kostanay (Kazakhstan) | Octavia, Superb, Karoq, Kodiaq; assembly from semi-knocked-down kits | Allur |
| Solomonovo (Ukraine) | Karoq; assembly from semi-knocked-down kits | Eurocar |
| Pamplona (Spain) | Epiq (since June 2026) | Volkswagen Navarra |
| Changsha, Ningbo and Nanjing (China) | Octavia, Kamiq, Kamiq GT, Karoq, Kodiaq, Kodiaq GT, Superb (across the three plants) | SAIC Volkswagen |

=== Battery production ===
Škoda has assembled battery packs at Mladá Boleslav since 2019, initially for plug-in hybrids. Production of packs for fully electric cars followed in May 2022. The packs are used in Škoda cars and models sold by other Volkswagen Group brands. In February 2026, Škoda opened another battery assembly hall at the site. The hall cost €205 million and has capacity for up to 335,000 packs a year. It uses lithium iron phosphate (LFP) cells, assembled directly into packs without separate battery modules.

=== Suppliers ===
In 2025, Škoda worked with 2,119 production suppliers and spent €12 billion on materials and components. The Czech Republic accounted for the largest share of this spending, at 34.8%, followed by Germany with 11.6% and Poland with 11.2%.

Škoda’s supplier network in the Czech Republic includes Czech-owned and foreign-owned manufacturers. After investing in Škoda in 1991, Volkswagen encouraged existing Czech suppliers to form partnerships.

Czech-based suppliers also make components for Škoda’s electric vehicles. For the Elroq, Brano supplies bonnet hinges and tailgate mechanisms, Retex supplies carpets and acoustic insulation, and Tawesco produces steel body components.

== Motorsport ==
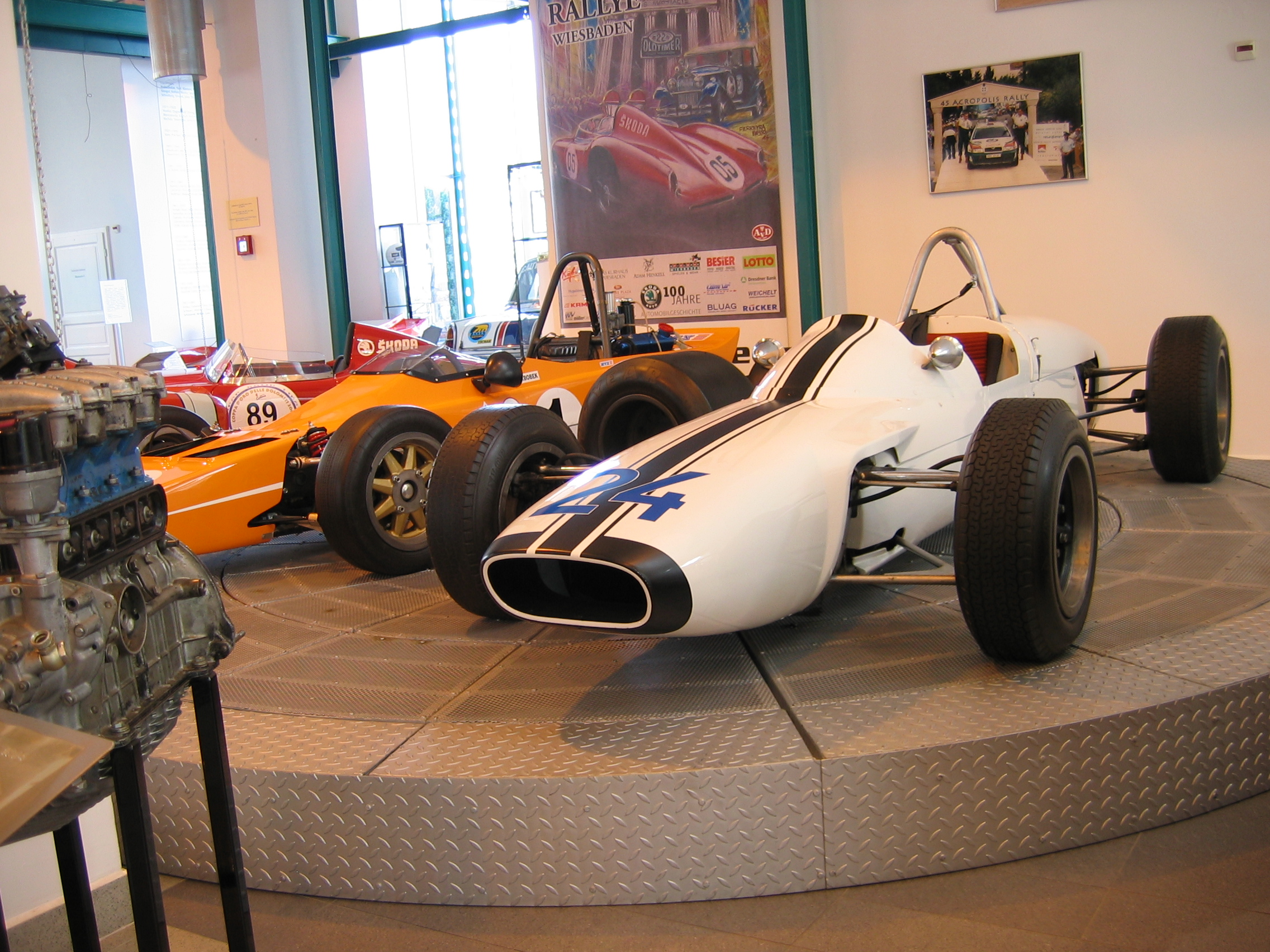
Various models of the Škoda F3 in the Škoda Museum

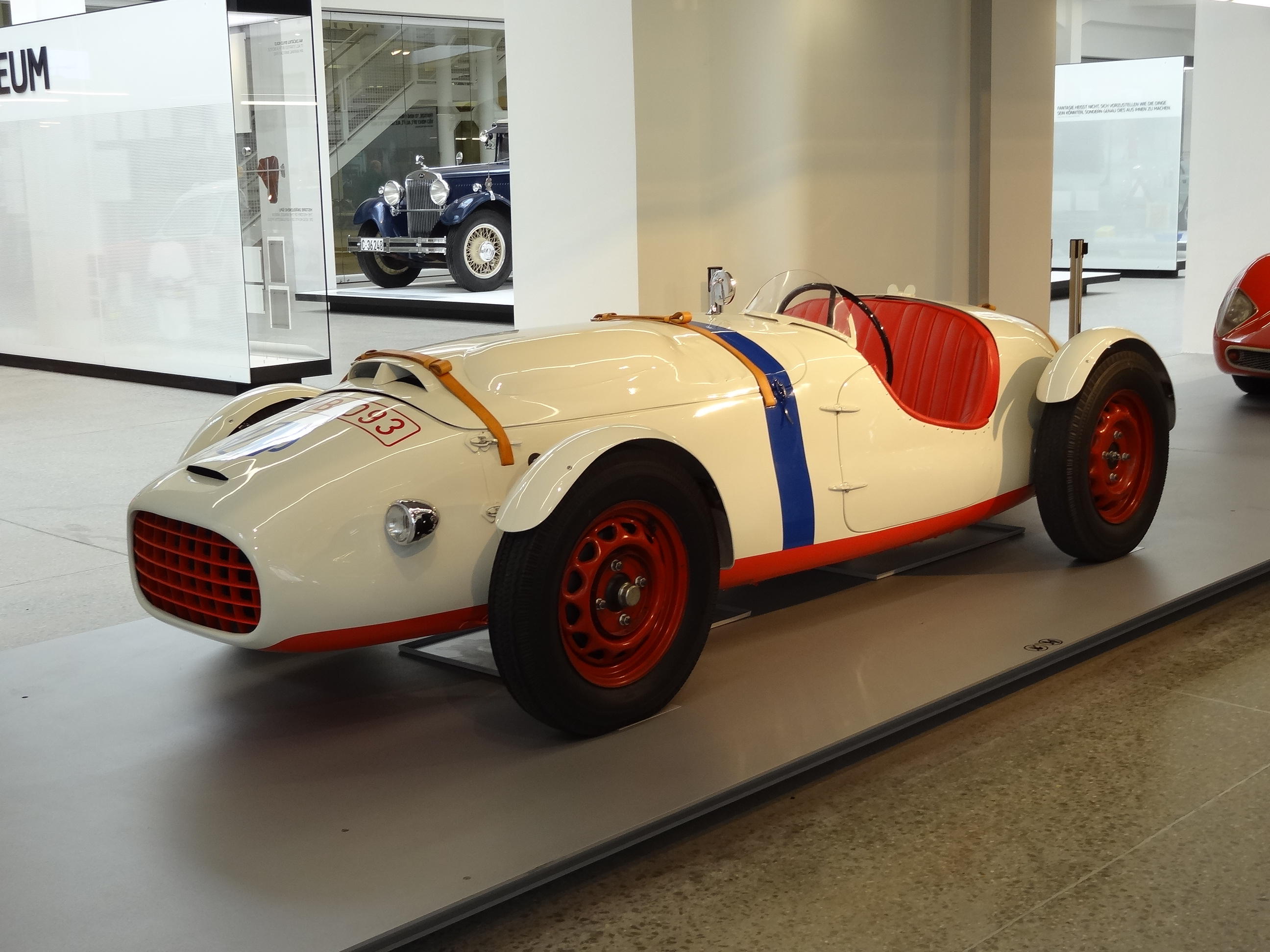
1950 Škoda 966 Supersport in the Škoda Museum

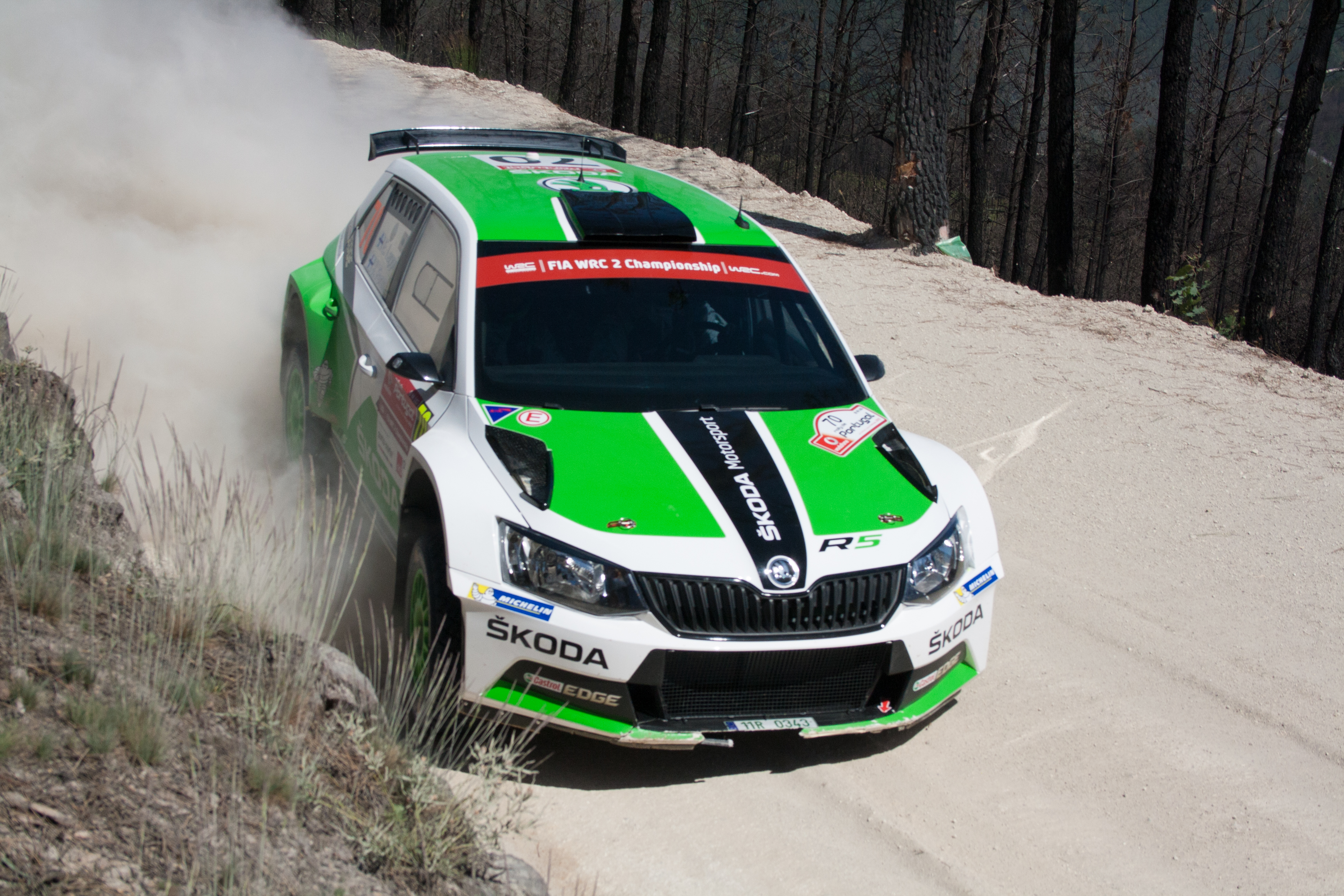
With the Škoda Fabia R5, Škoda Motorsport won the 2015, 2016, 2017 and 2018 World Rally Championship-2, which focuses on production-based cars

The Škoda brand has been engaged in motor sport since 1901, and has gained several titles with various vehicles around the world. The team had competed as a manufacturer in the Intercontinental Rally Challenge (before it merged with ERC in 2013) and World Rally Championship between 1999 and 2005. Now it competes in the European Rally Championship and WRC-2.

Until the final season of IRC in 2012, Škoda Motorsport was the most successful manufacturer with a total of 27 points, winning the rallying series in 2010–2012. Since 2013, when the two competing series were merged, it has continued to compete in the European Rally Championship.

Škoda Motorsport drivers won with the Škoda Fabia S2000 the European Rally Championships in 2012–2014.

=== World Rally Championship ===
After a long history of class victories in lower levels of motorsport, Škoda became a participant in the FIA World Rally Championship in the 1999 season, with World Rally Car models of the Škoda Octavia. Škoda's best result with the Octavia WRC was Armin Schwarz's third place at the 2001 Safari Rally. From mid 2003, the Octavia was replaced by the smaller Škoda Fabia. Škoda used the 2004 season to develop the car further, but did not achieve much success in the following season. However, at the season-ending Rally Australia, 1995 world champion Colin McRae was running second before retiring. Škoda then withdrew from the series, and the 2006 season saw Škoda represented by the semi-privateer Red Bull Škoda Team. Jan Kopecký drove the Fabia WRC to fifth place at the Rally Catalunya, and as late as the 2007 Rallye Deutschland the Fabia still achieved a fifth-place result, again in the hands of Kopecký. Former works Ford and Citroen driver François Duval also drove a Fabia WRC in 2006 for the privateer First Motorsport team, achieving a sixth-place finish in Catalunya.

=== WRC2 ===
In 2009, Škoda entered the Intercontinental Rally Challenge (IRC) for the first time, using the Fabia S2000, winning three rallies and finishing second in both the drivers and manufacturers' championships. In 2010, Škoda won a total of seven IRC events, winning both the manufacturers' and driver championships for Juho Hänninen. These achievements were repeated in the following two seasons, with Andreas Mikkelsen as the driver's champion. In 2013, the Intercontinental Rally Challenge was merged with the European Rally Championship (ERC), and the team gained the drivers' championship title once again for Jan Kopecký. The car was also raced by privateers in several championships, including Red Bull, Barwa, Rene Georges, and Rufa in the 2010 Super 2000 World Rally Championship.

Škoda Motorsport won the 2015, 2016, 2017 and 2018 WRC-2 championships with Škoda Fabia R5.

=== Bonneville Speedway ===
In August 2011, a special Škoda Octavia vRS set a world record at the Bonneville Speedway and became the fastest production car in the world with an engine up to two litres, when it hit 227 mph (365 km/h). The current fastest production Škoda car is the Škoda Superb III, with a top speed of 250 km/h (160 mph) and an acceleration from 0 to 100 km/h (0 to 62 mph) in 5.8 seconds.

== Current models ==
- Škoda Enyaq – all-electric crossover SUV (since 2020)
- Škoda Elroq – all-electric crossover SUV (since 2025)
- Škoda Epiq – all-electric crossover SUV (since 2026)
- Škoda Peaq – all-electric crossover SUV (since 2026)
- Škoda Kodiaq II – SUV (since 2023)
- Škoda Karoq – compact SUV (since 2017)
- Škoda Kamiq – crossover SUV (since 2019)
- Škoda Kushaq – crossover SUV (since 2021)
- Škoda Kylaq – subcompact crossover SUV - (since 2024)
- Škoda Superb IV – compact executive car (since 2023)
- Škoda Octavia IV – small family car (since 2019)
- Škoda Slavia – subcompact car (since 2022)
- Škoda Scala – small family car (since 2019)
- Škoda Fabia IV – supermini (since 2021)
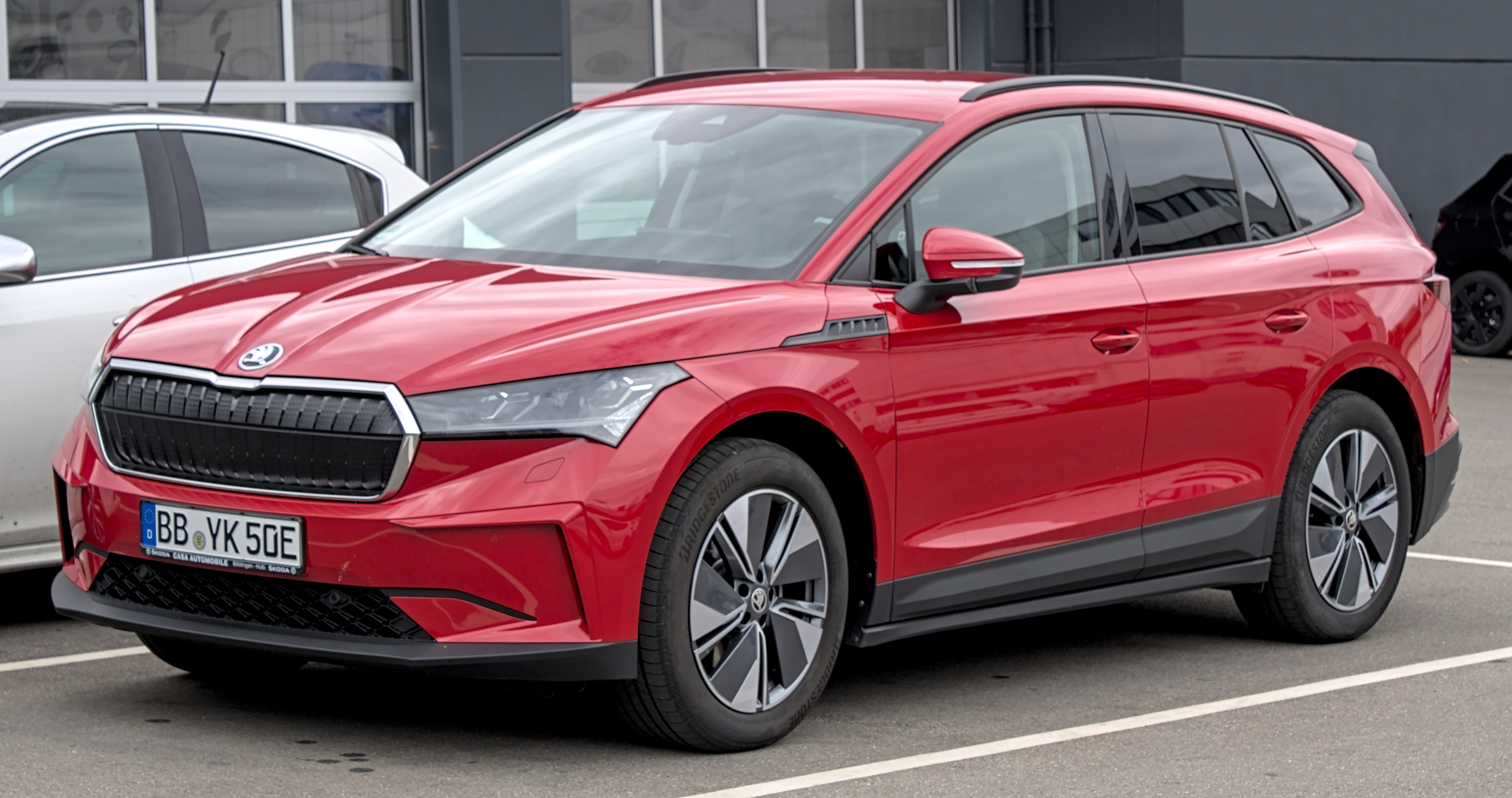
Škoda Enyaq (since 2020)

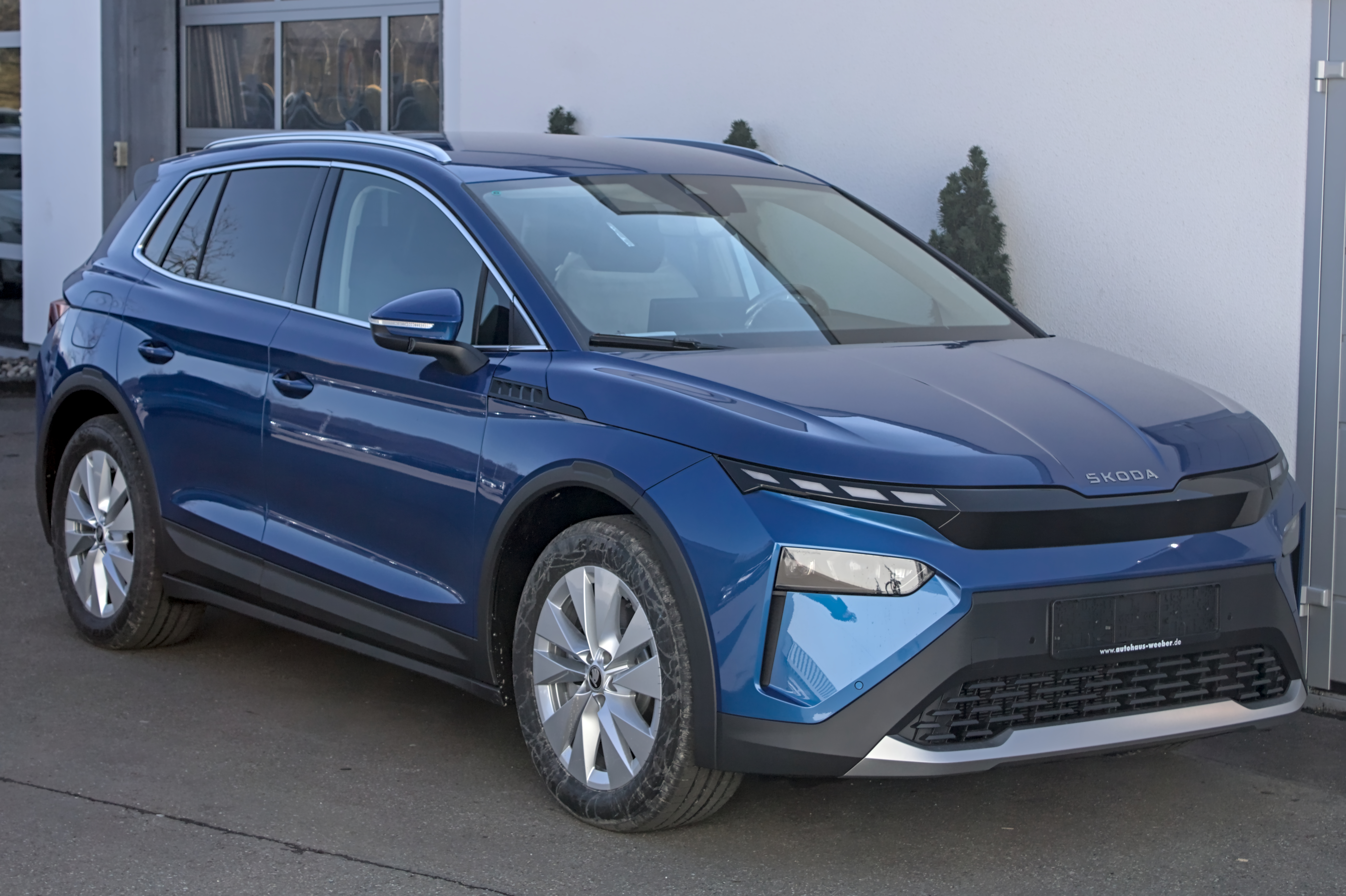
Škoda Elroq (since 2025)

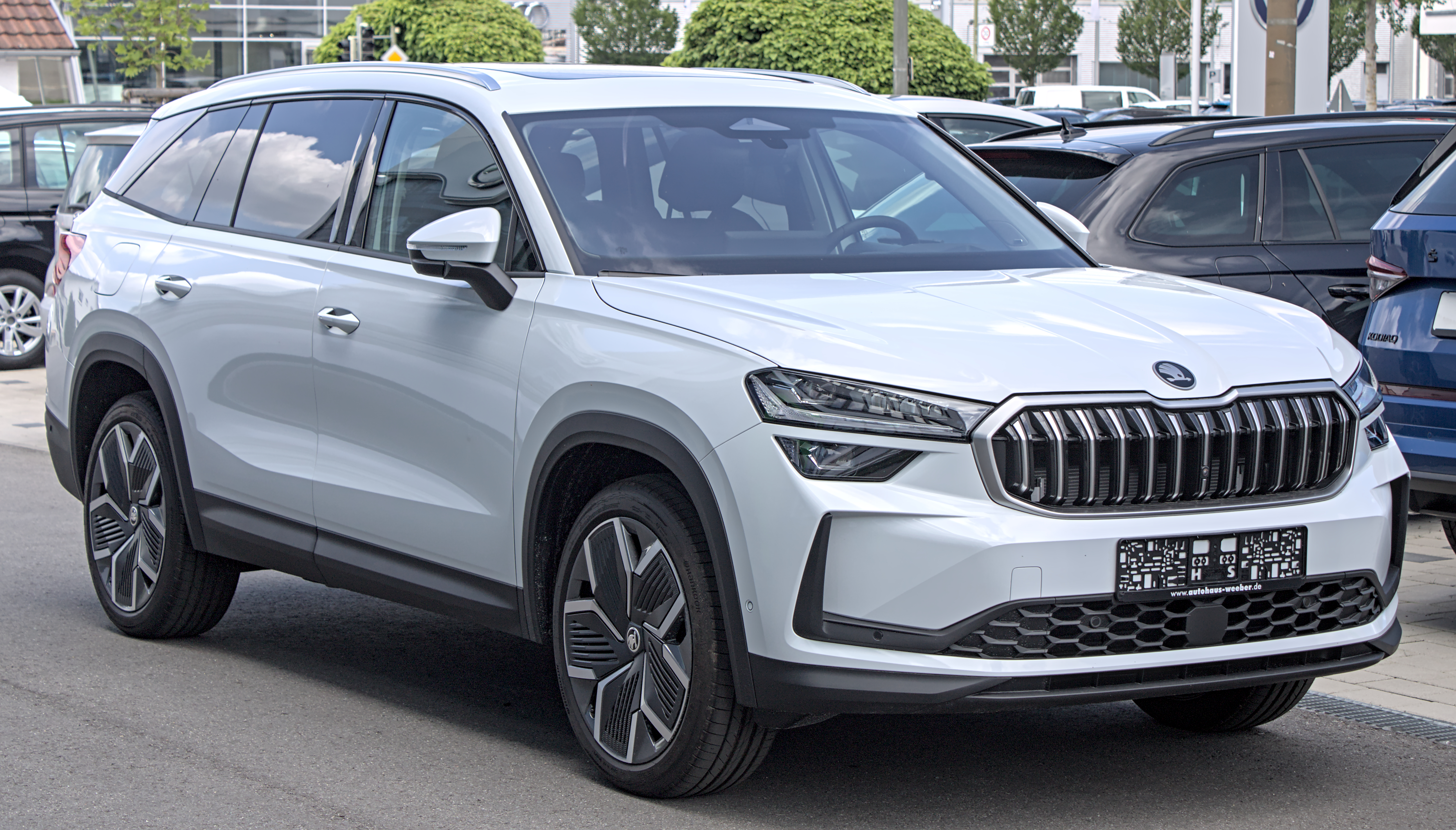
Škoda Kodiaq II (since 2024)

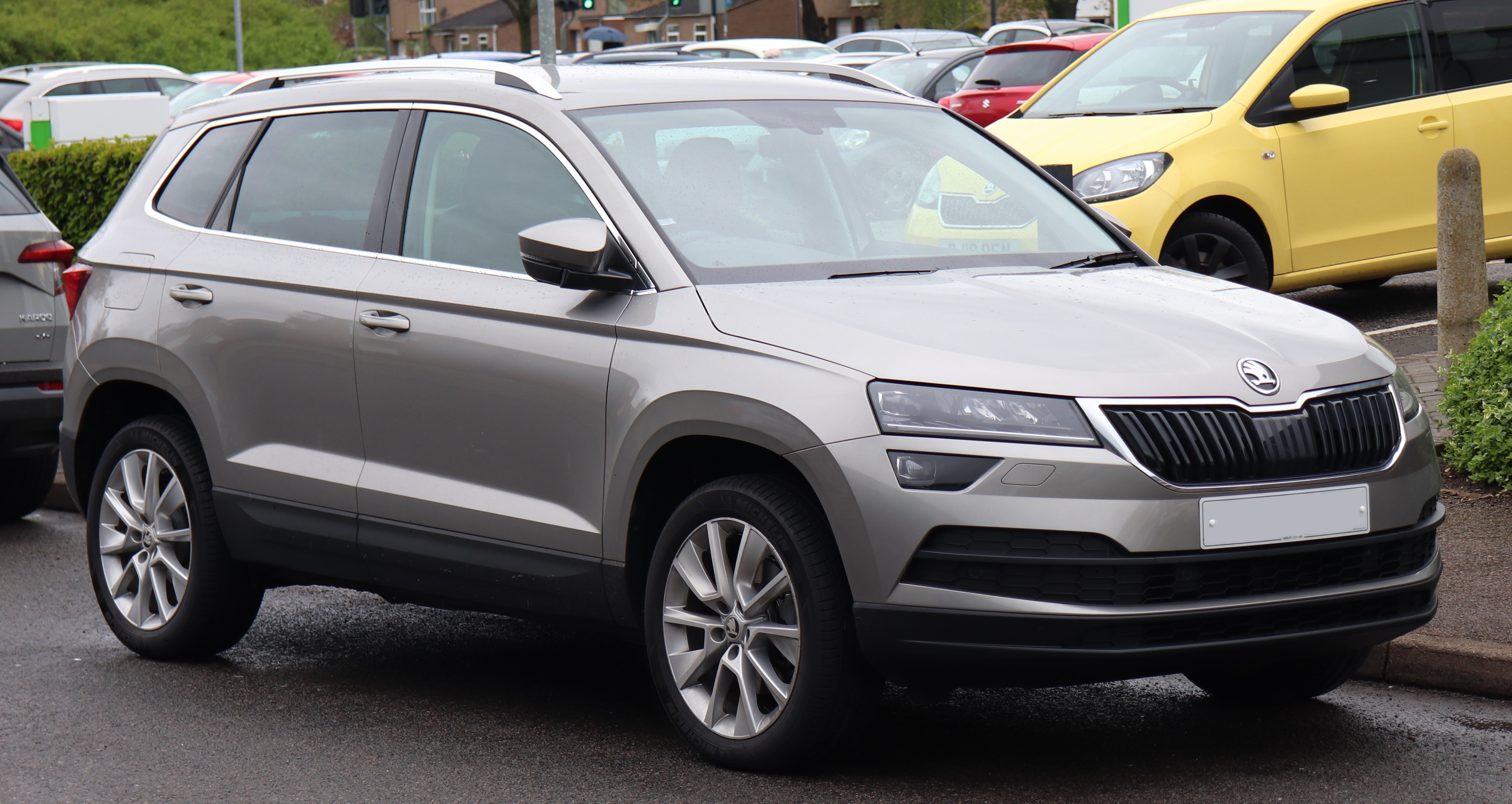
Škoda Karoq (since 2017)

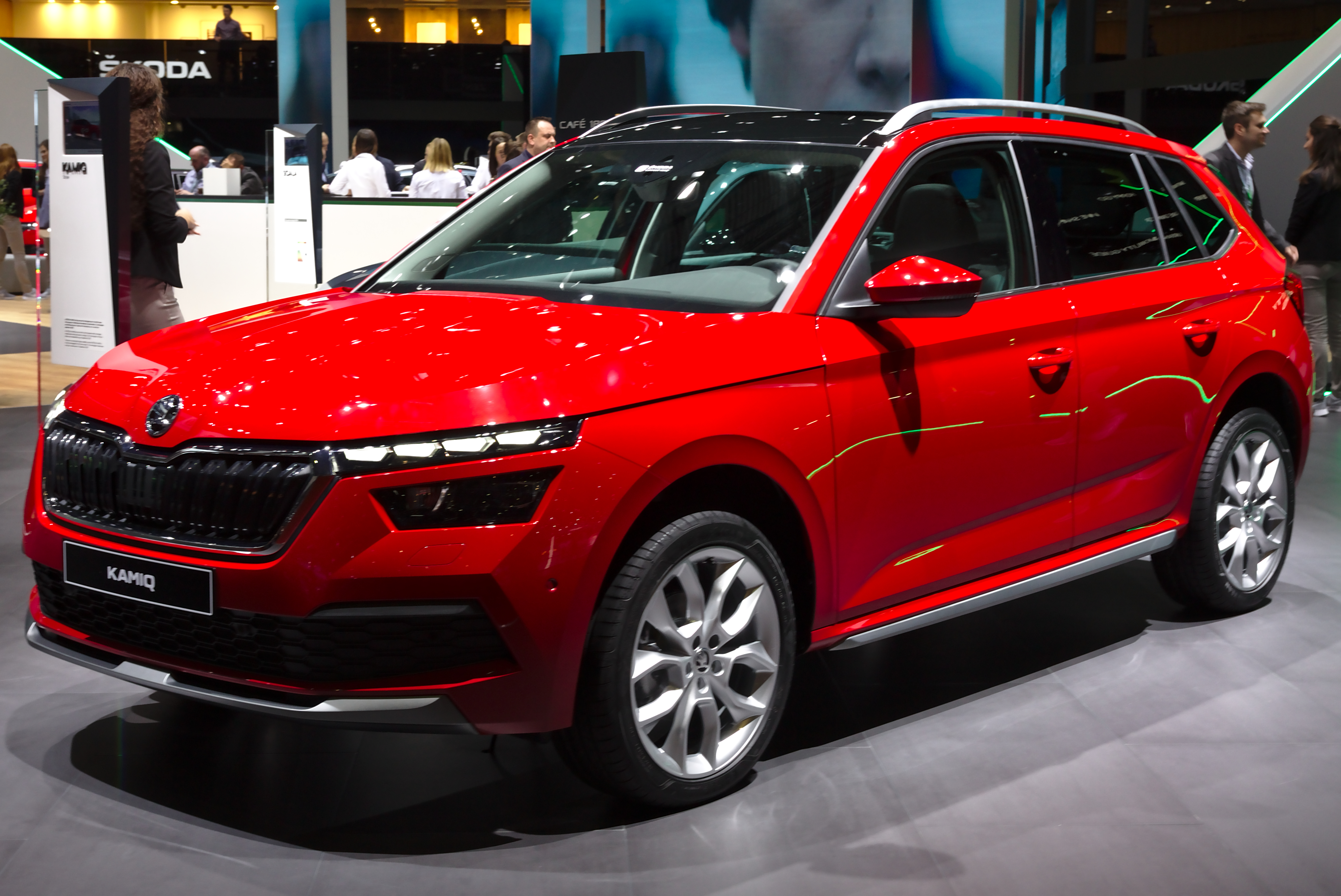
Škoda Kamiq (since 2019)

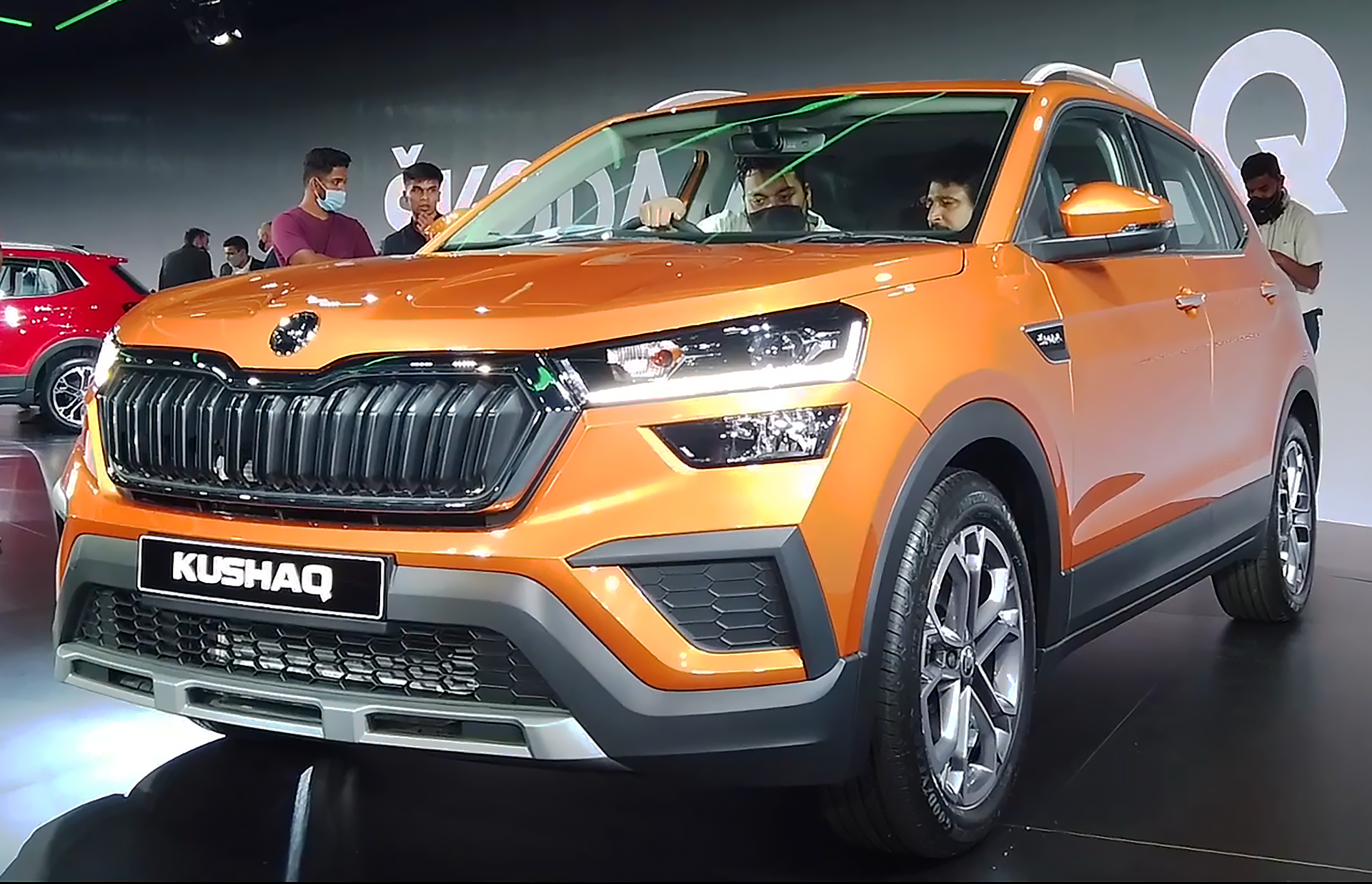
Škoda Kushaq (since 2021)

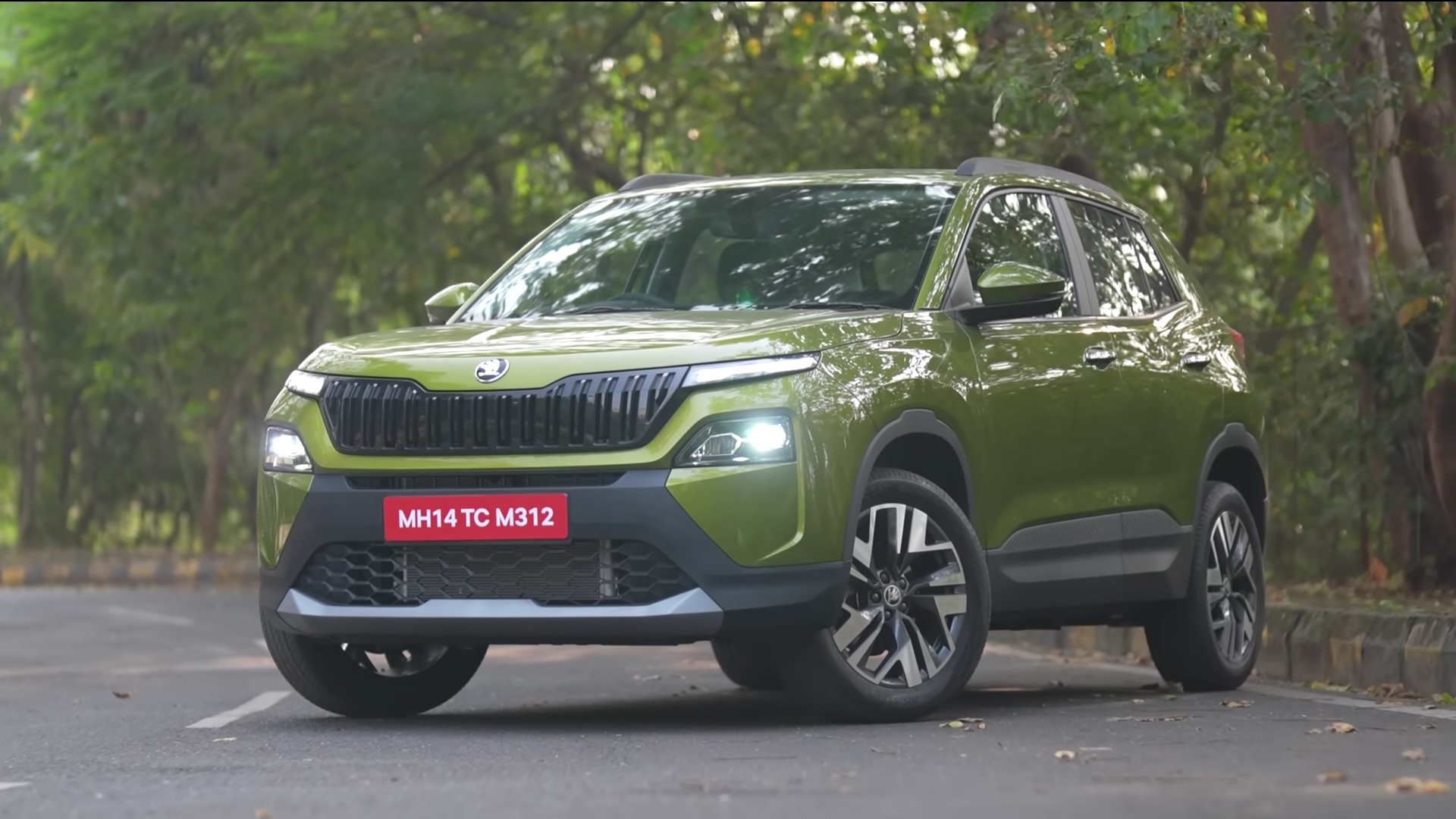
Škoda Kylaq (since 2024)

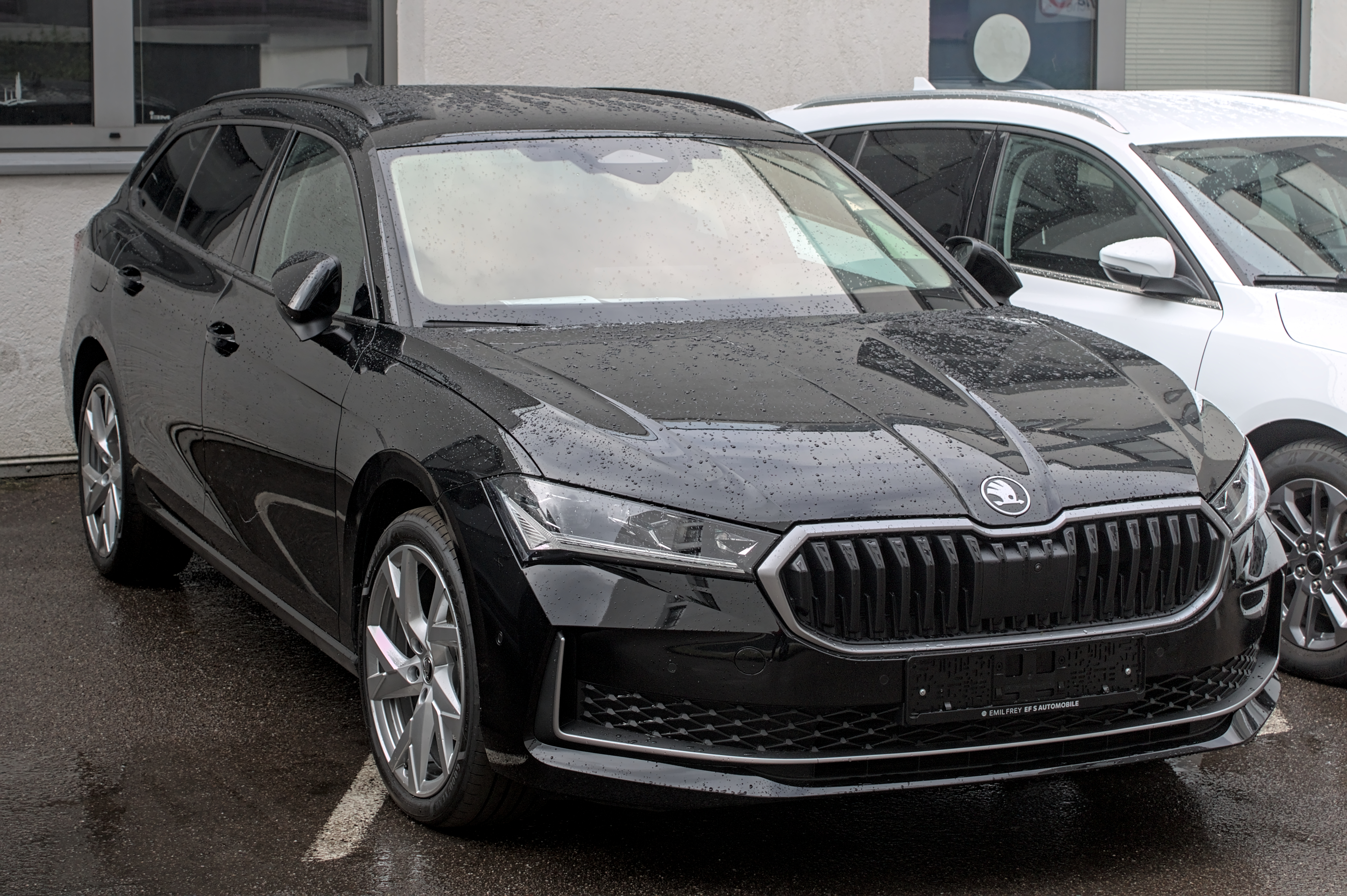
Škoda Superb IV (since 2023)

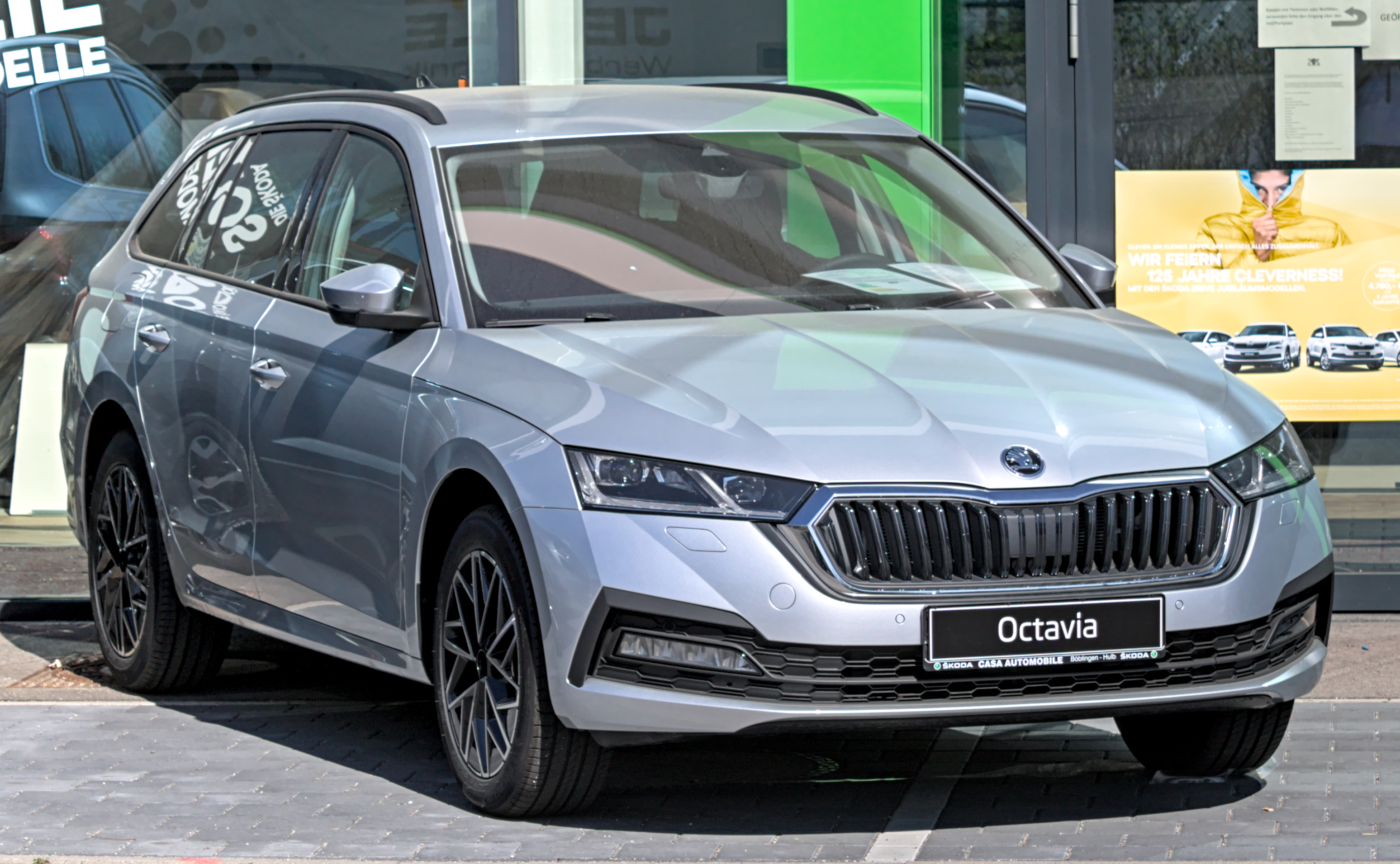
Škoda Octavia IV (since 2019)

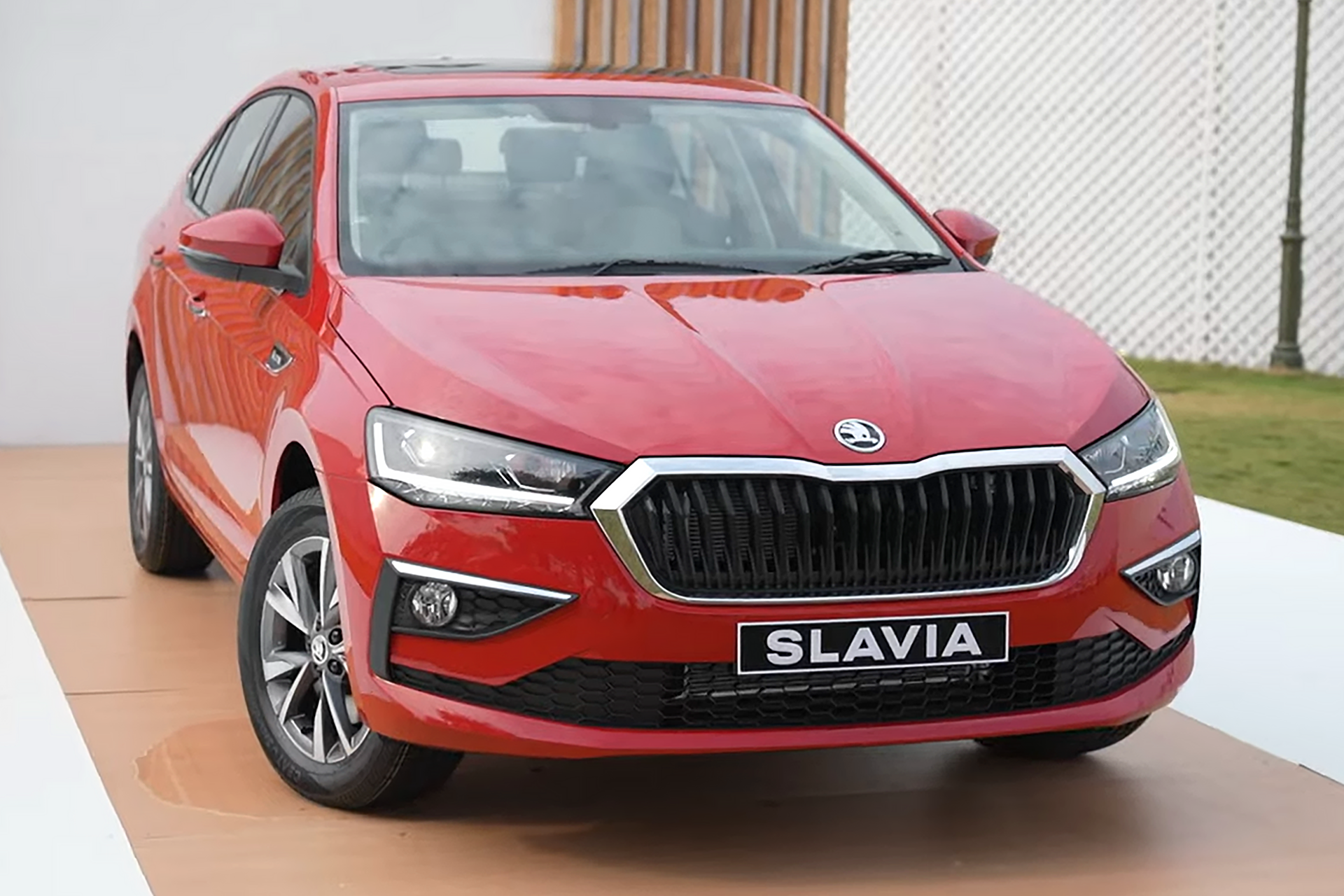
Škoda Slavia (since 2022)

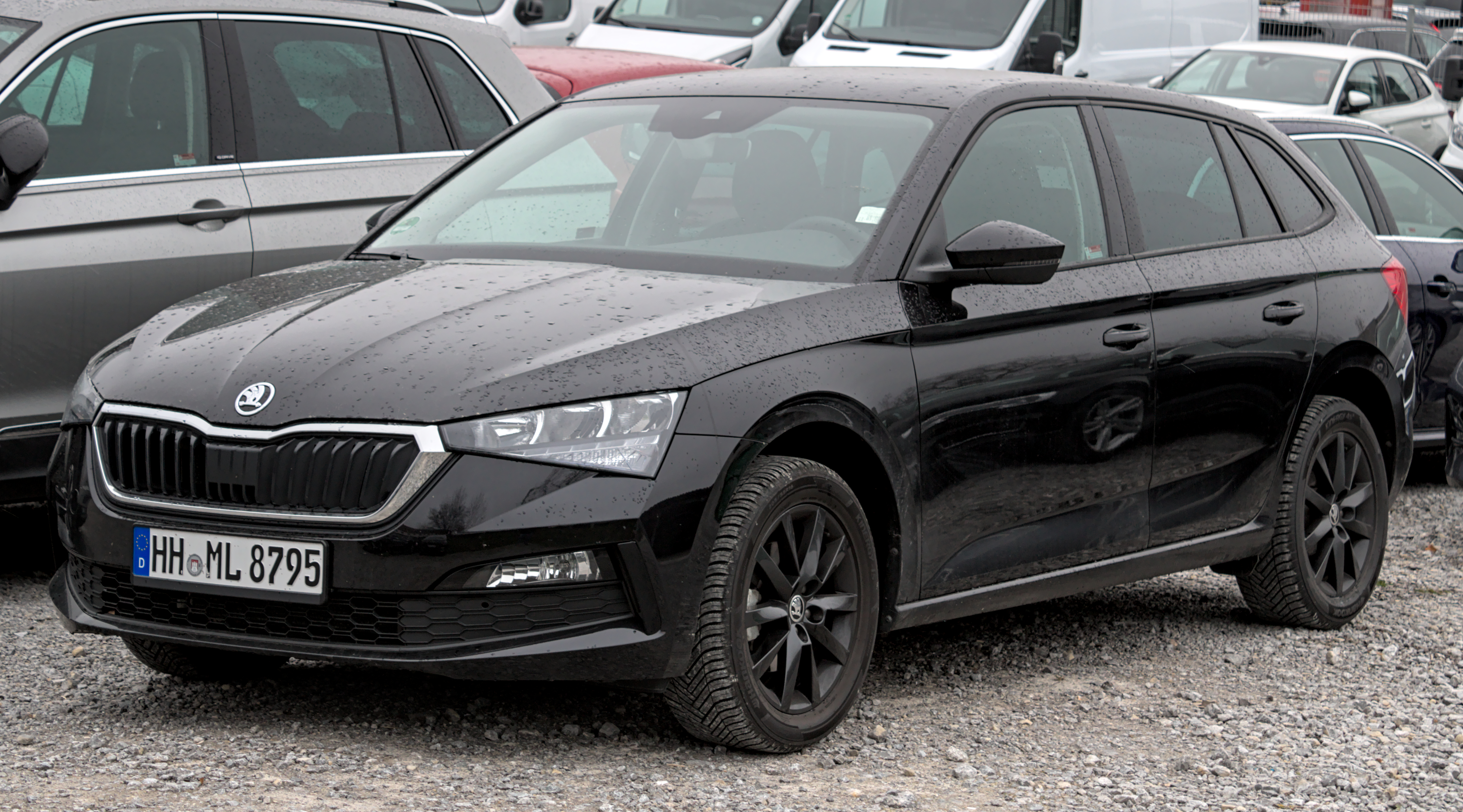
Škoda Scala (since 2019)

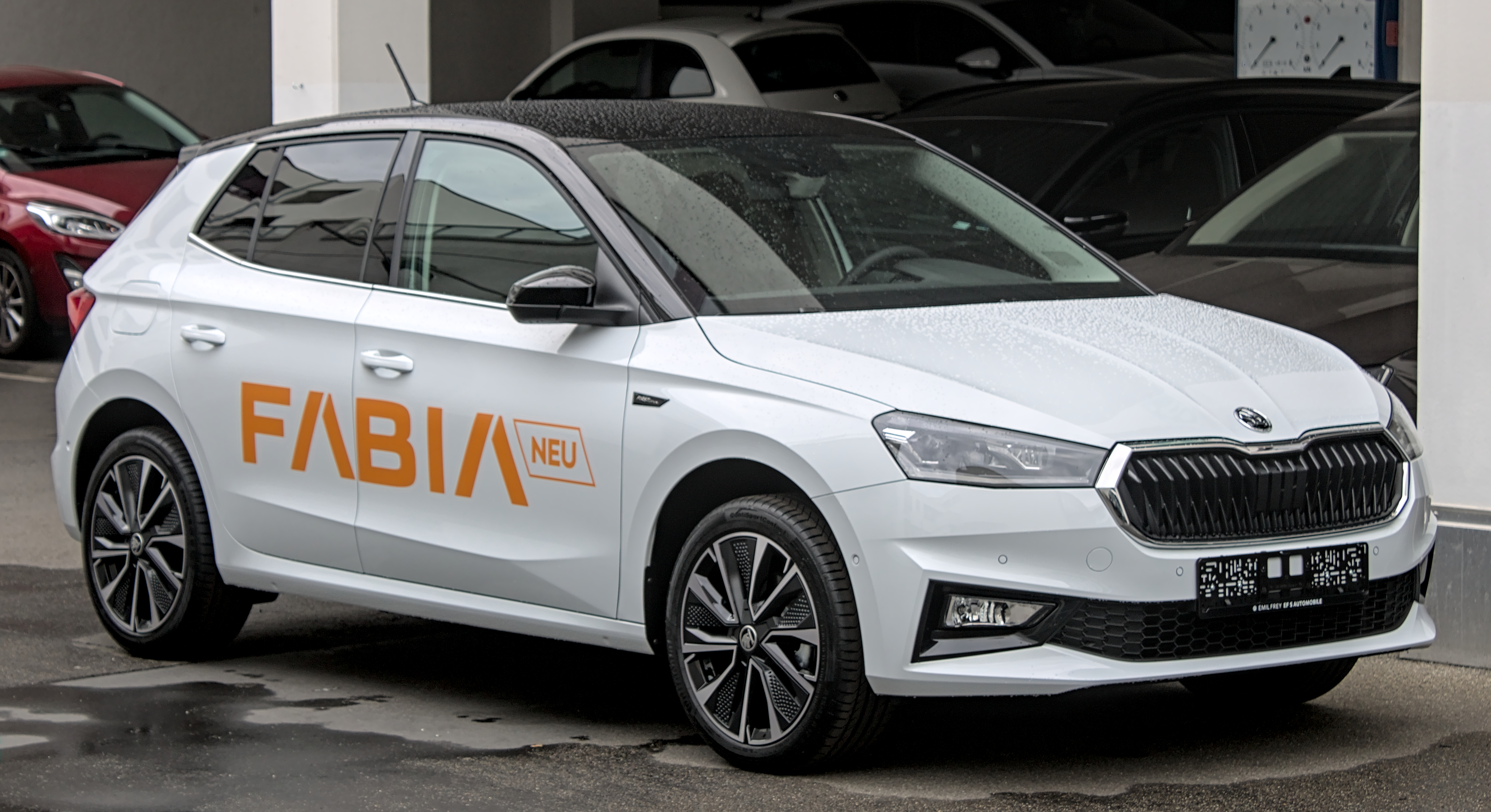
Škoda Fabia IV (since 2021)

== Logo ==
In 1923, two different trademarks were registered at the Office for Innovation and Model Registration in Plzeň. The first depicted a winged arrow pointing to the right with five feathers in a circle and the second was a winged arrow with three feathers. The famous winged arrow with three feathers still forms the Škoda logo today. The ŠKODA text was added to the logo in 1936. The arrow represents speed, the wings progress and freedom, the eye precision, and the circle unity, completeness, world, and harmony. The story goes that, on his travels through the US, Emil Škoda had once been so taken with a Native American's feathered headdress that he had returned to Plzeň with a relief image which inspired the logo.

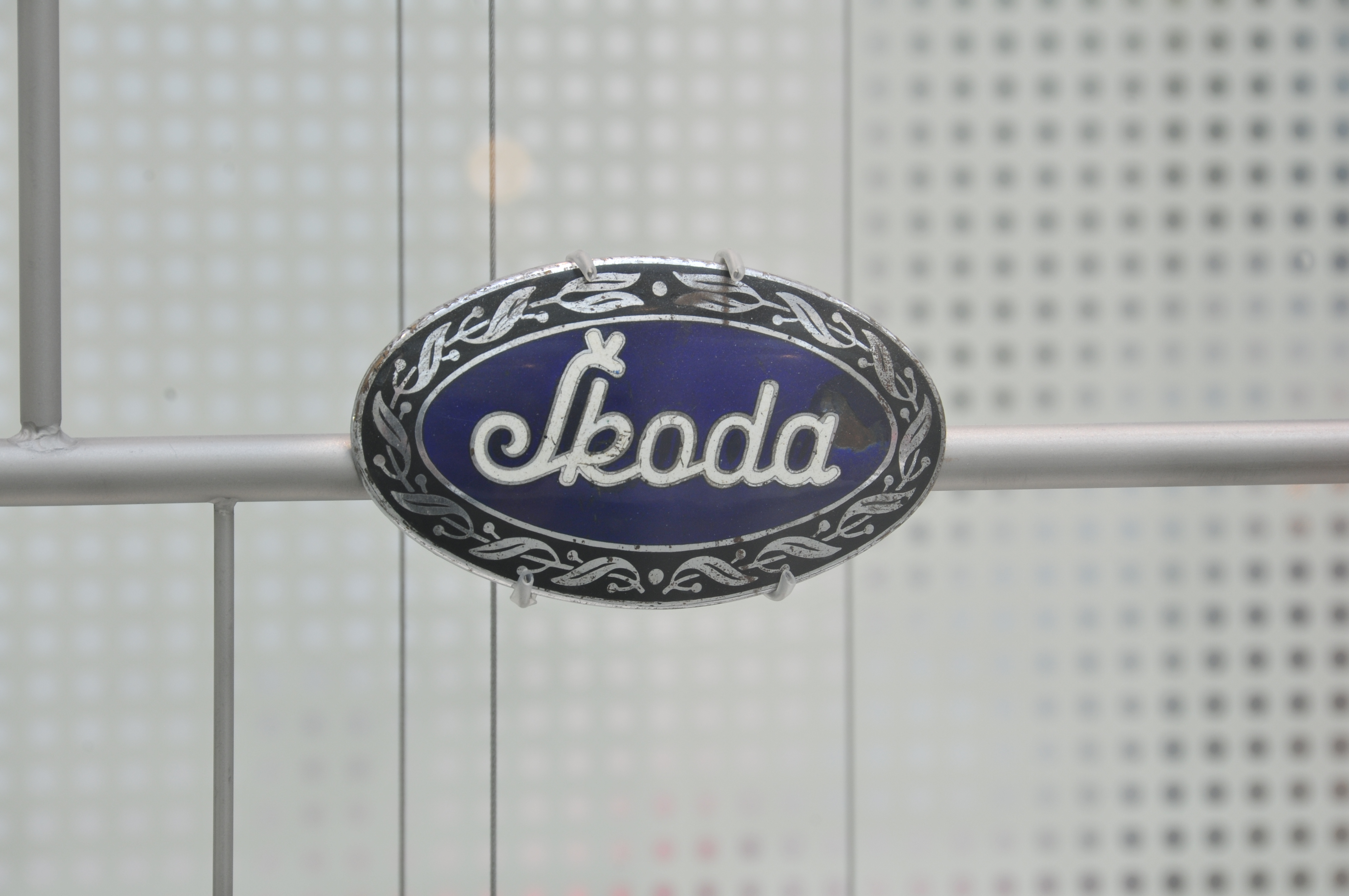
1925–1934

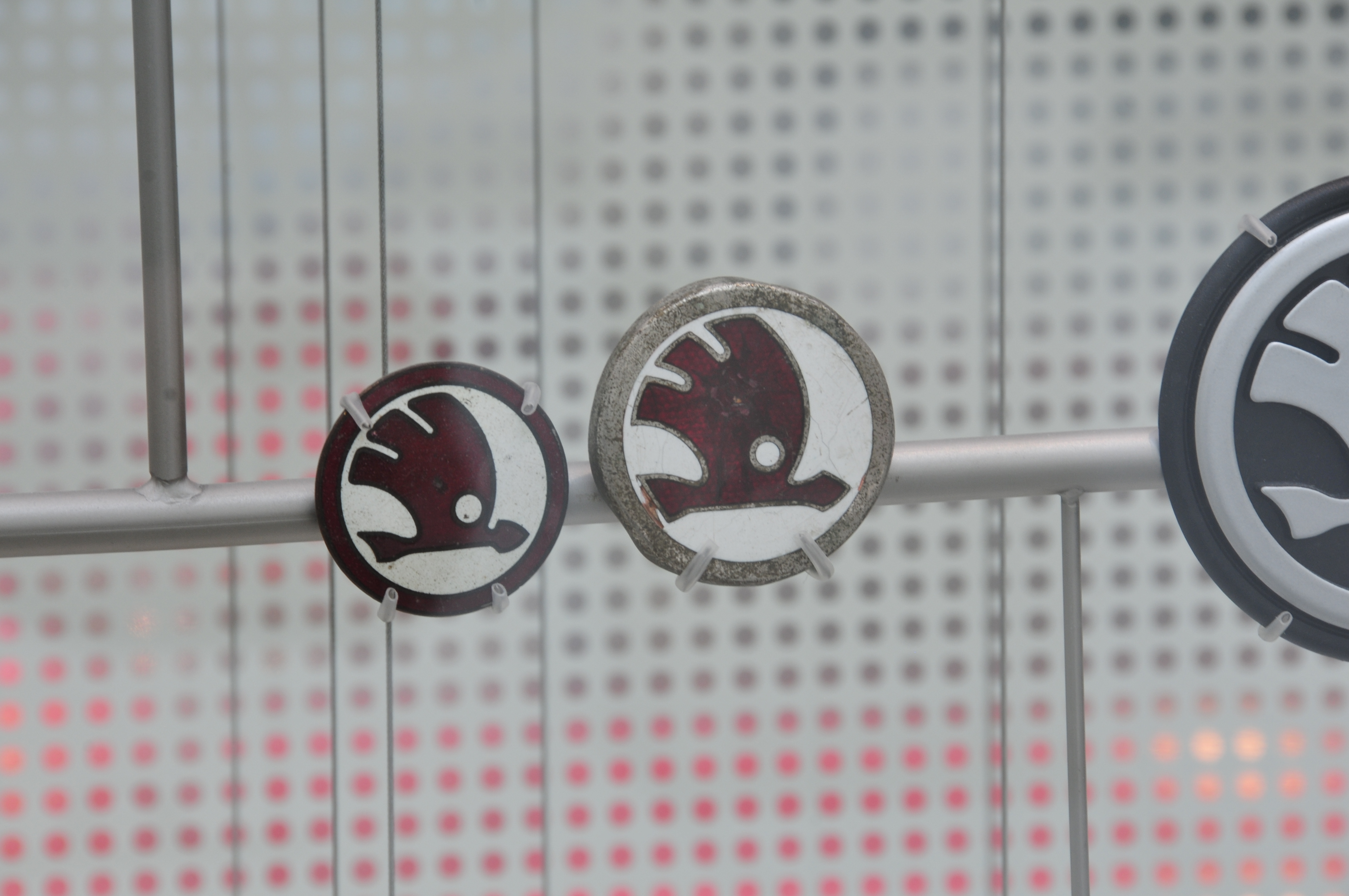
1926–1993 (blue also offered)

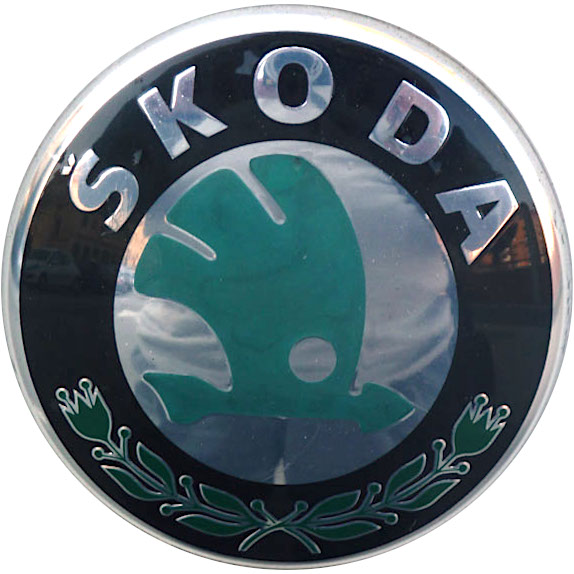
1986–1990

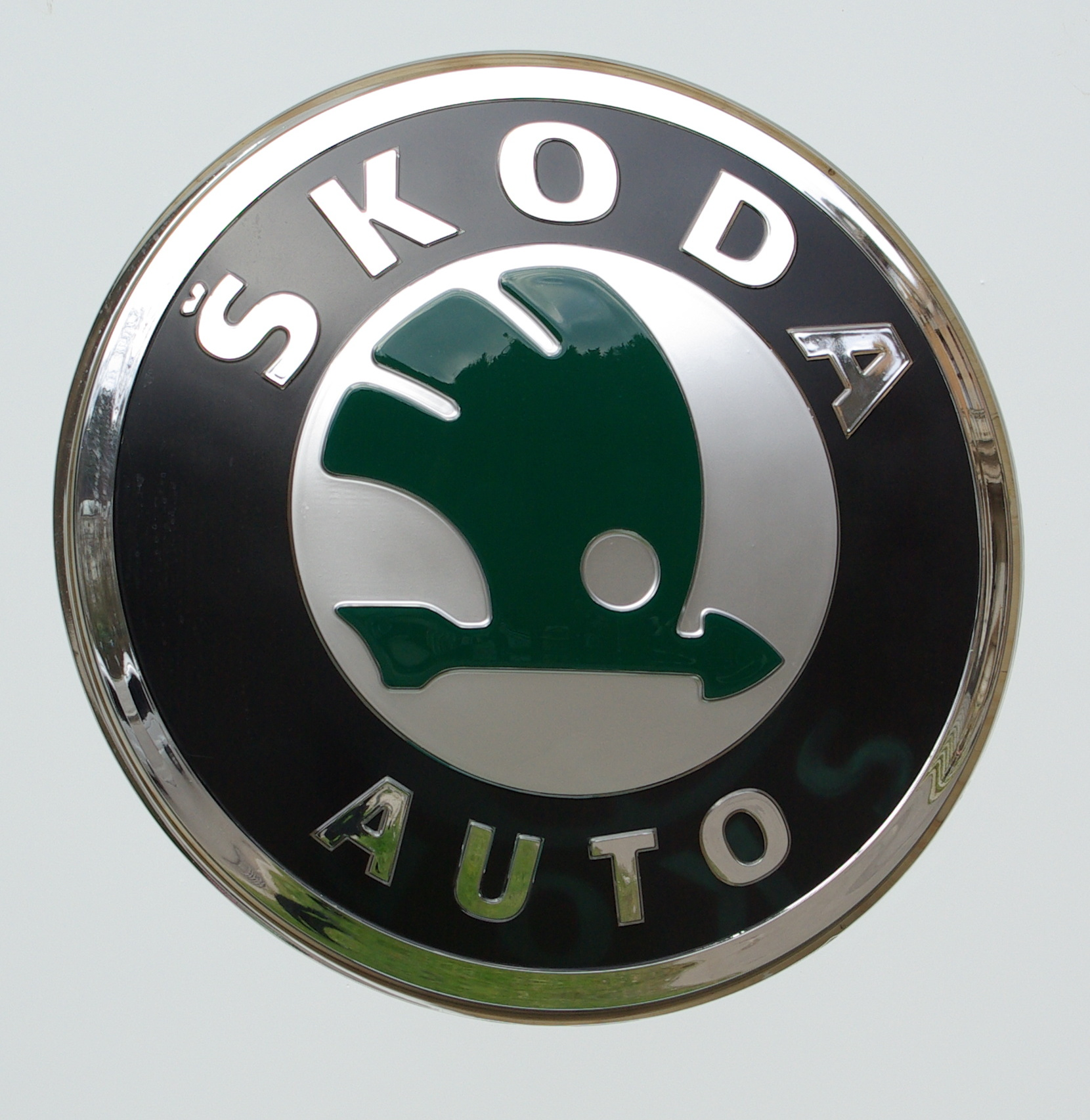
1991–2010

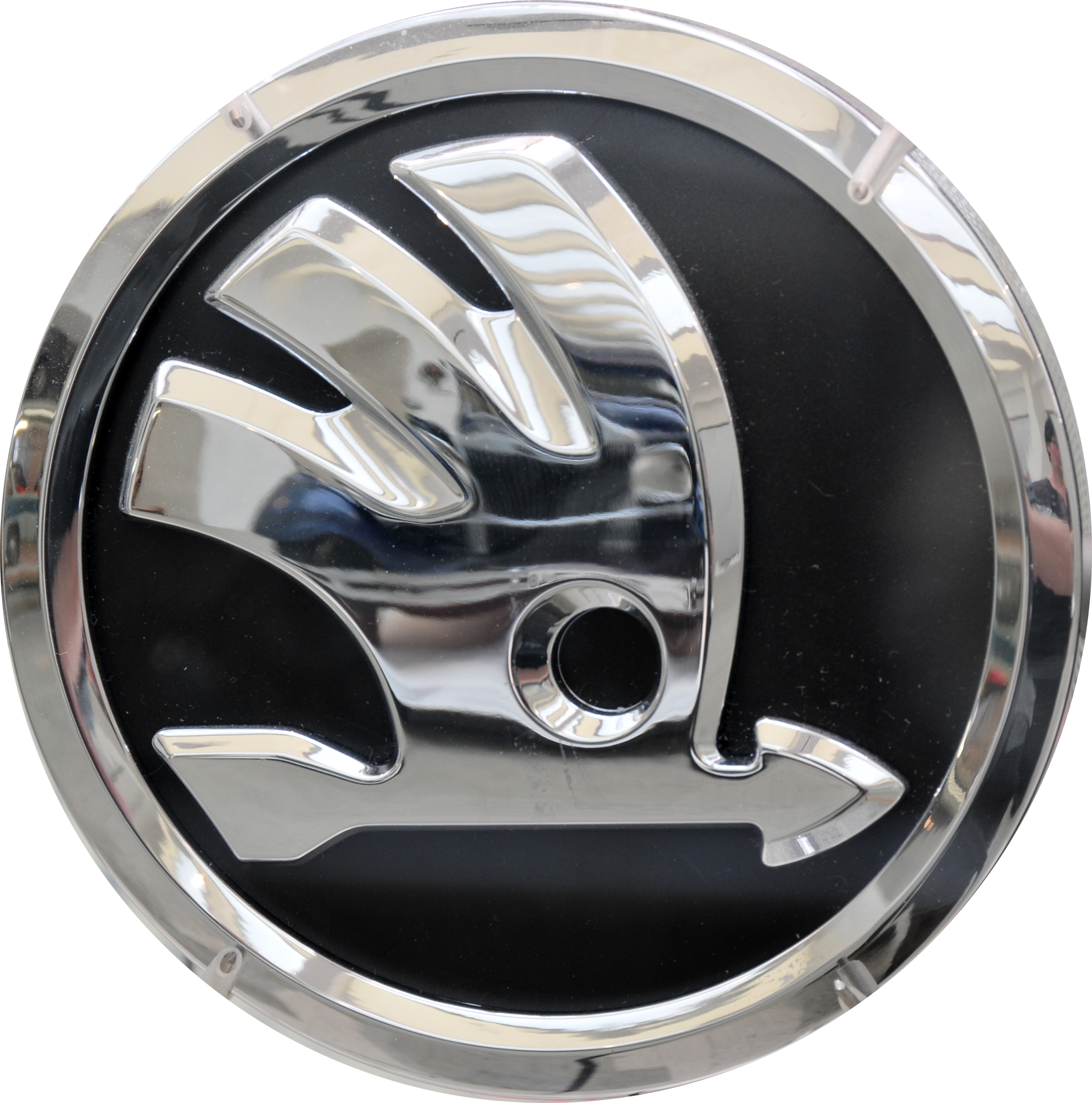
2011–2023

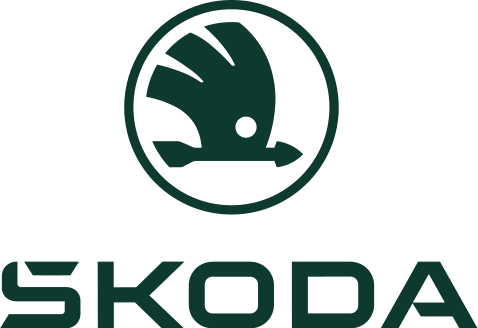
2023–present

== See also ==
- List of automobile manufacturers of the Czech Republic
- Škoda Works
- Avia
- Tatra
- Praga

== General and cited references ==
- Margolius, Ivan & Meisl, Charles (1992). Škoda Laurin & Klement. London: Osprey. ISBN 1-85532-237-4.
- Jetschgo, Johannes (2019). Škoda: A Car That Made History. Prague: Vitalis. ISBN 978-3-89919-652-8
