= Škoda 637 =

Overview
- Manufacturer: ASAP, subsidiary of Škoda Works
- Production: 1932–1935
- Assembly: Mladá Boleslav, Czechoslovakia

Body and chassis
- Body style: Sedan, limousine
- Chassis: Type 637: ladder frame (1933); Types 637D, 637K: backbone chassis

Powertrain
- Engine: Six-cylinder 1961 cc SV; Type 637: 37 hp (28 kW); Types 637D, 637K: 45 hp (34 kW)
- Transmission: Single-plate clutch 4-speed gearbox

Chronology
- Predecessor: Škoda 633 (1931)
- Successor: Škoda Superb (1934); Škoda Favorit (1936)

The Škoda 637 is a Czechoslovak mid-size car that was made by Škoda from 1932 to 1935.

The car has a 1961 cc, six-cylinder, sidevalve engine, which is an enlarged version of the 1792 cc engine introduced in the Škoda 633 in 1931. Transmission is via a single-plate clutch and four-speed gearbox with synchronised third and fourth gears.

The wheels are pressed steel, with drum brakes. The electrical system runs on 12 volts. The body has pressed steel panels on an ash frame.

== Type 637 ==
The original 1932 version of the Type 637 was built on a ladder frame. Its 1961 cc engine produced 37 hp (28 kW).

In 1933 a trio of Type 637 cars won second, third and fourth place in the two-litre class of the Czechoslovak 1,000-mile race. In 1934 a Type 637 again won second place.

But economic conditions were poor in the early 1930s, and Škoda sales were small. Only 11 were built.

== Types 637D and 637K ==
Škoda developed a new backbone chassis based on the successful Tatra concept. This had more torsional stiffness. The first Škoda to have a backbone chassis was the 420 Standard introduced in 1933. In 1934 Škoda applied a larger version of the same chassis to the Type 637.

At the same time Škoda increased the power of the Type 637 engine to 45 hp (34 kW), giving it a top speed of 110 km/h (68 mph). The improved model was designated Type 637D. Body options offered included a two-door or four-door sedan and a six-seat, "six-light" limousine with sunroof. Sales improved slightly, numbering 39 cars.

Škoda revised the model again as the 637K. Sales remained low, with only 17 examples of this version being built. Production ceased in 1935.

== Successors ==
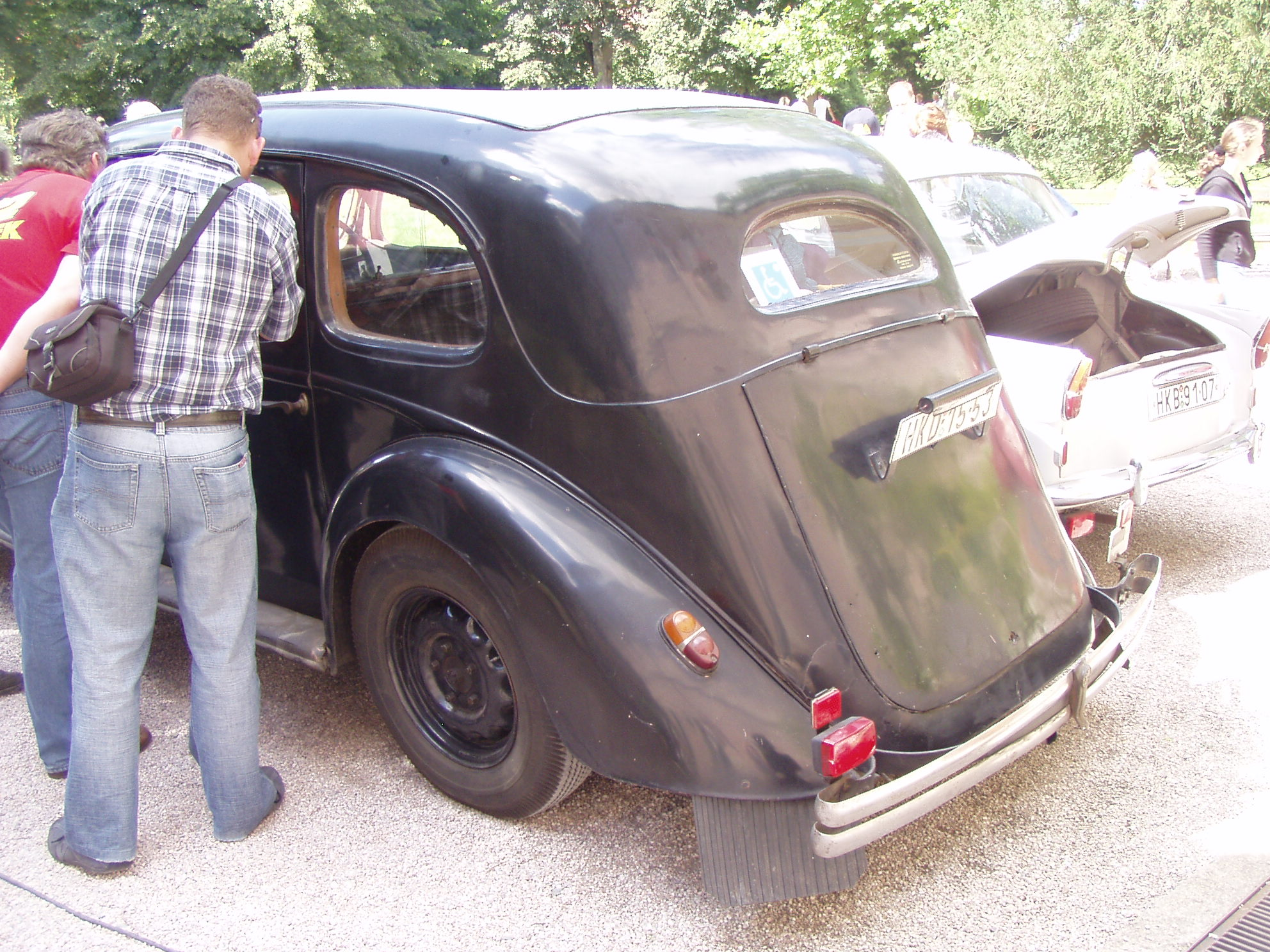
637 rear

A Type 637 with its engine enlarged to 2492 cc and its chassis lengthened became the prototype Škoda Type 640. The model was launched on 22 October 1934 as the Škoda Superb.

In 1936 Škoda tried to return to the Type 637's segment of the mid-range market with the four-cylinder Škoda Favorit. This model also suffered from poor sales, and production ceased in 1941.

== Sources ==
- Tuček, Jan (2017). Auta první republiky 1918–1938 (in Czech). Prague: Grada Publishing. pp. 139–147. ISBN 978-80-271-0466-6.
