= 637 (disambiguation) =

637 or 637th, may refer to:

- 637 is a number in the 600s range

== Dates ==
- AD 637 is a year in the Common Era (CE) during the first millennium
- 637 BC is a year Before the Common Era (BCE) during its first millennium

== Places ==
- 637 Chrysothemis, the asteroid Chrysothemis, asteroid #637, the 637th asteroid registered, a main-belt asteroid
- Cartier No. 637, Alberta, Canada; municipality #647
- Highway 637, routes numbered 637

== Groups and organizations ==
- Joint Task Force 637, a 2011 group for organizing flood relief in Queensland by the Australian Armed Forces
- No. 637 Gliding School RAF, British air force
- No. 637 Volunteer Gliding Squadron RAF, British air force
- 637th Air Defense Group, U.S. Air Force
- 637th Aero Supply Squadron, a WWI U.S. Army Air Corps squadron serving in France
- 637th Bombardment Squadron, a WWII U.S. Army Air Force squadron
- 637th Radar Squadron, a Cold War U.S. Air Force squadron
- 637th Heavy Anti-Aircraft Regiment, Royal Artillery (3rd Bn The Monmouthshire Regiment), British Army
- 637th (The Northamptonshire Regiment) Infantry Regiment, Royal Artillery, British Army

== Vehicles ==
- USS Bowers (DE-637), a U.S. Navy World War II Buckley-class destroyer escort
- USS Gerhardi (DD-637), a U.S. Navy World War II Greaves-class destroyer
- French destroyer Jauréguiberry (D637), a post-World War II T53-class destroyer of France
- USS Sturgeon (SSN-637), a U.S. Navy attack submarine
- German submarine U-637, a German World War II submarine
- Sturgeon-class submarine, a U.S. Navy submarine class, the 637 class
- Type 637 tanker, a class of water and oil carrying tankships of the Chinese PLAN navy
- Ferrari 637, a Ferrari racecar
- Škoda 637, a Czechoslovak car
- Avro 637, an Interwar British biplane aircraft
- Potez 637, an Interwar French Air Force plane
- Vickers Type 637, a British post-World War II transport plane

== Other uses ==
- 637: Always and Forever, a 2001 album by Crystal Kay
- Aeroflot Flight F-637 of 4 December 1984, which crashed
- London Buses route 637, London, England, UK; a bus route
