= Škoda 633 =

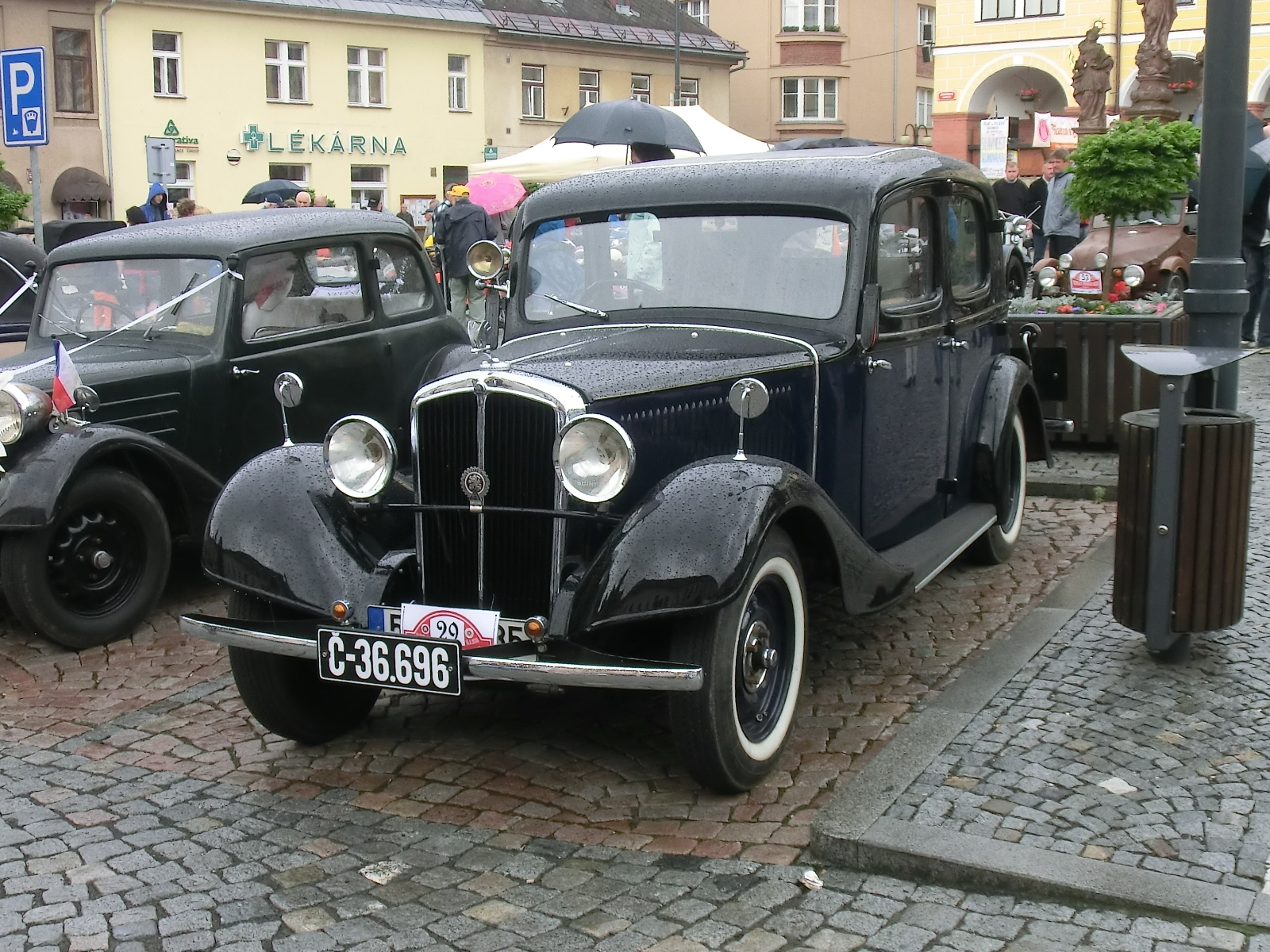
- 1933 Škoda 633

Overview
- Manufacturer: ASAP, subsidiary of Škoda Works
- Production: 1931–1934
- Assembly: Mladá Boleslav, Czechoslovakia

Body and chassis
- Chassis: backbone chassis

Powertrain
- Engine: six-cylinder 1,792 cc SV, 33 hp (25 kW)

Chronology
- Successor: Škoda 637 (1932); Škoda Favorit (1936)

The Škoda 633 is a Czechoslovak mid-size car that was made by Škoda from 1931 to 1934.

== Details ==
The Type 633 has a six-cylinder 1,792 cc sidevalve engine that produces 33 hp (25 kW). It is based on the 1,195 cc engine of the Škoda 422, with the number of cylinders increased from four to six.

The Type 633 has a three-speed transmission and 12 Volt electrics. It has a top speed of 100 km/h (62 mph) and its fuel consumption is 12 litres per 100 km.

Škoda built the Type 633 on a ladder frame and offered it as a two-door or four-door saloon or convertible. For 1934 Škoda slightly revised the saloon body with a more curvilinear roof.

Škoda used a version of the Type 633's six-cylinder engine, enlarged to 1,961 cc, for the Type 637 which it launched in 1932.

Škoda discontinued the 633 in 1934 after producing 504 cars. Withdrawal of the 633 left a gap in Škoda's range in the 1.8 litre class until 1936, when it launched the Škoda Favorit.

== Across the Sahara ==
In 1933 a Czechoslovak engineer, George Hanuš, drove a 633 from Czechoslovakia 9,716 km (6,037 mi) to Dakar. He had commercial sponsors including Kudrnáč Náchod, Julius Meinl, Scintilla Vertex, SKF, Vacuum Oil Company and VARTA.

On 17 February 1933 Hanuš set off in the 633 from Radlík near Jesenice in central Bohemia. He crossed by ship from Marseille to Algiers and then drove across the Sahara, reaching Dakar on 17 March after exactly a month.

The difficult journey increased fuel consumption to an average of 13.75 litres per 100 km. On the harshest section, which took him south to Gao, consumption rose to 18 litres per 100 km. But the car remained reliable and completed the journey without a breakdown.

== Source ==
- Tuček, Jan (2017). Auta první republiky 1918–1938 (in Czech). Prague: Grada Publishing. pp. 132–134. ISBN 978-80-271-0466-6.
