= Škoda Rapid Six =

The Škoda Rapid Six was a car manufactured by Skoda in 1935. The larger sister model of the Škoda Rapid, the two-door coupe had a streamlined body in wood-steel hybrid construction. Only four such cars were ever made.

== Technical specifications ==
The gasoline-powered, water-cooled car had the following specifications:

- Capacity: 1,961 cubic centimetres (119.7 cu in)
- Bore: 68.0 millimetres (2.68 in)
- Stroke: 90.0 millimetres (3.54 in)
- Compression ratio: 6.0:1
- Maximum power: 37.0 kilowatts (50.3 PS) at 3500 rpm
- Wheelbase: 2,620 millimetres (103 in)
- Front track: 1,150 millimetres (45 in)
- Rear track: 1,170 millimetres (46 in)
- Length: 4,000 millimetres (160 in)
- Width: 1,380 millimetres (54 in)
- Height: 1,420 millimetres (56 in)
- Weight: 1,050 millimetres (41 in)
- Maximum speed: 130 kilometres per hour (81 mph)
