= Škoda VOS =

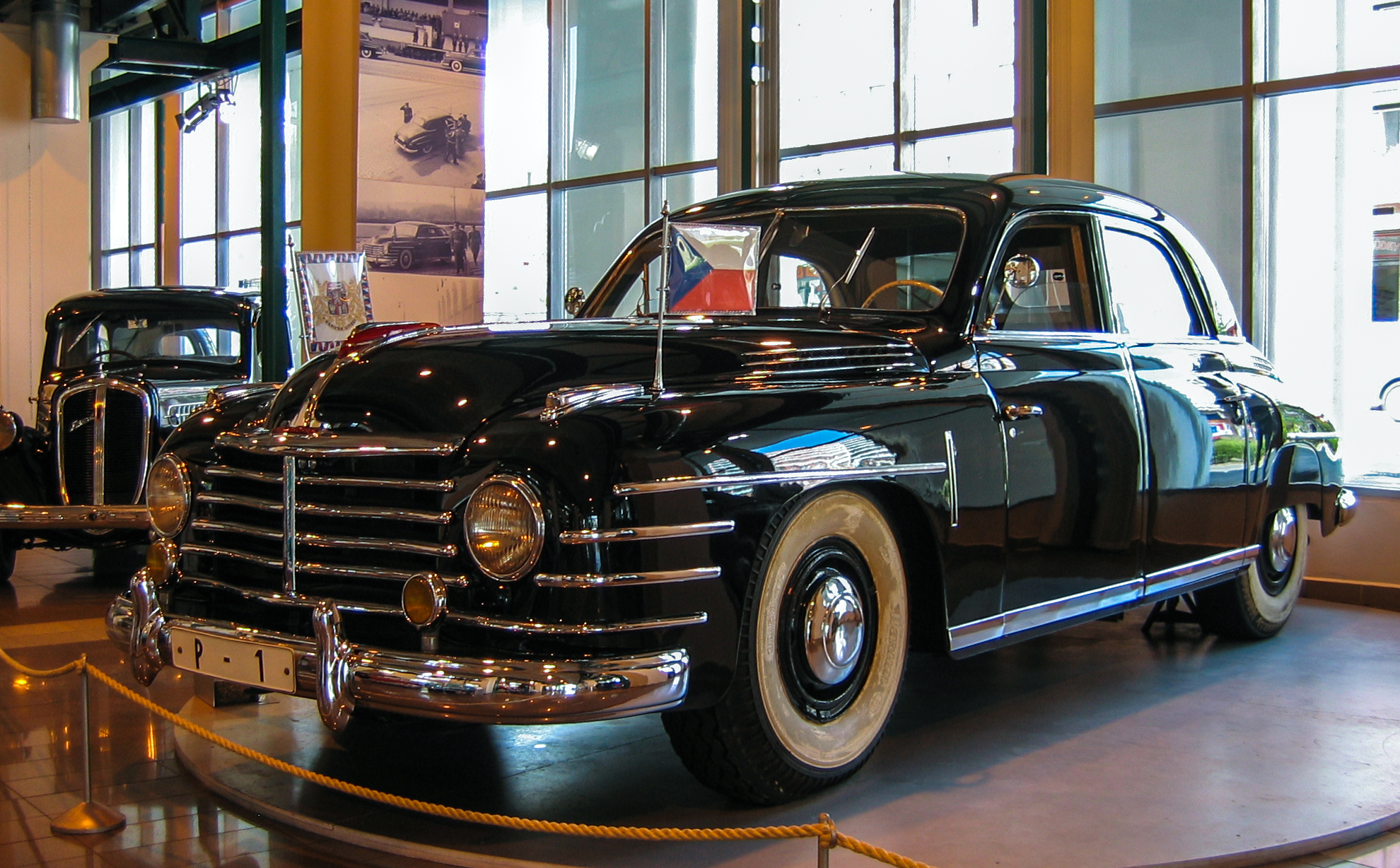

Overview
- Manufacturer: AZNP
- Production: 1949–1952

Body and chassis
- Class: Full-size luxury car (F)
- Body style: 4-door limousine 4-door saloon
- Layout: Front-engine, rear-wheel-drive

Powertrain
- Engine: 5.2 L Praga OHV I6
- Transmission: 4 speed manual

Dimensions
- Wheelbase: 3,200 mm (126 in)
- Length: 5,700 mm (224 in)
- Width: 1,950 mm (77 in)
- Height: 1,750 mm (69 in)

Chronology
- Predecessor: Škoda Superb

The Škoda VOS is a full-size luxury car produced by the Czechoslovak automaker AZNP at their plant in Mladá Boleslav between 1949 and 1952. For a few years it was the preferred car for senior political and military personnel in Czechoslovakia. It was never sold to the general public.

== Background ==
In 1949 the plant at Mladá Boleslav assembled the last Škoda Superbs, large six-cylinder limousines evoking the style of American cars in the late 1930s. The authorities needed a more modern replacement and instructed Škoda to develop one. This was the car that would become the Škoda VOS. The letters VOS indicated a "special car for the government" in Czech or Slovak (Vládní Osobní Speciál or Vládny Osobný Špeciál).

== Design and Production ==
The car went into production in 1950 with the bus manufacturer and coachbuilder Karosa. Final assembly took place at Škoda's own plant. The car was designed by Oldrich Meduna who previously designed military tanks. The car had a front-mounted 5.2-litre engine delivering 120 PS (88 kW) and driving the rear wheels. The engine came from a Praga truck. Because of the weight of the armour plating, the standard car weighed nearly 4 tons. The top speed was restricted to 80 km/h (50 mph) on the orders of the interior ministry. A "Light-weight" version without the armour plating was also listed.

Unusually for the time, the car was fitted with air-conditioning. The air-conditioning mechanism occupied most of the space in the boot, and it became common for dignitaries moving by VOS to travel followed by a second car to carry luggage.

== Celebrity connections ==
Famous owners included President Gottwald, Enver Hoxha, Zhu De, Ana Pauker and Mao Zedong.

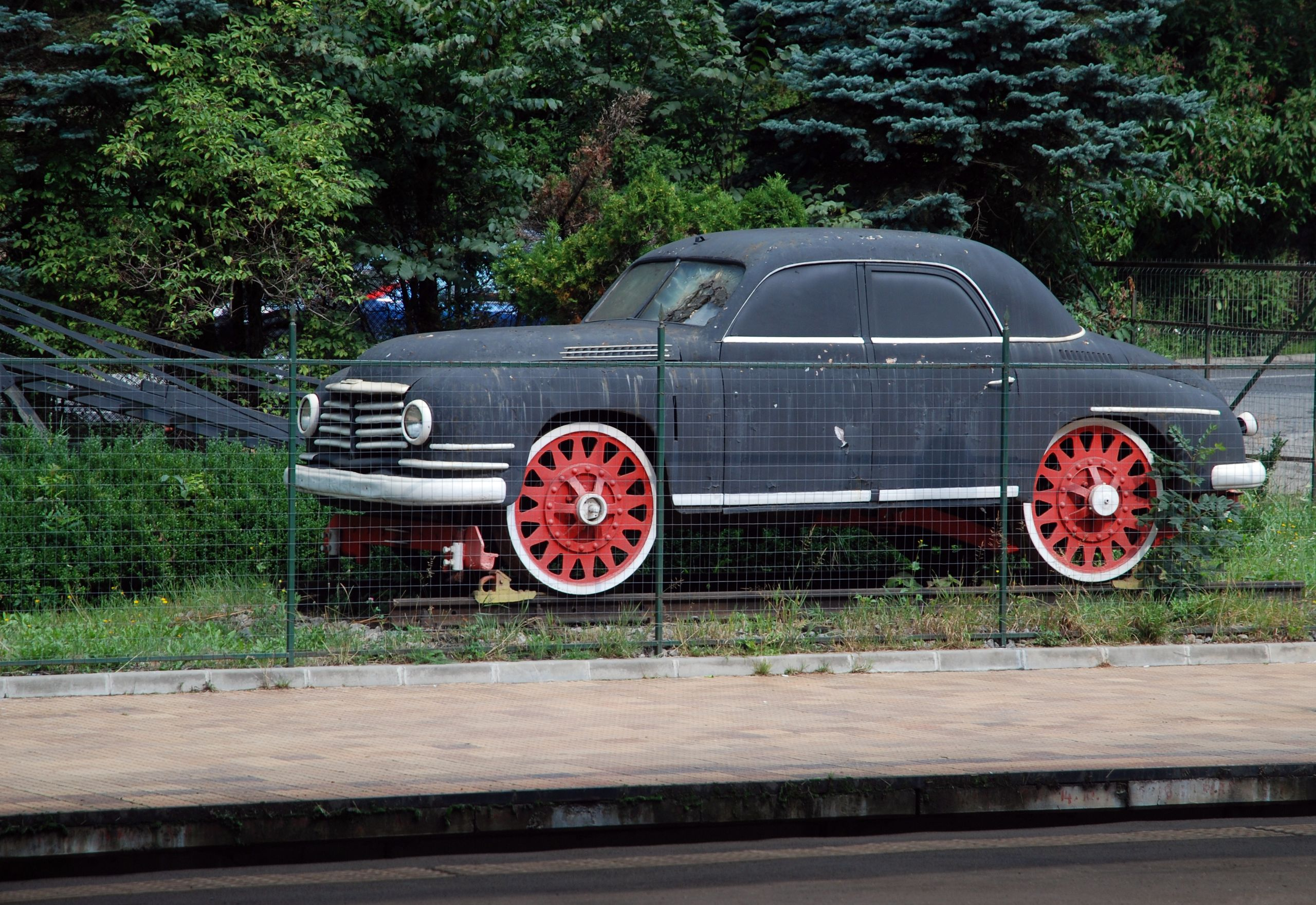
Ana Pauker's draisine built from a Škoda VOS

Ana Pauker, the communist leader of the Romanian Workers' Party (later to become the Romanian Communist Party ) had a Škoda VOS built for running on tracks, reaching speeds of up to 115 km/h with a total weight of 5 tons. The model is now up for display in the train Station of Sinaia. The driver's secure wind shield is smashed after a supposed attempted attack near the Roşiori Nord train station.

== The end ==
Production of the VOS ended in 1952, by when 107 had been built. Škoda were not invited to replace the car, and the nation's political elite switched to the Tatra 603.

== Sources ==
- Bernard Vermeylen, Voitures des pays de l'Est, Boulogne-Billancourt, ETAI, 2008, 239 p. (ISBN 9782726888087) (OCLC 470767381)
- KRÁLÍK, Jan: Utajené projekty Škoda; GRADA Publishing 2007, ISBN 978-80-247-2416-4
- CEDRYCH, Mario René & NACHTMANN, Lukáš: ŠKODA – auta známá i neznámá; GRADA Publishing 2003, ISBN 80-247-9052-1
- Škoda VOS: Pro bolševiky od Prahy po Peking
