= Škoda Rapid (1935–1947) =

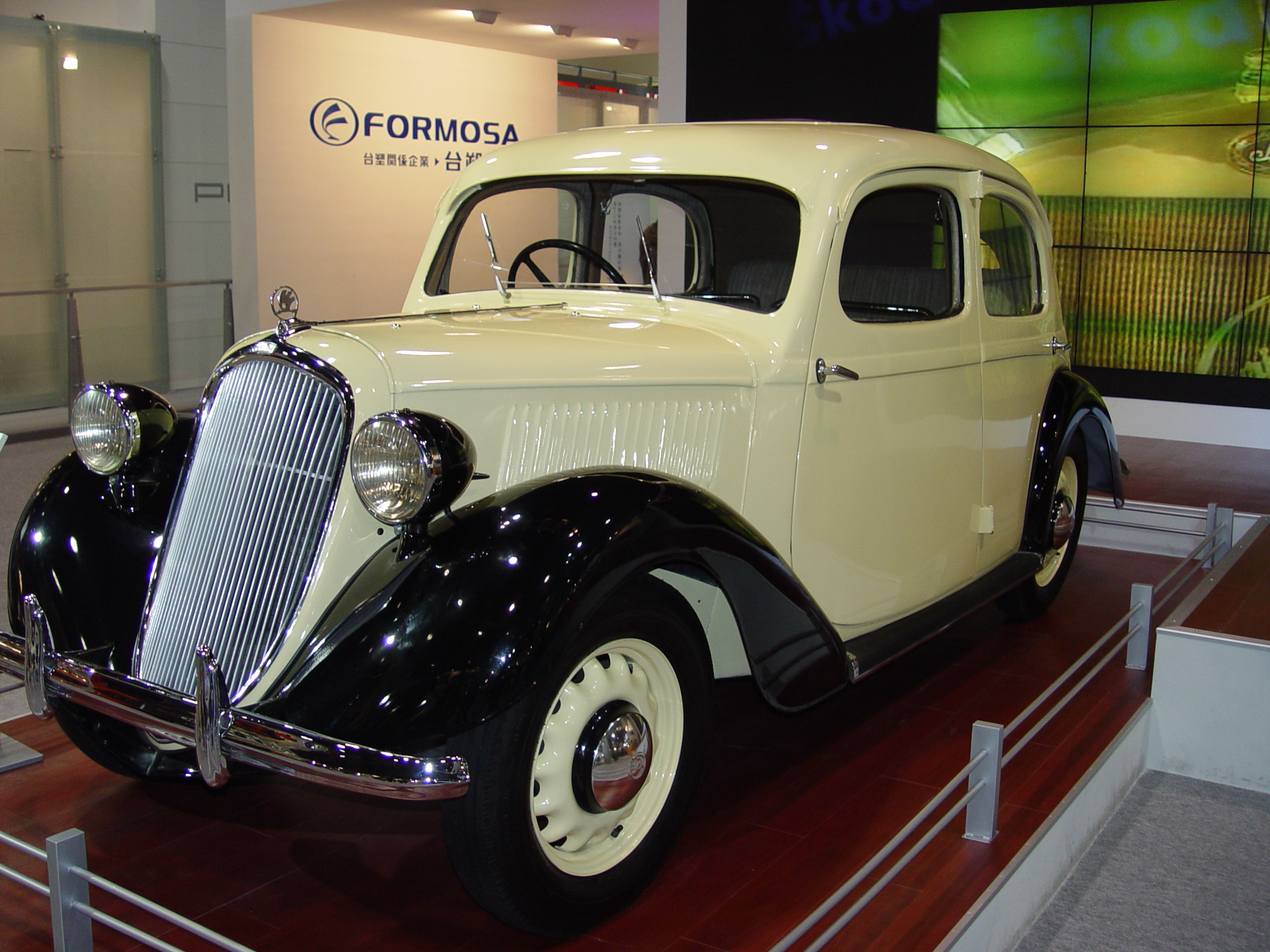
- 1935 Škoda Rapid four-door saloon

Overview
- Manufacturer: ASAP, subsidiary of Škoda Works
- Production: 1935–1947
- Assembly: Mladá Boleslav, Czechoslovakia

Body and chassis
- Chassis: backbone chassis

Powertrain
- Engine: Type 901/914: 1386 cc SV I4; Type 922: 1558 cc OHV I4

The Škoda Rapid is a mid-size car that was made in Czechoslovakia by Škoda from 1935 to 1947. Škoda had first applied the "Rapid" name to a version of its 1195 cc Popular Type 920 made in 1934–1935. From 1935, however, it transferred the name to a new, larger model.

The Rapid Type 901 has a 1386 cc sidevalve engine and was built 1935–1938. It was succeeded by the Rapid OHV (Type 922) which has a 1558 cc overhead valve engine and was built 1938–1947.

There was a six-cylinder sister model, the Škoda Rapid Six (Type 910), with a 1961 cc engine, which was launched in 1935.

In 1984 Škoda revived the "Rapid" name for the Rapid version of the Škoda Type 742 (120/130). Since 2010, the company has also used the name on a succession of models built in its factory at Pune in India.

== Concept ==
In the 1930s Škoda introduced a new range of cars with a backbone chassis and all-round independent suspension. The backbone design was aimed to solve the lack of torsional stiffness in the ladder frame of previous models. The chassis was developed under the leadership of chief engineer Vladimír Matouš and derived from one designed by Hans Ledwinka for Tatra.

The first models in the new range were the Popular compact car in 1934, followed by the Superb full-size car. The mid-range Rapid was added in 1935. It was followed by the Favorit in 1936.

== Type 901 ==
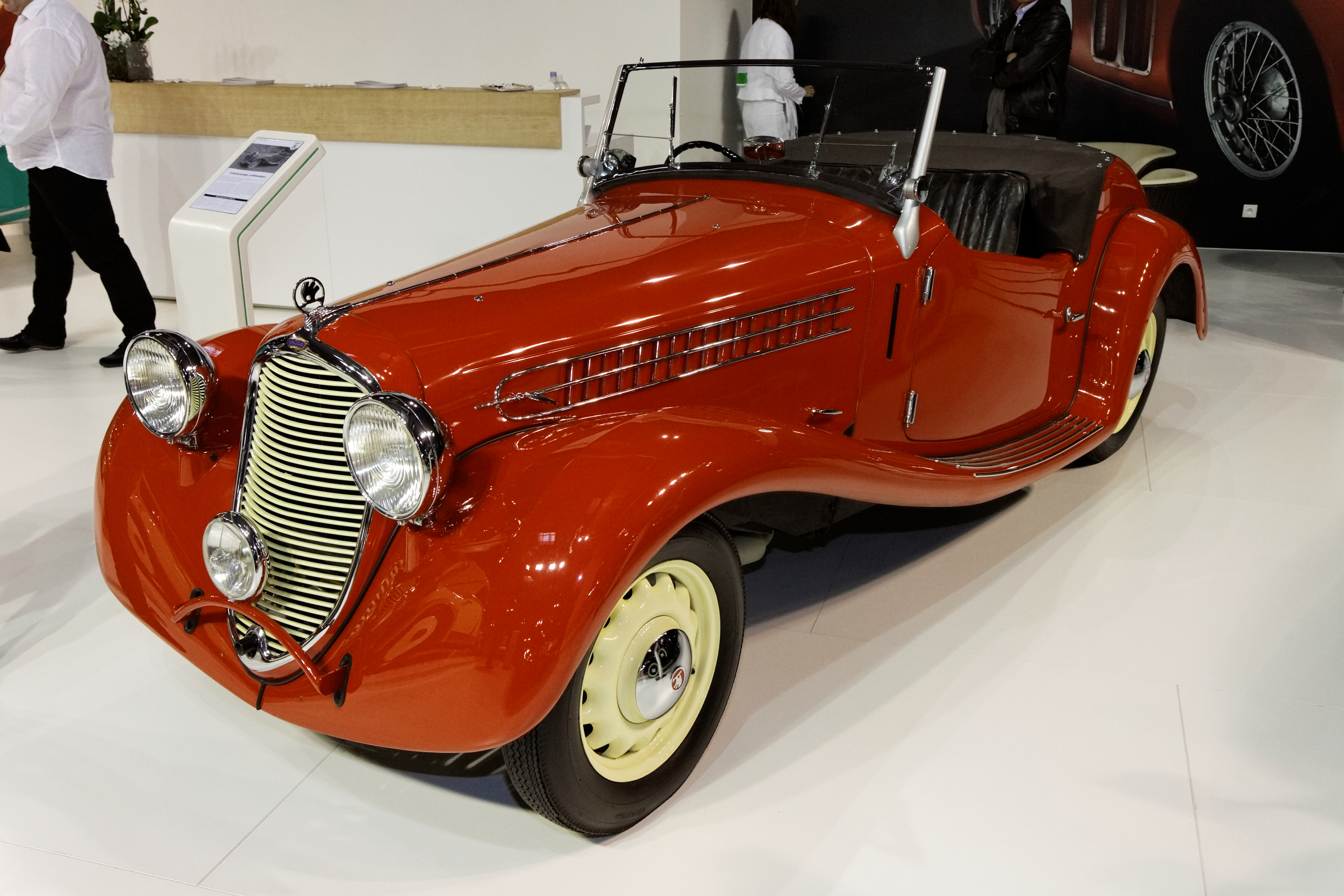
Rapid two-seat convertible

The Rapid Type 901 (later Type 914) had a four-cylinder 1386 cc, 31 PS (23 kW) sidevalve engine and ATE-Lockheed brakes. It had a top speed of 100 km/h (62 mph) and its fuel consumption was between nine and 10 litres per 100 km. The choice of bodies offered included a two-door saloon, four-door saloon and two-door, four-seat convertible. There was also a commercial van version.

== Type 922 ==
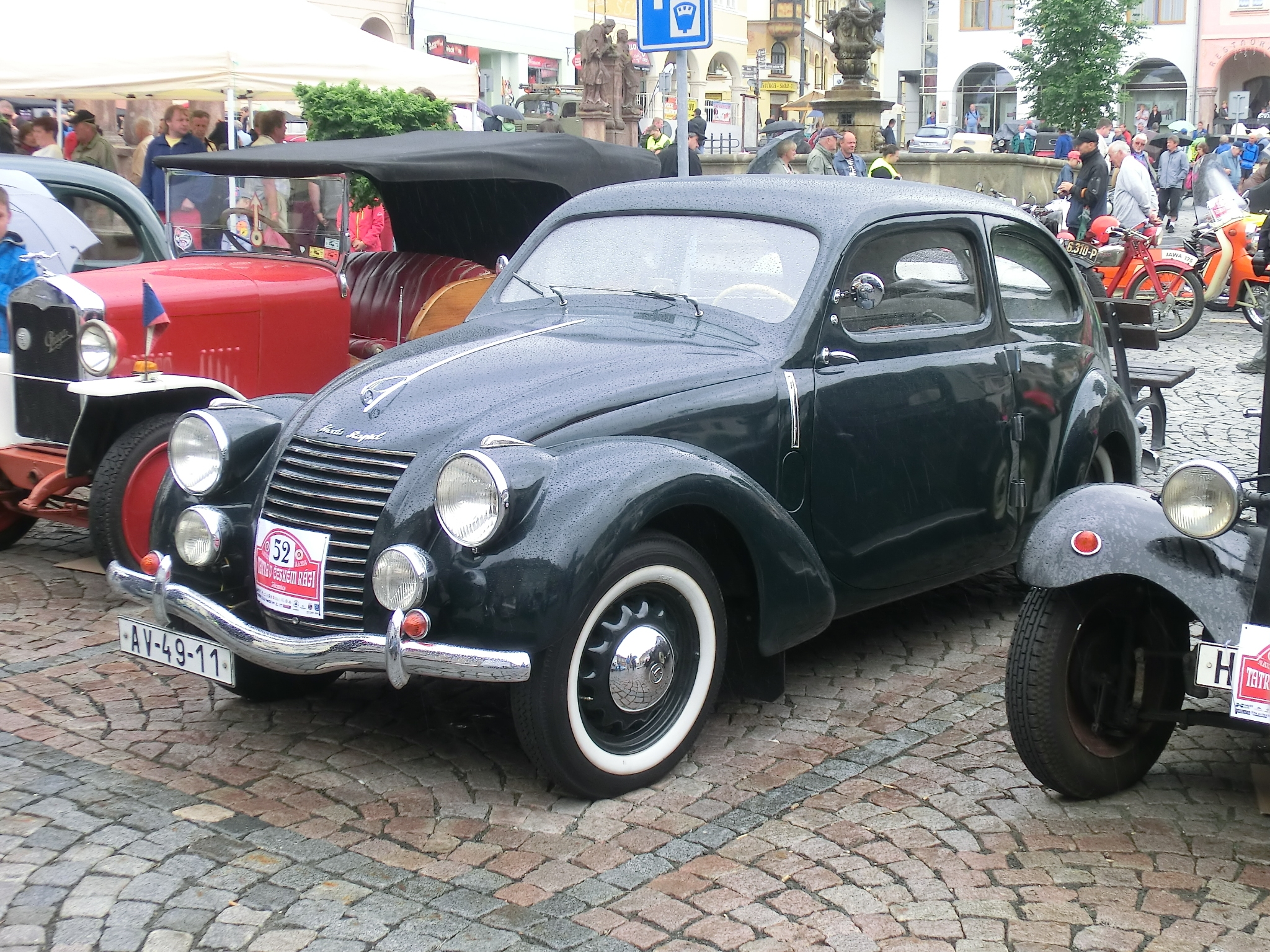
1940 Rapid OHV two-door saloon with aerodynamic body

Škoda revised the engine and in 1938 launched the Type 922, which it marketed as the Rapid OHV. It had enlarged the engine to 1558 cc and given it overhead valves, which increased power to 42 PS (31 kW), although top speed remained 100 km/h (62 mph). The new model's fuel consumption was 10 litres per 100 km. The choice of bodies included two-door and four-door saloons.

In 1938 Škoda launched a streamlined version of the 1558 cc Rapid OHV with a new aerodynamic two-door saloon body. It bears a strong resemblance to the streamlined four-door body that Škoda built for its Type 935 prototypes in 1935–1938.

== Bibliography ==
- Králík, Jan (2008). V soukolí okřídleného šípu (in Czech). Prague: Grada Publishing. pp. 19–22. ISBN 978-80-271-0177-1.
- Schwartz, Jiří; Wohlmuth, Jiří (2005). Automobily Škoda Superb: Konstrukce, technické hodnoty, údržba (in Czech). Prague: Grada Publishing. p. 9. ISBN 9788024708799.
- Tuček, Jan (2017). Auta první republiky 1918–1938 (in Czech). Prague: Grada Publishing. ISBN 978-80-271-0466-6.
