= Škoda 1101/1102 =

Škoda 1101, 1102
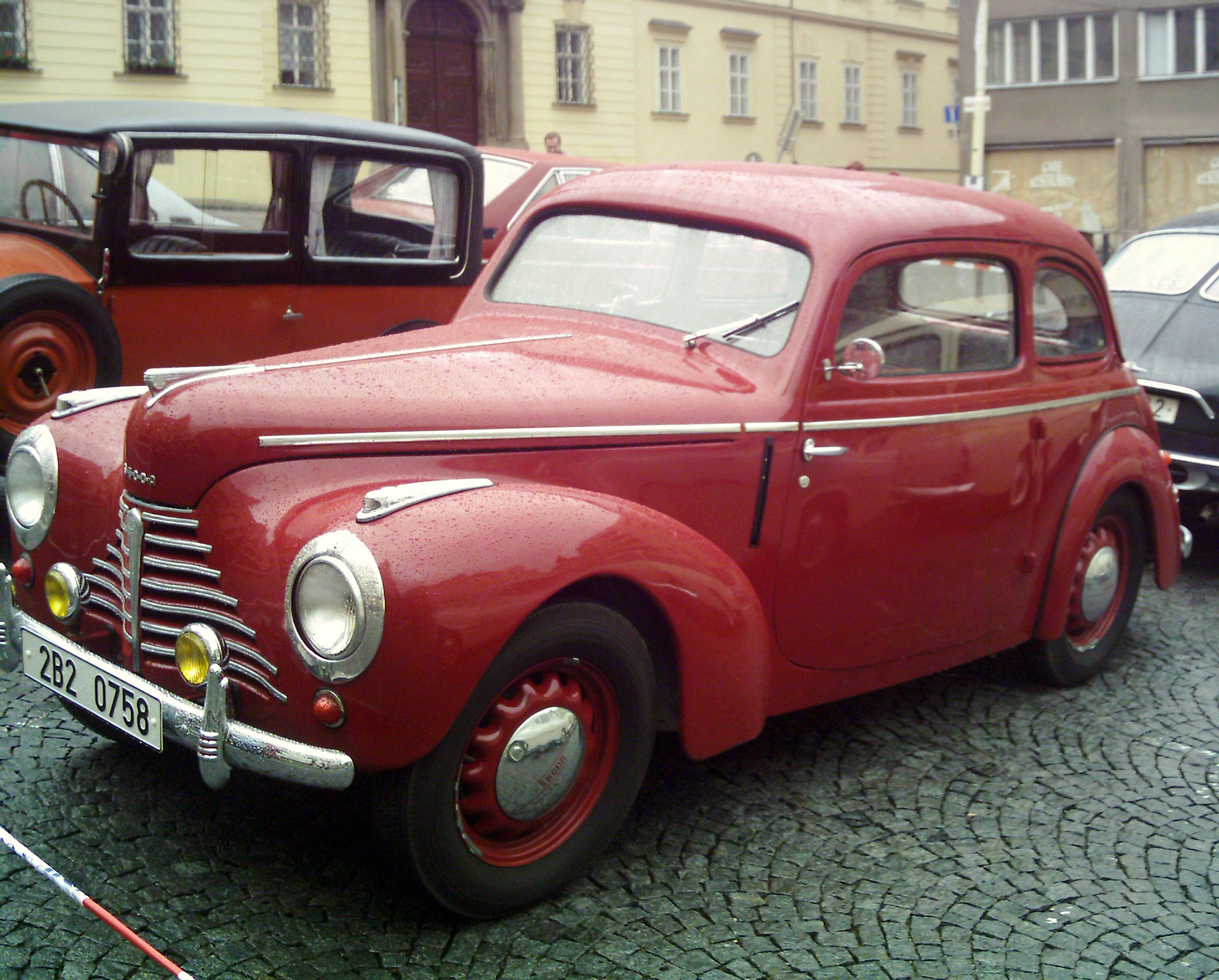
- Škoda 1101 Tudor

Overview
- Manufacturer: AZNP
- Production: 1946–1952; 71,591 produced

Body and chassis
- Body style: 2-door sedan 4-door sedan 2-door roadster 2-door cabriolet-coupe 3-door station wagon 3-door van 3-door ambulance 4-door military
- Layout: FR layout

Powertrain
- Engine: 1089 cc Straight-4 32 hp

Dimensions
- Wheelbase: 2,485 mm (97.8 in)
- Length: 4,050 mm (159.4 in)
- Width: 1,500 mm (59.1 in)
- Height: 1,520 mm (59.8 in)
- Curb weight: 940–1,090 kg (2,072–2,403 lb)

Chronology
- Predecessor: Škoda Popular
- Successor: Škoda 1200

The Škoda 1101 is a small family car that was produced by Czechoslovak automaker AZNP at their plants in Mladá Boleslav, Vrchlabí and Kvasiny. It was basically a modernized version of the Škoda Popular 1101, which was introduced in 1939. The main differences were a redesigned body (although still with wooden frame) and a new dashboard. Production of the Škoda 1101 began in 1946.

In 1949 the Škoda 1102 entered production. It was virtually identical with 1101 type, except for a new column-mounted shifter. The two models were produced simultaneously, with 1102 chassis preferably used for sedan bodies and 1101 for vans, station-wagons and ambulances. Production ceased in 1952, by when about 67,000 vehicles had been made, of which some 50,000 vehicles were exported.

The Škoda 1101/1102 is also known by the popular name Tudor, derived from its two-door sedan body, which was the first to come into production. This nickname was eventually commonly used for all 1101/1102, regardless of their body.

A military version of the Škoda 1101 was built, called the Škoda 1101 VO. It has the same chassis and engine as the standard Škoda 1101, with a new all-steel, open 4-door body. In 1948–51 4,237 vehicles were produced, most of them for export.

== Specifications ==
The car is powered by a four-cylinder 1089 cc OHV water-cooled engine producing at maximum power 32 hp at 4,200 rpm. The four-speed gear-box includes synchromesh on the top two ratios, power being delivered to the rear wheels via a jointed prop shaft.

- Front suspension: Independent using transverse leaf springs.
- Rear suspension: independent using transverse leaf springs with floating half-axles.
- Top speed: 100 km/h (62 mph).

== Gallery ==
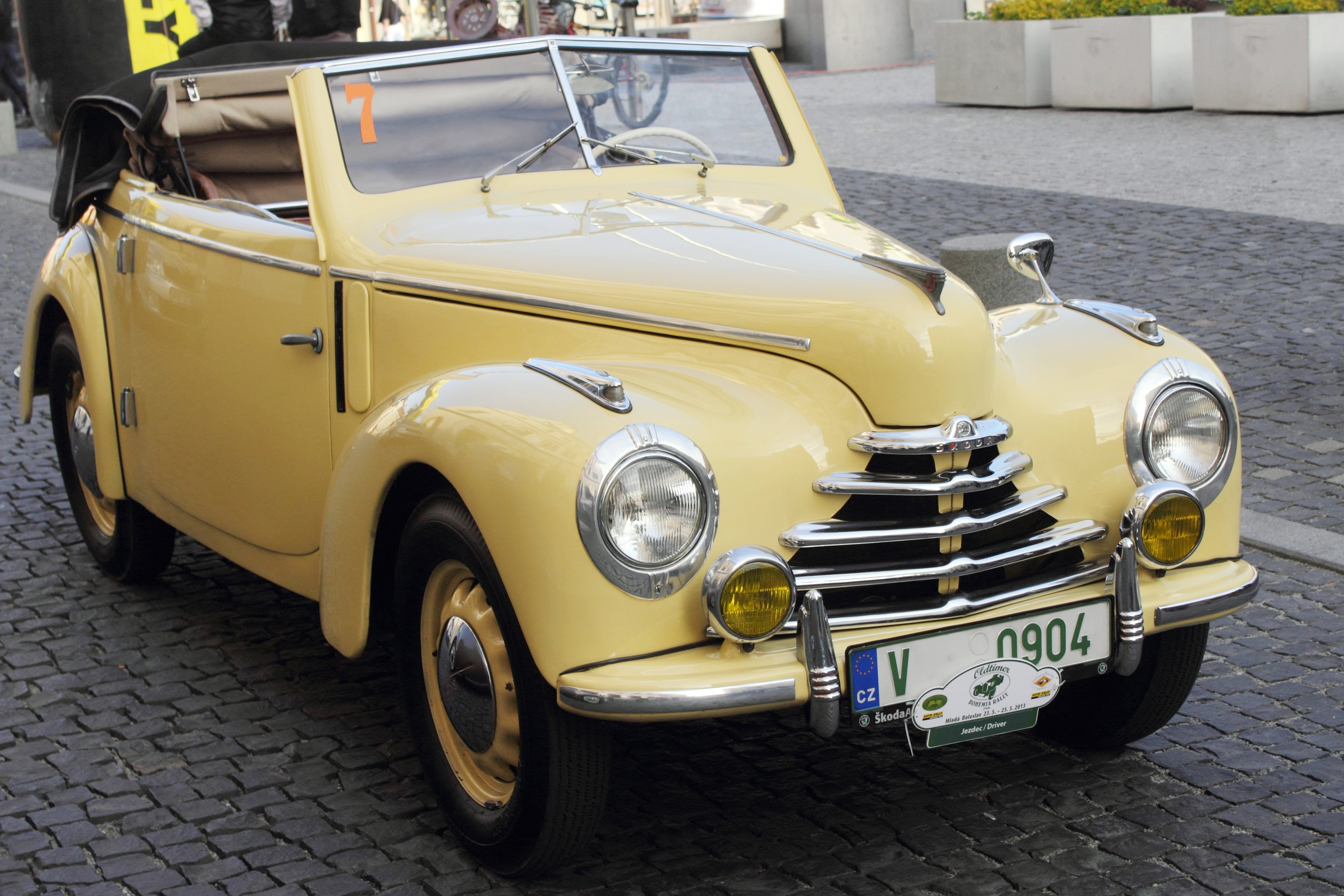
Škoda 1102 roadster

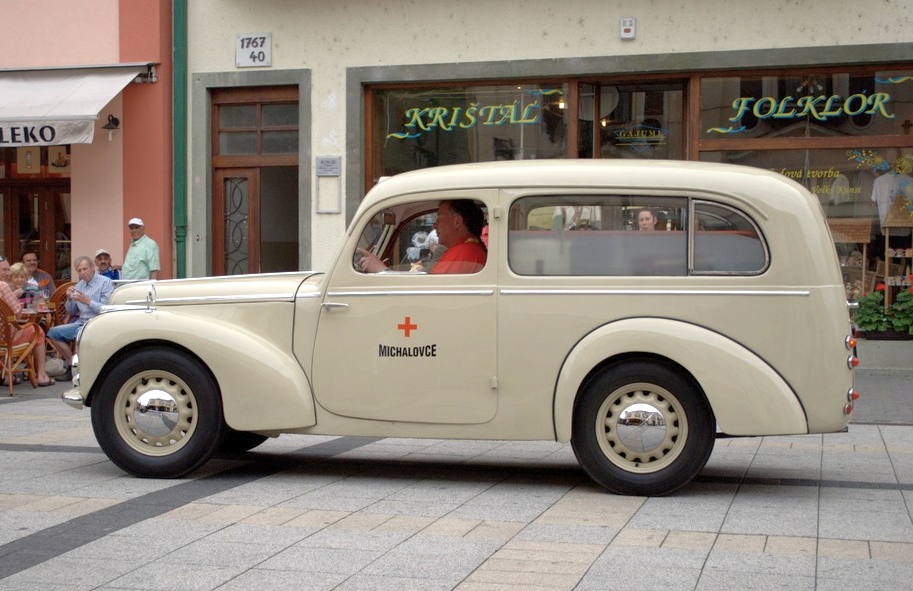
Škoda 1101 ambulance

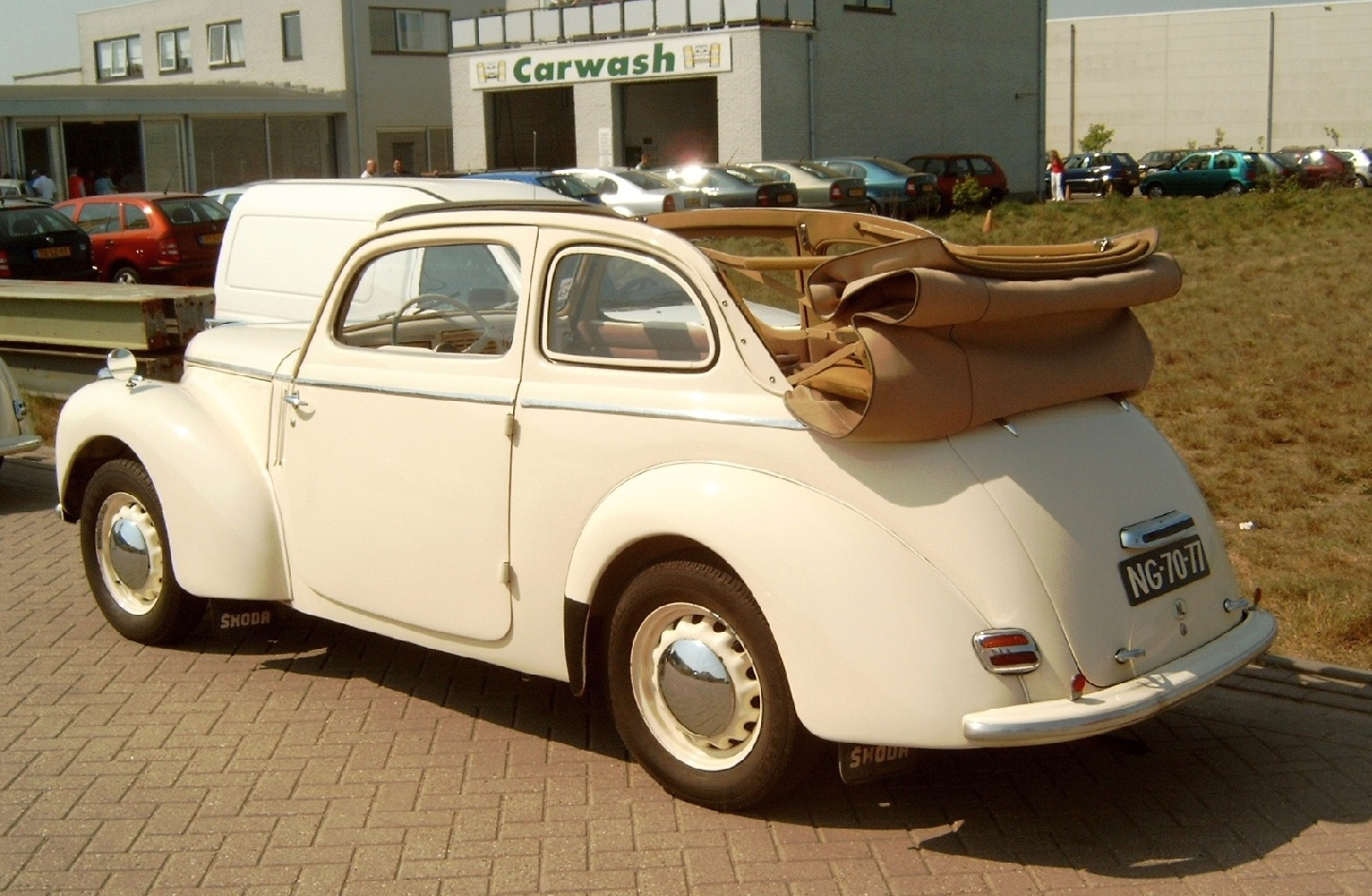
Škoda 1102 cabriolet-coupe

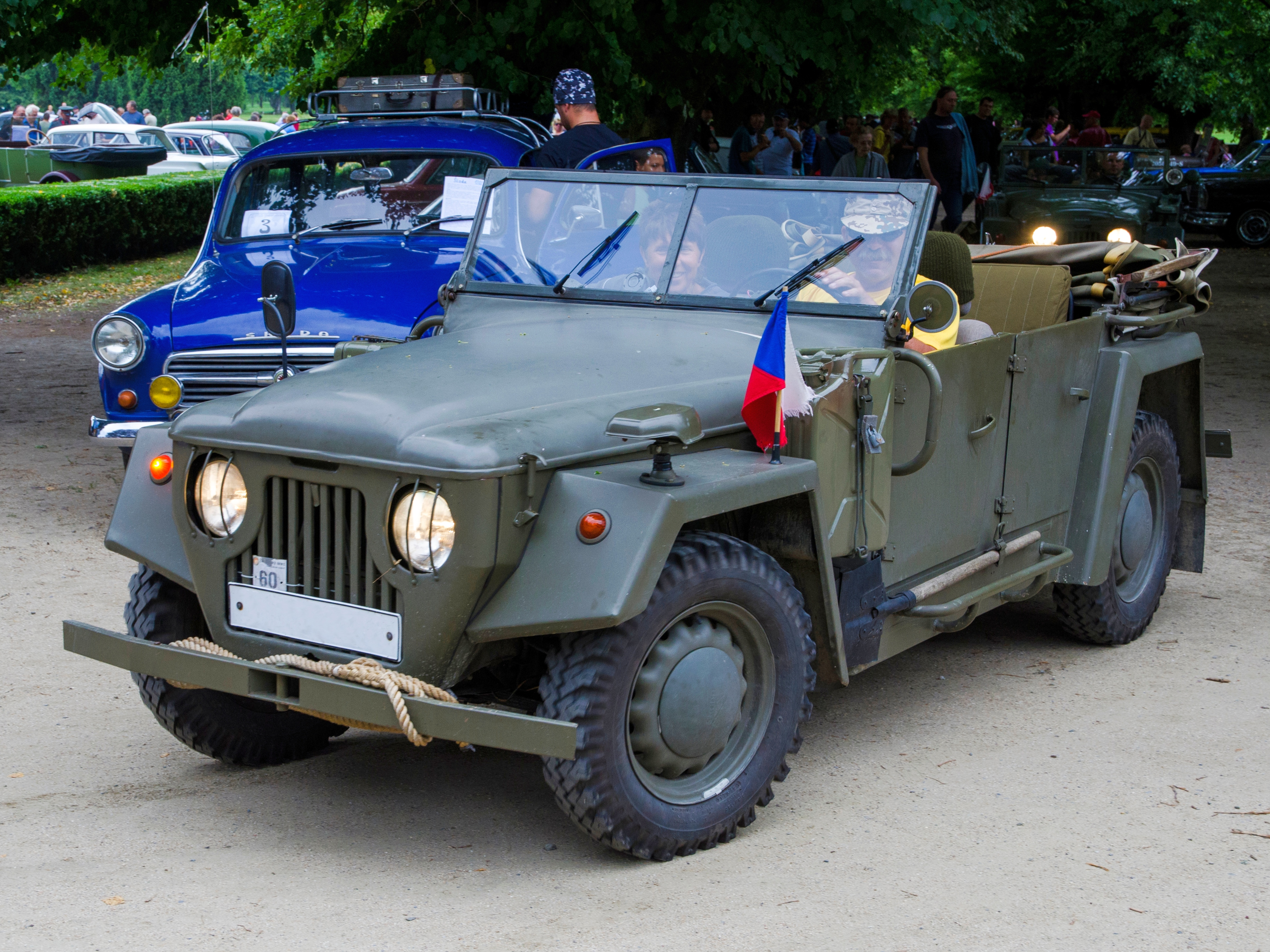
Škoda 1101 VO
