= List of highways numbered 638 =

Route 638, or Highway 638, may refer to:

== Canada ==
- Ontario Highway 638
- Saskatchewan Highway 638

== United Kingdom ==
- A638 road
- London Buses route 638

== United States ==
- MD 638
- SR 638
- PR-638
- FM 638
- SR 638

Preceded by 637	Lists of highways 638	Succeeded by 639
