= Škoda Favorit (1936–1941) =

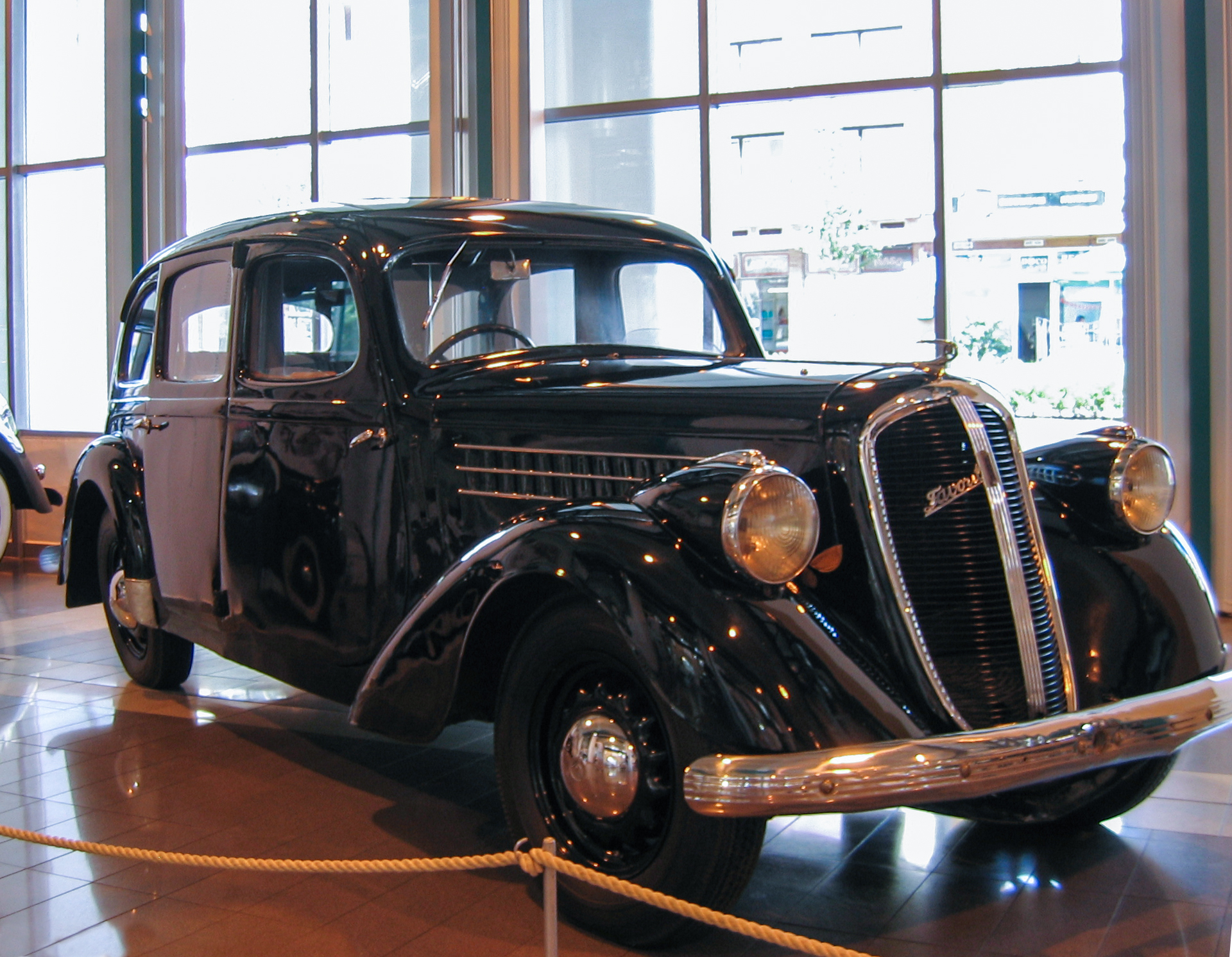
- Škoda Favorit Type 904

Overview
- Manufacturer: ASAP, subsidiary of Škoda Works
- Production: 1936–1941
- Assembly: Mladá Boleslav, Czechoslovakia

Body and chassis
- Chassis: backbone chassis

Powertrain
- Engine: Type 904: four-cylinder 1,802 cc SV, 38 hp (28 kW); Type 923: four-cylinder 2,091 cc OHV, 40.5 hp (30 kW)

Chronology
- Predecessor: Škoda 633

The Škoda Favorit is a mid-size car that was made in Czechoslovakia by Škoda from 1936 to 1941. The original Favorit Type 904 has an 1,802 cc sidevalve engine and was built 1936–39. It was succeeded by the Favorit 2000 OHV which has a 2,091 cc overhead valve engine and was built 1938–41.

Neither type sold well, so Škoda discontinued them to concentrate on other products.

The company revived the model name in 1987 for its successful Favorit supermini.

== Concept ==
In the 1930s Škoda introduced a new range of cars built on a backbone chassis. First came the Popular compact car in 1934, followed by the Superb full-size car. The mid-range Rapid was added in 1935. The Favorit was the last to be launched, entering production in 1936. It is a mid-range model, larger and more powerful than the Rapid but smaller and more economical than the Superb.

== Type 904 ==
The Favorit Type 904 has a four-cylinder 1,802 cc sidevalve engine that produces 38 horsepower (28 kW) and gives it a top speed of 95 km/h (59 mph). At a steady 60 kilometres per hour (37 mph) its fuel consumption is 14 or 15 litres per 100 km. The choice of bodies offered included a two-door saloon and a four-door "six-light" saloon. There was also an ambulance version. Sales were disappointing. Škoda persisted with the 904 for three years, but when it ceased production in 1939 only 173 examples had been built.

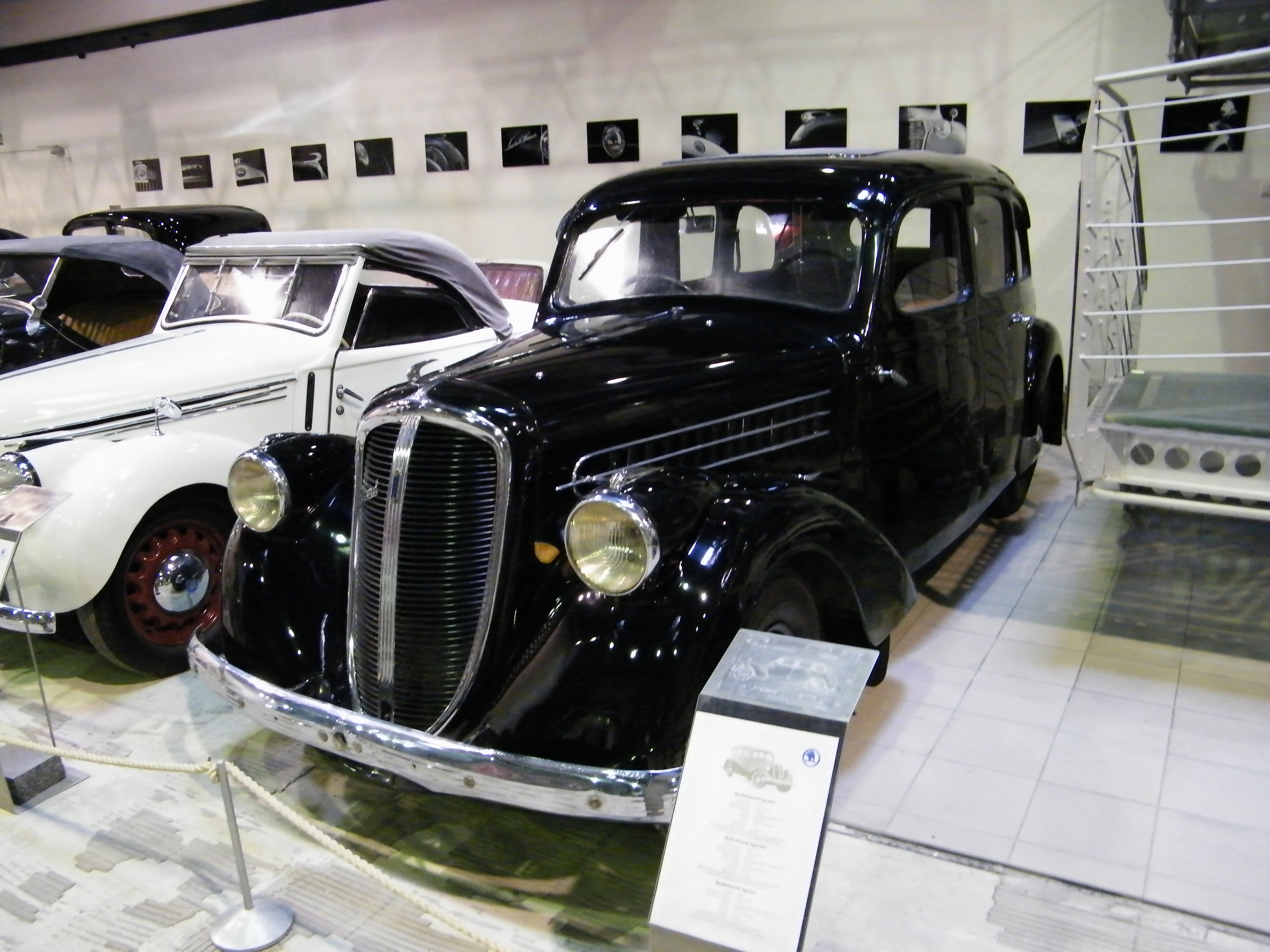
Škoda Favorit in the Škoda museum at Mladá Boleslav

== Type 923 ==
Škoda revised the engine and in 1938 launched the Type 923, which it marketed as the Favorit 2000 OHV. Škoda had enlarged the engine to 2,091 cc and given it overhead valves, which increased output to 40.5 horsepower (30.2 kW) and its top speed to 110 km/h (68 mph). Increased performance did not increase sales; Škoda had built only 54 of the 2000 OHV type when it ceased production in 1941.

From 1939 Škoda used this 2.1-litre engine in a new 1.5-tonne truck, the Škoda 150. After the Second World War the truck continued in production, first as the Aero 150 and then as the Praga A150, until 1951.

== Sources and further reading ==
- Cedrych, Mario; Nachtmann, Lukáš (2007). Škoda: auta známá i neznámá (in Czech). Prague: Grada Publishing. pp. 63–70. ISBN 978-80-247-1719-7.
- Kuba, Adolf; Spremo, Milan (1989). Atlas našich automobilů (in Czech). Vol. 3: 1929–1936. Prague: Nadas. p. 256.
- Spremo, Milan (1991). Atlas našich automobilů (in Czech). Vol. 4: 1937–1963. Prague: Nadas. p. 320.
- Tuček, Jan (2017). Auta první republiky 1918–1938 (in Czech). Prague: Grada Publishing. ISBN 978-80-271-0466-6.
