= List of highways numbered 639 =

The following highways are numbered 639:

== Canada ==
- Highway 639

== Ireland ==
- R639 road (Ireland)

== United States ==
- LA 639
- MD 639
- PR-639
- FM 639
- SR 639

Preceded by 638	Lists of highways 639	Succeeded by 640
