= Škoda Popular =

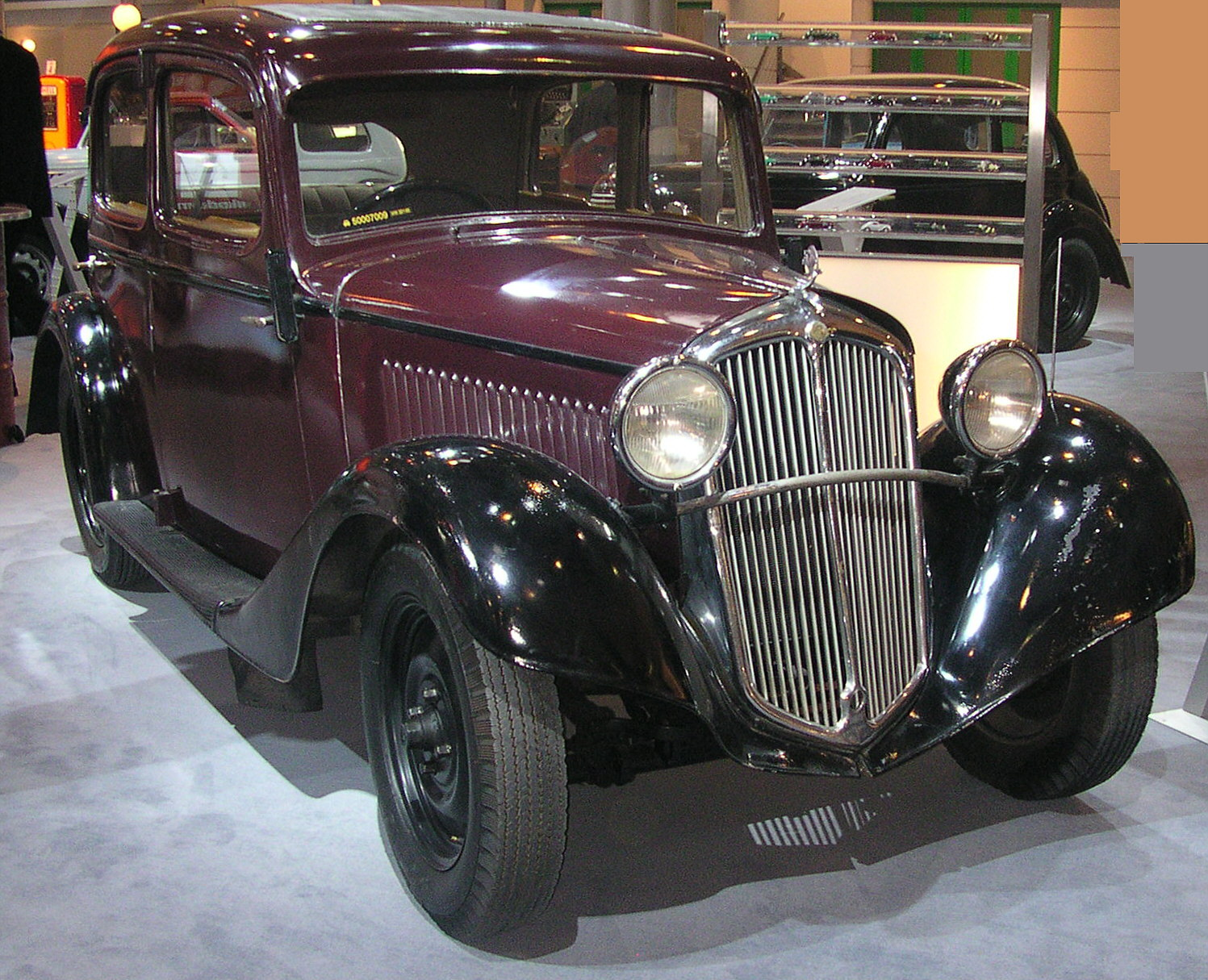
- Škoda Popular 420 Standard

Overview
- Manufacturer: ASAP, subsidiary of Škoda Works
- Production: 1934–1944, 1946
- Assembly: Mladá Boleslav, Czechoslovakia

Body and chassis
- Chassis: backbone chassis

Powertrain
- Engine: four-cylinder SV or OHV, 902–1089 cc, 18–32 horsepower (13–24 kW)

Chronology
- Predecessor: Škoda 422
- Successor: Škoda 1101

The Škoda Popular is a small family car that was made in Czechoslovakia by Škoda from 1933 to 1946. It was the company's most affordable car at the time.

== Concept ==
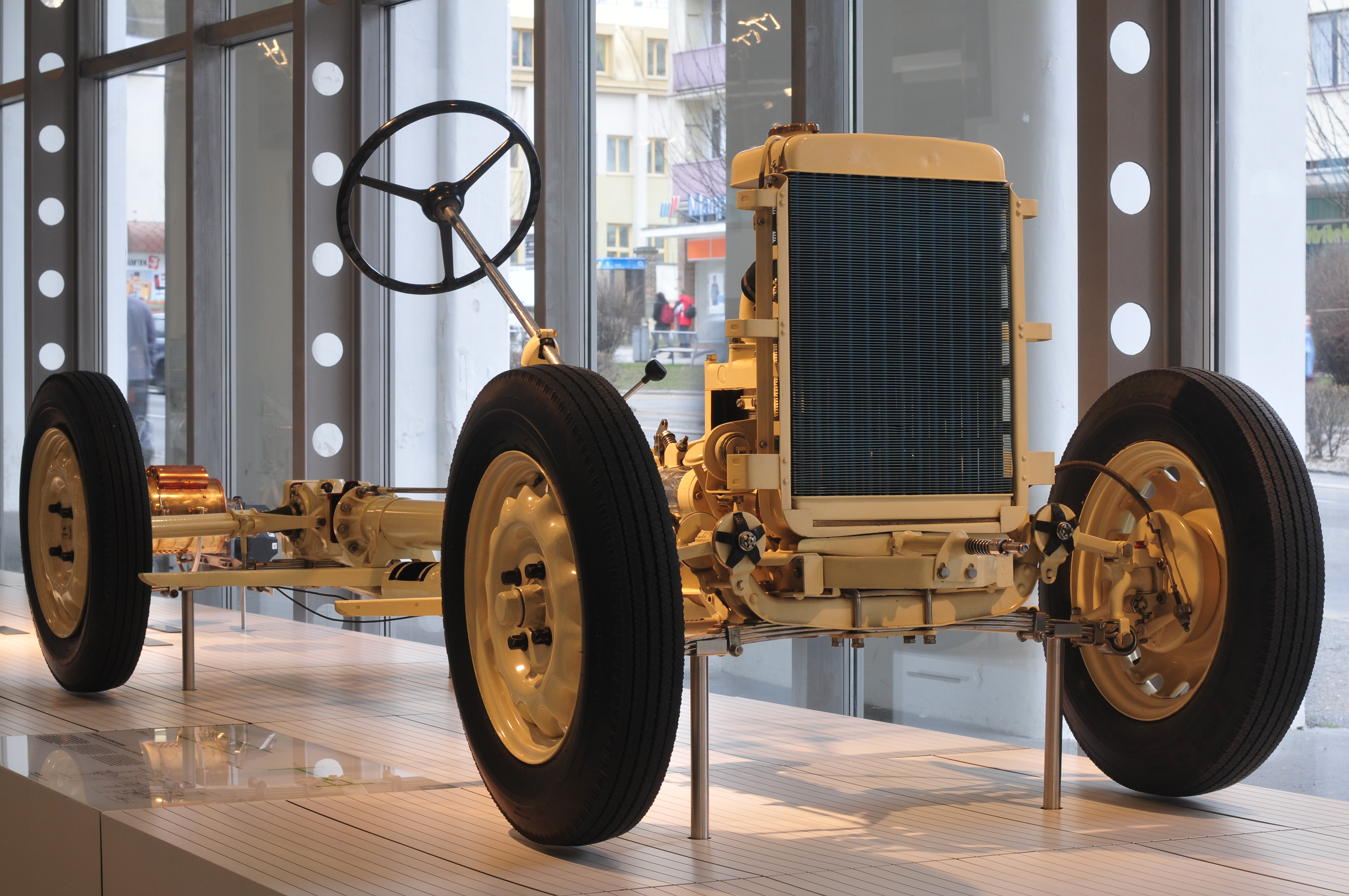
Škoda Popular chassis

In the early 1930s Škoda introduced a new line of cars that significantly differed from its previous products. A new design of chassis with backbone tube and all-around independent suspension was developed under the leadership of chief engineer Vladimír Matouš and derived from the one introduced by Hans Ledwinka in Tatra. First used on model Škoda 420 Standard in 1933, it aimed at solving the lack of torsional stiffness of the ladder frame.

The new design of chassis became the basis for models Popular (845–1,089 cc), Rapid (1,165–1,766 cc), Favorit (1,802–2,091 cc) and Superb (2,492–3,991 cc). In 1933 Škoda had 14% share of the Czechoslovak car market and third position behind Praga and Tatra. The new range made Škoda the market leader by 1936, with 39% share in 1938.

== Model history ==
The first car in the series was the Škoda 420 Standard, launched in 1933. It was a two-door saloon with 2,430 mm wheelbase and 995 cc, 20 horsepower (15 kW), four-cylinder sidevalve engine. 421 were built.

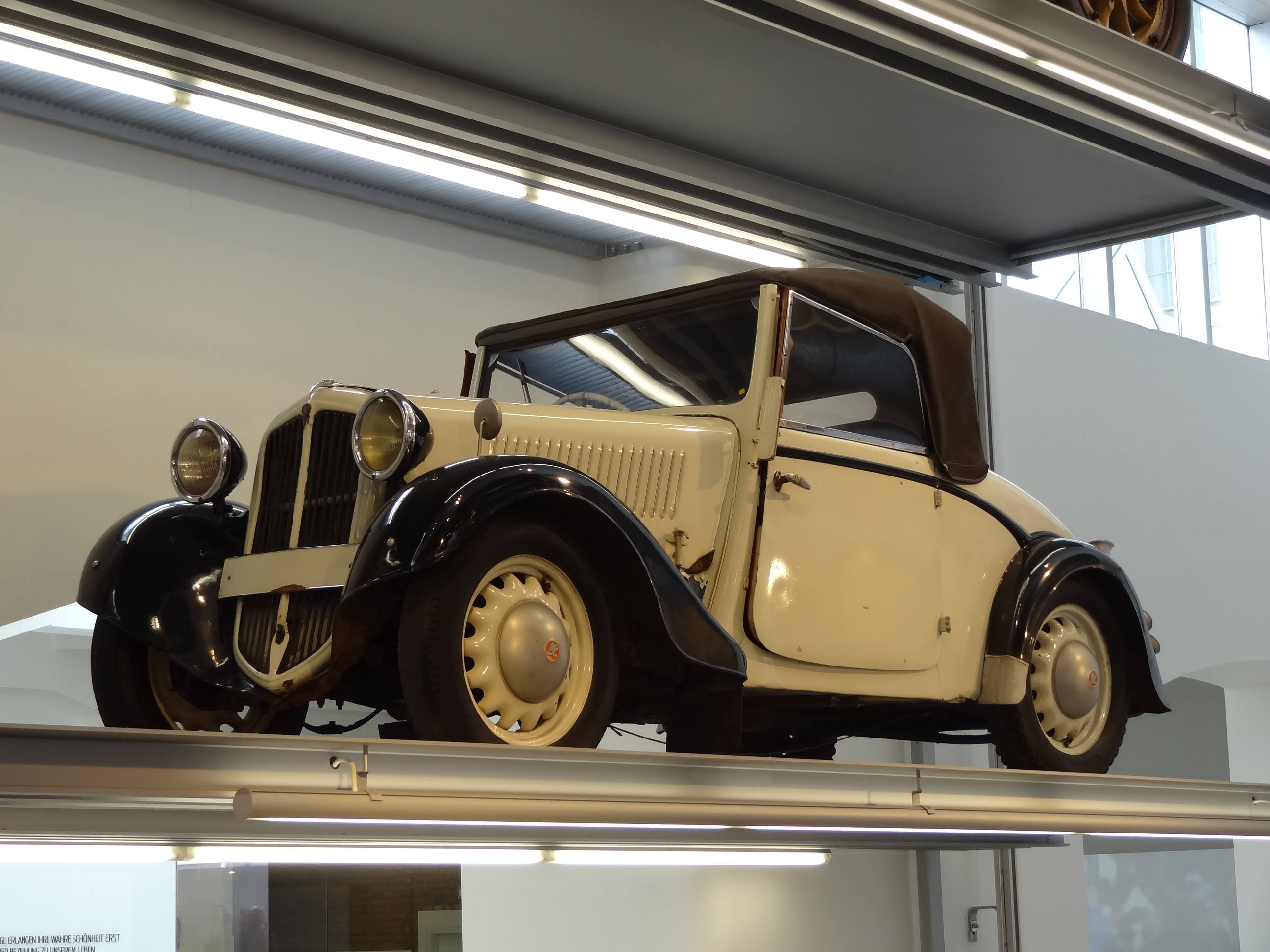
Škoda 418 Popular two-seat convertible

In 1934 Škoda introduced a smaller version, the 418 Popular. This had a shorter chassis and smaller engine, displacing only 902 cc and producing 18 horsepower (13 kW). A two-door saloon, two-door four-seat convertible and two-seat convertible roadster were offered, along with a commercial van with a 300 kg (660 lb) payload.

In 1934 a team of seven Czechoslovaks including Dr Zbislav Peters, Baron Jan Nádherný z Borutína and racing driver Zdeněk Pohl drove four Škoda Popular convertibles from Czechoslovakia to India. They left Prague on 12 May, drove 14,900 km (9,300 mi) through Turkey, Syria, Afghanistan and India and reached Calcutta on 10 September.

Production of the 418 did not continue after 1934, and only 200 were made, but Škoda applied the "Popular" name to subsequent versions of the 995 cc model 420. In 1935 the 420 Popular body was revised and the wheelbase was increased from 2,300 mm to 2,430 mm, the same as the original 418 Standard. Noticeable changes included the increased rake of the radiator grille to give the car a more streamlined appearance. Škoda continued to offer a two-door saloon, two-door four-seat convertible, two-seat convertible roadster and commercial van versions, and enlarged the range with a four-door saloon with suicide doors.

From 1934 to 1937 Škoda built 4,200 model 420 Populars. They included 330 two-door convertibles made in 1936–37 for the Czechoslovak Army.

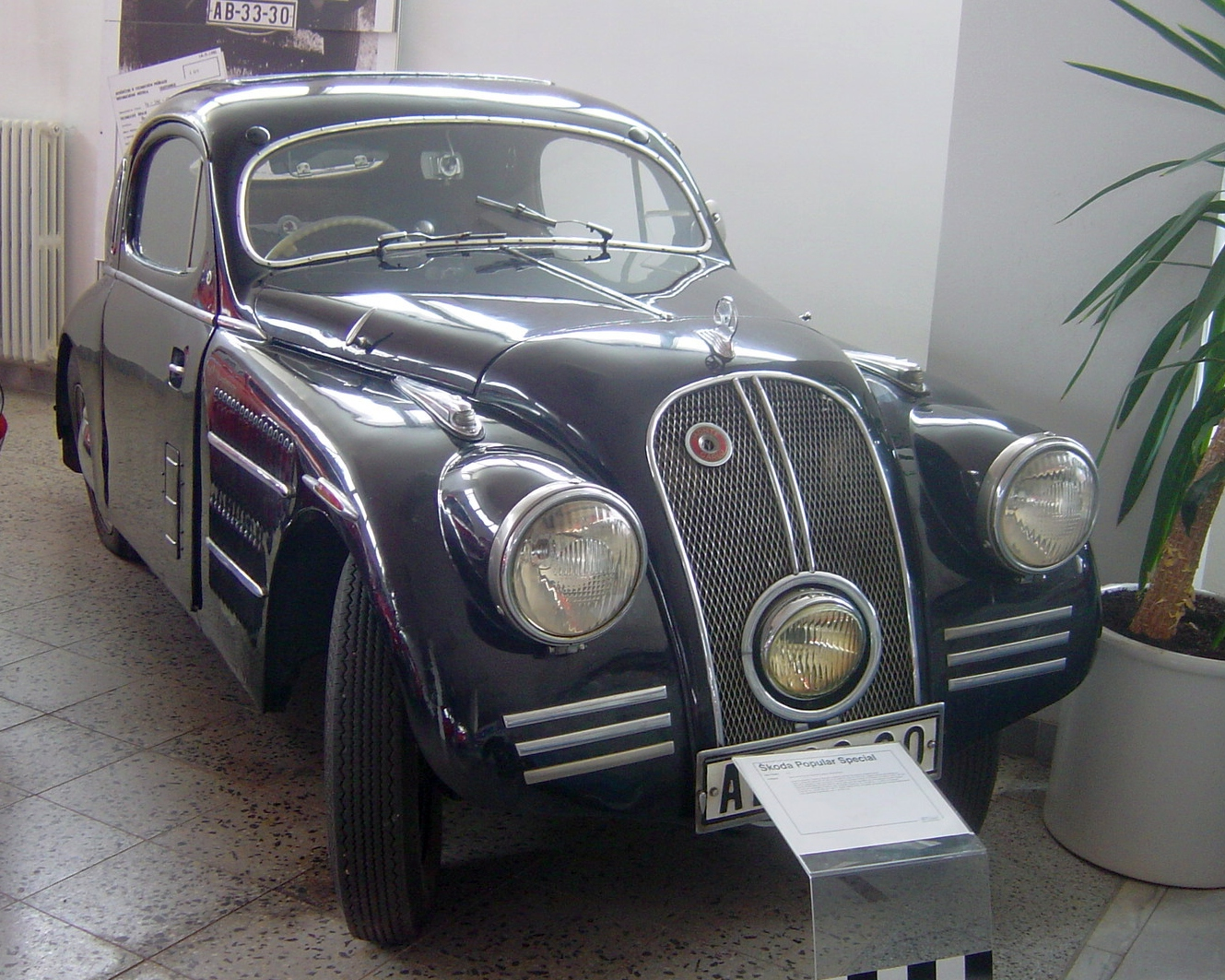
Škoda 420 Popular Special Sport

In 1934 Škoda launched the Popular Special Sport, which was an enclosed two-seater. Its engine was the standard 995 cc size but with its output increased to 26 horsepower (19 kW). It had a revised, streamlined body with a curved radiator grille and swept, fastback rear. From 1936 its name was shortened to Popular Special.

In January 1936 Zdeněk Pohl and Jaroslav Hausman drove a Popular in the Monte Carlo Rally, coming second in the 1,500 cc class. Škoda launched a Popular Monte Carlo model with a 1,386 cc, 31 horsepower (23 kW) Škoda Rapid engine and ATE-Lockheed brakes. Its chassis was wider but had the shorter 2,300 mm wheelbase. It was offered in enclosed or convertible Roadster, Roadster de Luxe and Coupé Sport versions. King Peter II of Yugoslavia had a two-door convertible.

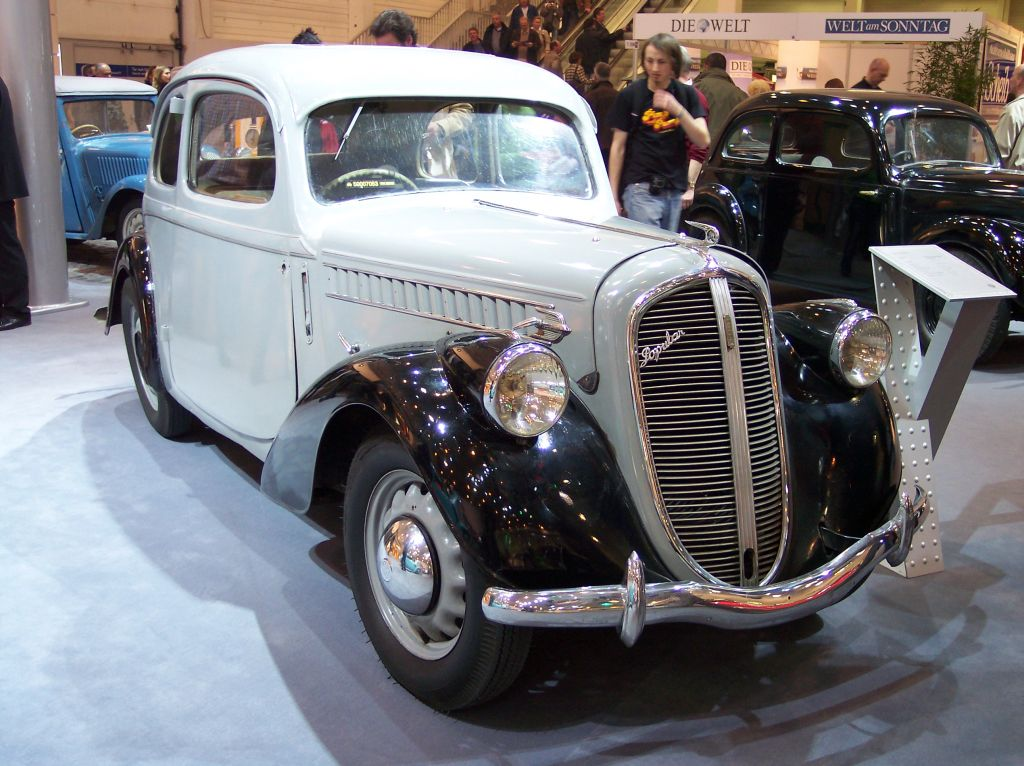
Škoda Popular OHV

In 1937 Škoda applied overhead valves to the 995 cc engine to create the Popular OHV model. This produced 27 horsepower (20 kW) and had a top speed of 100 kilometres per hour (62 mph) but was as economical as the sidevalve. Wheelbase was slightly increased to 2,440 mm. The Popular OHV was produced until 1938 and a total of 5,500 were made.

In 1938 Škoda enlarged the OHV engine to 1,089 cc, which increased its power to 30 horsepower (22 kW). The Popular 1100 OHV also had hydraulic brakes. Versions offered included a two-door four-seat saloon, two-door four-seat convertible, a two-seat convertible roadster, a commercial van and an ambulance. Production continued until 1946 and a total of 6,600 were made.

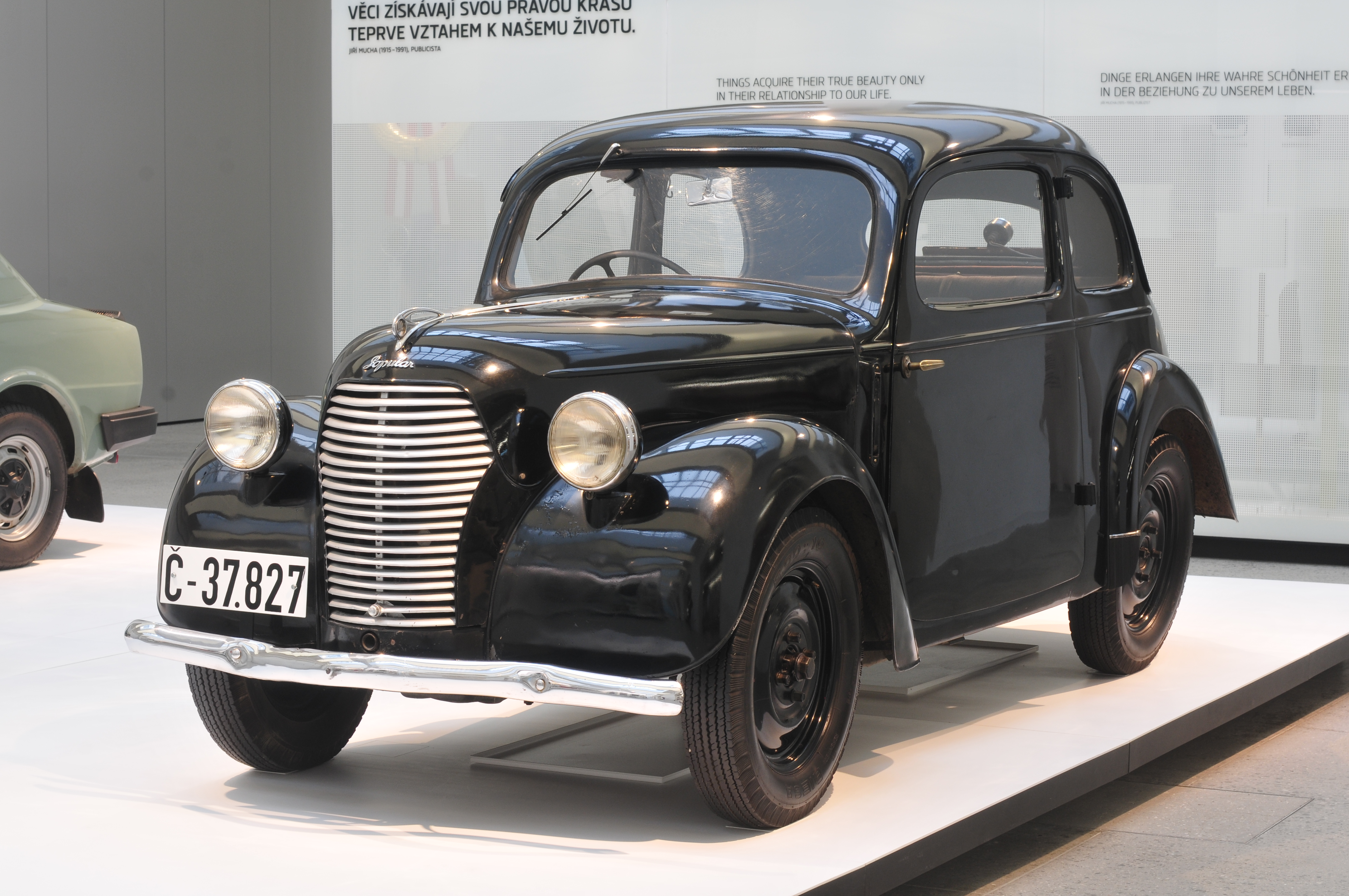
Škoda Popular 995 "Liduška"

In 1939 Škoda revised the body of the 995 cc model and called it the Popular 995 "Liduška". The radiator grille is more curved but also more upright. Versions offered included a two-door saloon, commercial van and an ambulance. The model was produced until 1946 and a total of 1,500 were made.

In 1940 Škoda gave the 1,089 cc model the same body as the 995 "Liduška", increased its power to 32 horsepower (24 kW) and called it the Popular 1101. Versions included a two-door convertible for the Royal Hungarian Army. Production continued until 1944 and a total of 1,019 were made.

After the Second World War Škoda revised the body of the Popular 1101 to create its successor model, the Škoda 1101/1102 "Tudor".

== Specifications ==
Model	Type	Production years	Units made	Engine	Horse- power	Top speed	Avg. L/100km	Length	Width	Height	Weight
418 Popular	-	1934	200	902 cc I4 SV	18 horsepower (13 kW)	80 km/h (50 mph)	7	3,630 mm (142.9 in)	1,340 mm (52.8 in)	1,520 mm (59.8 in)	650 kg (1,430 lb)
420 Popular	906, 916	1934–37	4,220	995 cc I4 SV	22 horsepower (16 kW)	90 km/h (56 mph)	7.5	3,770 mm (148.4 in)	1,360 mm (53.5 in)	1,500 mm (59.1 in)	750 kg (1,650 lb)
Popular OHV	912	1937–38	5,510	995 cc I4 OHV	27 horsepower (20 kW)	100 km/h (62 mph)	8	4,000 mm (157.5 in)	1,410 mm (55.5 in)	1,520 mm (59.8 in)	780 kg (1,720 lb)
Popular 1100 OHV	927	1938–46	6,600	1089 cc I4 OHV	30 horsepower (22 kW)	105 km/h (65 mph)	8,5	4,020 mm (158.3 in)	1,480 mm (58.3 in)	1,520 mm (59.8 in)	850 kg (1,870 lb)
Popular 1101	938	1940–44	1,019	1089 cc I4 OHV	32 horsepower (24 kW)	110 km/h (68 mph)	8,5	4,000 mm (157.5 in)	1,500 mm (59.1 in)	1,520 mm (59.8 in)	920 kg (2,030 lb)
Popular 995; Liduška	937	1939–46	1,500	995 cc I4 SV	22 horsepower (16 kW)	85 km/h (53 mph)	7,5	3,800 mm (149.6 in)	1,400 mm (55.1 in)	1,480 mm (58.3 in)	750 kg (1,650 lb)

== Sources ==
- Cedrych, Mario; Nachtmann, Lukáš (2007). Škoda: auta známá i neznámá (in Czech). Prague: Grada Publishing. pp. 63–70. ISBN 978-80-247-1719-7.
- Králík, Jan (2008). V soukolí okřídleného šípu (in Czech). Prague: Grada Publishing. pp. 19–22. ISBN 978-80-271-0177-1.
- Tuček, Jan (2017). Auta první republiky 1918–1938 (in Czech). Prague: Grada Publishing. ISBN 978-80-271-0466-6.
