= List of highways numbered 637 =

The following highways are numbered 637:

== Canada ==
- Ontario Highway 637
- Saskatchewan Highway 637

== Ireland ==
- R637 road (Ireland)

== United States ==
- Route 637 (Connecticut)
- Kentucky Route 637
- LA 637, Louisiana
  - LA 637-1
  - LA 637-2
  - LA 637-3
  - LA 637-4
  - LA 637-5
  - LA 637-6
- MD 637, Maryland
- County Route 637 (Atlantic County, New Jersey)
- County Route 637 (Burlington County, New Jersey)
- County Route 637 (Camden County, New Jersey)
- County Route 637 (Cape May County, New Jersey)
- County Route 637 (Cumberland County, New Jersey)
- County Route 637 (Essex County, New Jersey)
- County Route 637 (Gloucester County, New Jersey)
- County Route 637 (Hudson County, New Jersey)
- County Route 637 (Mercer County, New Jersey)
- County Route 637 (Morris County, New Jersey)
- County Route 637 (Ocean County, New Jersey)
- County Route 637 (Passaic County, New Jersey)
- County Route 637 (Salem County, New Jersey)
- County Route 637 (Somerset County, New Jersey)
- County Route 637 (Sussex County, New Jersey)
- County Route 637 (Union County, New Jersey)
- County Route 637 (Warren County, New Jersey)
- SR 637, Ohio
- PR-637, Puerto Rico
- FM 637, Texas
- SR 637, Virginia

Preceded by 636	Lists of highways 637	Succeeded by 638
