= Type 637 tanker =

Naval Ship

History

PRC
- Status: Active

General characteristics
- Type: Tanker
- Displacement: 1,400 long tons (1,400 t)
- Length: 54 m (177 ft 2 in)
- Beam: 8 m (26 ft 3 in)
- Draught: 3.5 m (11 ft 6 in)
- Propulsion: 1 × marine diesel engines, 600 hp (447 kW); 1 shaft
- Speed: 12 knots (22 km/h; 14 mph)
- Complement: 35
- Sensors & processing systems: Navigation radar
- Electronic warfare & decoys: None
- Aircraft carried: None
- Aviation facilities: None

Type 637 tanker is a type of naval auxiliary ship currently in service with the People's Liberation Army Navy (PLAN). Originally designed as a type that is capable of transport both water and oil, these ships entered civilian service from 1981 onward, followed by military service, with the oiler version entered service with PLAN first (as of 2015).Type 637 tanker has received NATO reporting name Fuxiao class.

Type 637 tankers in PLAN service are designated by a combination of two Chinese characters followed by three-digit number. The second Chinese character is You (油), meaning oil in Chinese, because these ships are classified as oilers. The first Chinese character denotes which fleet the ship is service with, with East (Dong, 东) for East Sea Fleet, North (Bei, 北) for North Sea Fleet, and South (Nan, 南) for South Sea Fleet. However, the pennant numbers are subject to change due to changes of Chinese naval ships naming convention, or when units are transferred to different fleets. A unique visual cue that makes Type 637 readily identifiable and distinguished from other Chinese oilers is that its hull is strengthened with additional strips of metal that stretched along the freeboard. Type 637 oiler is capable of carrying three hundred tons of oil.

Type	NATO designation	Pennant No.	Name (English)	Name (Han 中文)	Commissioned	Displacement	Fleet	Status
Type 637 transport oil tanker (AOT)	Fuxiao class	Bei-You 567	North Oil 567	北油 567	?	1400 t	North Sea Fleet	Active
Type 637 transport oil tanker (AOT)	Fuxiao class	Dong-You 637	East Oil 637	东油 637	?	1400 t	North Sea Fleet	Active
Type 637 transport oil tanker (AOT)	Fuxiao class	Various	Various	Various	?	1400 t	?	Under construction
Type 637 water tanker (AWT)	Fuxiao class	Various	Various	?	?	1400 t	?	Under construction
