= Škoda Superb (1934–1949) =

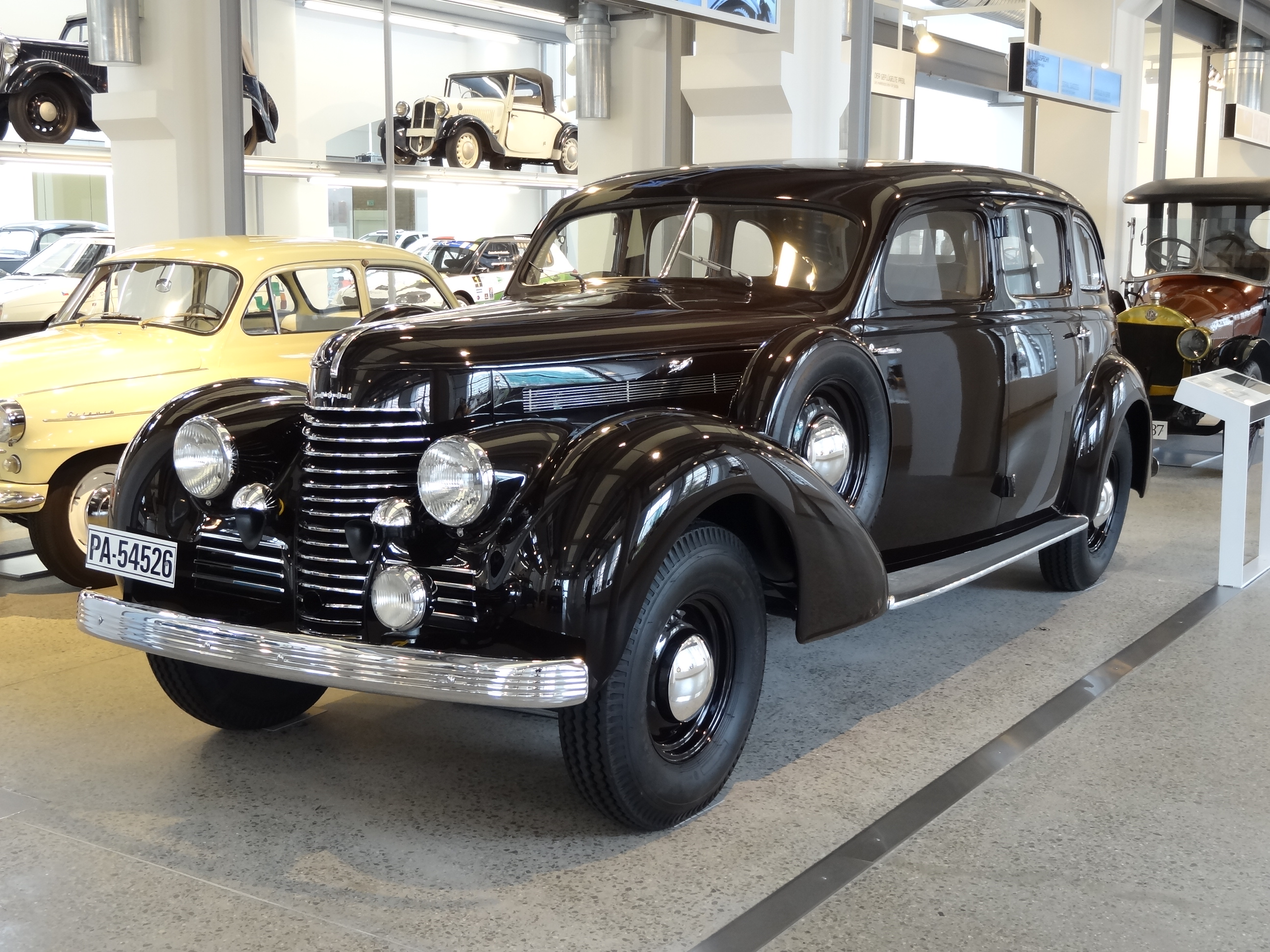
- 1940 Škoda Superb 4000

Overview
- Manufacturer: ASAP/AZNP
- Production: 1934–1943; 1946–1949
- Assembly: Mladá Boleslav, Czechoslovakia
- Designer: Vladimír Matouš

Body and chassis
- Class: Full-size luxury car (F)
- Body style: 4-door saloon 2-door cabriolet 4-door limousine
- Layout: Front-engine, rear-wheel-drive Front-engine, all-wheel-drive (Type 956)

Powertrain
- Engine: 2.5 L SV I6; 2.7 L SV I6; 2.9 L SV I6; 3.1 L OHV I6; 4.0 L OHV V8
- Transmission: 3-speed manual 4-speed manual

The original Škoda Superb is a full size luxury car that was made by the Czechoslovak car manufacturer ASAP, later AZNP from 1934 to 1949. It was the company's first car with a V8 engine and all-wheel drive. After 1949, Skoda's luxury car became the even larger and heavier Škoda VOS.

In 2001, Škoda revived the Superb model name for an unrelated model based on the Volkswagen Passat.

== Background ==
ASAP introduced a new range of cars in 1930s that significantly differed from its previous products. A new design of chassis with backbone tube and all-round independent suspension was developed under the leadership of chief engineer Vladimír Matouš and derived from the one introduced by Hans Ledwinka at Tatra. First used on the 420 Standard in 1933, it aimed to solve the problem of insufficient torsional stiffness that was inherent with a ladder frame.

The backbone chassis was the basis for the Popular, Rapid, Favorit and Superb models. While in 1933 Škoda had a 14% share of the Czechoslovak car market, behind both Praga and Tatra, the company's new models helped it to become a market leader by 1936, with a 39% share in 1938.

The Superb was introduced in 1934, at the time being Škoda's second highest model range after (probably due to currency fluctuations, as 860 was obviously a more expensive class than 650) the 650 (which was discontinued the same year) and it cost about double the price of a Rapid. The Superb was a replacement for the 860, a luxury 4-door limousine with a straight-eight engine that had been built between 1929 and 1932.

== Design ==
The central supporting tube was split at the front, which allowed the engine and gearbox to be attached. The drive shaft was located inside the tube, and transmitted the engine's power to the rear wheels. The Superb utilized leaf springs for its suspension; one at the front and two at the rear. It featured hydraulically-operated drum brakes, with a mechanical handbrake connected to the rear wheels.

=== First and second generation (Type 640) ===
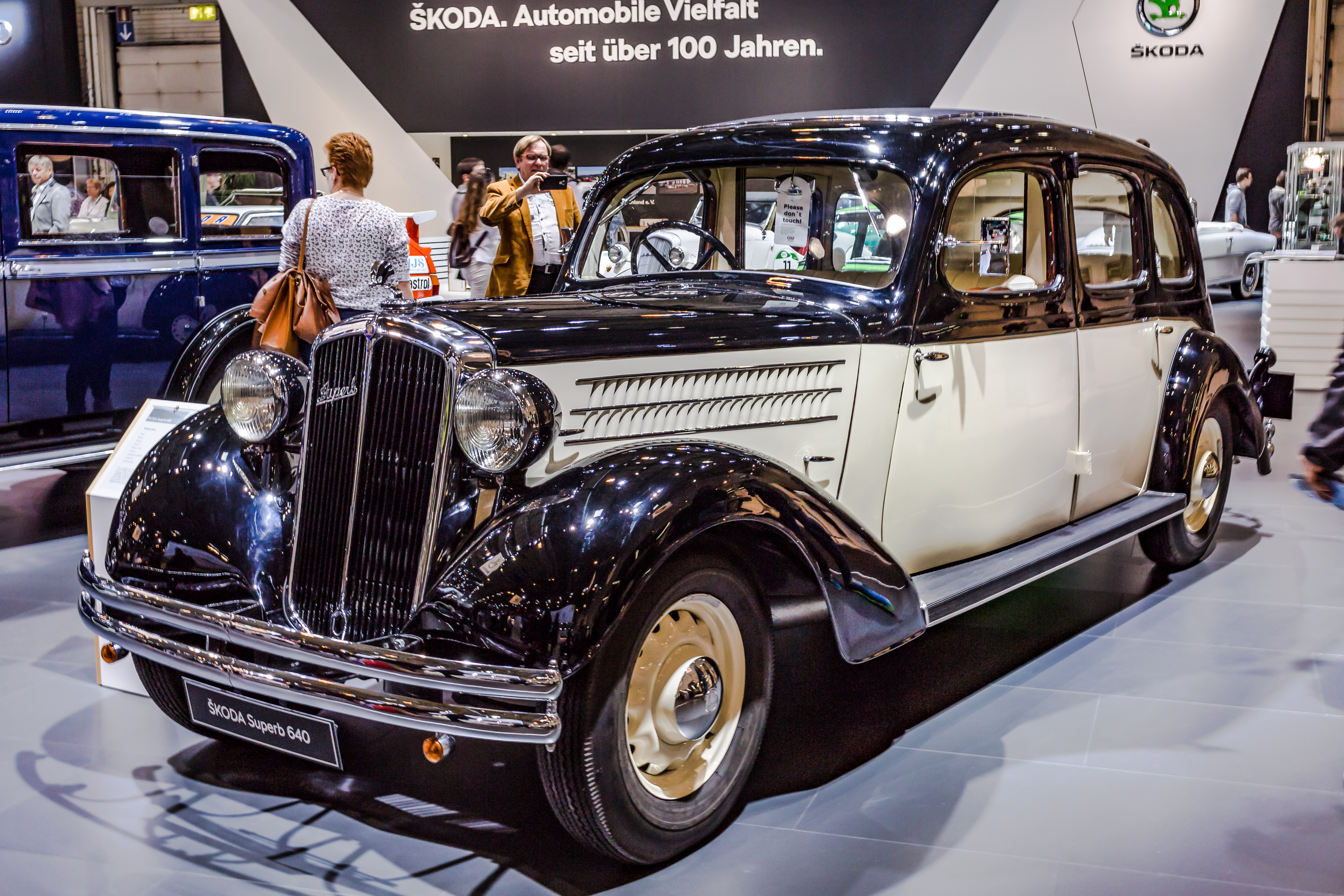
Škoda Superb 640

The first engine used in Superb was a straight-six flathead unit of 2,492 cc (152.1 cu in). It had a dry clutch and a four-speed manual gearbox with synchromesh on the 3rd and 4th gear. The car was offered with either 4 or 6 seats. The chassis weighed 1,130 kg (2,491 lb) and the whole car weighed 1,680 kg (3,704 lb), although this varied depending on the version of the car. Two different versions of this type were made.

=== Third generation (Type 902) ===
A new generation of Superb was introduced in May 1936 as the Type 902.

When Škoda introduced the Superb in 1934, one of its main Czechoslovak competitors, Tatra, had begun to manufacture the Type 77, with a V8 engine; this was the world's first serially produced aerodynamic car. In order to compete with this car, the Type 902 Superb had more rounded bodywork and featured frontal styling more reminiscent of the smaller Popular and Rapid models. The engine was enlarged to 2,703 cc (164.9 cu in), and it was combined with a new gearbox that had an aluminium case.

The Type 902 was available as 4 seat or 6 seat saloon, and as a 2-door cabriolet. Sodomka also produced a special version of the saloon that had a longer and more aerodynamic body.

=== Fourth generation (Type 913) ===
Another change came in October 1936, when the Superb Type 913 was introduced. The front of the car was redesigned and its flathead in-line six engine was enlarged again, this time to 2,914 cc (177.8 cu in).

The Type 913 was most commonly available in four basic versions: a 6- or 7-seat limousine, 5-seat saloon, and a 5-seat, 2-door saloon. Other less common versions included a luxury 2-door cabriolet, ambulance, panel van, and a pick-up truck. Production ended in February 1939. Some of the last cars to be produced used the bigger 3,140 cc (191.6 cu in) engine from the Type 924 prototype, which featured overhead valves for the first time, in place of the flathead arrangement used in the earlier engines.

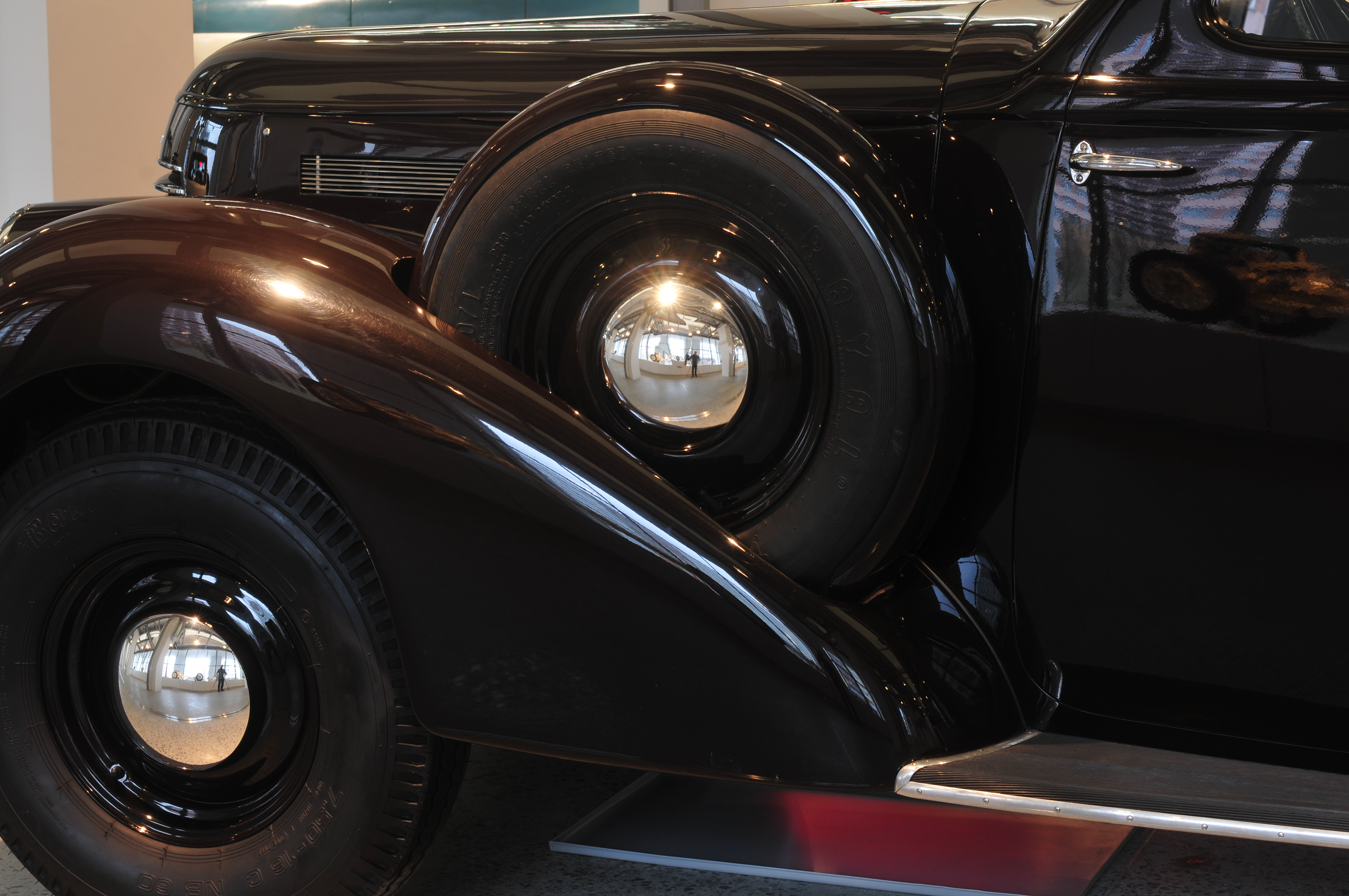
From 1939, the Superb had spare wheels placed behind the front mudguard instead of under the floor of the trunk.

=== Fifth generation ===
==== Type 924 ====
The first prototype of the Type 924 was built in 1937; however, it did not enter production until 1939. The Type 924 had a new 3,140 cc (191.6 cu in) overhead-valve straight-six engine, an extended wheelbase and shorter, more rounded bodywork. The 924 was characterized by having its spare-wheels located behind the front mudguards.

The most common version of the Type 924 was the 6-seat limousine. Its middle row of seats could be folded, allowing the passengers in the rear to have more space.

After the war, production of the Type 924 Superb continued in small numbers throughout 1947–48, with 60 saloons and 100 open-top cars made, some of them in a luxurious version intended for parades. Officially, they were all delivered to the Czechoslovak Ministry of Interior.

==== Types 952 and 956 ====
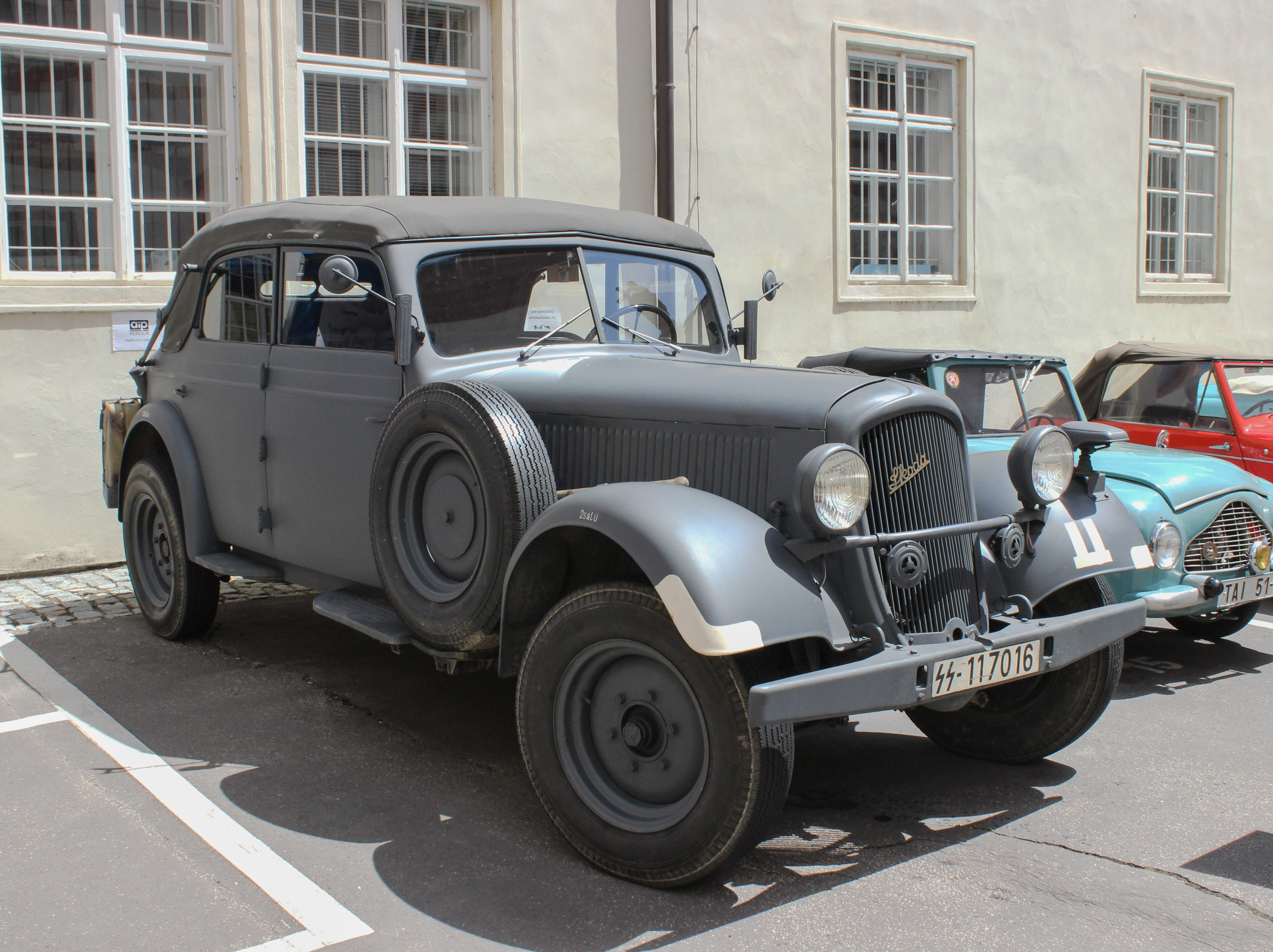
Škoda Superb 3000 type 952, Kfz. 21

Between 1941–1943, Škoda produced a military version of the Type 924 model for the Wehrmacht and its Nazi Allies. The production took place in then-Nazi-occupied Bohemia and began with a rear-wheel drive version called the Type 952 and culminated, briefly, with the all-wheel drive Type 956.

There were three military versions available: Kfz 21, a luxury command cabriolet used by high officers in the field such as General Heinz Guderian and Field Marshal Erwin Rommel (100 made), Kfz 15, a personnel-carrier and a raid car (1,600 were produced) and a military ambulance, of which 30 were produced.

=== Superb 4000 (Type 919) ===
In 1939, Škoda introduced the Type 919 version of the Superb, known as the Superb 4000; this had a new overhead-valve V8 engine of 3,990 cc (243.5 cu in), this model was extended in length to 5,700 mm (224.4 in), and was the company's first ever production car to utilize a V8 engine. Unlike the previous straight-six models, the V8 had three gears, with second and third gears having synchromesh fitted. Only twelve cars of this type were made.

Several historical Škoda Superb cars can be seen at the Škoda Auto Museum in Mladá Boleslav.

==== Specifications ====
Model	Type	Production years	Units made	Engine	Power	Top speed	Avg. L/100km	Length	Width	Height
Superb	640	1934–39	201	2.5 L I6 SV	55 hp (41 kW)	110 km/h (68 mph)	17	5,500 mm (216.5 in)	1,700 mm (66.9 in)	1,700 mm (66.9 in)
Superb	902	1936–37	53	2.7 L I6 SV	60 hp (45 kW)	115 km/h (71 mph)	17	5,500 mm (216.5 in)	1,700 mm (66.9 in)	1,700 mm (66.9 in)
Superb	913	1936–39	350	2.9 L I6 SV	65 hp (48 kW)	120 km/h (75 mph)	17	5,500 mm (216.5 in)	1,700 mm (66.9 in)	1,700 mm (66.9 in)
Superb 3000 OHV	924	1938–43; 1946–49	275	3.1 L I6 OHV	85 hp (63 kW)	125 km/h (78 mph)	18	5,200 mm (204.7 in)	1,760 mm (69.3 in) / 1,800 mm (70.9 in)	1,710 mm (67.3 in) / 1,720 mm (67.7 in)
Superb 3000	952; 956 4x4	1941–43; 1942–43	1626; 5	3.1 L I6 OHV	85 hp (63 kW)	100 km/h (62 mph); 90 km/h (56 mph)	18	4,800 mm (189.0 in)	1,800 mm (70.9 in)	1,720 mm (67.7 in)
Superb 4000	919	1939–40	12	4.0 L V8 OHV	96 hp (72 kW)	135 km/h (84 mph)	24	5,700 mm (224.4 in)	1,800 mm (70.9 in)	1,750 mm (68.9 in)

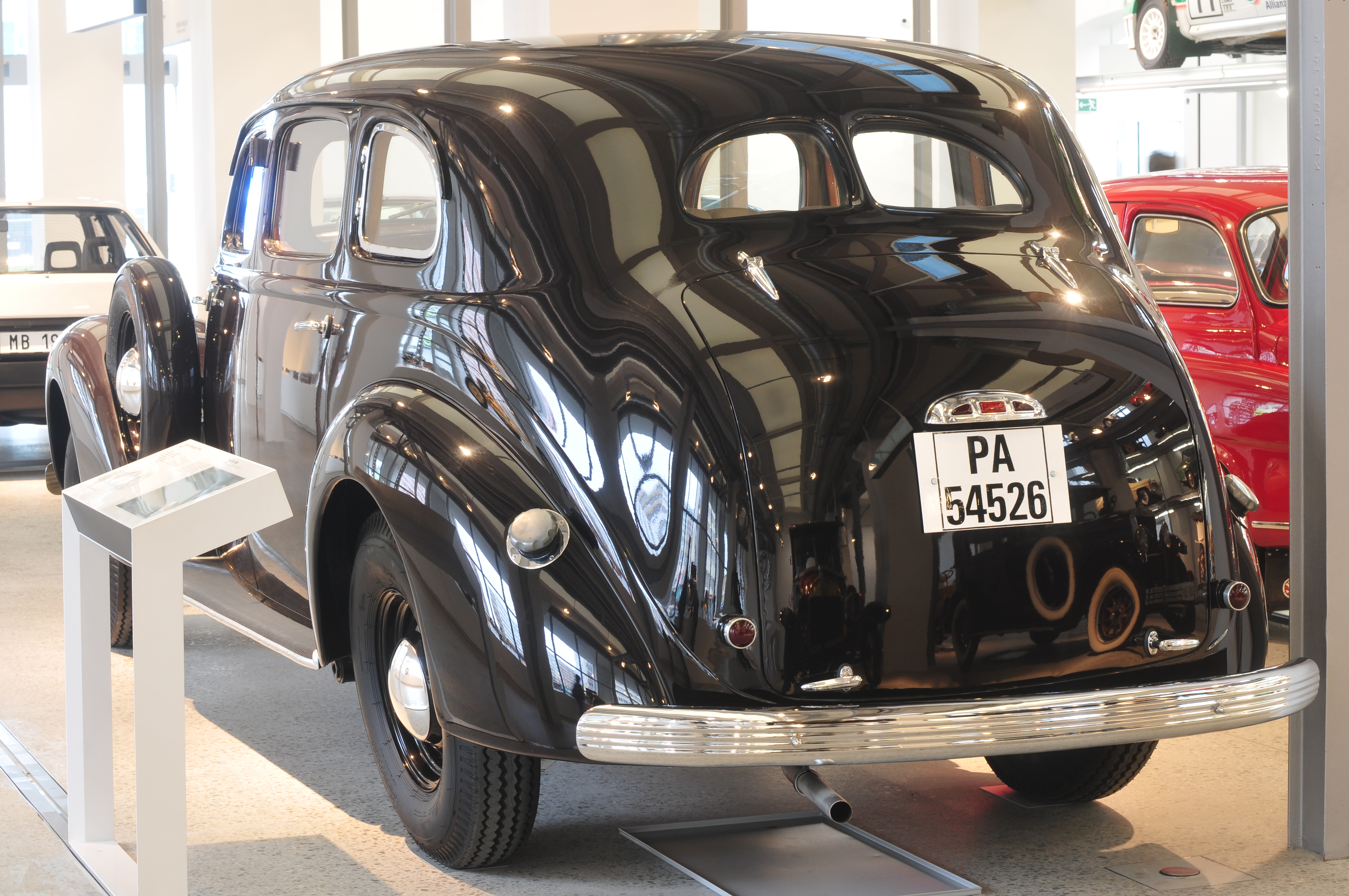
1939 Superb OHV rear view

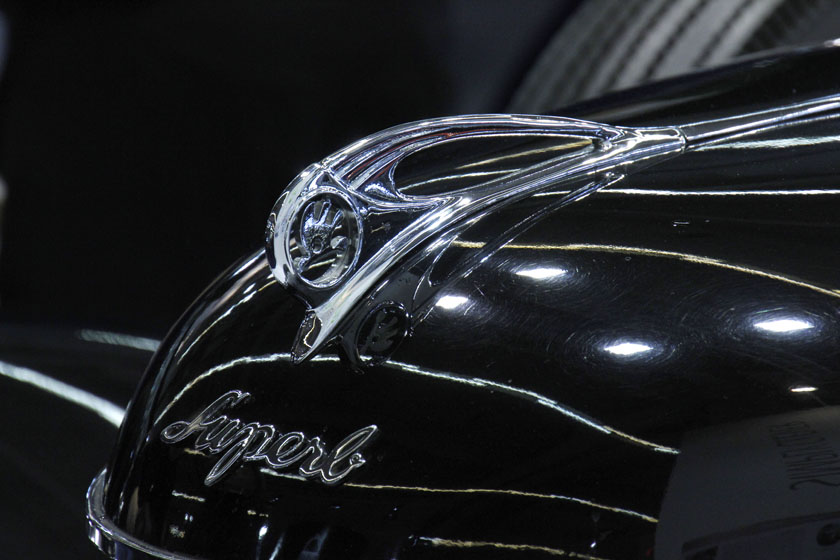
Škoda Superb emblem
