= Backbone chassis =

Automotive chassis based on a central structural tube

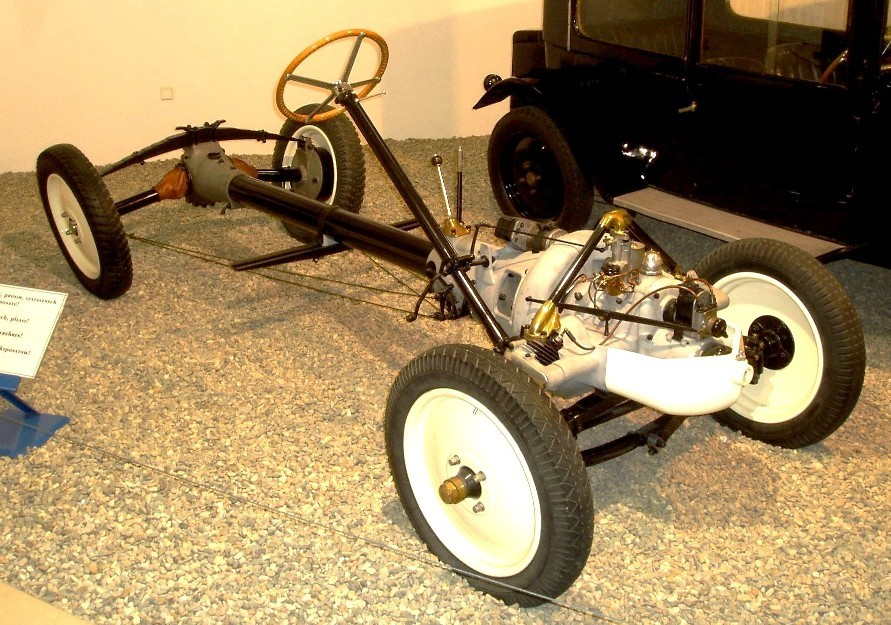
1923 Tatra 11 chassis

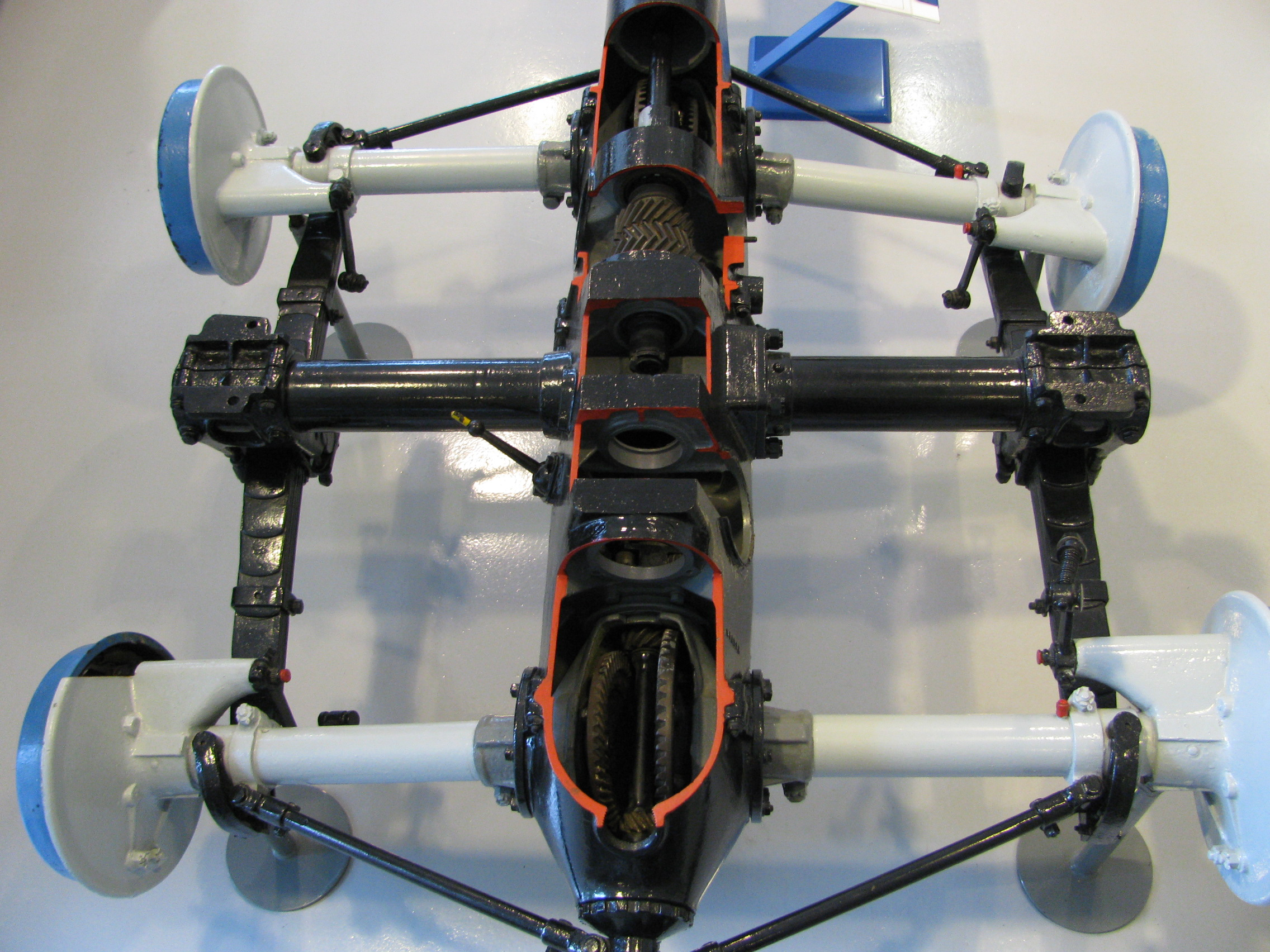
Cut through the rear axles of backbone chassis of Tatra 26

Backbone tube chassis is a type of automobile construction chassis that is similar to the body-on-frame design. Instead of a two-dimensional ladder-type structure, it consists of a strong tubular backbone (usually rectangular in cross section) that connects the front and rear suspension attachment areas. A body is then placed on this structure. It was first used in the English Rover 8hp of 1904 and then the French Simplicia automobile in 1909.

The backbone chassis was extensively developed by Hans Ledwinka who used it in greater numbers on the Tatra 11 and subsequent vehicles. Ledwinka later used backbone frames with central tubes and axles with swinging driveshafts on Tatra trucks, becoming known as Tatra-concept.

== Design ==
The truck backbone chassis is a design feature of Czech Tatra heavy trucks (cross-country, military etc.). Hans Ledwinka used this style of chassis for the Tatra 11 car in 1923. He then developed the design on trucks with 6x4 model Tatra 26, which had excellent off-road abilities.

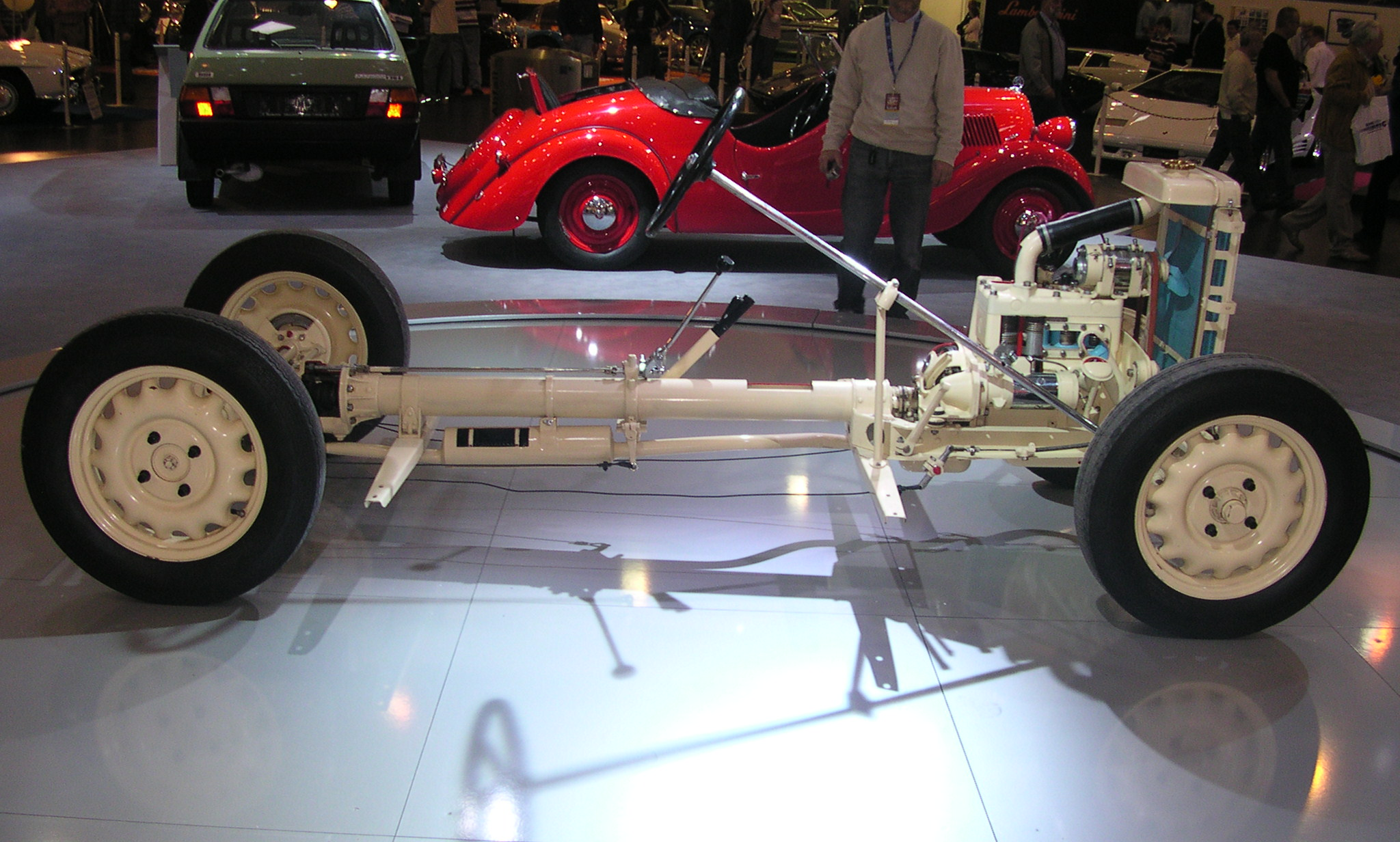
The chassis of a Škoda Popular (1934)

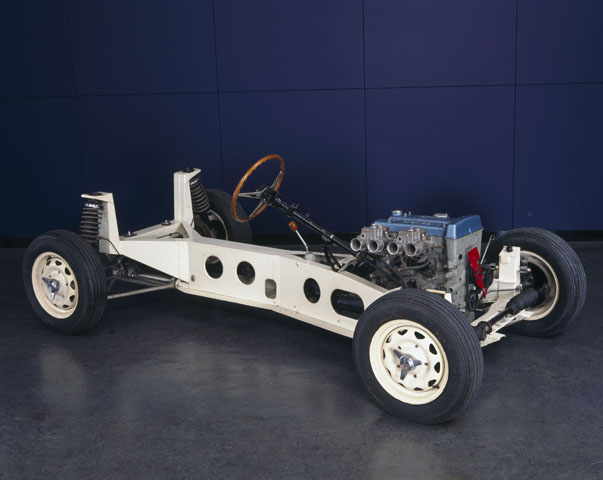
Lotus Elan chassis with rear Chapman strut suspension

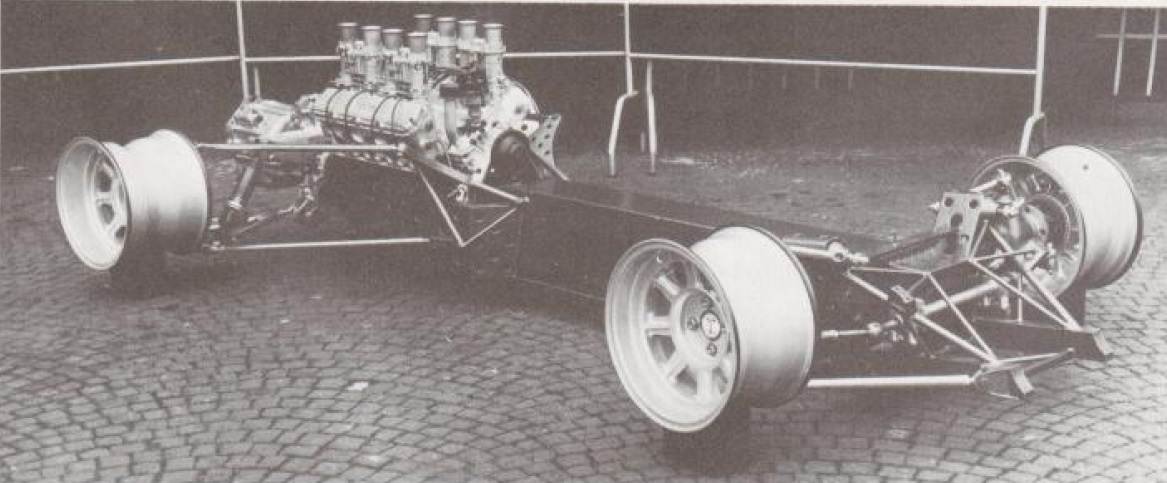
De Tomaso P70 racer backbone chassis and running gear. The same parts were later used in production De Tomaso Mangusta.

This type of chassis has been used in numerous sports cars. It does not protect against side collisions, and thus has to be combined with a body that would compensate for this shortcoming.

Examples of cars using a backbone chassis are Simplicia (1910), De Tomaso Mangusta, DMC DeLorean, Lloyd 600, Lotus Elan, Lotus Esprit and Europa, Škoda Popular, Škoda Rapid, Škoda Superb, Tatra 77, Tatra 87, Tatra 97, Toyota 2000GT and TVR S1. Trucks with a backbone chassis include the Tatra 111, Tatra 148 and Tatra 815. Some cars also use a backbone as a part of the chassis to strengthen it. Examples include the Volkswagen Beetle, where the transmission tunnel forms a backbone.

=== Hybrid backbone-ladder chassis ===
The Locost may appear to be using a backbone in addition to the outer space frame. However examination shows that, in standard form, it adds negligible stiffness and only serves as a convenient support structure for the sheet metal panels forming the transmission tunnel. The Triumph Herald and Triumph Vitesse used a twin flanged box section backbone carrying the main torsional and bending loads, with light channel section side rails to stiffen the body, while the Triumph Spitfire and Triumph GT6 sports cars used only the twin-box section backbone, with separate side members in the body, and rear suspension fore and aft loads were also taken by the floor, not the backbone chassis directly.

== Advantages ==
- A standard-conception truck's superstructure has to withstand the torsion twist, and subsequent wear reduces the vehicle's lifespan.
- The half-axles have better contact with the ground when operated off-road. This has little importance on roads.
- The vulnerable parts of the drive shaft are covered by a thick tube. The whole system is extremely reliable. However, if a problem occurs, repairs are more complicated.
- The modular system enables configurations of 2-, 3-, 4-, 5-, 6-, or 8-axle vehicles with various wheel bases.
- The lack of structure in the sills/rocker area allows deeper doors and a lower floor, useful in low-slung sportscars.

== Disadvantages ==
- Manufacturing the backbone chassis is more complicated and more costly. However, the more axles with all-wheel drive are needed, the more cost benefit turns in favor of backbone chassis.
- The backbone chassis is heavier for a given torsional stiffness than a uni-body.
- The chassis gives no protection against side impacts.

== See also ==
- Tatra concept
- Frame (vehicle)
- Body-on-frame
- Chassis
- Coachwork
- Monocoque
- Spaceframe
- Subframe
- Superleggera
- Swing axle
