= List of Škoda vehicles =

Škoda Auto has produced the following vehicles since its inception in 1895 (as Laurin & Klement before 1925).

== Current models ==
Vehicles exclusive to India

Model	Calendar year introduced	Current model		Platform	Vehicle description
Model	Calendar year introduced	Introduction	Update (facelift)	Platform	Vehicle description
Hatchback
Fabia	1999	2021	—	MQB A0	Supermini (B-segment) hatchback.
Scala	2019	2019	2023	MQB A0	Small family (C-segment) hatchback. Successor to the Rapid Spaceback.
Sedan/liftback
Slavia	2021	2021	2026	MQB A0 IN	Supermini (B-segment) sedan based on the Volkswagen Virtus.
Octavia	1996	2020	2024	MQB Evo	Small family sedan (C-segment). The best-selling nameplate of Škoda.
Superb	2001	2023	—	MQB Evo	Large family sedan (D-segment), flagship model of Škoda.
Station wagon
Octavia	1996	2020	2024	MQB Evo	Small family (C-segment) station wagon. The best-selling nameplate of Škoda.
Superb	2008	2023	—	MQB Evo	Large family (D-segment) station wagon, flagship model of Škoda.
Crossover SUV
Kylaq	2025	2025	—	MQB A0 IN	Subcompact (B-segment) crossover SUV for the Indian market.
Kushaq	2021	2021	2026	MQB A0 IN	Subcompact (B-segment) crossover SUV for the Indian market heavily based on the Volkswagen Taigun/T-Cross.
Epiq	2026	2026	—	MEB Entry	Battery electric subcompact crossover SUV;
Kamiq	2019	2019	2023	MQB A0	Subcompact (B-segment) crossover SUV.
Karoq	2017	2017	2021	MQB A1	Compact crossover SUV (C-segment) built above the MQB A1 platform. Related to the SEAT Ateca, Volkswagen Taos/Tharu, and Jetta VS5.
Elroq	2024	2024	—	MEB	Battery electric compact (C-segment) crossover SUV.
Enyaq	2020	2020	2025	MEB	Battery electric mid-size (D-segment) crossover SUV.
Enyaq	2022	2022	2025	MEB	Coupe SUV version of the Enyaq with a sloping rear roof line.
Kodiaq	2016	2023	—	MQB Evo	Three-row mid-size (D-segment) crossover SUV.
Peaq	2026	2026	—	MEB+	Battery electric mid-size (D-segment) crossover SUV.

== Historic models ==
=== 1900s ===
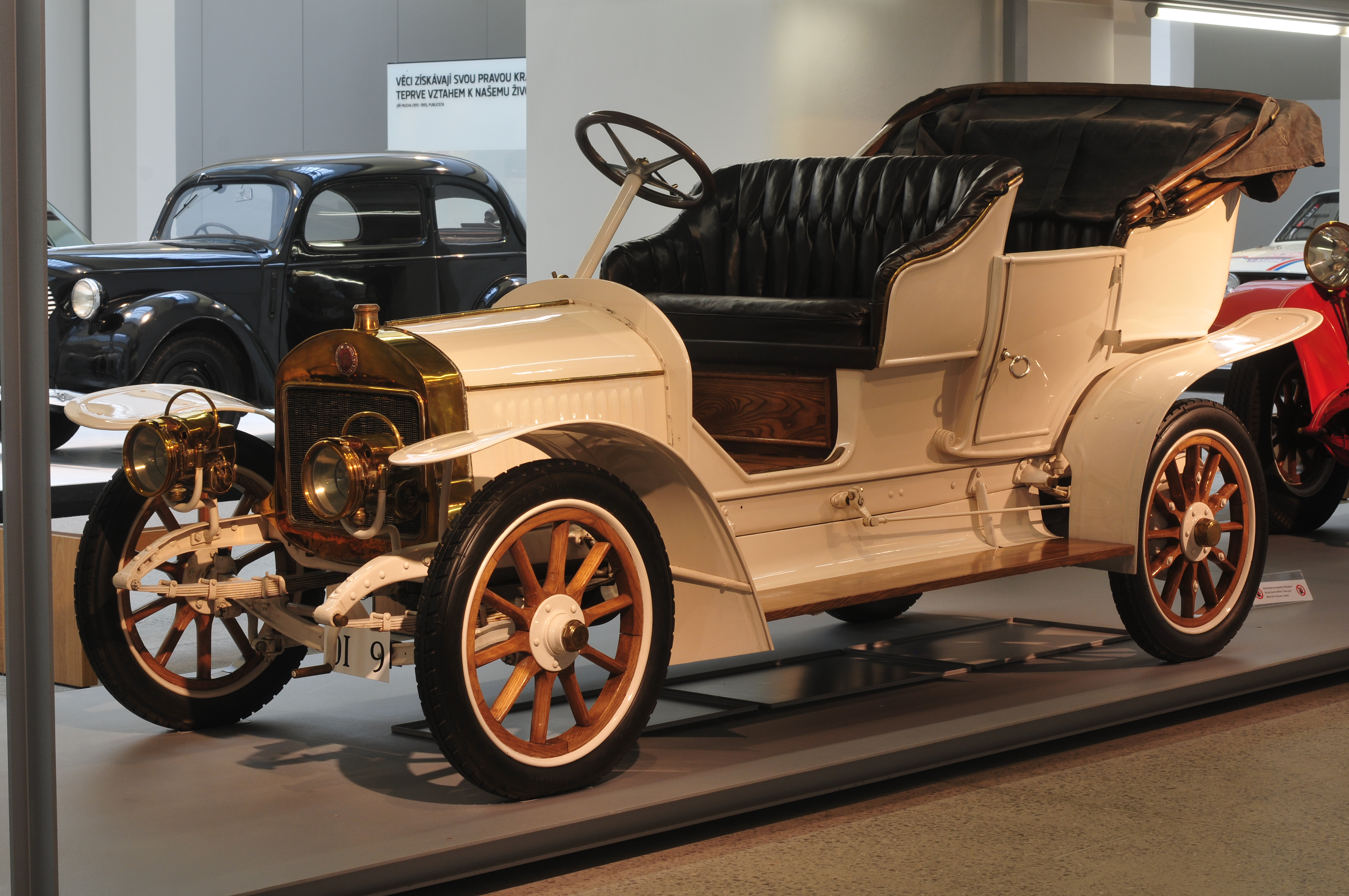
Laurin & Klement G

- Laurin & Klement A (1905–07)
- Laurin & Klement B (1906–08)
- Laurin & Klement C (1906–08)
- Laurin & Klement D (1906–07)
- Laurin & Klement E (1906–09)
- Laurin & Klement B2 (1907–08)
- Laurin & Klement C2 (1907–08)
- Laurin & Klement F (1907–09)
- Laurin & Klement FF (1907)
- Laurin & Klement FC (1907–09)
- Laurin & Klement HO/ HL/HLb (1907–13)
- Laurin & Klement BS (1908–09)
- Laurin & Klement FCS (1908–09)
- Laurin & Klement G (1908–11)
- Laurin & Klement DO/DL (1909–12)
- Laurin & Klement FDO/FDL (1909–15)
- Laurin & Klement EN (1909–10)
- Laurin & Klement FN/GDV/RC (1909–13)
- Laurin & Klement FCR (1909)
- Laurin & Klement L/LO (1909–11)

=== 1910s ===
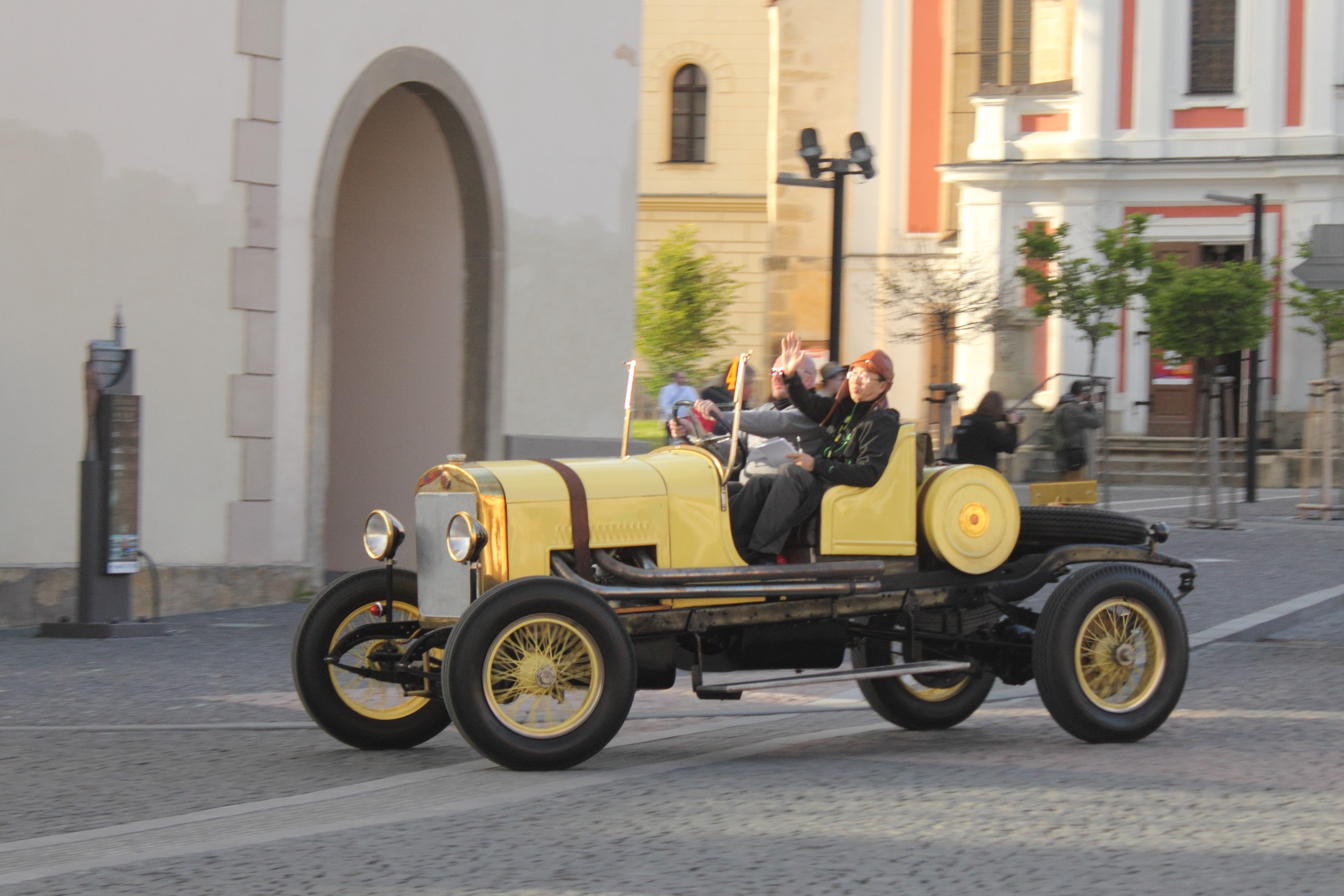
Laurin & Klement 300

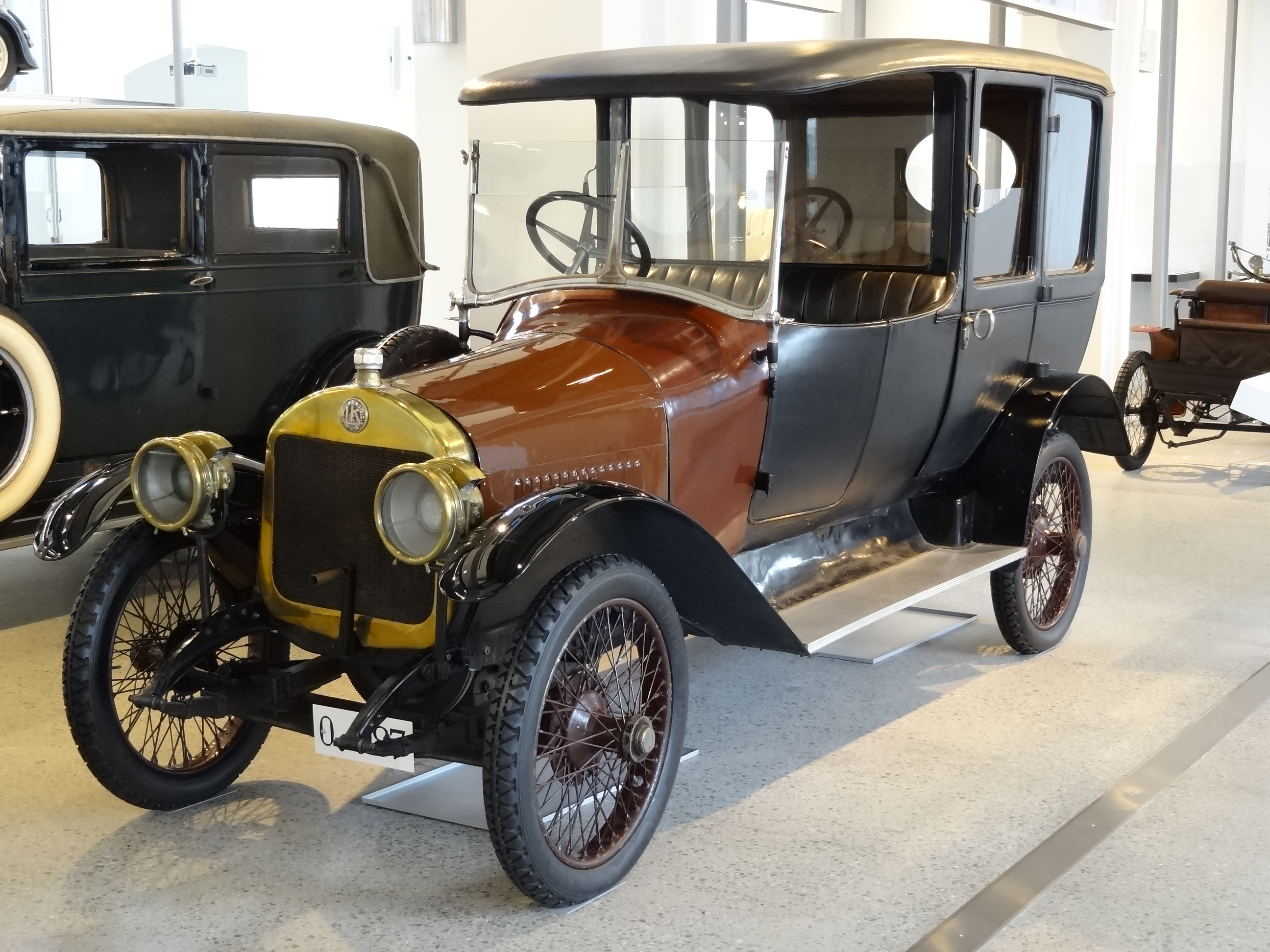
Laurin & Klement S

- Laurin & Klement ENS (1910–11)
- Laurin & Klement K/Kb/LOKb (1911–15)
- Laurin & Klement LK (1911–12)
- Laurin & Klement S/Sa (1911–16)
- Laurin & Klement DN (1912–15)
- Laurin & Klement RK (1912–16)
- Laurin & Klement Sb/Sc (1912–15)
- Laurin & Klement M/Mb/MO (1913–15)
- Laurin & Klement MK/400 (1913–24)
- Laurin & Klement O/OK (1913–16)
- Laurin & Klement Sd/Se/Sg/Sk (1913–17)
- Laurin & Klement Ms (1914–20)
- Laurin & Klement Sh/Sk (1914–17)
- Laurin & Klement T/Ta (1914–21)
- Laurin & Klement Si/Sl/Sm/So/200/205 (1916–24)
- Laurin & Klement Md/Me/Mf/Mg/Mh/Mi/Ml/300/305 (1917–23)

=== 1920s ===
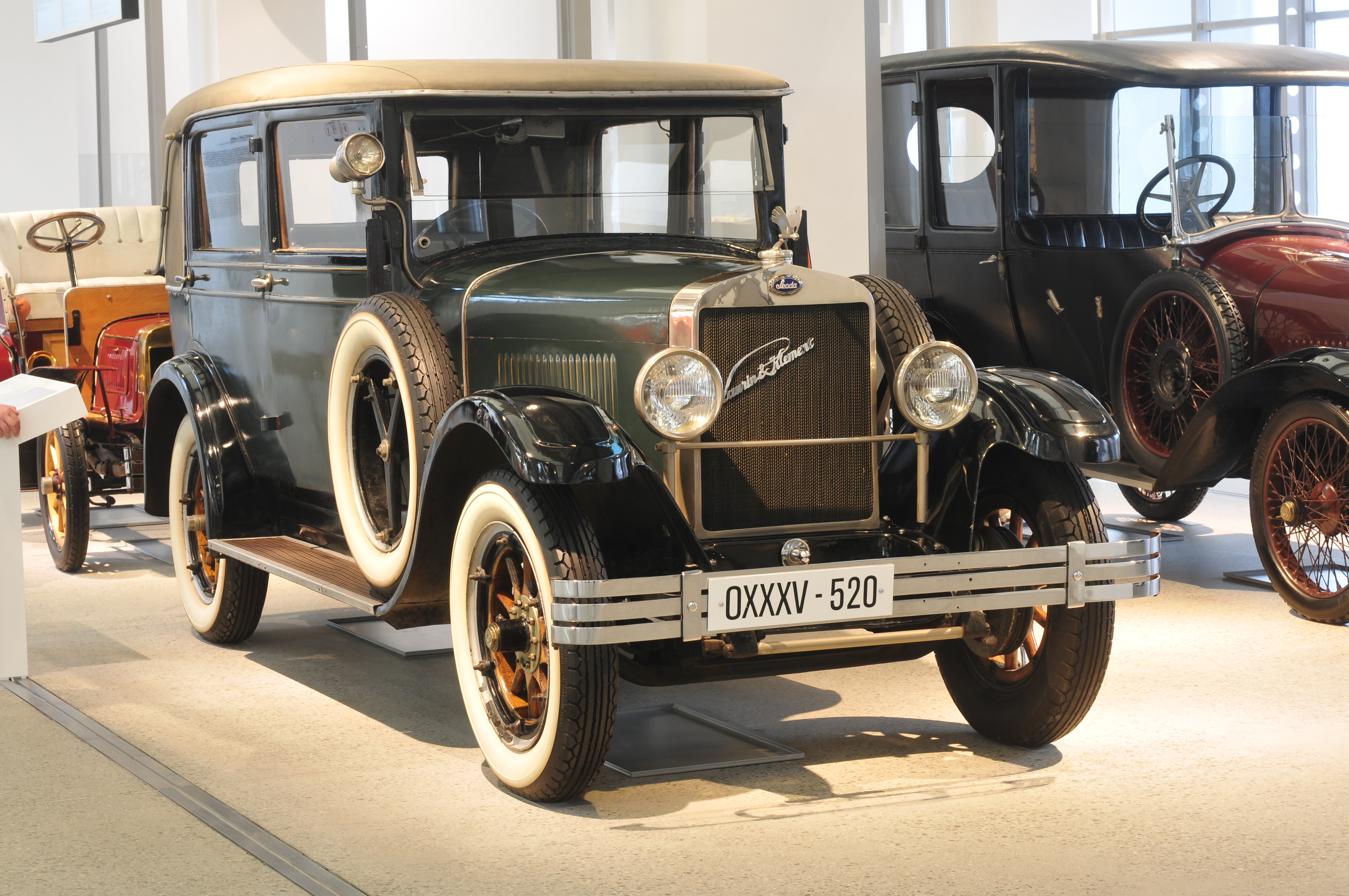
Laurin & Klement – Škoda 110 (1925)

- Laurin & Klement MS/540/545 (1920–23)
- Laurin & Klement Škoda 545 (1924–27)
- Škoda 422 (1929–32)
- Škoda 430 (1929–36)
- Škoda 645 (1929–34)
- Škoda 860 (1929–32)

=== 1930s ===
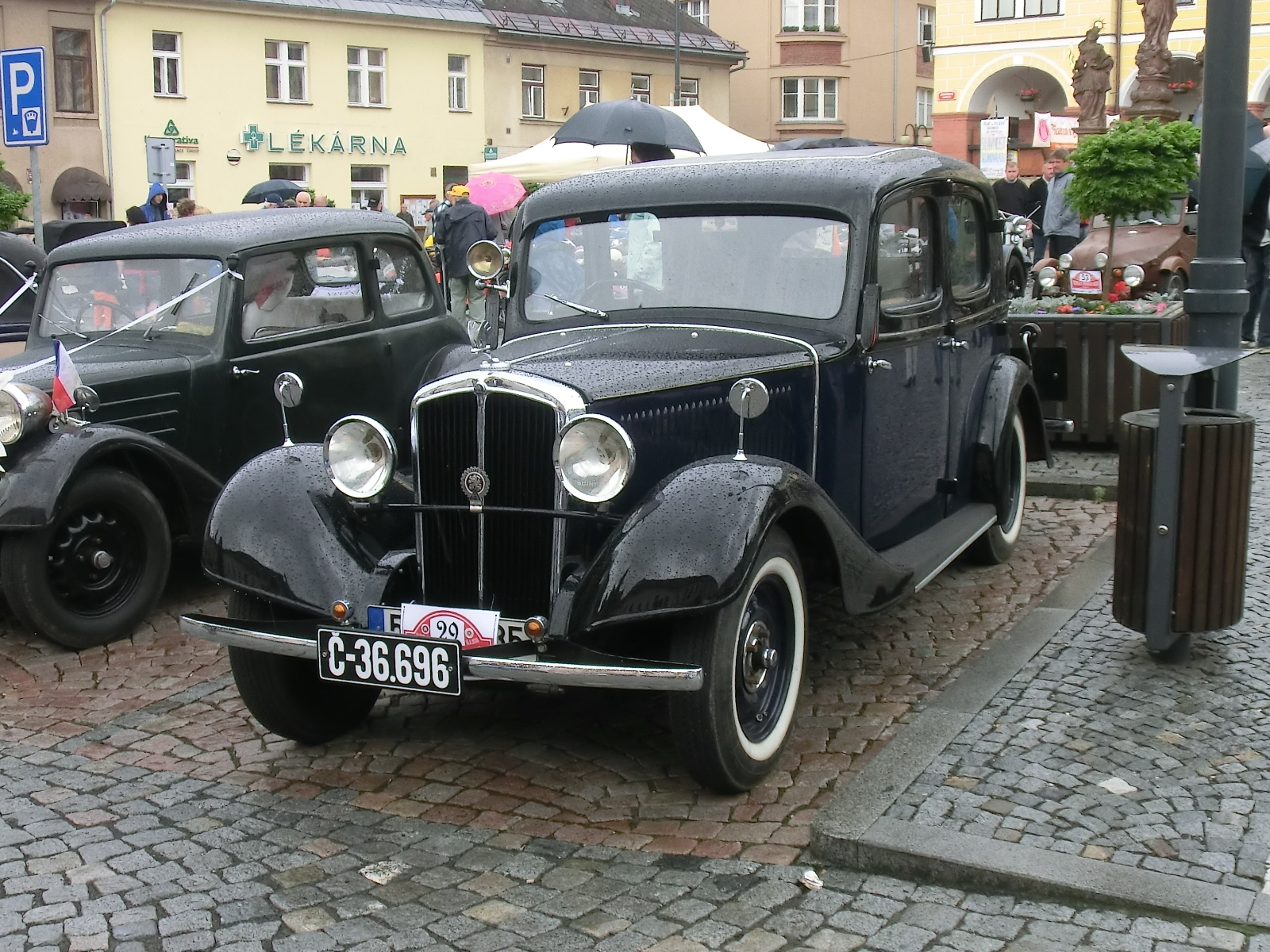
Škoda 633 (1933)

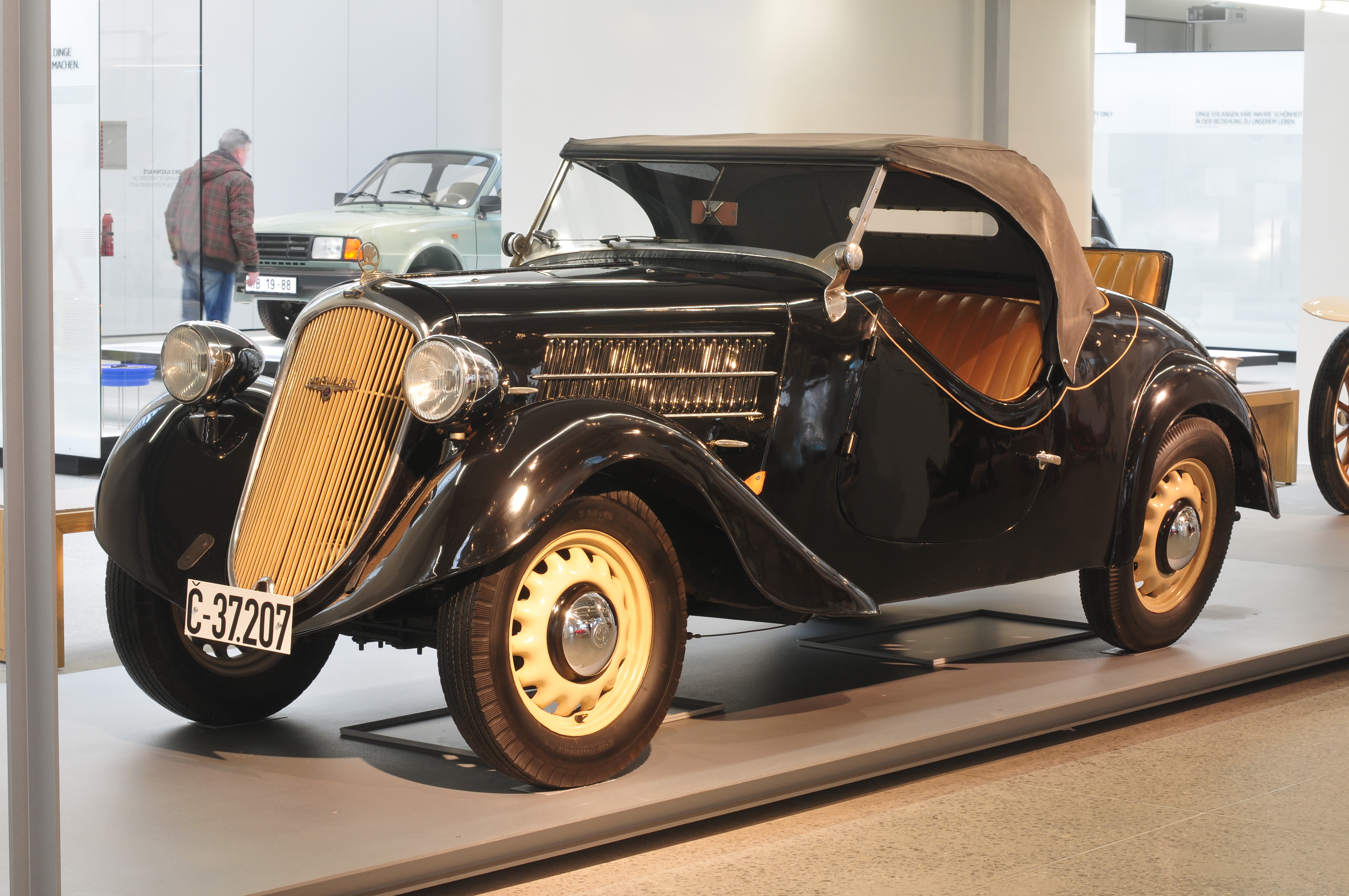
Škoda Popular (1934–44)

- Škoda 650 (1930–34)
- Škoda 633 (1931–34)
- Škoda 637 (1932–35)
- Škoda 932 (1932)
- Škoda 420 Standard/Rapid/Popular (1933–38)
- Škoda 935 Dynamic (1935, prototype only)
- Škoda Rapid (1935–47)
- Škoda Favorit (1936–41)
- Škoda Superb (1934–43)

=== 1940s ===
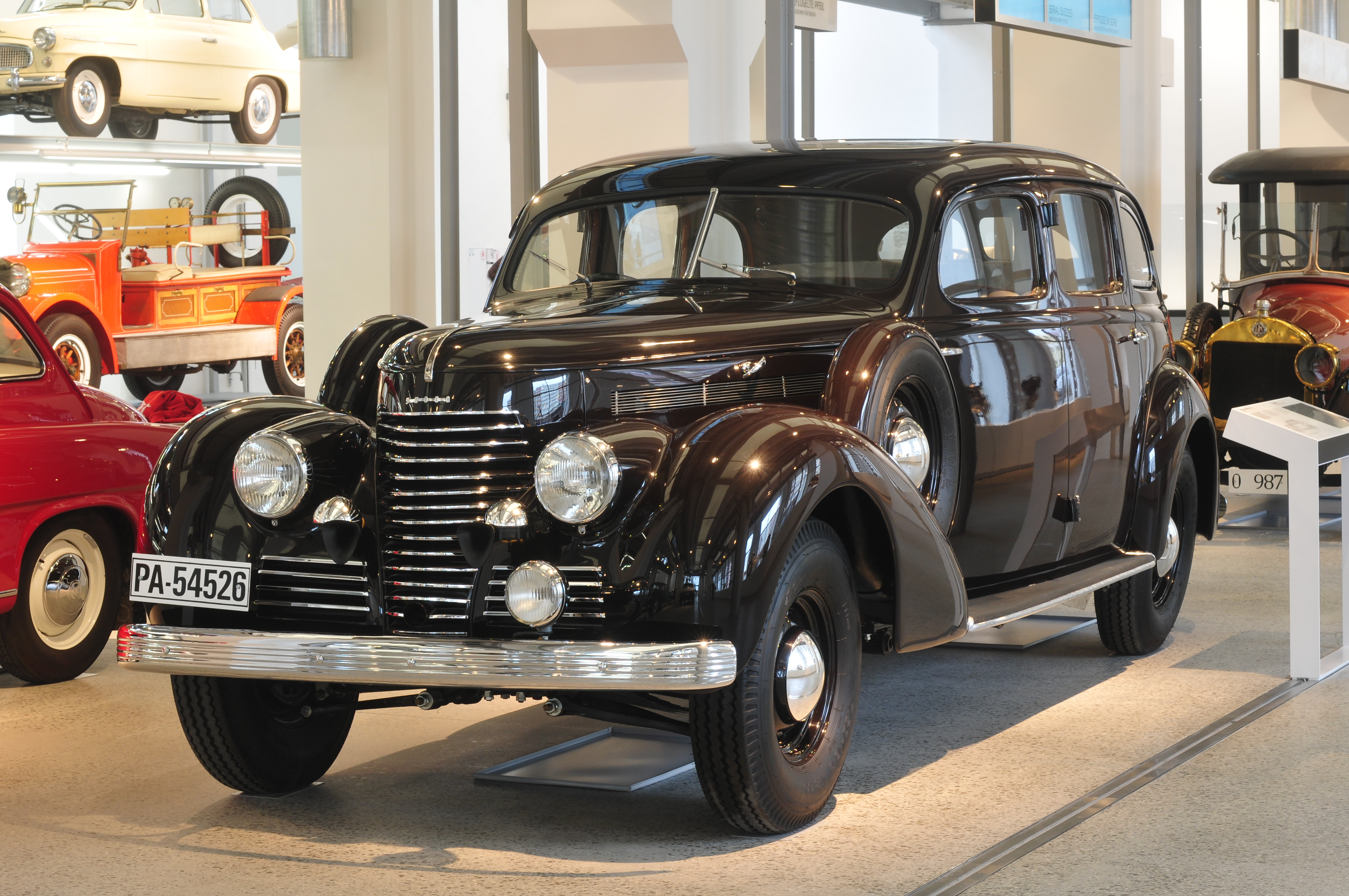
Škoda Superb (1940)

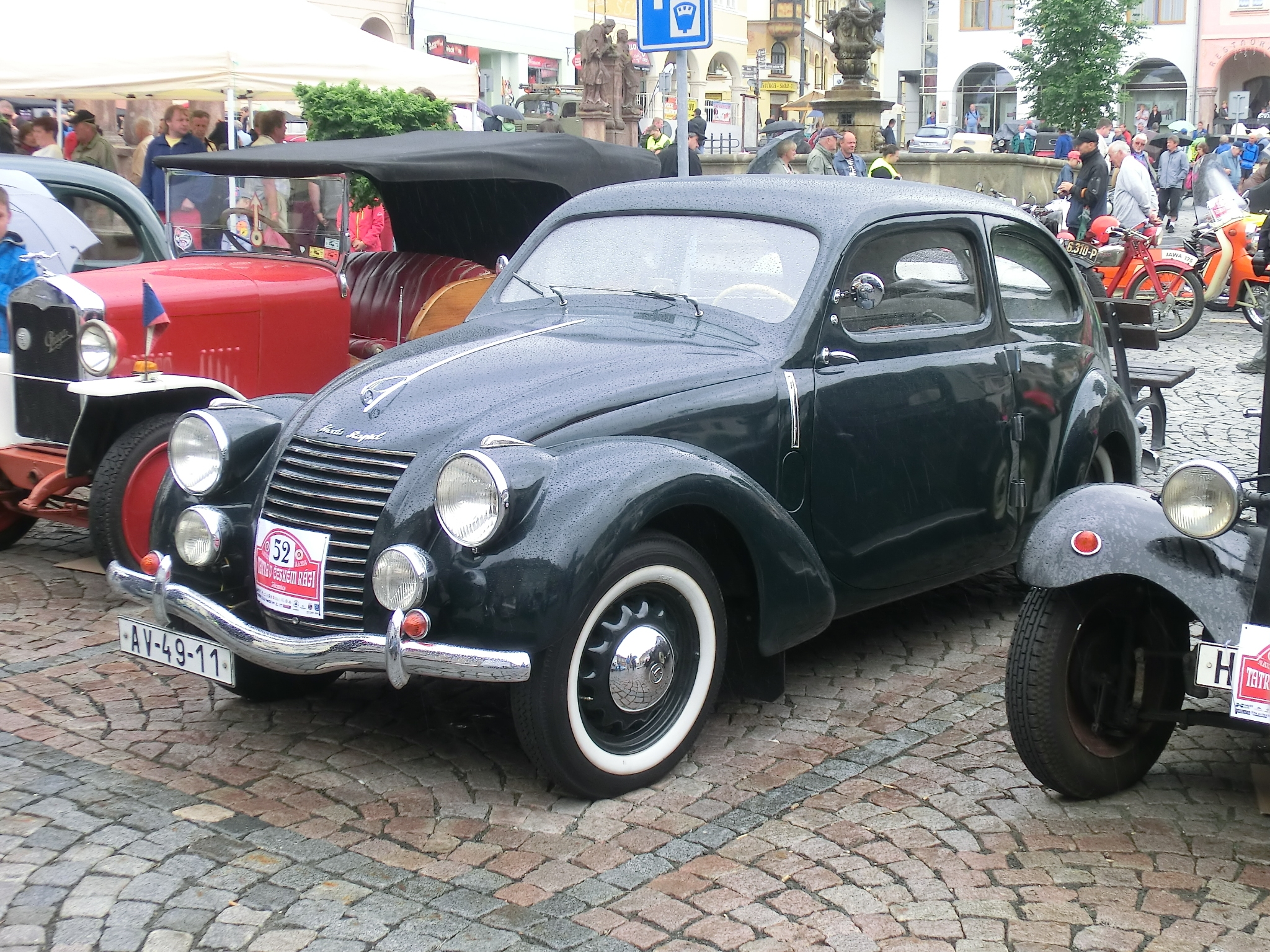
Škoda Rapid (1940)

- Škoda Superb OHV (1946–49)
- Škoda 1101 Tudor (1946–49)
- Škoda 1102 (1948–52)
- Škoda VOS (1949–52)

=== 1950s ===
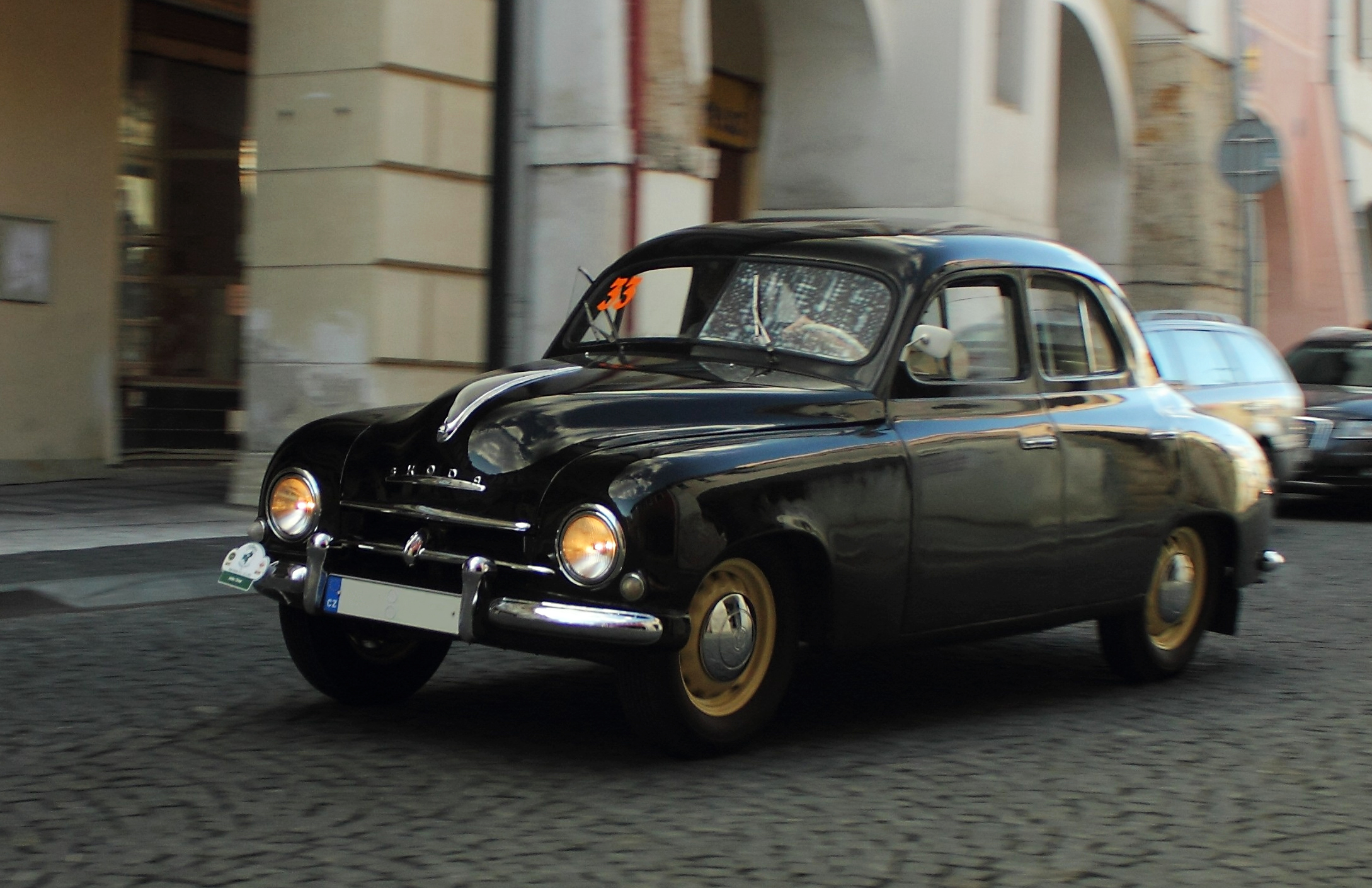
Škoda 1201 Sedan (1957)

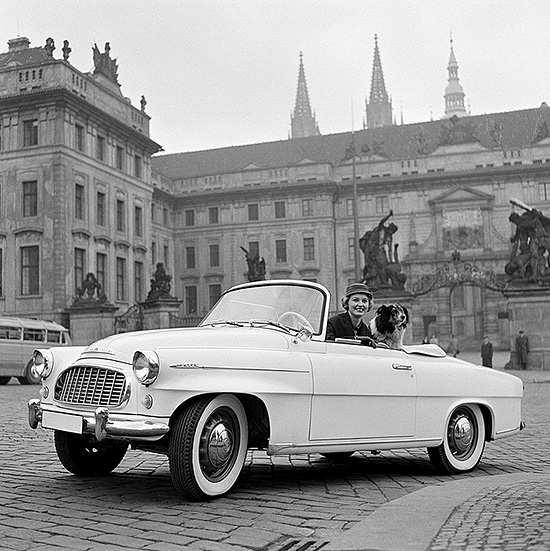
Škoda 450 (1957)

- Škoda 1200 (1952–55)
- Škoda 440/445/450 (1955–59)
- Škoda 1201 (1955–62)
- Škoda Felicia (1959–64)
- Škoda Octavia (1959–64)

=== 1960s ===
- Škoda 1202 (1961–73)
- Škoda Octavia Combi (1964–71)
- Škoda 1000 MB (1964–69)
- Škoda 1203 (1968–99)
- Škoda 100/110 (1969–77)

=== 1970s ===
- Škoda 110 R (1970–80)
- Škoda 105/120/125 (1976–90)

=== 1980s ===
- Škoda Garde/Rapid (1984–90)
- Škoda 130/135/136 (1984–90)
- Škoda Favorit/Forman/Pick-up (1987–95)

=== 1990s ===
- Škoda Felicia (1994–2001)

=== 2000s ===
- Škoda Roomster/Praktik – LAV (2006–2015)
- Škoda Yeti – Mini SUV (2009–2017)

=== 2010s ===
- Škoda Citigo (2011–2021)
- Škoda Rapid (India) (2011–2021)
- Škoda Rapid (2012) (2012–2023)
- Škoda Kamiq (China) (2018–2026)

== Concept cars ==
- 110 R (2025)
- Vision O (2025)
- L&K 130 (2025)
- Vision Gran Turismo (2024)
- Epiq (2024)
- Roadiaq (2023)
- Vision 7S (2022)
- Afriq (2022)
- Vision IN (2020)
- Slavia Cabrio (2020)
- Vision GT (2019)
- Vision iV (2019)
- Mountiaq (2019)
- Vision RS (2018)
- Vision X (2018)
- Sunroq (2018)
- Vision E EU (2017)
- Vision E China (2017)
- Element (2017)
- Vision S (2016)
- Atero (2016)
- Funstar (2015)
- CitiJet (2014)
- Vision C (2013)
- MissionL (2011)
- Vision D (2011)
- Fabia Super (2007)
- Joyster (2006)
- Yeti II (2006)
- Roomster (2003)
- Tudor (2002)
- Fabia Paris Edition (2002)
- Ahoj (2002)
- Felicia Golden Prague (1998)
- 783 Favorit Coupé (1987)
- Škoda 110 Super Sport Ferat (1971)
- Škoda 1100 GT (1968)
- Škoda 720 (1967–1972)
- Škoda F3 (1964)
- Škoda 1100 Type 968 (1958)
- Škoda 973 Babeta (1949)
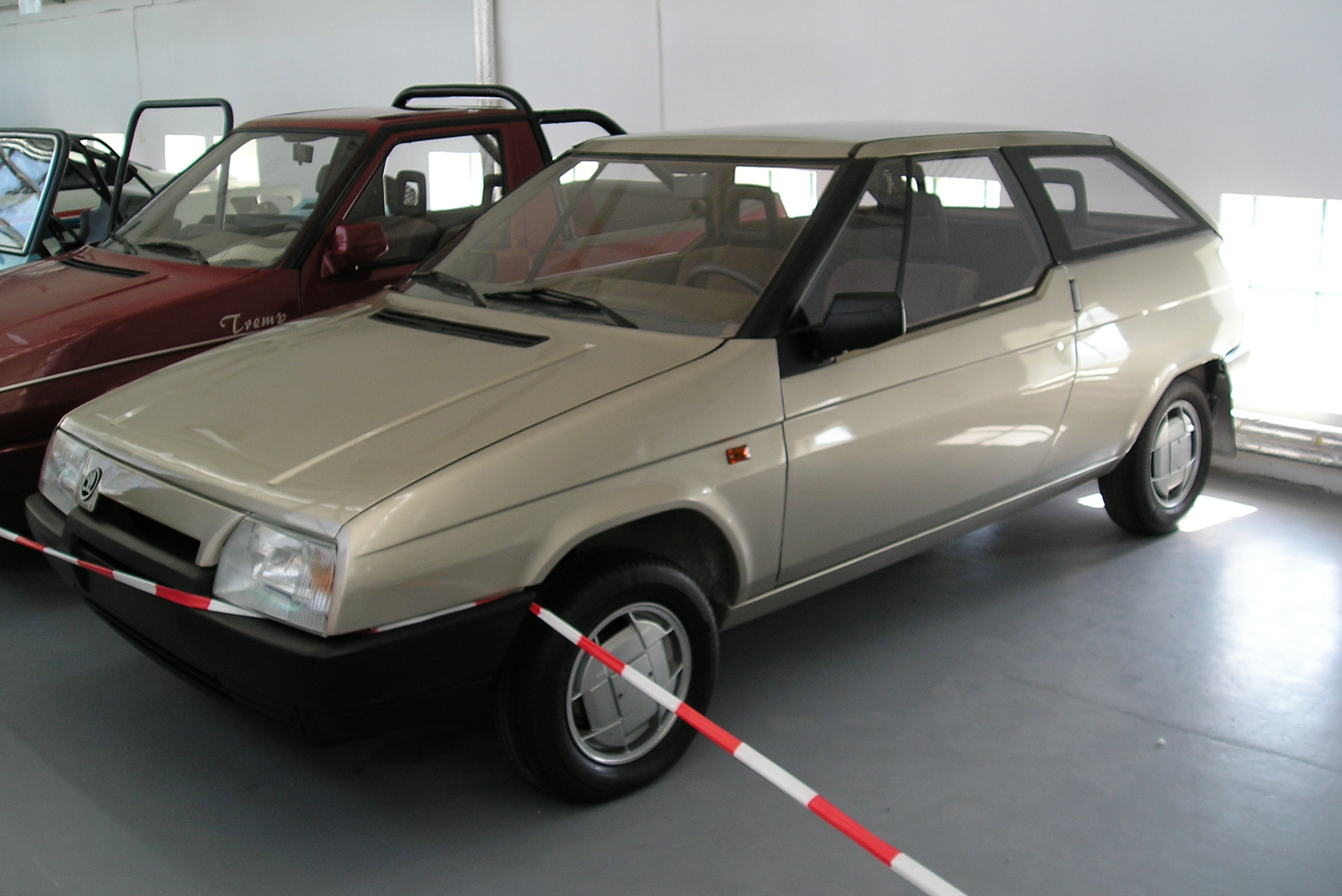
783 Favorit Coupé

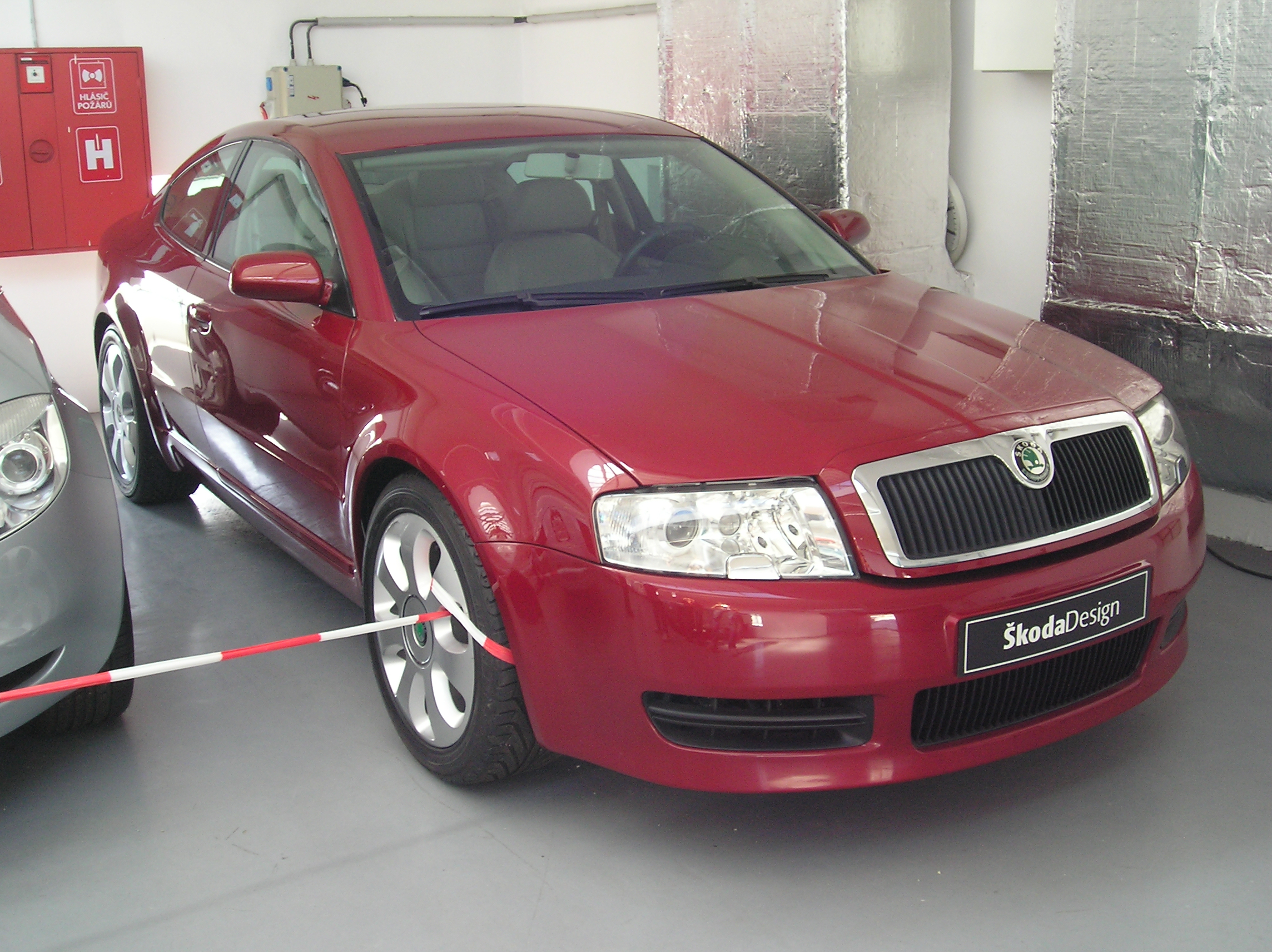
Tudor

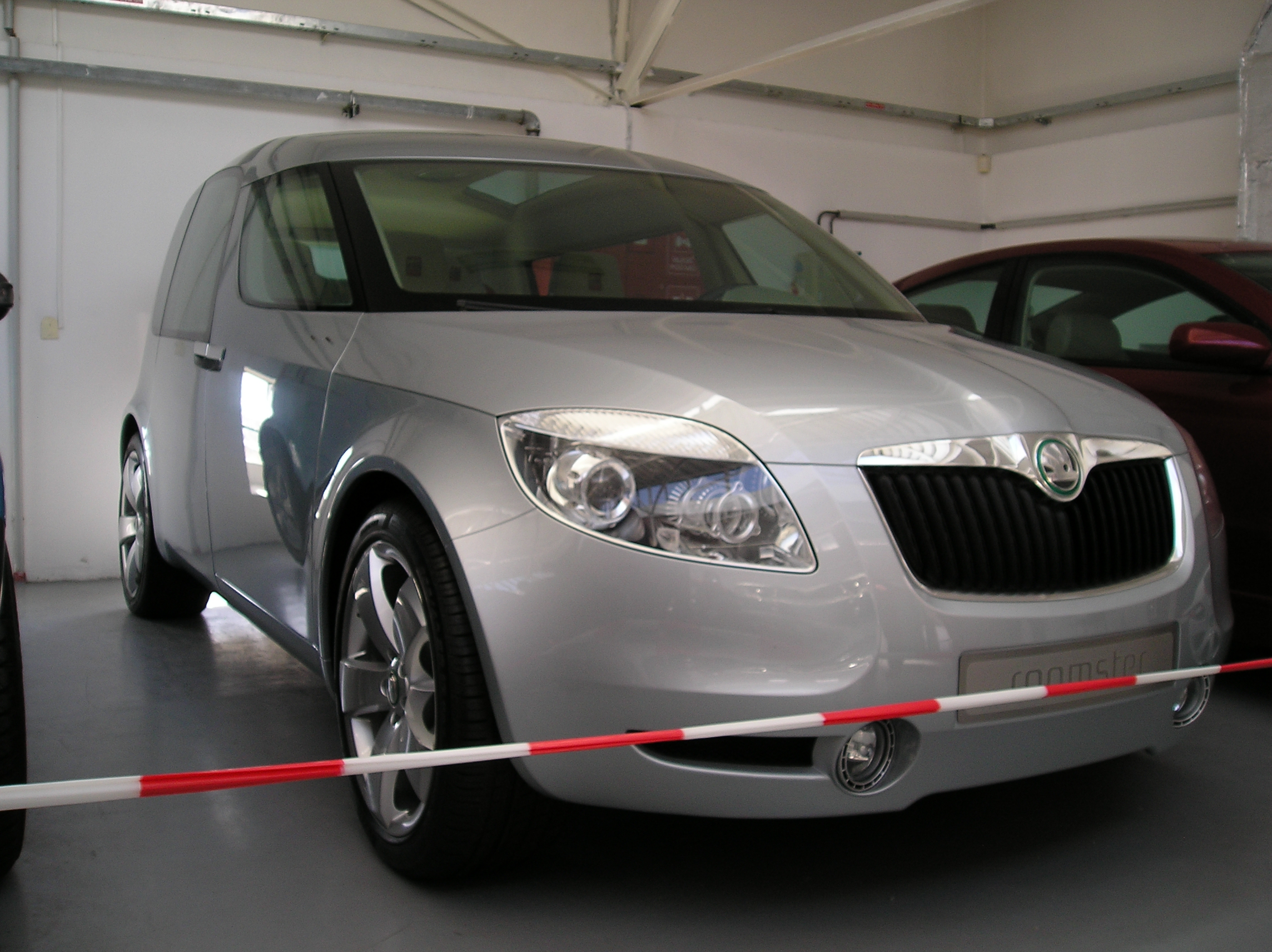
Roomster

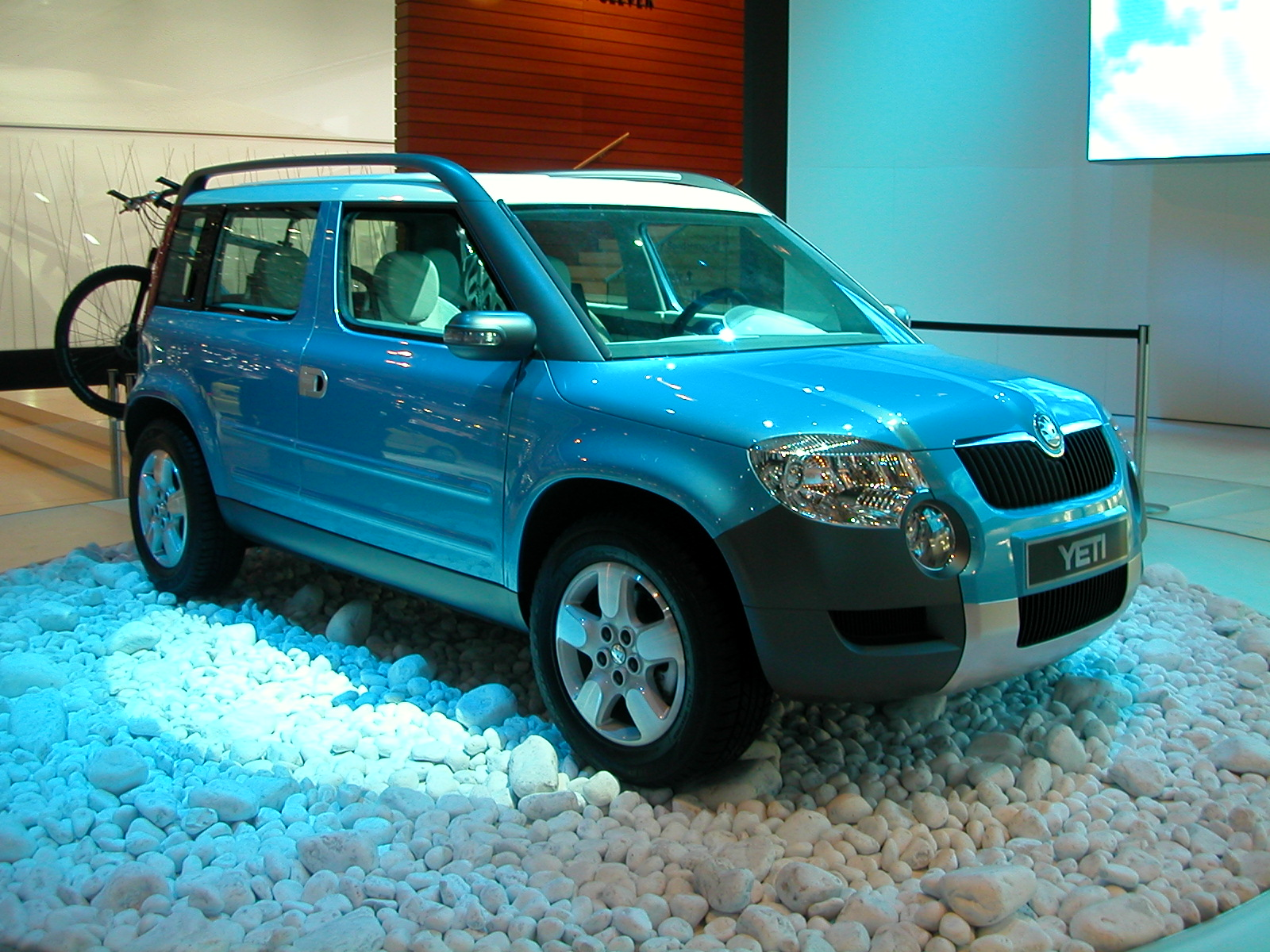
Yeti II

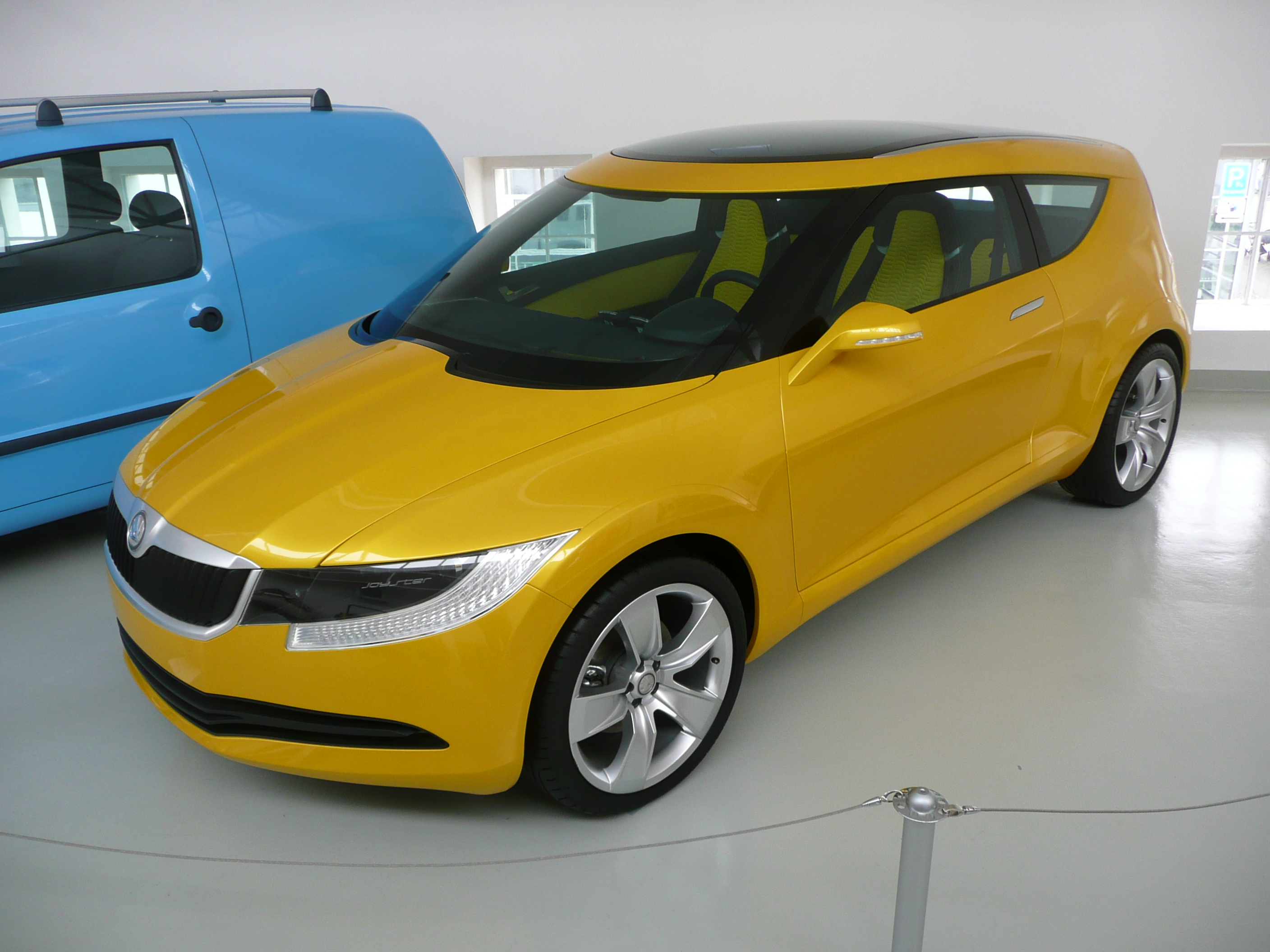
Joyster

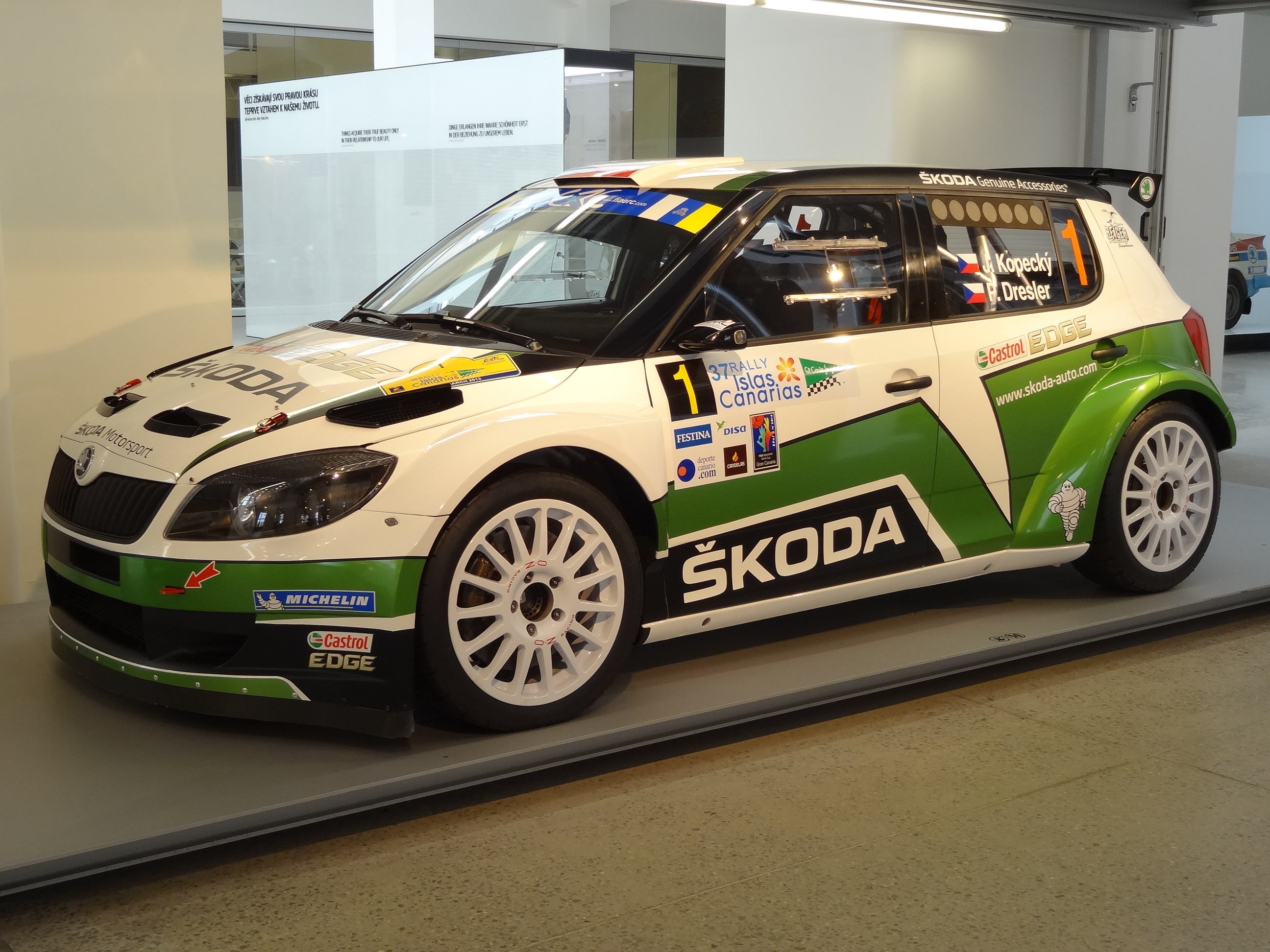
Fabia Super

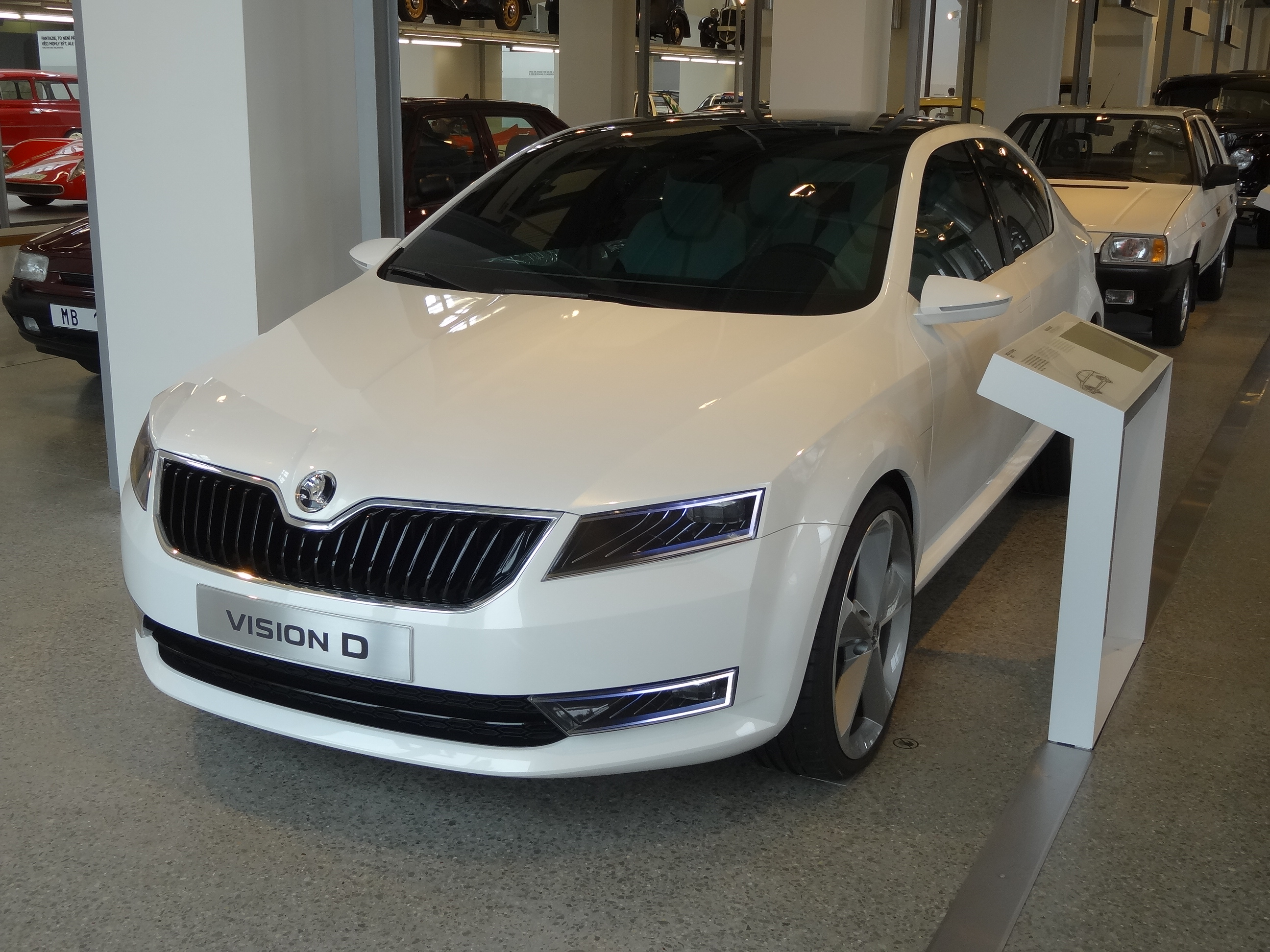
Vision D

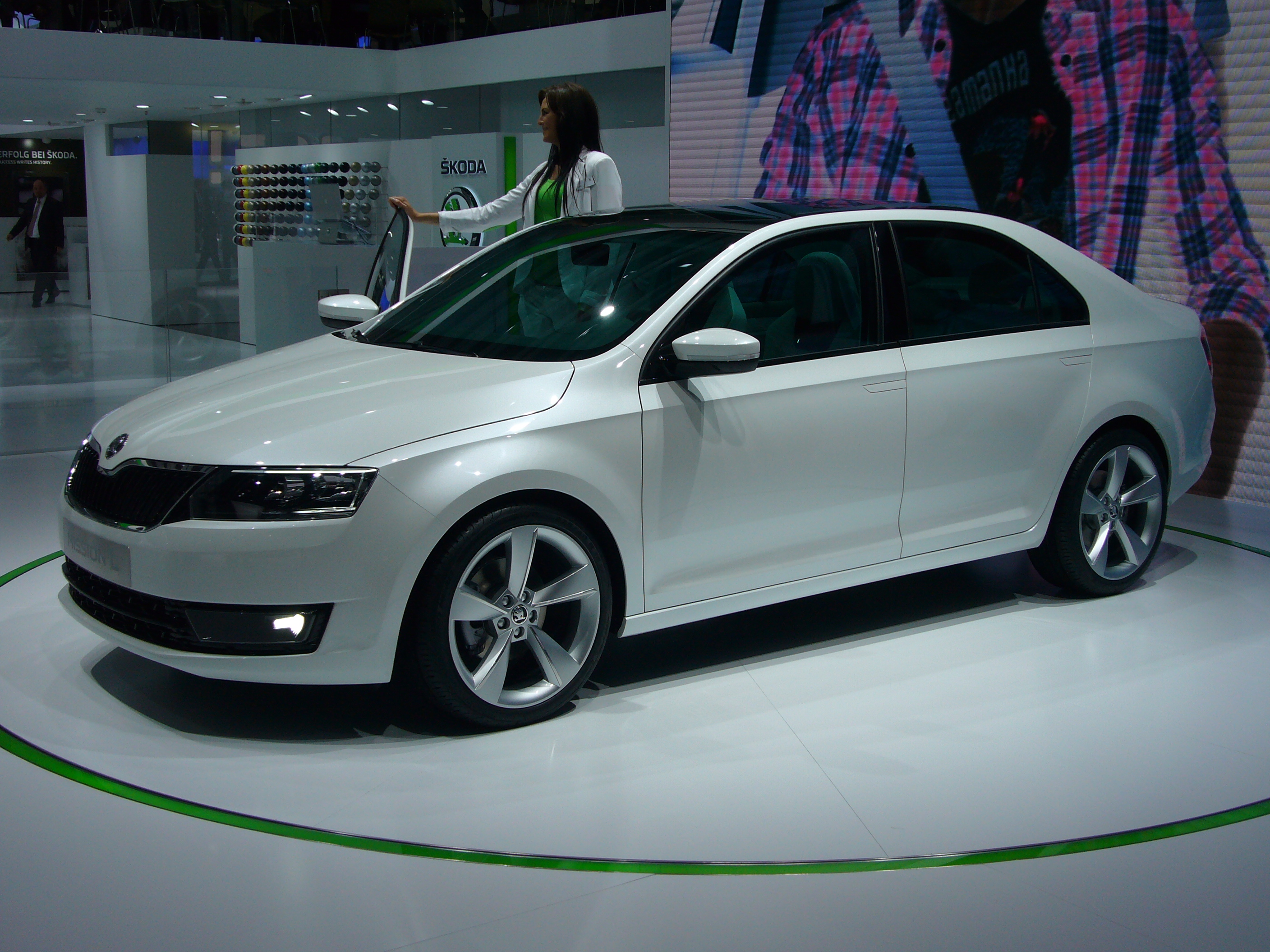
MissionL

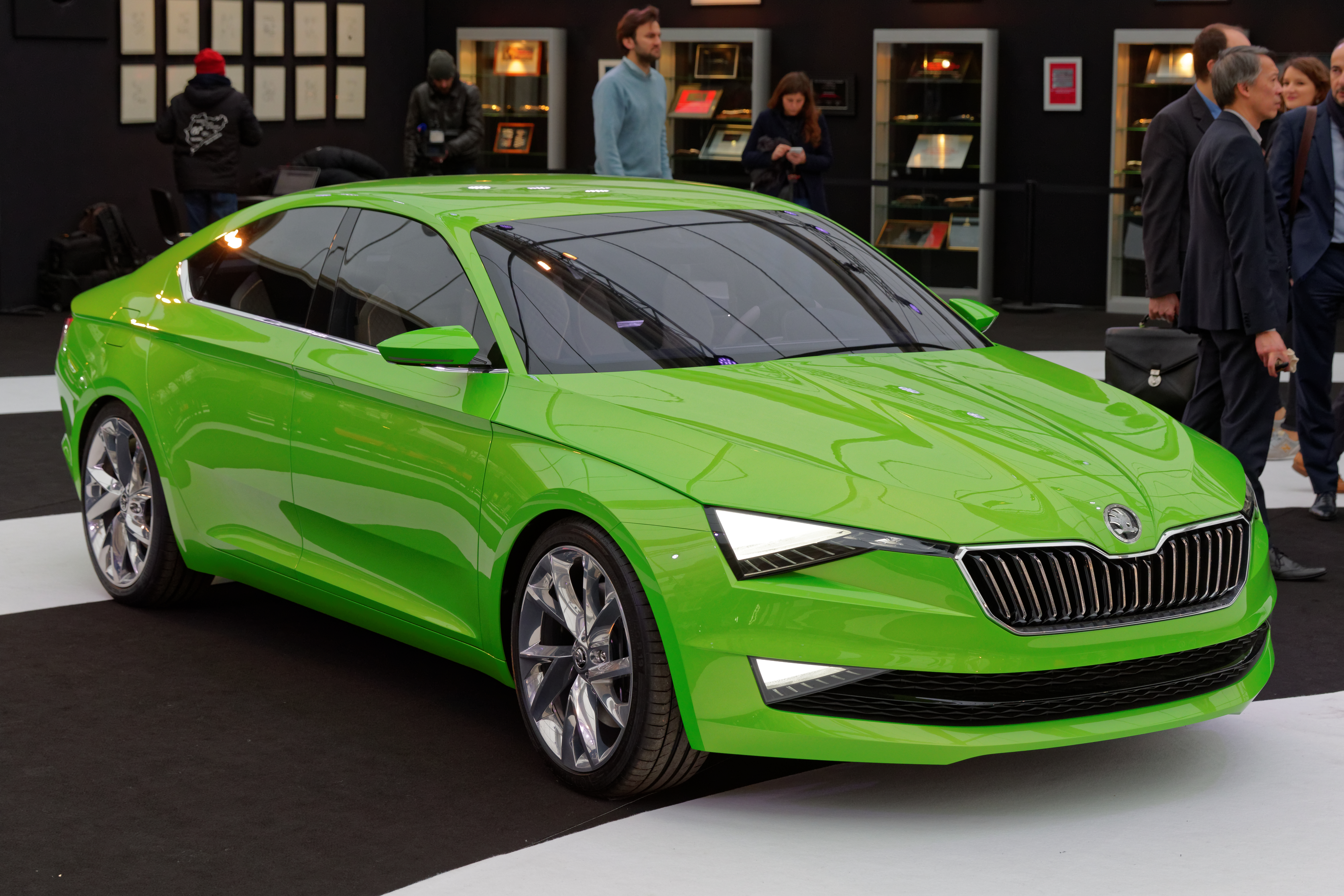
Vision C

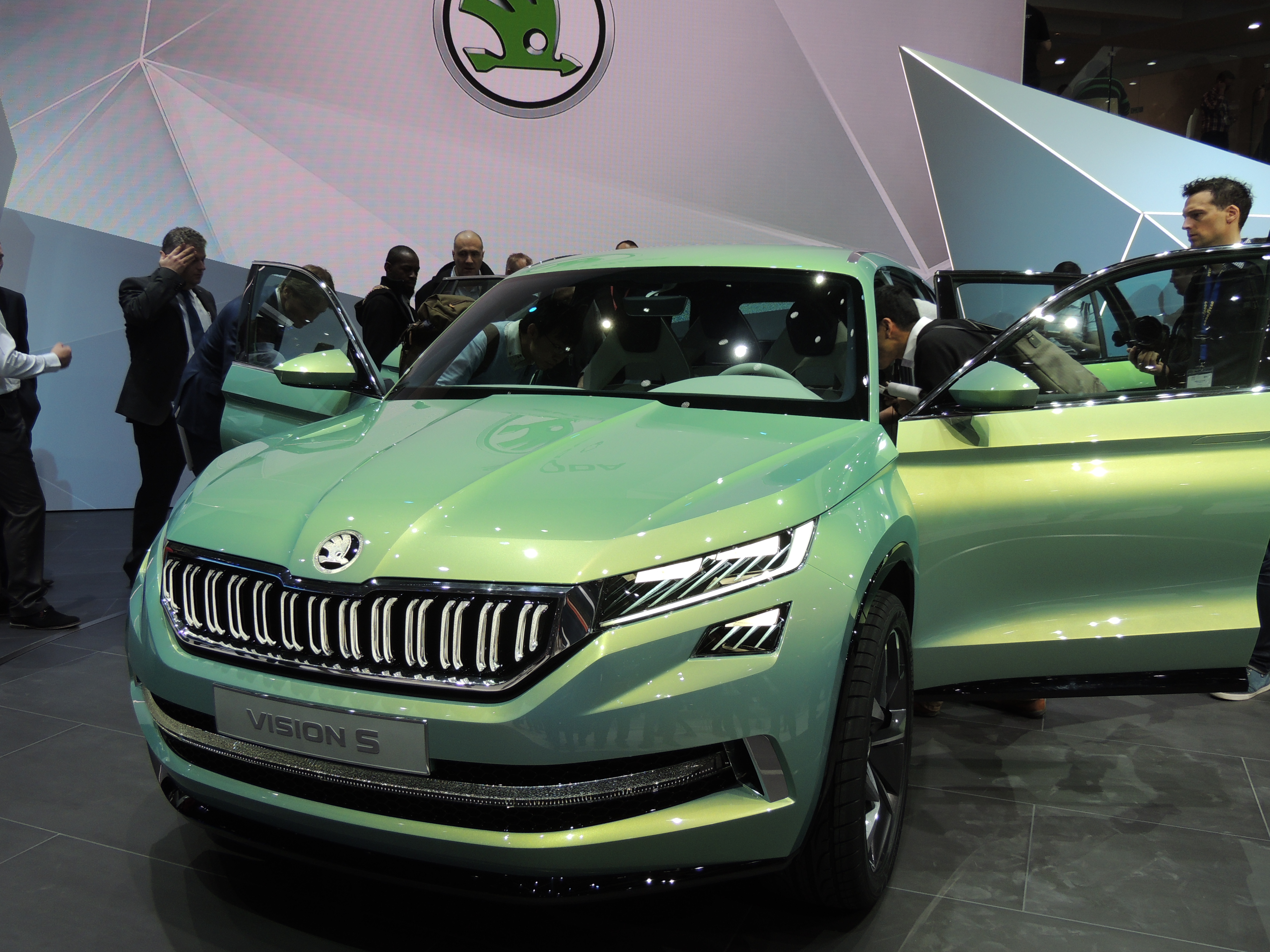
Vision S

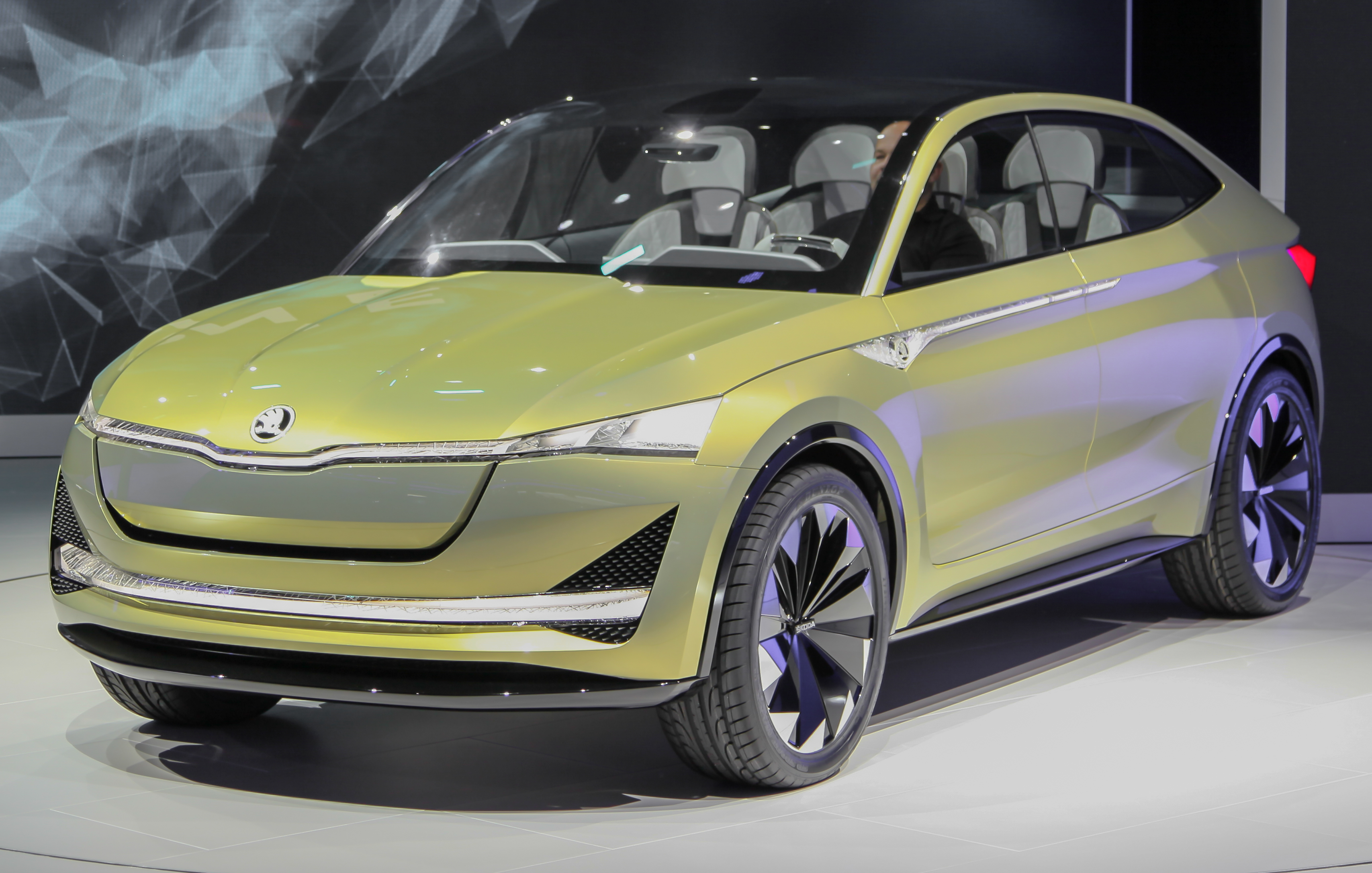
Vision E

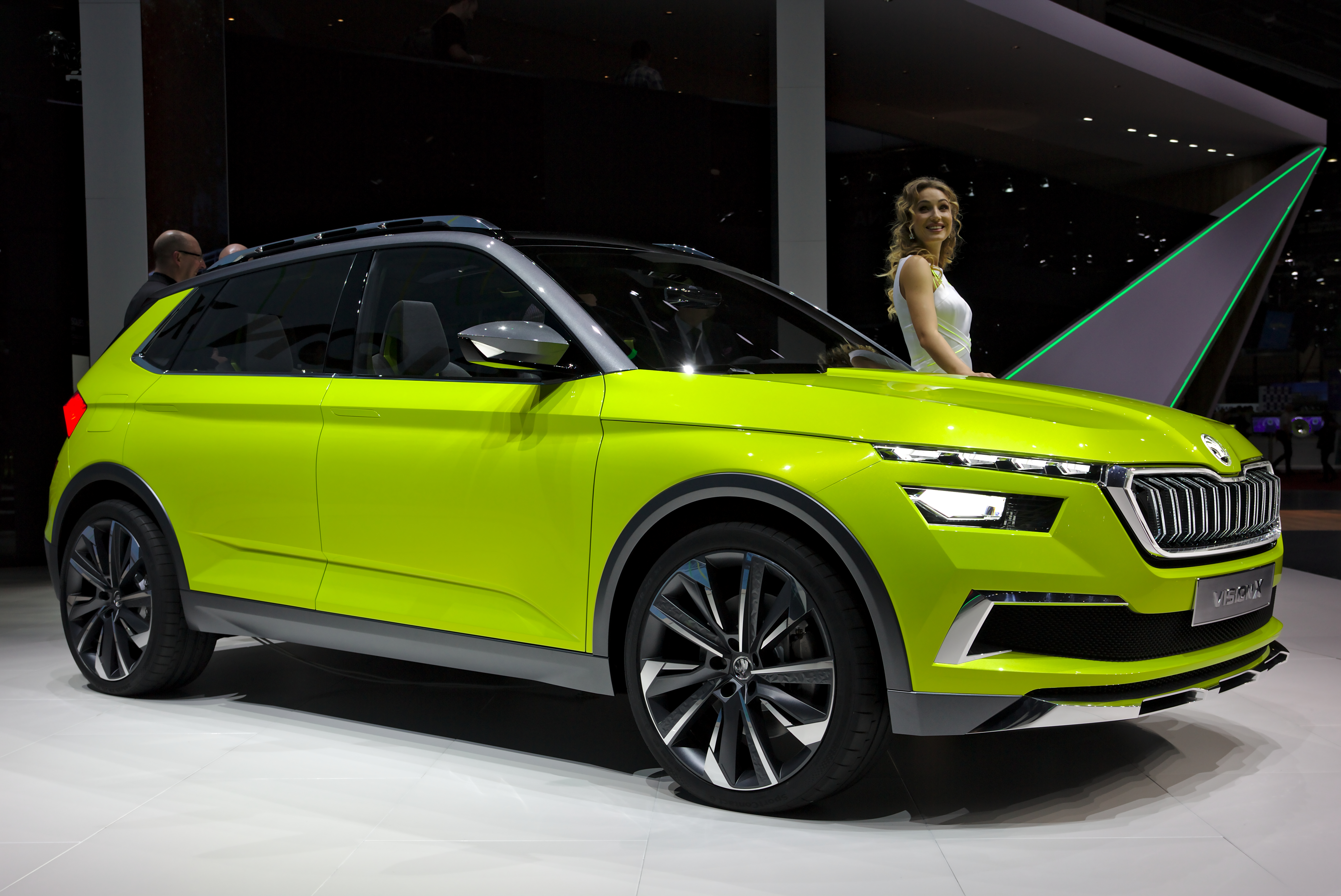
Vision X

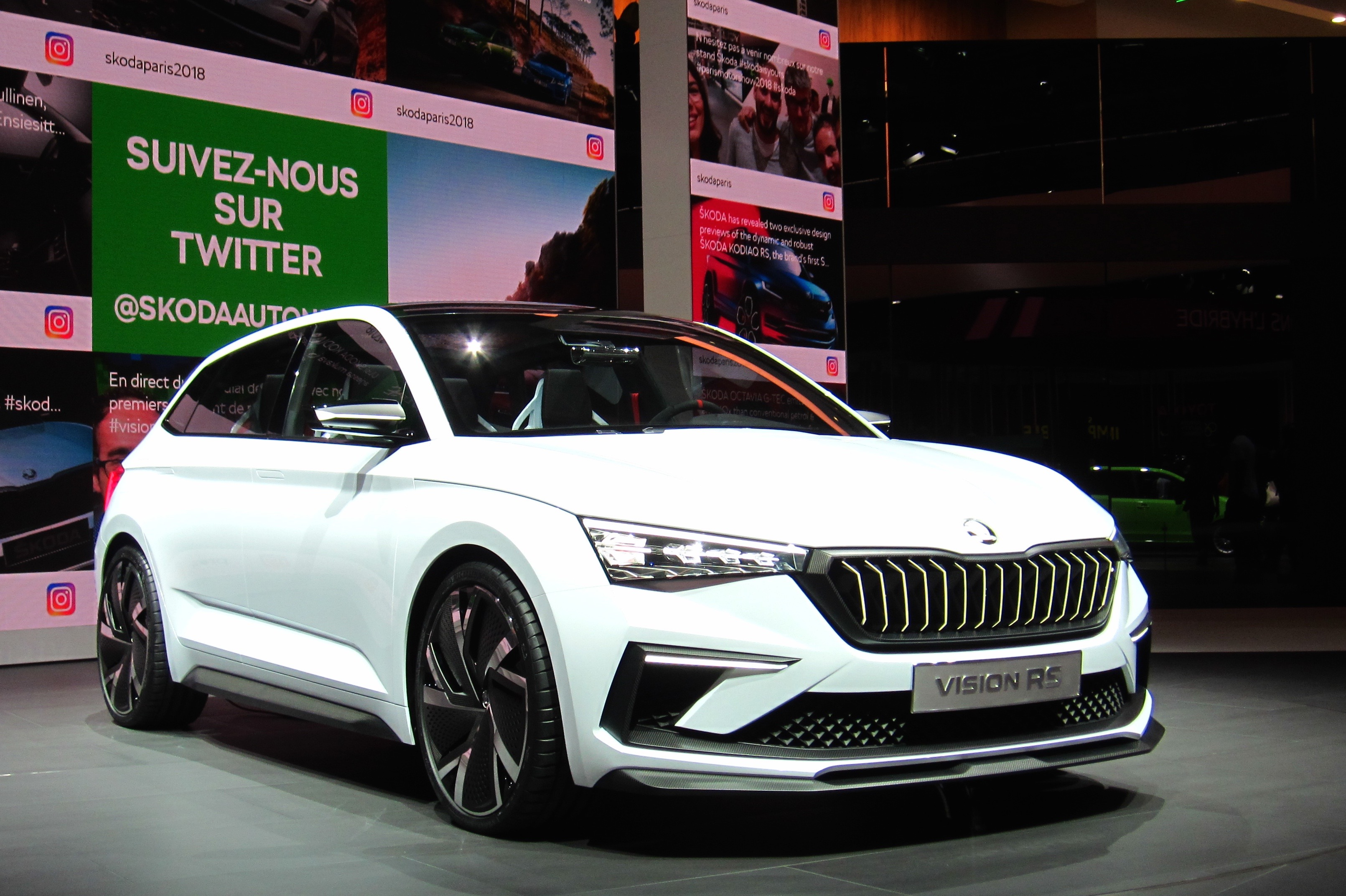
Vision RS

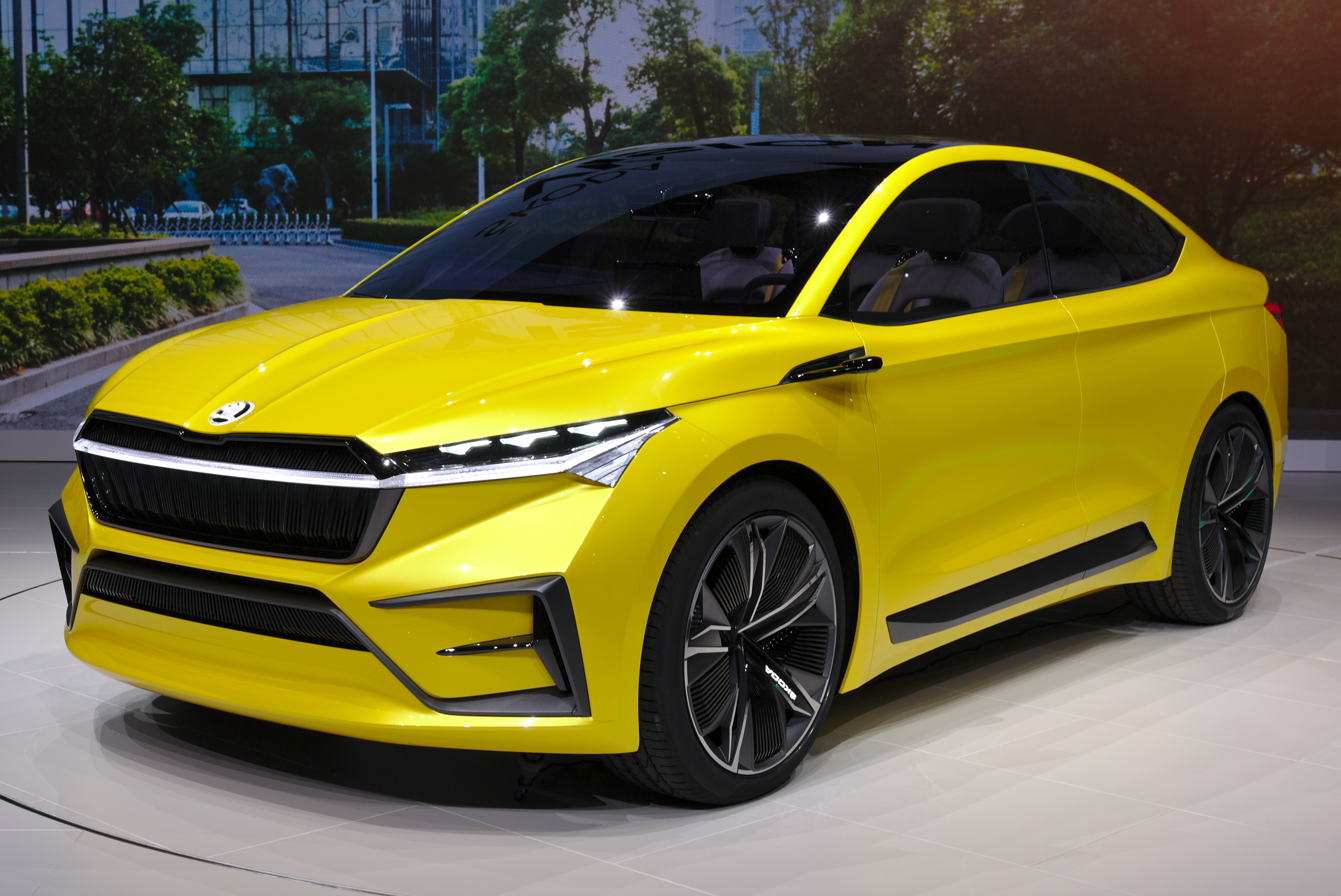
Vision iV

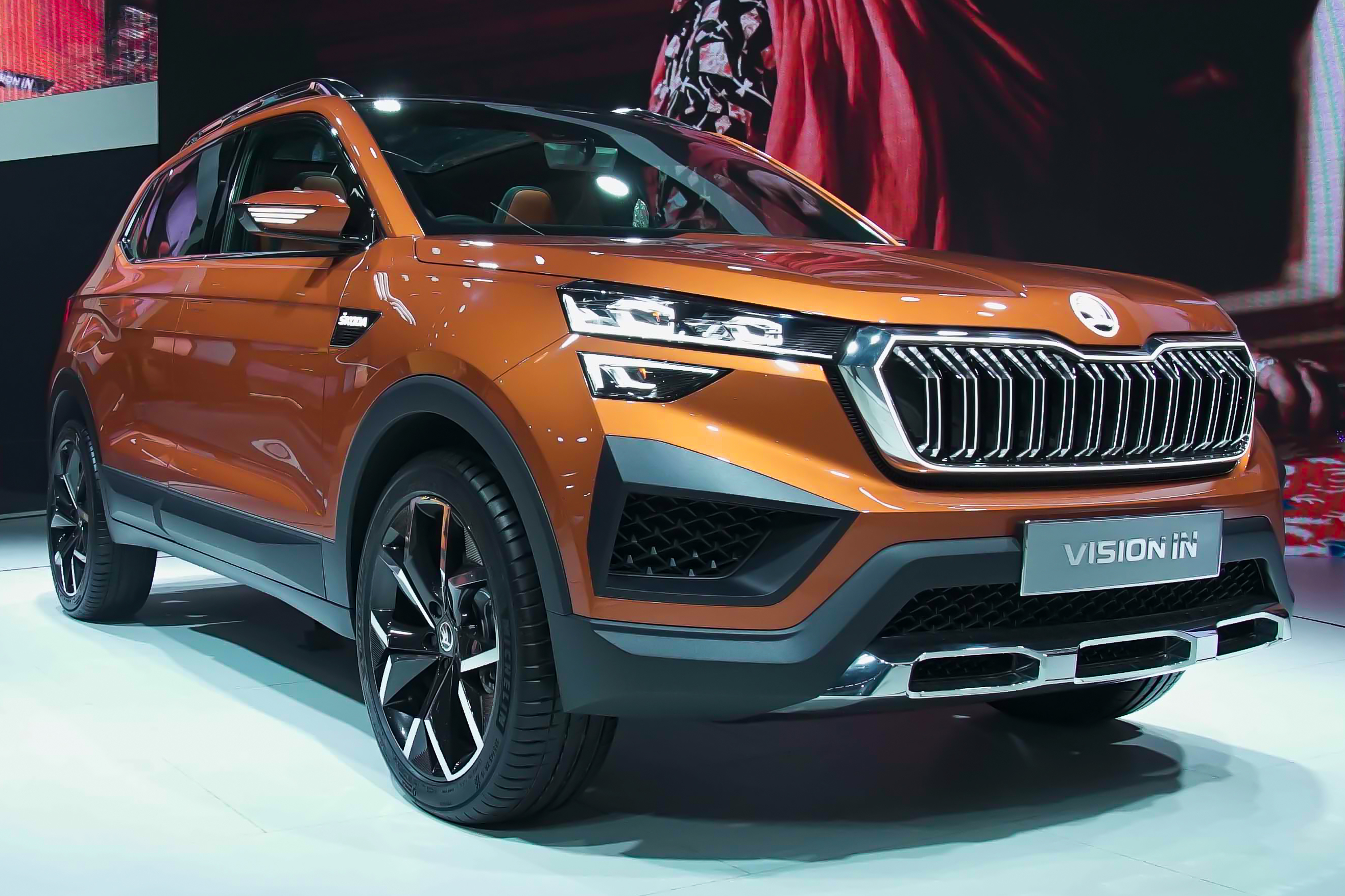
Vision IN

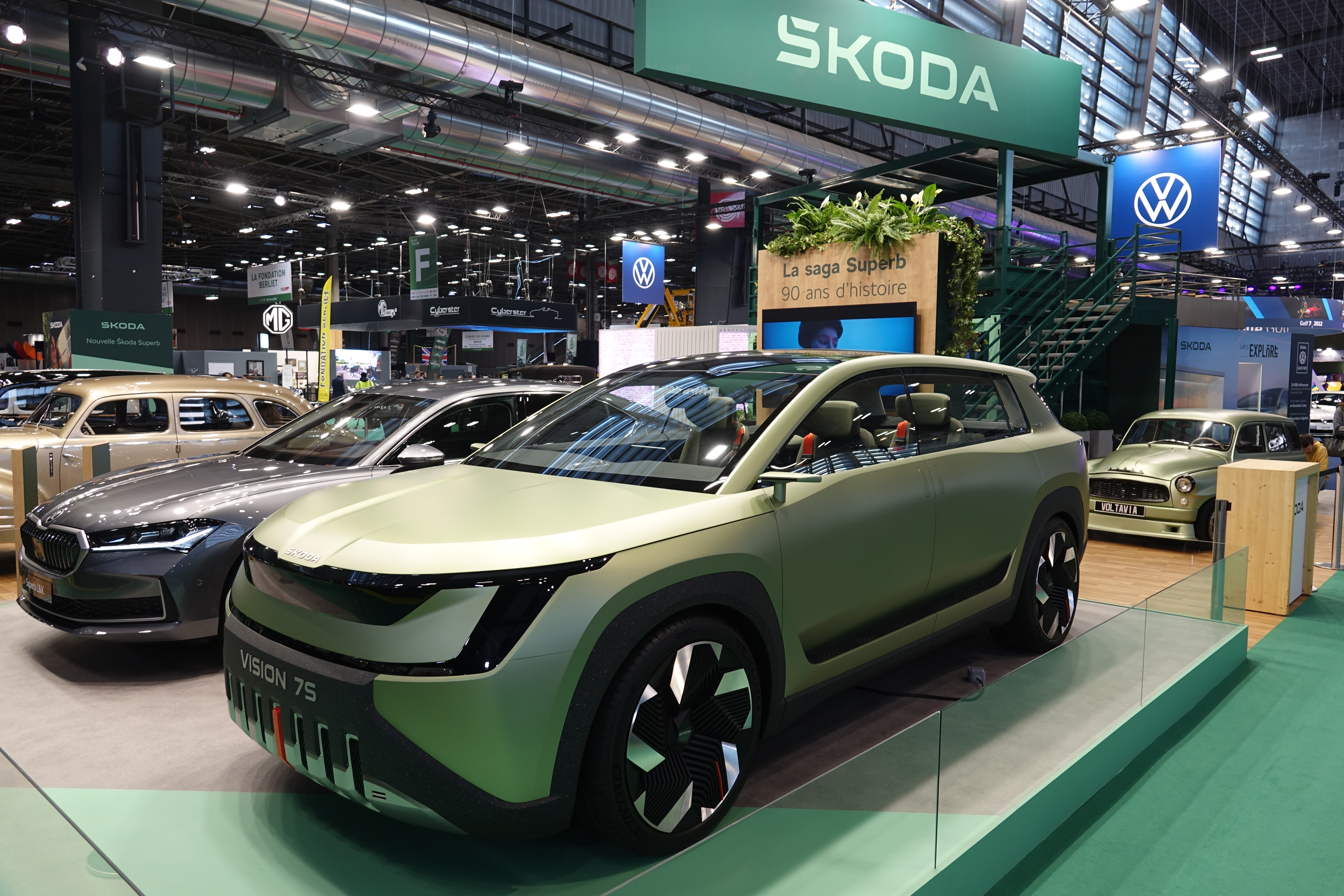
Vision 7S

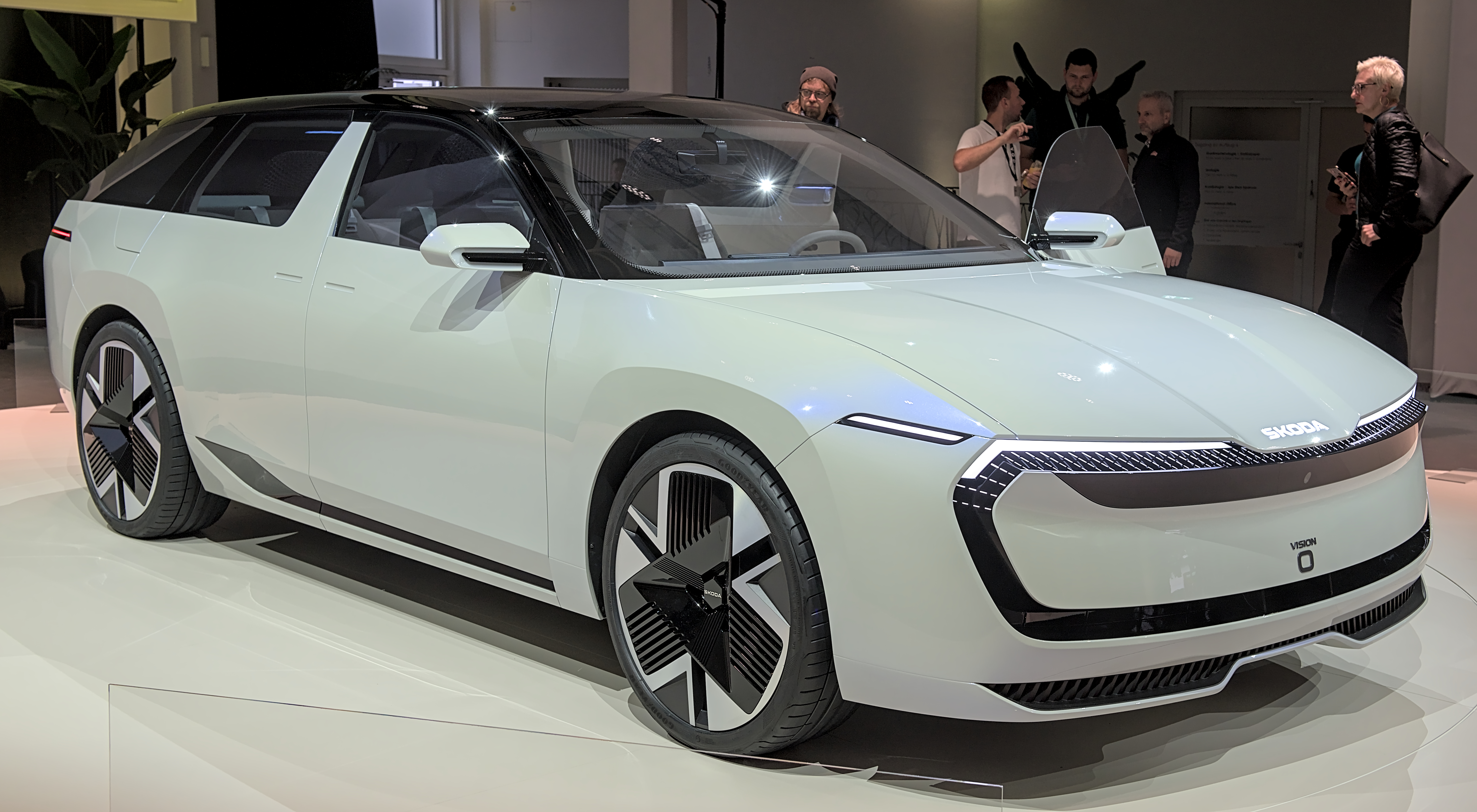
Vision O

== See also ==
- List of Škoda Auto engines
