= Škoda 932 =

Car prototype

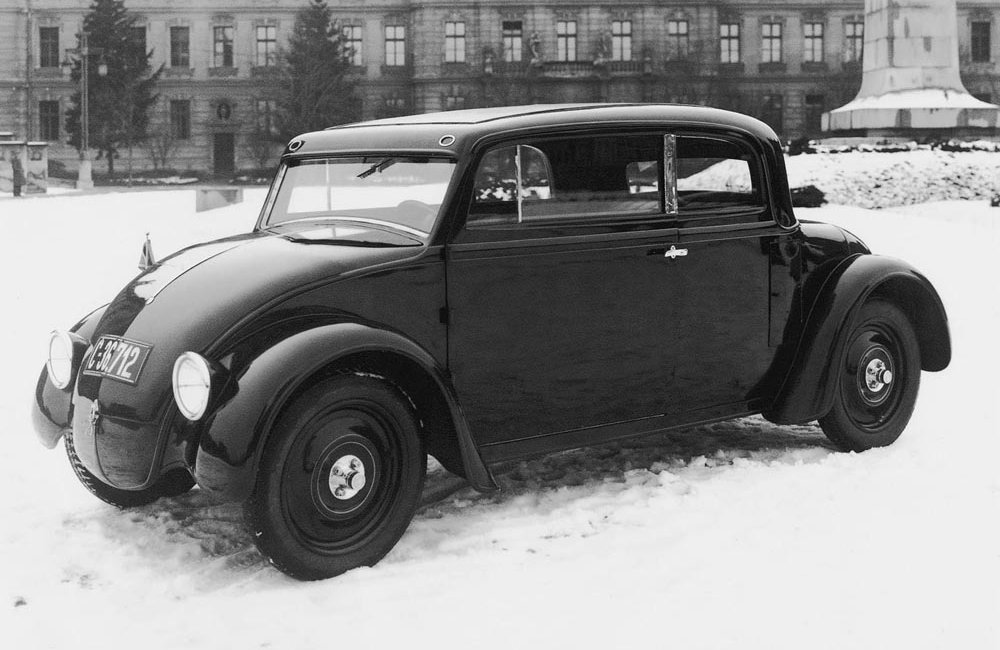
Škoda Š 932 prototype, 1932

The Škoda 932 was an experimental prototype small four-seater car prototype made by the Czechoslovak manufacturer Škoda. The streamlined body was made of mixed wood/steel construction, the engine was installed at the rear. Only one unit was made.

The air-cooled, side-valve four-cylinder four-stroke flat-four engine had a displacement of 1498 cc and an output of 22 kW (30 hp). The driving force was transmitted to the rear wheels via the transmission flange on the engine block. The car's frame, bifurcated at the front and rear, was formed by a pair of pressed steel profiles. The front and rear wheels were independently suspended. The vehicle was designed by the Škoda director Karel Hrdlička (1888-1979) and designer Vsevold Korolkov (1893-1942) in June 1932 and finished in October of the same year. However, series production never took place.

== See also ==
- Škoda Auto
- List of Škoda vehicles
- Economy car
