= List of Škoda Auto engines =

This is a list of Škoda Auto engines.

== OHV (1964–2003) ==
Škoda OHV is family of aluminium-block OHV engines developed by Škoda in 1964 for 1000MB and with various modifications manufactured for range of models until 2003. All versions were four-cylinders with aluminium block, three-bearing crankshaft and wet liners, which were made in various bores to allow variety of displacements. Until 1987, all engines used iron cast five port cylinder head, after that year, 135 and 136 versions for Škoda Favorit and all subsequent variants used Aluminium eight port head.

=== Iron-cast head engines ===
==== 988 cc (1964-1977) ====
bore 68 mm (2.68 in), stroke 68 mm (2.68 in), compression ratio 8,3:1, 32 kW/4650RPM, torque 68 Nm/3000RPM

Used in:

- Škoda 1000 MB (1964–1969)
- Škoda 100 (1969–1976)

==== 1107 cc (1967-1977) ====
bore 72 mm (2.83 in), stroke 68 mm (2.68 in), compression ratio 9,5:1, 38 kW/4800RPM, torque 83 Nm/3000RPM

Used in:

- Škoda 1100 MB (1967–1969)
- Škoda 1100 MBX
- Škoda 110 (1969–1976)
- Škoda 110R Coupé (1970–1980)

==== Škoda 742.10 - 1046 cc (1976-1989) ====
bore 68 mm (2.68 in), stroke 72 mm (2.83 in)

Used in:

- Škoda 105 (1976–1989)

==== Škoda 742.12 - 1174 cc (1976-1990) ====
bore 72 mm (2.83 in), stroke 72 mm (2.83 in)

Used in:

- Škoda 120 (1976–1990)
- Škoda 125 (1988–1990)

===== 742.12x (1977-1986) =====
A more powerful variant of the 1.2-litre 742.12 engine, with a compression ratio of 9.5:1

40,5 kW/5200RPM, torque 85,5Nm/3250RPM

Used in:

- Škoda 120 LS/GLS (1977–1987)
- Škoda Garde/Rapid 120 (1982-1986)

==== Škoda 742-13 - 1289 cc (1984-1988) ====
bore 75.5 mm (2.97 in), 72 mm (2.83 in), compression ratio 9,5:1 43 kW/5000RPM, toque 97Nm/2800RPM

Used in:

- Škoda 130 (1984–1988)
- Škoda Rapid 130 (1984-1988)

=== Aluminium head engines ===
For the 1987 Favorit, Škoda made major modifications to the 130 engine to meet new, stricter emission standards. The new engine had bimetallic pistons to lower oil consumption and a new 8-port cylinder head, which improved power output and allowed the engine to run on unleaded fuel. To fit the new cylinder head, the engine block also had to be modified. In 1993, this engine became available with Bosch single-point injection system and a catalytic converter. In 1996, the engine was further modified to meet Euro 2 emission standards: modifications included a multipoint injection system, larger camshaft bearings, and larger intake/exhaust valves, which further improved power output and efficiency of engine.

In 1999, the engine received its last major modification. The engine block was reinforced and modified to fit a larger 78 mm (3.07 in) crankshaft, valvetrain and lubrication system was modified to fit hydraulic tappets. As there was no need for a distributor (MPI using an ignition module mounted to the cylinder head), the valvetrain cover (hitherto unchanged since 1964) could be made narrower, moving the accessory belt closer to engine. This also allowed the engine to be fitted to the smaller VW Lupo. The injection system was upgraded, now using two lambda probes and a drive-by-wire throttle valve. These modifications allowed the engine to meet Euro 4 emission standards, before production ended in the spring of 2003.

==== 997 cc (1999-2001) ====
bore 72 mm (2.83 in), stroke 61.2 mm (2.41 in)

- Škoda Fabia
- VW Lupo
- Seat Arosa

==== 1289 cc (1987-2003) ====
bore 75.5 mm (2.97 in), stroke 72 mm (2.83 in)

- Škoda 135/136 (1987–1990)
- Škoda Rapid 135/136 (1987–1990)
- Škoda Favorit (1987–1995)
- Škoda Felicia (1994–2000)

==== 1397 cc (2000-2003) ====
bore 75.5 mm (2.97 in), stroke 78 mm (3.07 in)

- Škoda Fabia (2000–2003)
- Škoda Octavia (1999–2001)

=== See also ===
- Škoda Auto
- List of Volkswagen Group engines
