= Škoda Vision O =

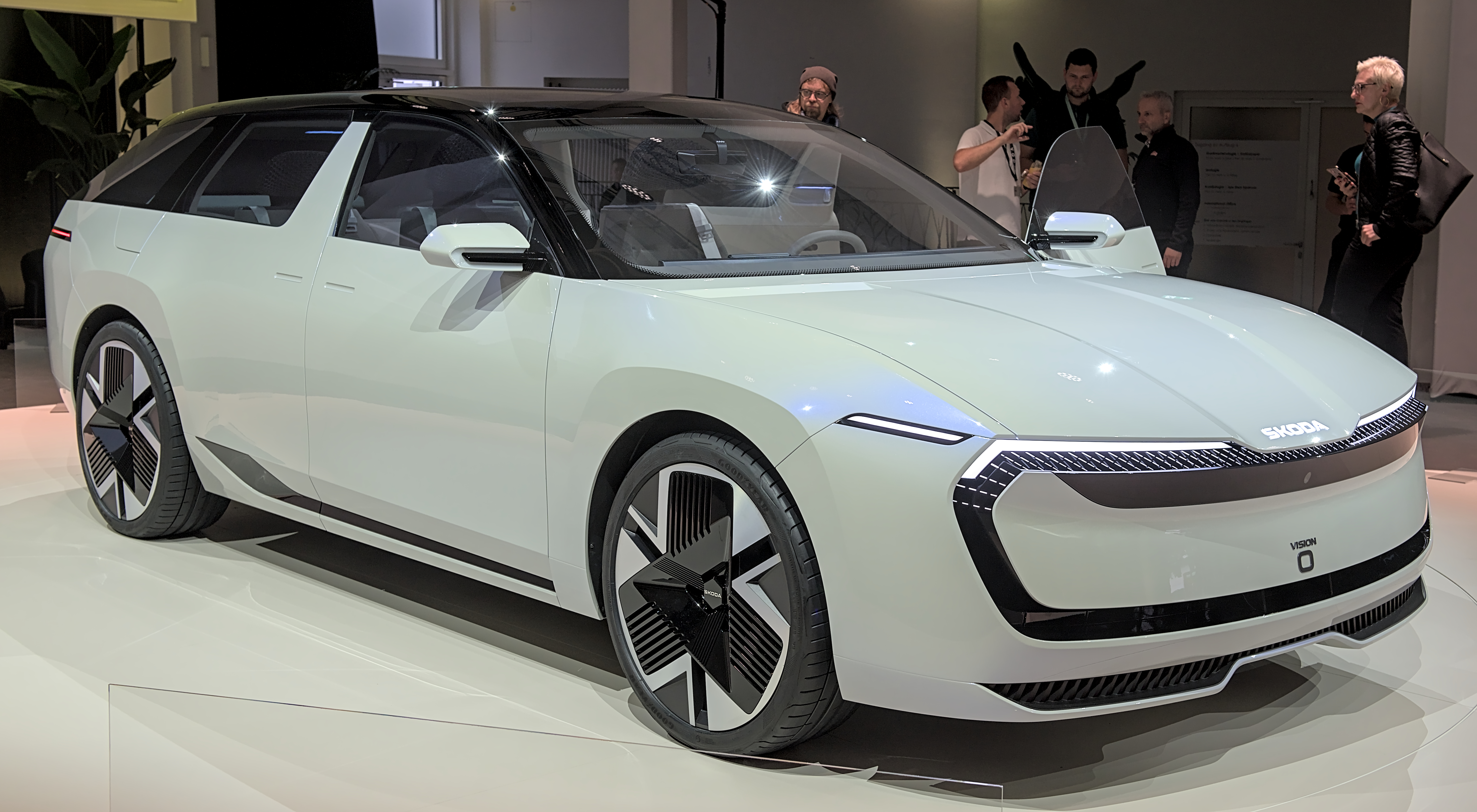

Overview
- Manufacturer: Škoda Auto

Body and chassis
- Body style: 5-door estate

Dimensions
- Length: 4,850 mm (190.9 in)
- Width: 1,900 mm (74.8 in)
- Height: 1,500 mm (59.1 in)

Chronology
- Predecessor: Škoda Octavia

The Škoda Vision O is an electric estate concept car unveiled at the 2025 Munich Motor Show, reportedly offering an insight into the 2028 Škoda Octavia.

== Interior ==
The interior features a high level display panel running from side to side (called "Horizon Display") with a central screen. Skoda showed its AI assistant called Laura as an integral part of the car's technology.

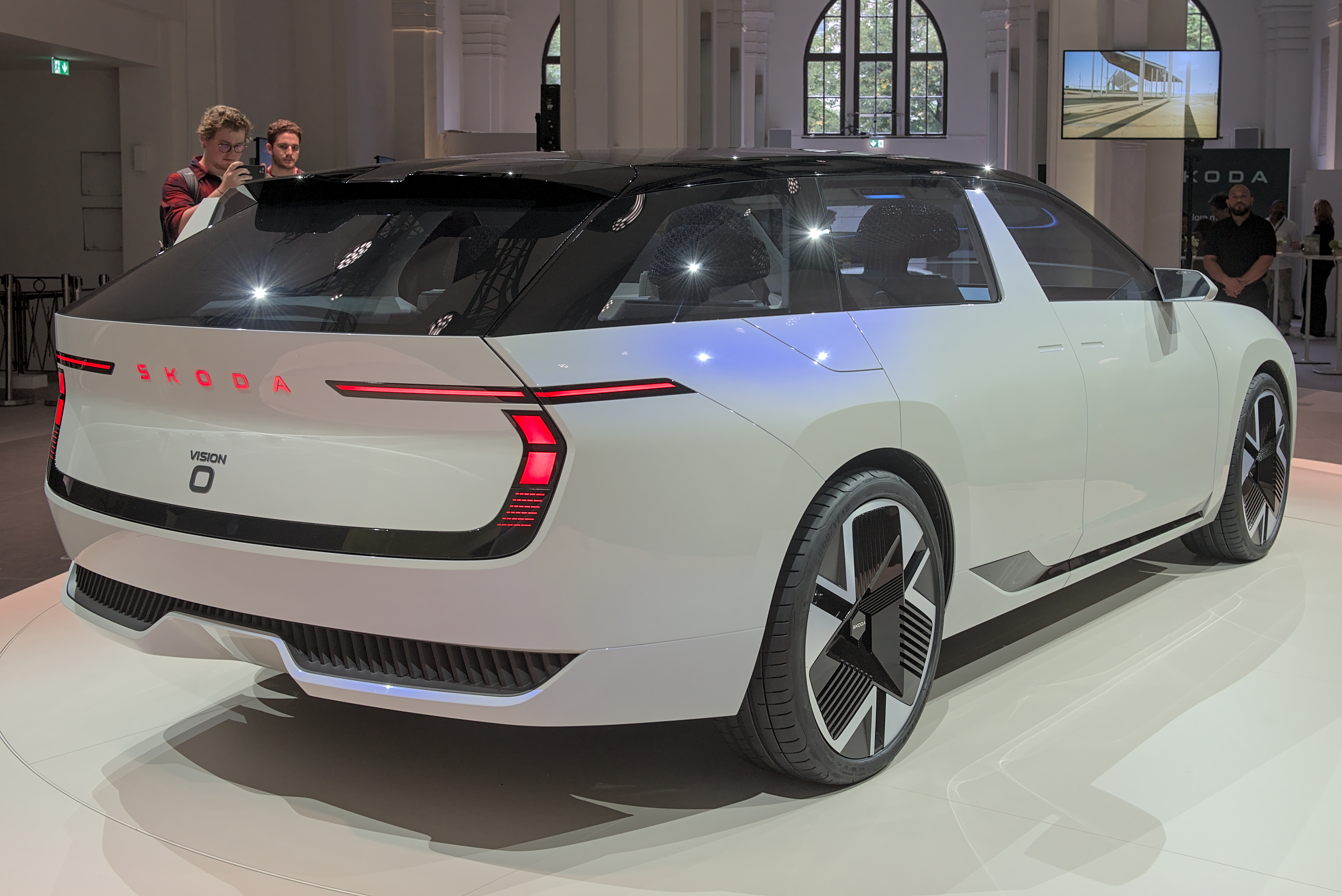
Rear view

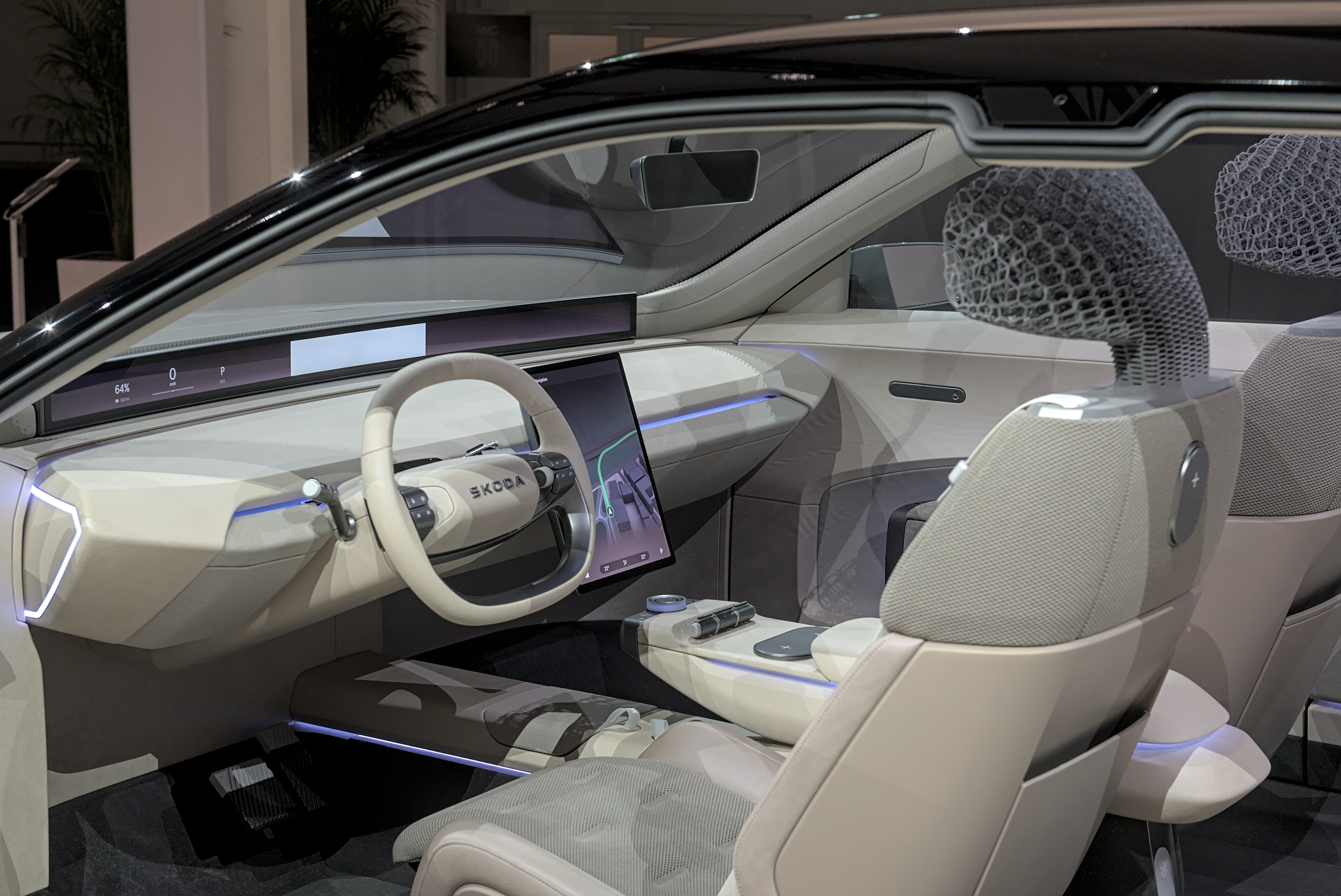
Interior
