= 1962 Bathurst Six Hour Classic =

Map of the track

The 1962 Bathurst Six Hour Classic was an endurance race for production touring cars and production sports cars. The event was staged at the Mount Panorama Circuit near Bathurst, New South Wales, on 30 September 1962.

There was no outright winner of the race, official results being declared only for the six divisions.

== Results ==
Division A : Production Touring Cars Up To £900
Pos.	Drivers	No.	Car	Entrant	Laps
1	F. Kleinig; Frank Kleinig, Jnr.	5	Morris 850	F. Kleinig Motors	88
2	R. Haylen; A. Hill	3	Morris 850	Motoria Pty. Ltd.	87
3	D. West; W Pitt	12	Škoda Super Octavia	Hercules Motors Pty. Ltd.	87
4	Tony Allan; David Hooker	4	Morris 850	Team Hooker-Allan	87
5	W. Shepherd; R. Morris	2	NSU Prinz	Ray Morris Motors	84
6	F. McEnroe; D. Humphreys	9	Morris 850	John R. Malcolm Motors	83
7	J. Cummins; D Johnson	15	Hillman Husky	Sydney Speed Shop	82
8	J. Gates; M. Nedelko	14	Ford Anglia	Kloster Pty. Ltd.	79
9	Arnold Glass; Noel Hall	7	Datsun Bluebird	Capitol Motors	78
10	W. Weekes; B. Fleming	10	Morris 850	G.P. Cars Racing Team	78
11	K. Malcolm; Ralph Sach	1	NSU Prinz	Boss Hill Service Station	66
12	Lorraine Hill; Virginia Lighezzolo	11	Škoda Super Octavia	Hercules Motors Pty. Ltd.	63
13	Alwyn Rose; T Sulman	8	Datsun Bluebird	Capitol Motors	61
DNF	John French; Paul Bolton	6	Datsun Bluebird	Capitol Motors	
Division B : Production Touring Cars £901 to £1050
Pos.	Drivers	No.	Car	Entrant	Laps
1	John Martin; C. Hodges	21	Škoda Felicia	Hercules Motors Pty. Ltd.	88
2	Ron Hodgson; Digby Cooke	23	Morris Major Elite	Lovell Motors Pty. Ltd.	88
3	K. Lindsay; A. Heasman	16	Morris Major Elite	Ken Lindsay Motors	87
4	Peter Wherrett; Frank Davidson	22	Hillman Minx Australian DeLuxe	Lovell Motors Pty Ltd	87
5	Carl Kennedy; Doug Stewart	20	Simca Aronde	Harden & Johnston Pty. Ltd.	87
6	W. Parker; A. Stanfield	17	Fiat 1100	Bill Parker	80
DNF	Bill March; Allan Bridge	18	Renault Gordini	W. March	
DNF	J. Downie; P. Treglown	19	Morris Major	Orana Auo Sales	
Division C : Production Touring Cars £1051 to £1250
Pos.	Drivers	No.	Car	Entrant	Laps
1	Bruce McPhee; Barry Mulholland	24	Morris Cooper	Regal Motors Pty. Ltd.	95
2	Charlie Smith; B. Maher	28	Austin Freeway	C. G. Smith	95
3	Barry Gurdon; J. Trevor-Jones	27	Austin Freeway	Gurdon Motor Pty. Ltd.	89
4	I Grant; T Marden	25	Holden	Geissler Motors	89
5	Bob Holden; K. Brigden	30	Peugeot 403	Killara Motors	88
6	Ron Marshall; Bruce Marshall	26	Holden	Marshall's Garage	79
DNF	Bob Jane; Harry Firth	29	Ford Falcon XK	Ford Motor Coy (Aust) Pty. Ltd.	38
Division D : Production Touring Cars £1251 to £1700
Pos.	Drivers	No.	Car	Entrant	Laps
1	Don Algie; Kingsley Hibbard	35	Studebaker Lark	Hospital Hill Motors, Wollongong	99
2	David McKay; Greg Cusack	37	Fiat 1500	Scuderia Veloce Pty. Ltd.	98
3	Peter Williamson; K. Whightley	40	Fiat 1500	P. Williamson	97
4	Bill Buckle; Brian Foley	34	Citroën ID19	Scuderia Veloce Pty. Ltd.	97
5	B. Lawler; H. Gapps	33	Fiat 1500	Otten Motors	96
6	Jim Wright; Frank Hann	36	Studebaker Lark	J. Wright	95
7	Bill Slattery; J. Burge	38	Studebaker Lark	Needham Motors Pty. Ltd.	92
8	Lance Hill; Ralph Long	32	Fiat 1500	L. Hill	91
9	Bill Burns; Mike Crampton	31	Fiat 1500	Bill Burns Hire Cars	14
DNF	Brian Shaw; George Murray	39	Fiat 2300	B. G. Shaw	0
Division E : Production Sports Cars Up To £1500
Pos.	Drivers	No.	Car	Entrant	Laps
1	Tony Reynolds; Les Howard	45	Morgan Plus 4	A. J. Reynolds	94
2	Bill Reynolds; Kevin Bartlett	41	Austin-Healey Sprite Mk I	Mrs E. Peck	86
3	D. Owen; C. Wear	42	MGA 1500	P. A. Owen	86
DNF	K. John; Peter Caldecoat	43	MGA 1600	K. S. John	
Division F : Production Sports Cars £1501 to £2000
Pos.	Drivers	No.	Car	Entrant	Laps
1	Leo Geoghegan; Ian Geoghegan	52	Daimler SP250	Geoghegan Motors, Liverpool	104
2	C. Lansdowne; Holt Binnie	46	Triumph TR4	G. Lansdowne	100
3	Gordon Lansdowne; Dianne Walker	47	Triumph TR4	G. Lansdowne	98
4	Matt Daddo; Bill Stanley	50	MGA Twin Cam	Scuderia Octagon	72
DNF	N. Claydon; F. Gibson	51	MGA Twin Cam	N. Claydon	
DNF	Jim Clarke; A. Lazich	49	MGA Twin Cam	J. Clarke	

Notes:

- The Team's Prize was won by the Studebaker Larks entered by Hospital Hill Motors, Wollongong, J. Wright and Needham Motors Pty. Ltd.
