= 440 (disambiguation) =

440 may refer to:

- 440, the year
- 440 BC, the year
- 440 (number), the number
- The 440-yard dash, a track-and-field event
- Area code 440, a telephone area code in the Cleveland, Ohio area
- A440 (pitch standard), the frequency of the note A above middle C used in standard western music theory
- 440, the backup band for Dominican musician Juan Luis Guerra
- Volvo 440, a hatchback
- Škoda 440, a small family car
- 4-4-0, a type of steam locomotive
