= Škoda Felicia =

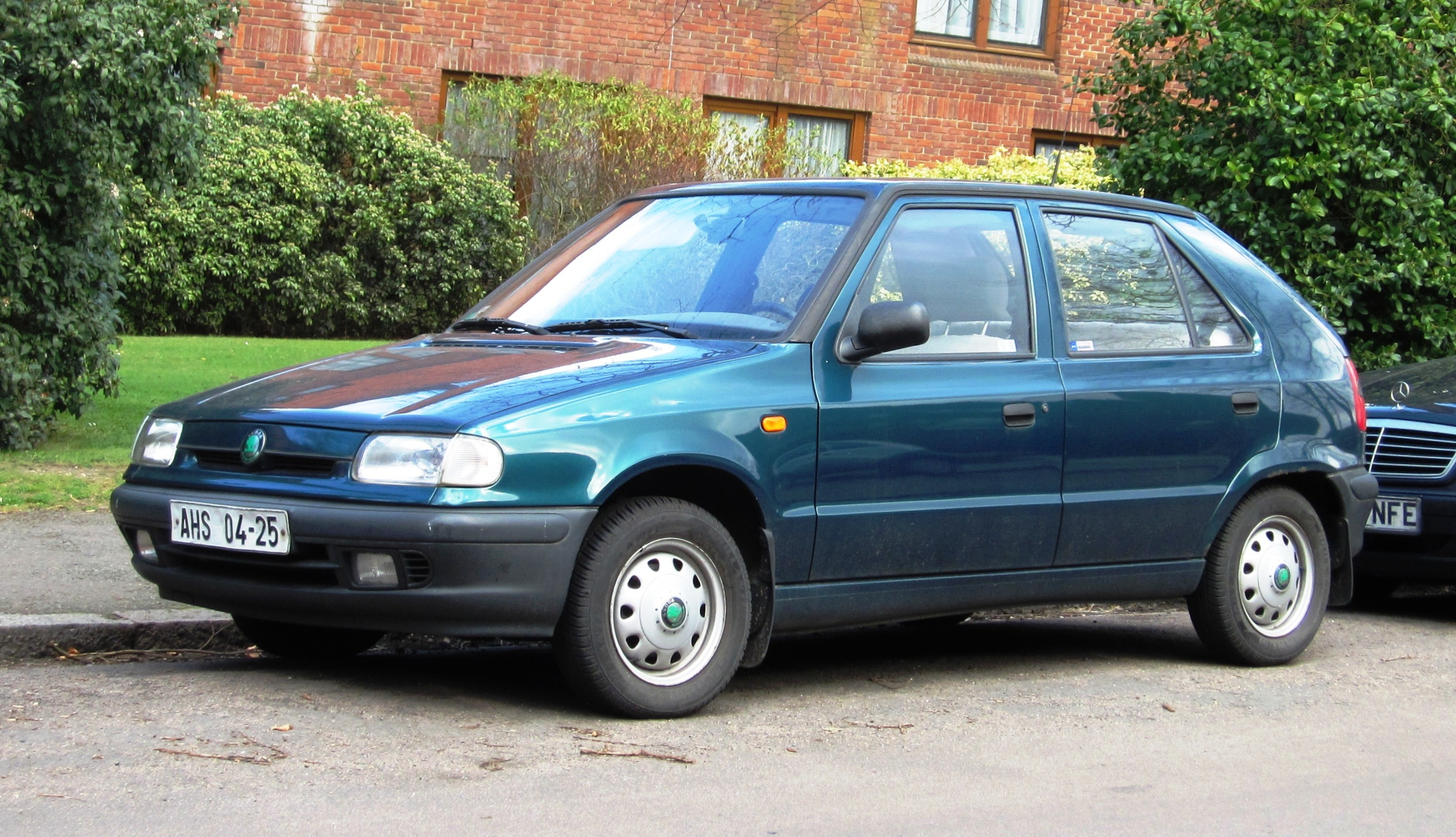

Overview
- Manufacturer: Škoda Auto
- Also called: Škoda Pickup; Volkswagen Caddy (9U)
- Production: 1994–2001 (Czech Republic, Poland); 1998–2001 (Bosnia and Herzegovina); 1996 (China)
- Assembly: Vrchlabí, Czech Republic; Mladá Boleslav, Czech Republic; Kvasiny, Czech Republic; Poznań, Poland; Sarajevo, Bosnia and Herzegovina

Body and chassis
- Class: Supermini (B); Light commercial vehicle
- Body style: 5-door hatchback 5-door estate 2-door coupé utility (pick up); 2-door panel van
- Layout: Front-engine, front-wheel-drive
- Related: Volkswagen Caddy

Powertrain
- Engine: 1.3 L I4 (petrol); 1.6 L I4 (petrol); 1.9 L I4 (diesel)
- Transmission: 5-speed manual

Dimensions
- Wheelbase: 2,450 mm (96.5 in)
- Length: 3,855 mm (151.8 in) (hatchback); 4,205 mm (165.6 in) (estate)
- Width: 1,635 mm (64.4 in)
- Height: 1,415 mm (55.7 in) (hatchback); 1,420 mm (55.9 in) (estate)
- Kerb weight: 920–1,060 kg (2,028–2,337 lb)

Chronology
- Predecessor: Škoda Favorit/Forman
- Successor: Škoda Fabia; Škoda Roomster/Praktik (for utility variants)

The Škoda Felicia (Typ 781 and 791) is a supermini car (B-segment) produced by the Czech carmaker Škoda Auto from 1994 to 2001. It was the last model on Škoda's own platform, but was one of the first models to benefit from Škoda Auto's takeover by the German company Volkswagen Group. The Felicia was a heavily reworked version of the Favorit, retaining its core structure but with new outer panelwork to give it a fresh, more modern appearance, with a redesigned front end and a wider range of VW-sourced engines.

It was premiered in October 1994, on the Charles Bridge in Prague. Serial production of the hatchback began in October 1994, the Combi in June 1995, and the pick up in August 1995. Production ended in June 2001.

The Felicia name had been originally used by Škoda between 1959 and 1964 for a range of two seater sports cars.

== History ==
As the Felicia benefited from Volkswagen input, it helped to elevate Škoda's image in Western Europe. It heralded the first ever diesel powered Škoda, and became their first car to feature major safety and convenience features. Some SLXi models featured air conditioning and velour upholstery. Anti-lock Braking System (ABS), drivers airbag, and seat belt tensioners were also available.

The Felicia made headlines in April 1998, after its high satisfaction score gave Škoda the "Best Manufacturer" accolade in that year's J.D. Power Car Survey. Production of the Felicia ceased at the end of June 2001, one year after the launch of the Fabia. A total of 1,420,489 cars had been made (the pick up and estate models were available for sale throughout 2001), including 19,000 rebranded pick up sold as Volkswagen.

== Body styles ==
The Felicia came in a variety of body styles, both for personal and professional use. The base model was a five door hatchback, and from June 1995, was accompanied by an estate, replacing the Favorit-based Forman, now redubbed as the Felicia Combi (Typ 795).

There was also a coupe utility version, the Felicia Pickup, (Typ 797) and a panel van called a Felicia Vanplus. Pickup featured redesigned rear axle to increase space in cargo area. The pickup version was also imported to some countries re branded as the Volkswagen Caddy Pickup. The pick up model also had a lifestyle edition named the Felicia Fun, (Typ 796) conceived mostly for the market in Western Europe.

The rear screen section hinges out into the loadbay, allowing two extra seats to be folded out, giving comfortable seating for four adults. A tonneau cover is available to cover the rear seats, which are otherwise open to the elements. A Truckman top is also available which encloses the rear seats and loadbay, making for a more practical bad weather conversion.

Luggage capacity in the hatchback was 272 litres with the rear seats in the upright position, and this increased to 976 litres with the rear seats folded. For the Combi (estate version), this was 447 and 1,366 litres respectively. The Felicia and Felicia Combi received a minor facelift in January 1998.

The most obvious visual change was a redesigned radiator grille and larger bumpers, but changes also included minor upgrades to the chassis and bodyshell to improve crash safety.

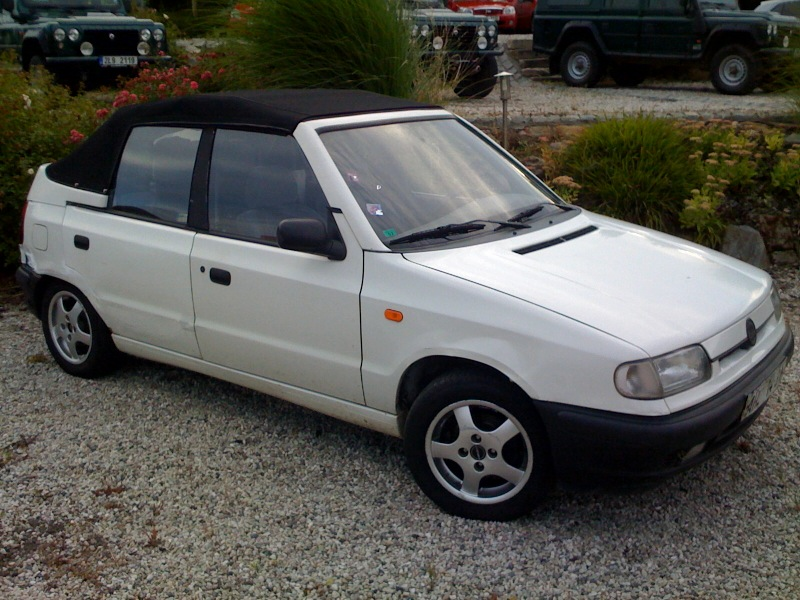
MTX Cabrio

MTX produced a four door cabriolet version, the MTX Cabrio.

== United Kingdom ==
Three years after its launch in the United Kingdom, in April 1998, the Felicia made the headlines with an excellent rating in a Top Gear customer satisfaction survey for N registered cars (sold from August 1995 to July 1996), resulting in the Škoda brand making headlines as the most satisfying brand of car to own, which helped end Skoda's previous reputation in Britain for producing crude, and supposedly unreliable and unfashionable cars. The Felicia received high ratings for reliability, build quality and dealer service.

These strong showings in motoring surveys have continued with the newer generations of Skoda models. The Felicia's successor, the Fabia, went on sale in the United Kingdom in the beginning of 2000, but the Felicia continued to be imported there until the end of the year, by which time more than 76,000 had been sold, and by August 2011, almost 30,000 examples were still registered on the road.

== Powertrain ==
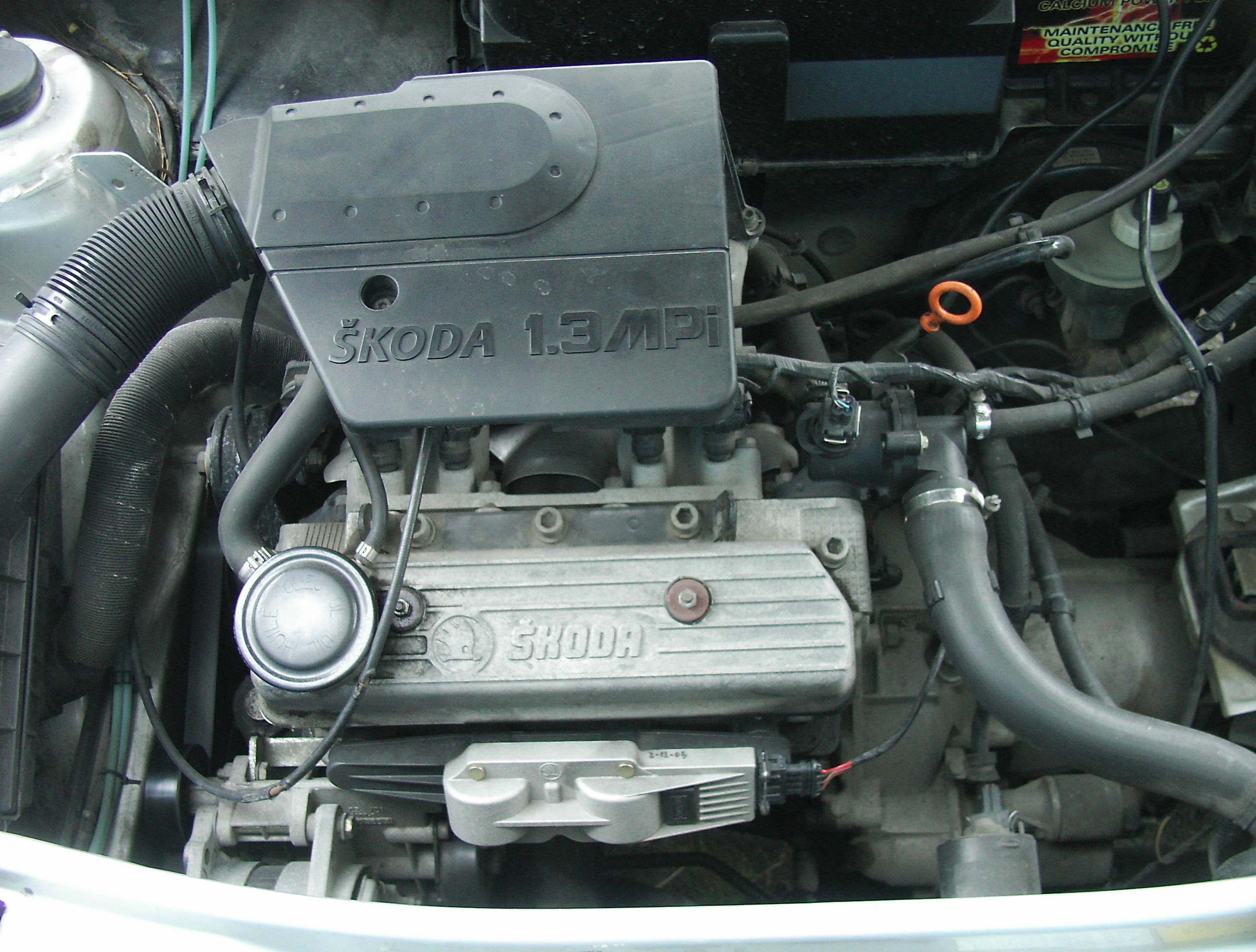
1.3 MPI Engine

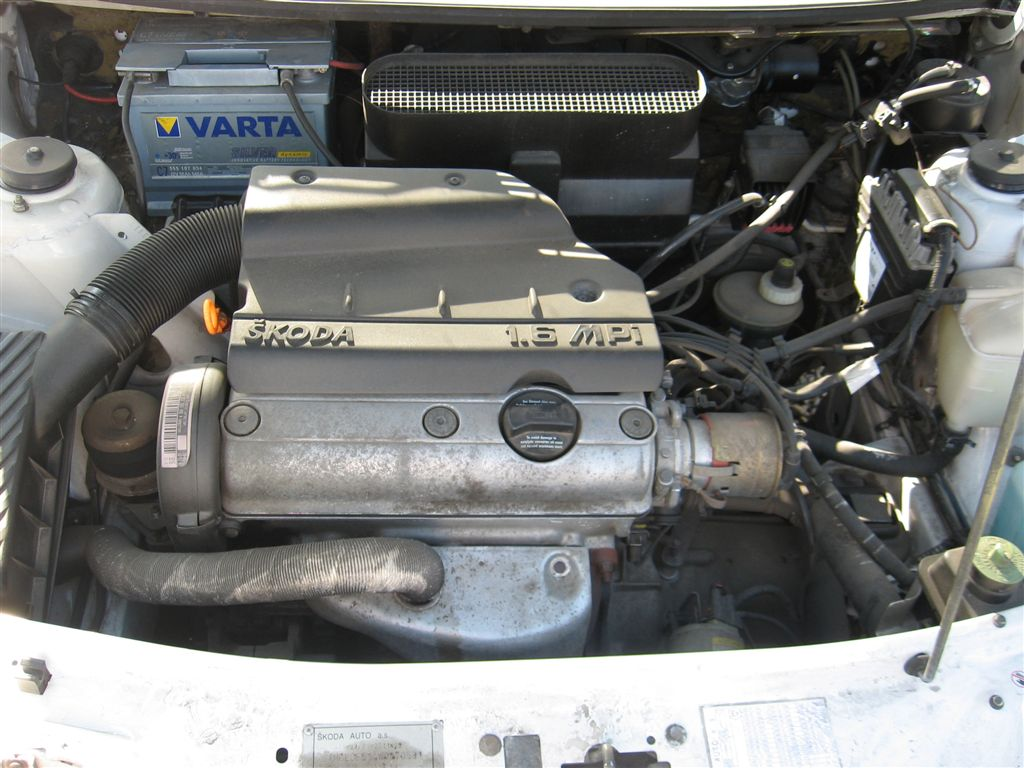
1.6 MPI Engine

All internal combustion engines used in Felicia are inline four-cylinder designs, operate on the four-stroke cycle, are fuel injected, and water cooled. Also a four-cylinder carburetor engine (43 kW) was available in some countries. The fundamental layout of the Felicia's powertrain included engines mounted at the front of the vehicle, and orientated transversely.

The line up included the old 1.3 litre overhead valve (OHV) Škoda petrol engines, now with Bosch Mono Motronic single point fuel injection (up until 1997), and Siemens multi-point fuel injection, with two rated power outputs of 40 kW (54 PS; 54 bhp) and 50 kW (68 PS; 67 bhp).

There were also two engines sourced from Volkswagen Group: a 55 kW (75 PS; 74 bhp) 1.6 litre petrol engine with Magneti Marelli multi point fuel injection, and a 47 kW (64 PS; 63 bhp) 1.9 D diesel engine. The 1.6 litre model served as a homologation basis for the Škoda Felicia Kit Car used in the World Rally Championship's F2 class.

For the Felicia, Škoda had developed its own 75 kW (102 PS; 101 bhp) aluminium 1.6 OHC engine, which appeared in some Favorit prototypes and Rally cars, but Volkswagen decided to use its old 1.6MPI 55 kW (75 PS; 74 bhp) The only transmission was a five speed manual gearbox, which was of a transaxle design, and contained the differential and final drive units. Drive was through the front wheels.

=== Specifications ===
Engine code	Displacement, valvetrain, fuel system	Max. power at rpm	Max. torque at rpm	Years
Petrol engines
Š 781.135B	1289 cc, 8v overhead valve (OHV); Bosch Mono Motronic single-point fuel injection	40 kW (54 PS; 54 bhp) at 5,000	94 N⋅m (69 lb⋅ft) at 3,250	1994–1997
Š 781.136B	1289 cc, 8v overhead valve (OHV); Bosch Mono Motronic single-point fuel injection	50 kW (68 PS; 67 bhp) at 5,000	94 N⋅m (69 lb⋅ft) at 3,250	1994–1997
Š 781.135M	1289 cc, 8v overhead valve (OHV); Siemens multi-point fuel injection (MPI)	40 kW (54 PS; 54 bhp) at 5,500	99 N⋅m (73 lb⋅ft) at 2,600-3,750	1997–2001
Š 781.136M	1289 cc, 8v overhead valve (OHV); Siemens multi-point fuel injection (MPI)	50 kW (68 PS; 67 bhp) at 5,500	106 N⋅m (78 lb⋅ft) at 2,600-3,750	1997–2001
AEE 1,6 MPI	1598 cc, 8v single overhead camshaft (SOHC); Magneti Marelli multi-point fuel injection (MPI)	55 kW (75 PS; 74 bhp) at 4,500	137 N⋅m (101 lb⋅ft) at 3,500	1995–2001
Diesel engine
AEF 1,9 D	1896 cc, 8v single overhead camshaft (SOHC); Lucas LS4000 distributor injection pump, indirect injection with swirl chamber	47 kW (64 PS; 63 bhp) at 4,300	124 N⋅m (91 lb⋅ft) at 2,500-3,500	1995–2001

== Gallery ==
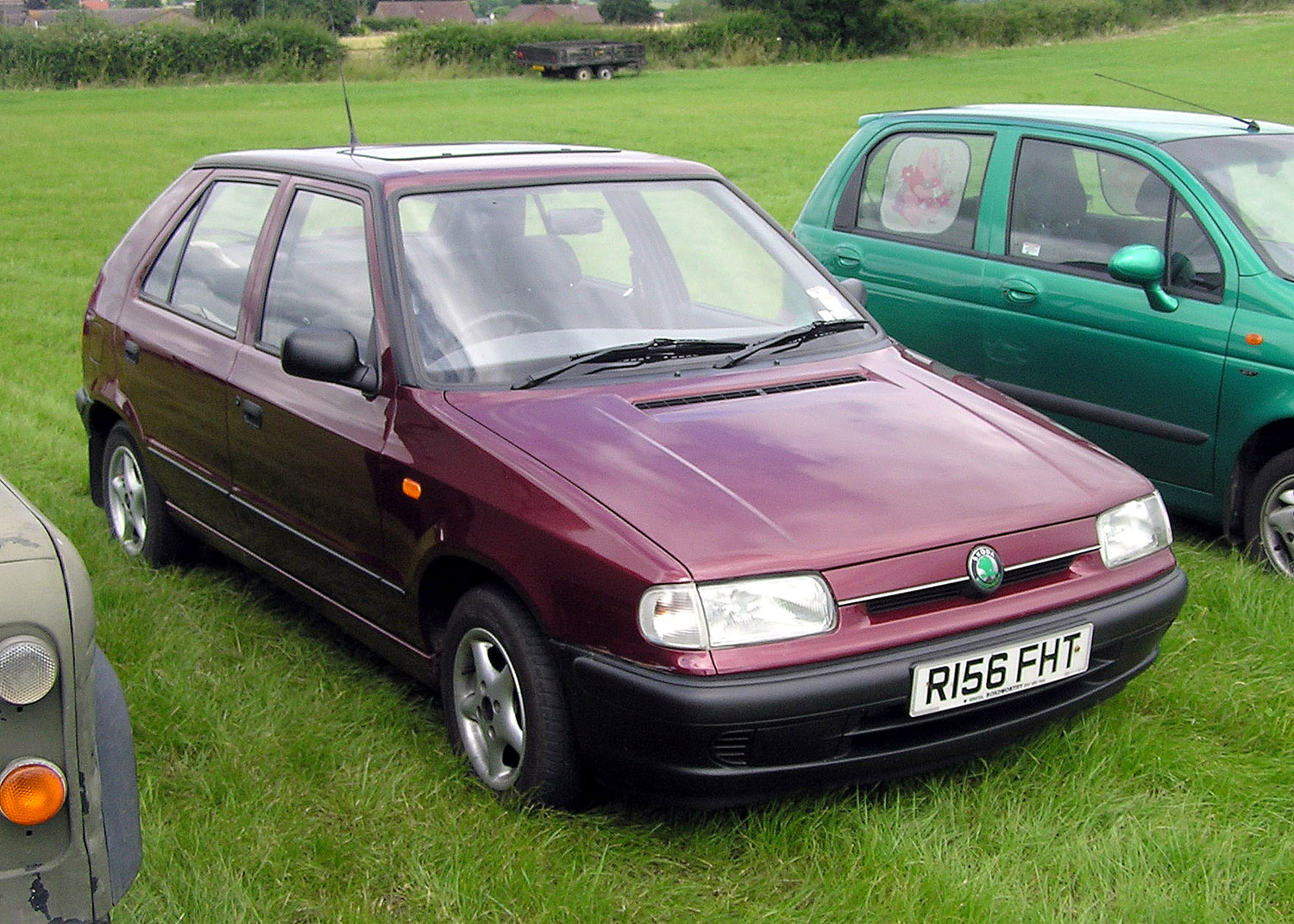
Škoda Felicia (from 1997)

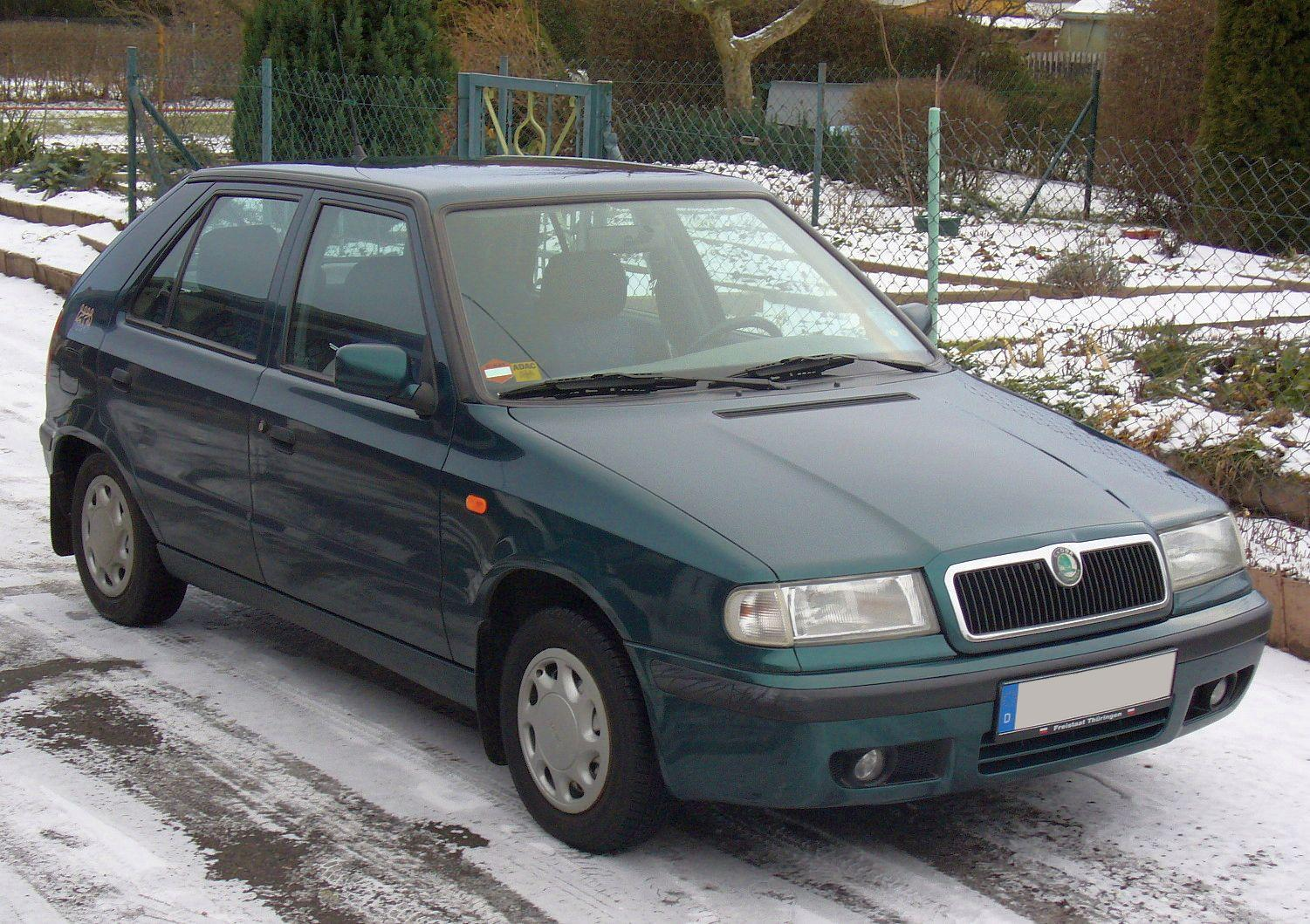
Škoda Felicia (from 1998)

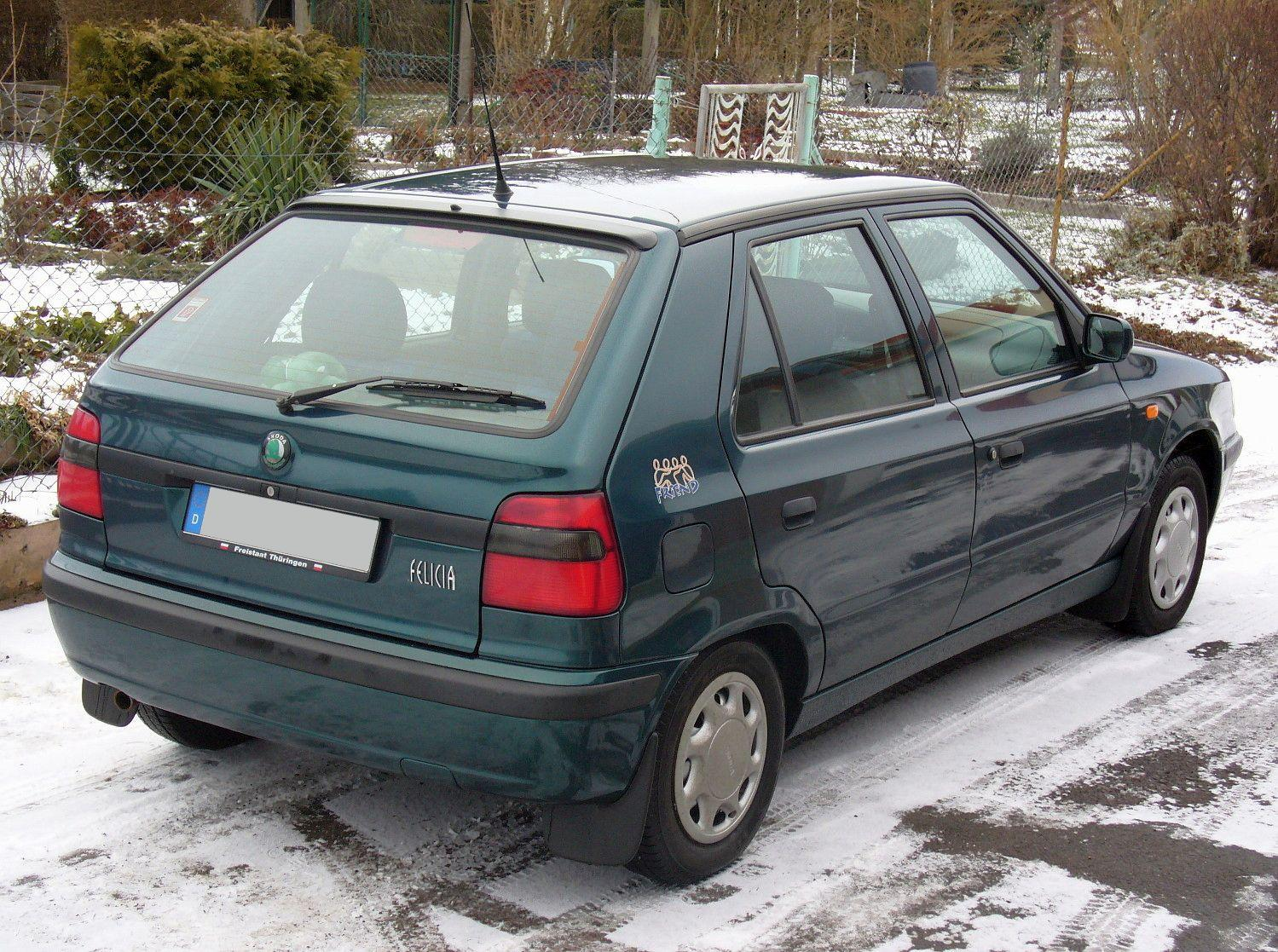
Škoda Felicia (from 1998)

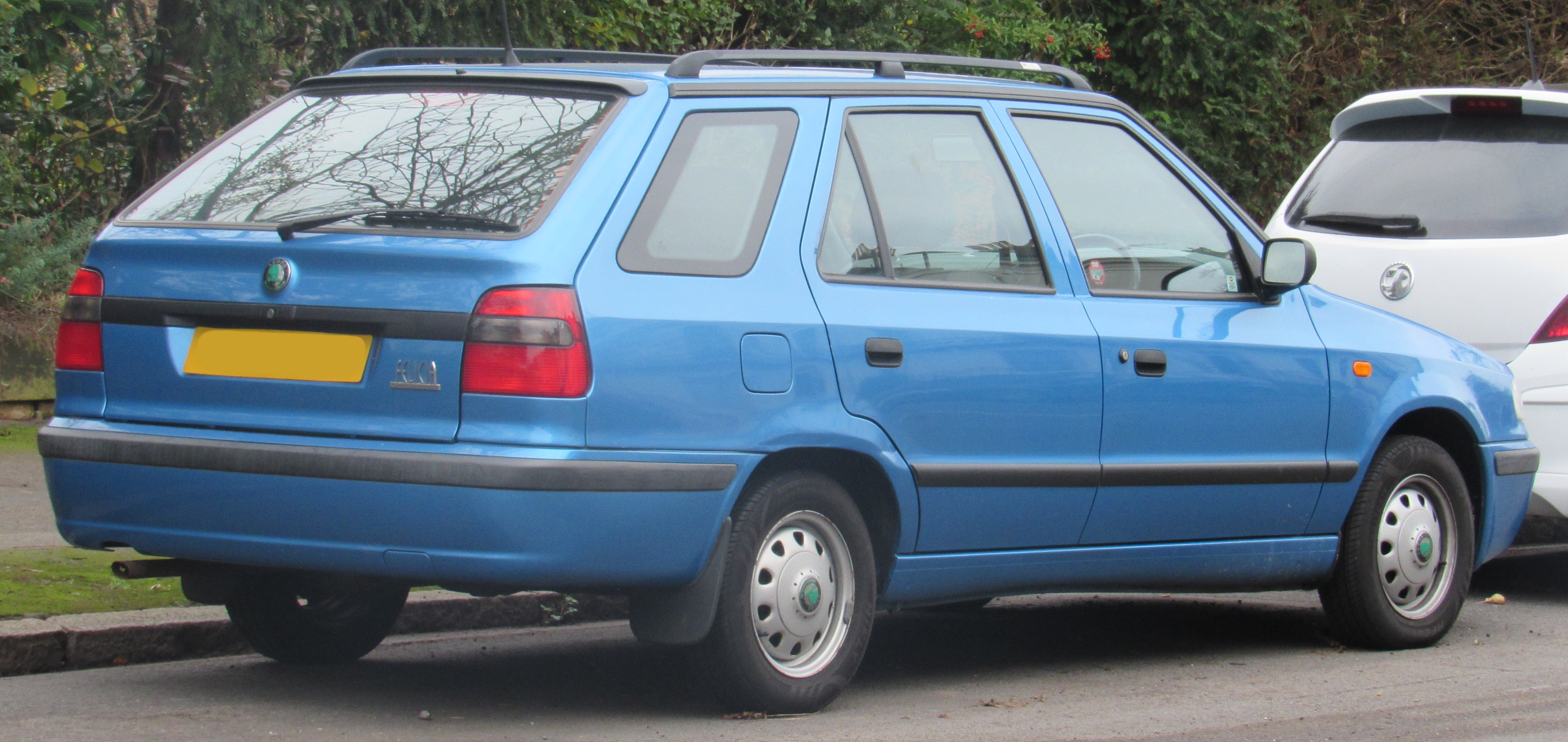
Škoda Felicia Combi

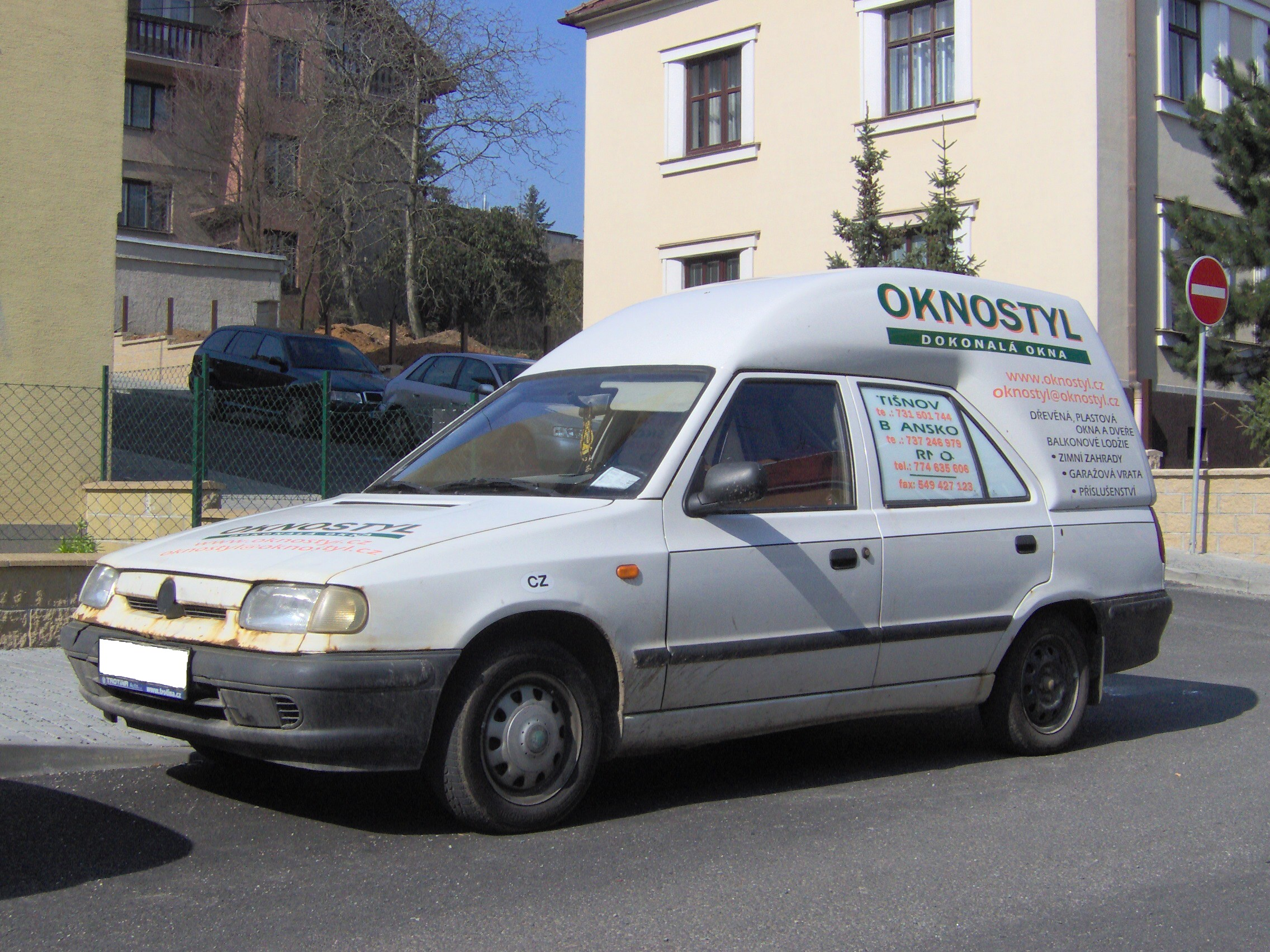
Škoda Felicia Vanplus

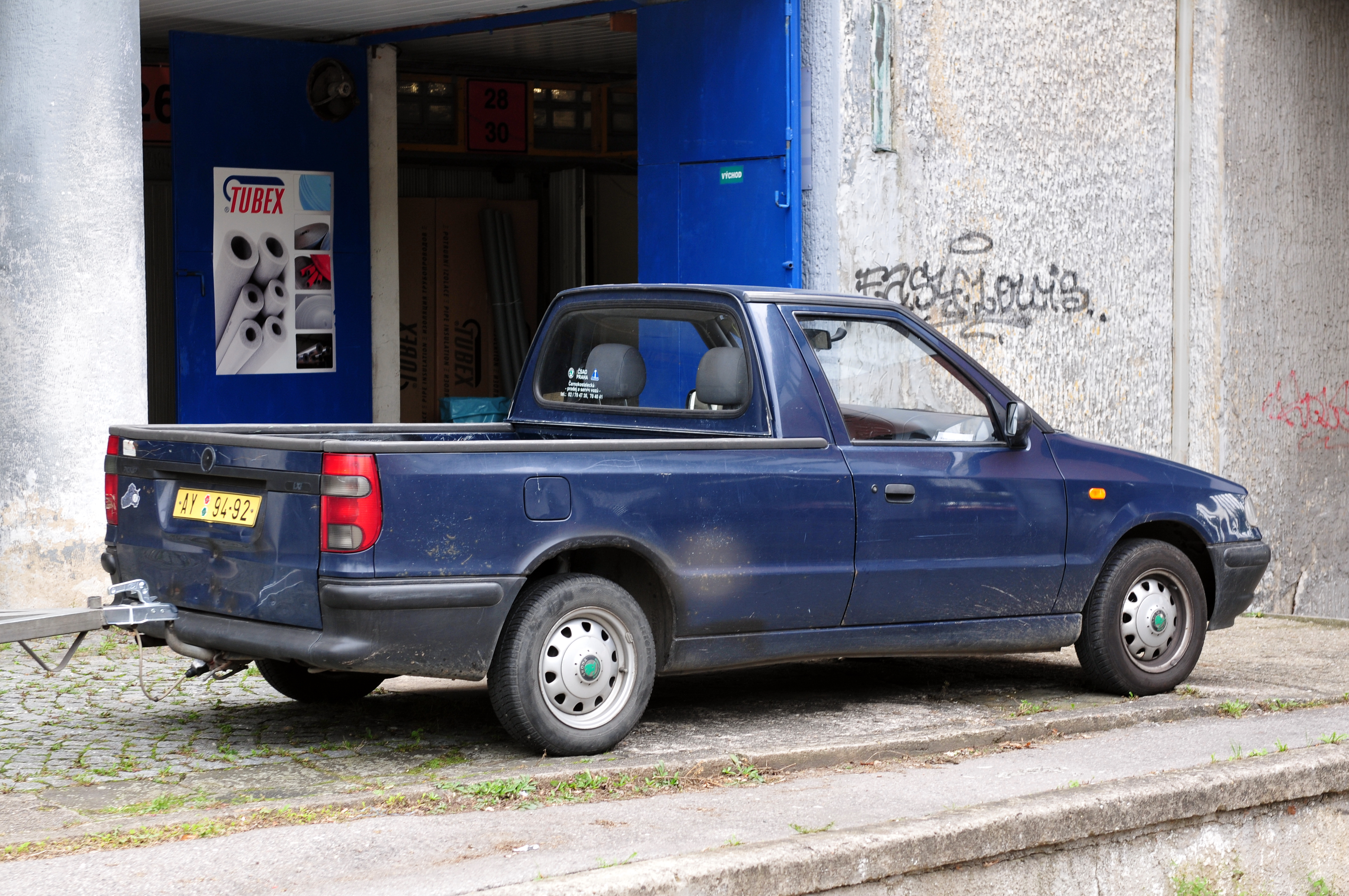
Škoda Pickup

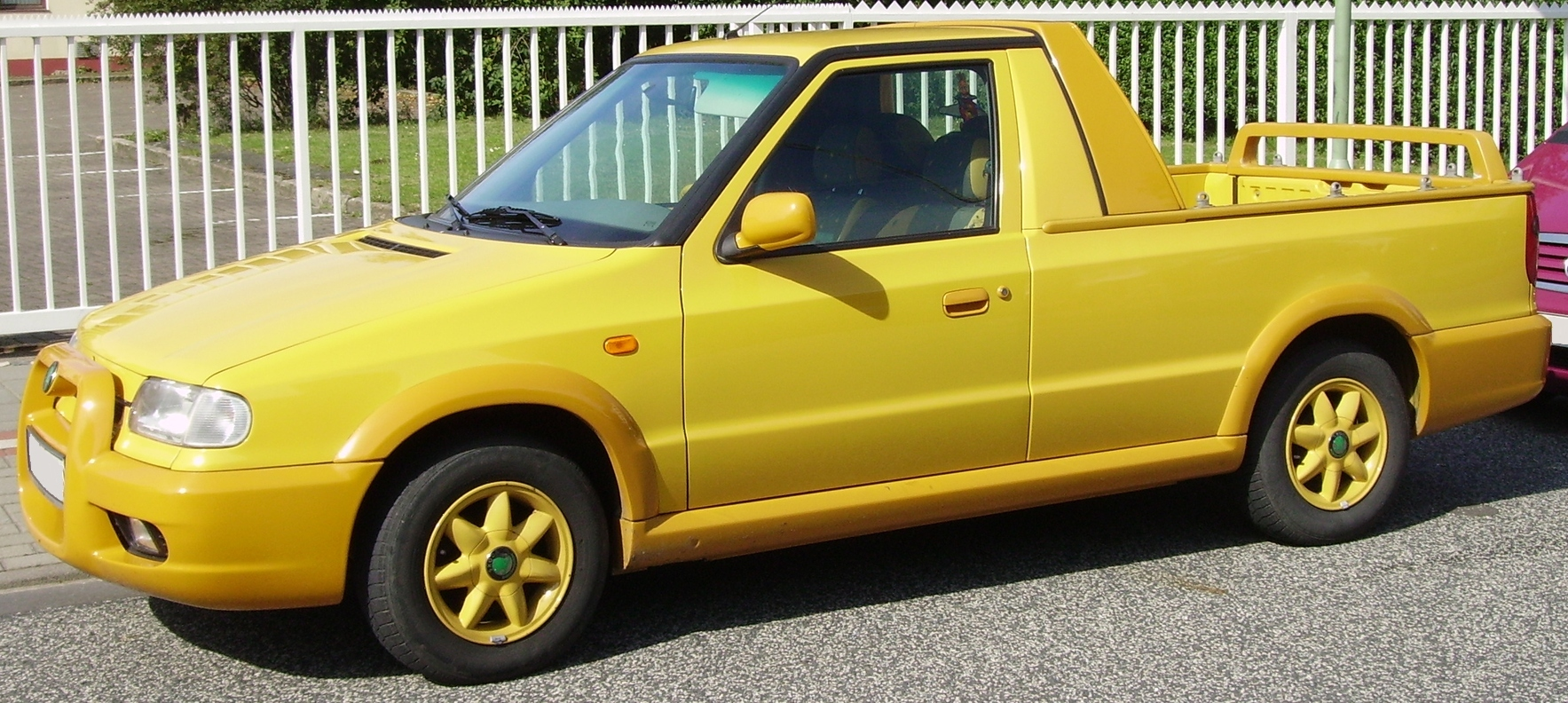
Škoda Felicia Fun

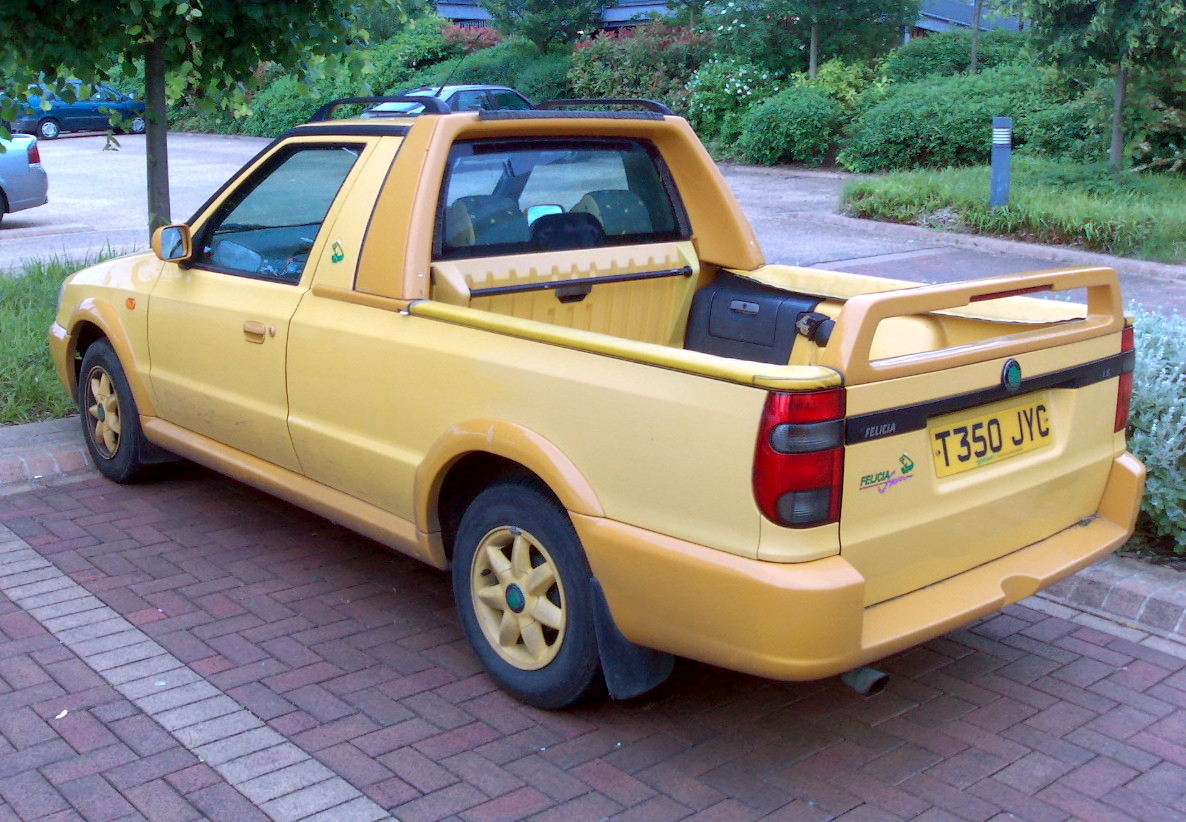
Škoda Felicia Fun

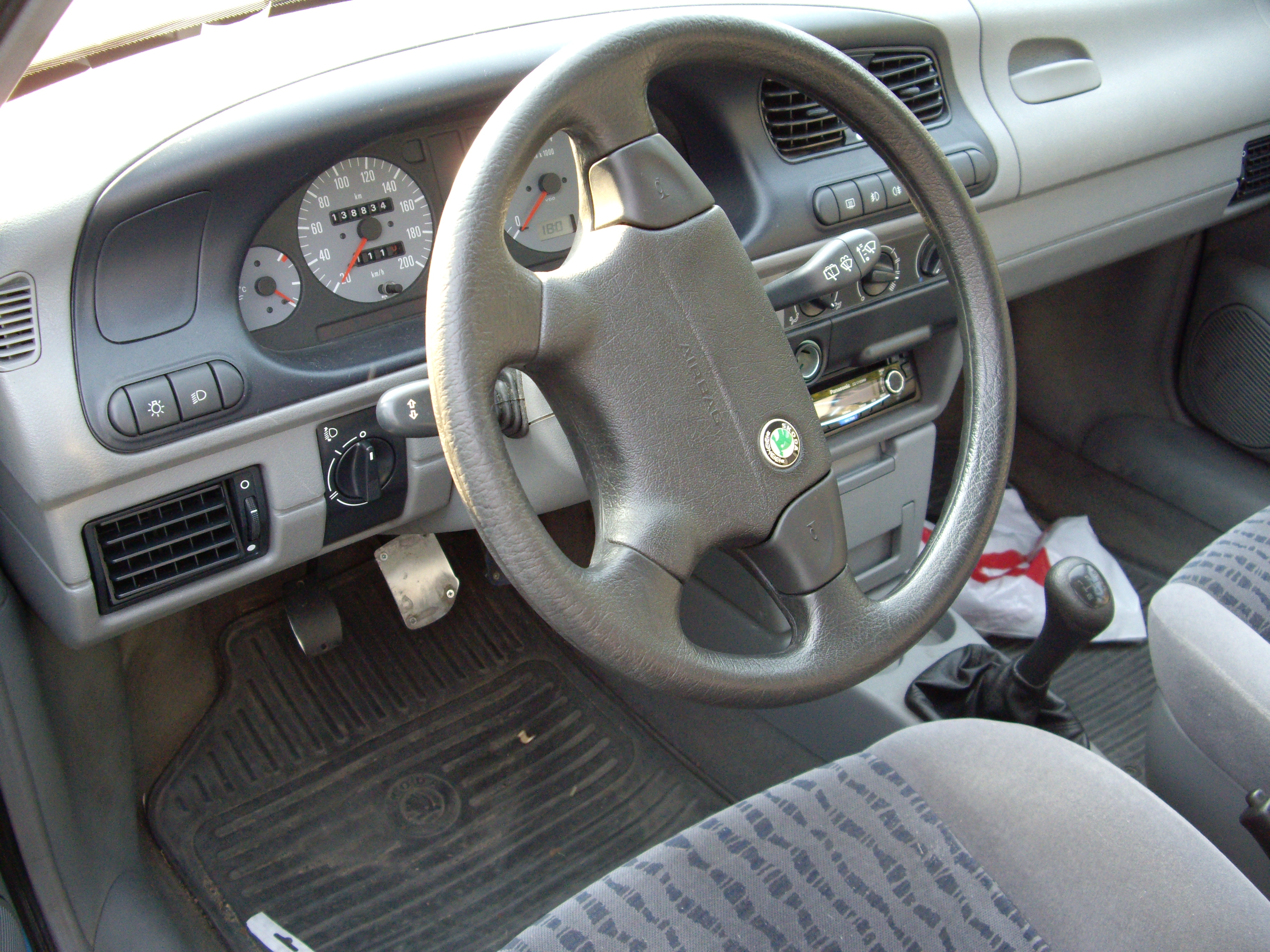
Škoda Felicia (interior)

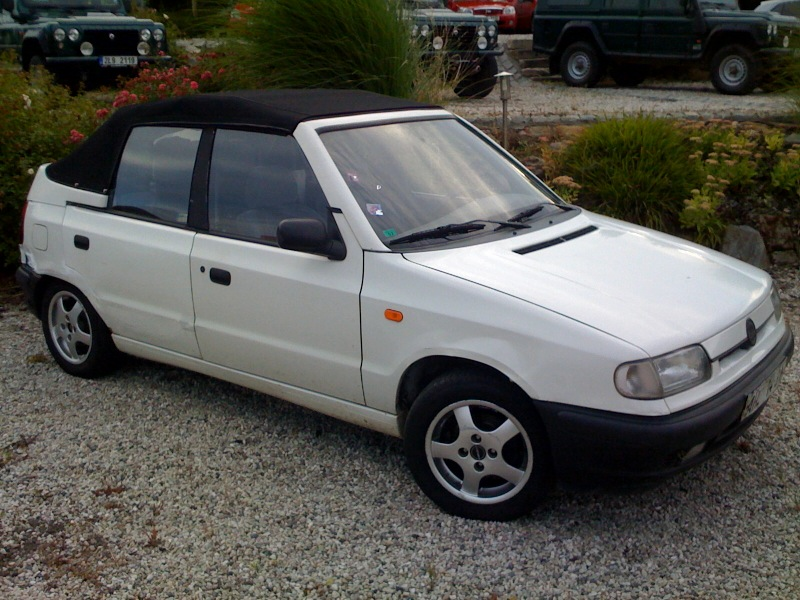
Felicia mtx
