= Skopak =

Overview
- Manufacturer: Haroon Industries Ltd.
- Production: May 1970 – 1971
- Assembly: Pakistan: Karachi
- Designer: Josef Velebný (technical design)

Body and chassis
- Body style: Two-seat pick-up
- Related: Škoda Octavia (1959)

Powertrain
- Engine: 1221 cc I4

Dimensions
- Length: 4,200 mm (165.4 in)
- Width: 1,640 mm (64.6 in)
- Height: 1,250 mm (49.2 in)

The Skopak was a multi-purpose vehicle developed in-house in Pakistan, built on the chassis of the Škoda Octavia.

Initially, the plan was for the body to be made from flat metal sheets. Ultimately, it was made from fiberglass-reinforced plastic because it was cheaper to produce that way. Prototypes were developed in 1969. Series production ran from May 1970 to spring 1971. The basic version was an open pickup with two seats. A fabric roof, side windows, and hardtop were available at extra cost. A utility version offered more space for passengers and luggage. The vehicle was powered by a four-cylinder engine with 1,221 cc displacement and 34.5 kW (46.3 hp) of power.

== History ==
Haroon Industries Ltd. (also spelled Haron Industries Ltd.), based in Karachi, initially operated as an importer of Škoda automobiles and Zetor tractors. In 1965, the company began local automobile production, assembling the Škoda 1000 MB from imported kits.

In 1967, the company explored the idea of a multi-purpose vehicle, and imported a Trekka from New Zealand as part of the evaluation process. However, the vehicle was never put into production in Pakistan. By 1970, the company introduced its own proprietary model, branded as the Skopak. Production of the Skopak lasted until 1971, with approximately 1,400 units manufactured.
