= Trekka =

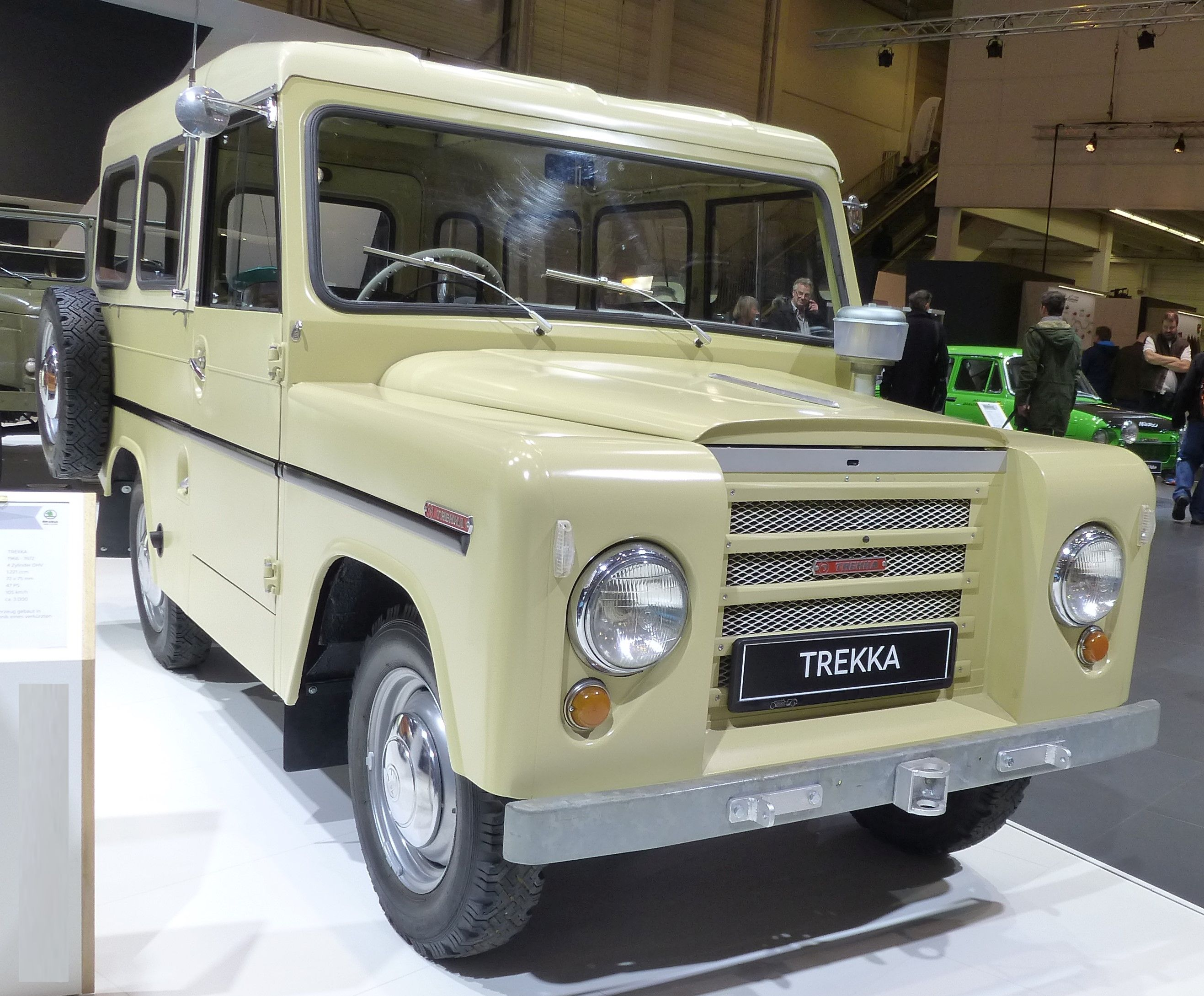

Overview
- Manufacturer: Motor Holdings
- Also called: Škoda Trekka
- Production: 1966–1972
- Assembly: New Zealand: Ōtāhuhu; Indonesia: Surabaya (PT. IMER)
- Designer: Josef Velebný & George Taylor

Body and chassis
- Class: Off-road vehicle
- Body style: 2-door SUV; 2-door pickup
- Layout: Front-engine, rear-wheel-drive
- Related: Škoda Octavia (1959); Skopak

Powertrain
- Engine: Petrol: 1.1 L I4; 1.2 L I4
- Transmission: 4-speed manual

Dimensions
- Wheelbase: 2,400 mm (94.5 in)
- Length: 4,065 mm (160.0 in)
- Width: 1,549 mm (61.0 in)
- Height: 1,867 mm (73.5 in)

The Trekka was a light utility vehicle built on the basis of the Czech Škoda Octavia, manufactured in New Zealand between 1966 and 1972. It is the only vehicle designed and manufactured in New Zealand to have entered commercial production for an extended period.

== Overview ==
=== Development ===
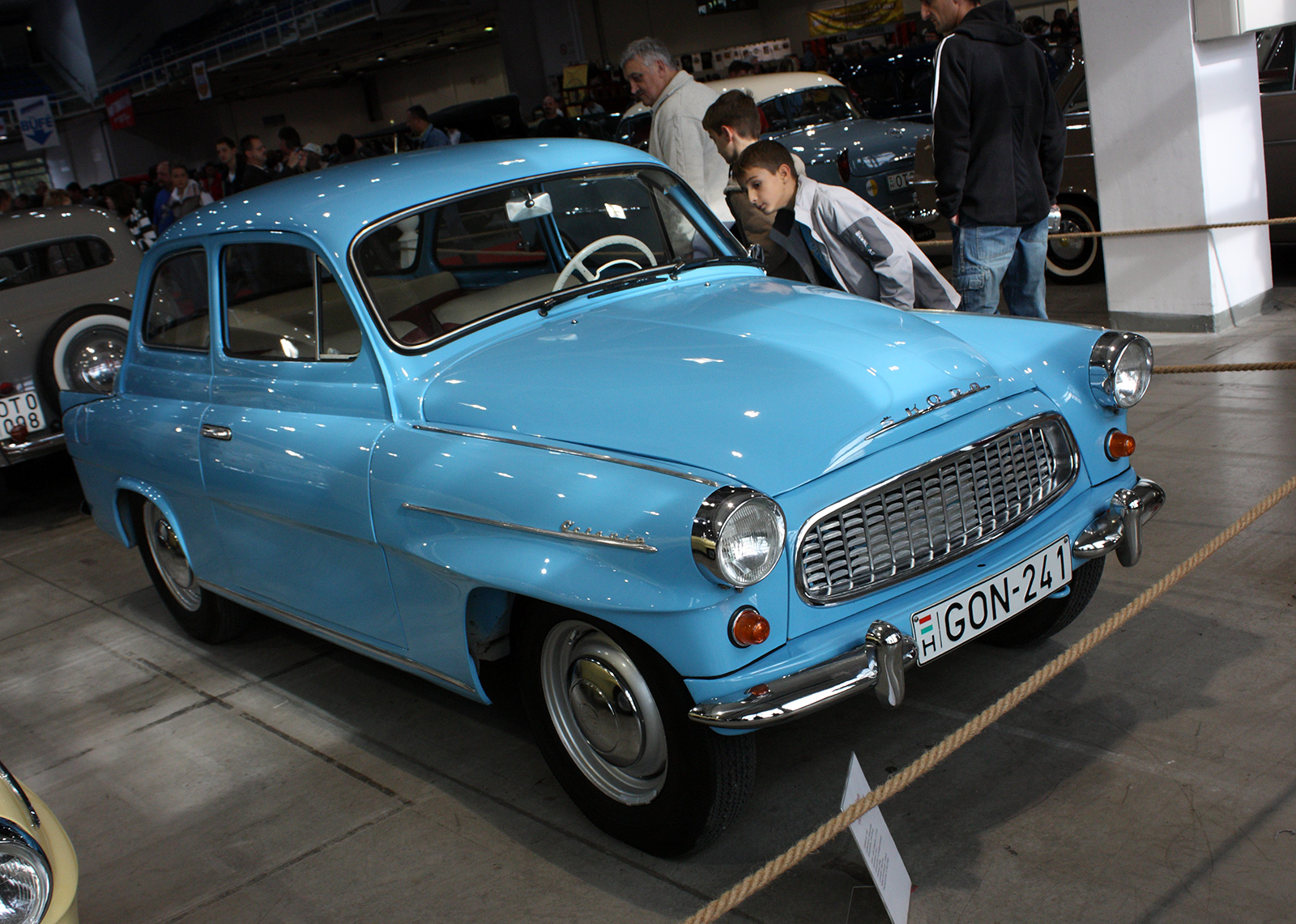
Škoda Octavia

The idea for an agricultural utility vehicle based on the Škoda Octavia engine, drive train and separate chassis came from Philip Andrews, who had taken over the Motor Lines vehicle assembly company from his father. When Motor Lines was taken over by Noel Turner, Andrews was able to convince him of the market potential of such a vehicle. At that time in New Zealand agricultural vehicles attracted no tariffs and there was no government limit on the number of such vehicles that could be sold.

Turner discovered that a prototype of a small utility vehicle had been made by an engineering company in Kawerau using an engine based on a British Bradford. Peter Risbridge, who ran the Kawerau engineering company, allowed the prototype to be taken to Motor Lines in Auckland, expecting it to be developed in joint venture with his company. Instead, according to reference, Motor Lines developed and produced the Skoda-powered Trekka from it with no payment whatever being made to Risbridge.

Overseen by Colin French, manager of Motor Lines from 1966, the Trekka project began with two hand-built prototypes using the rear-wheel drive Škoda Octavia powertrain, which was imported from communist Czechoslovakia and featured a 1,221 cm^{3}, 47 hp (35 kW) four-cylinder engine.

The Trekka superficially resembled a Land Rover but with far more limited off-road capability and was produced in both van and ute formats.

=== Production ===
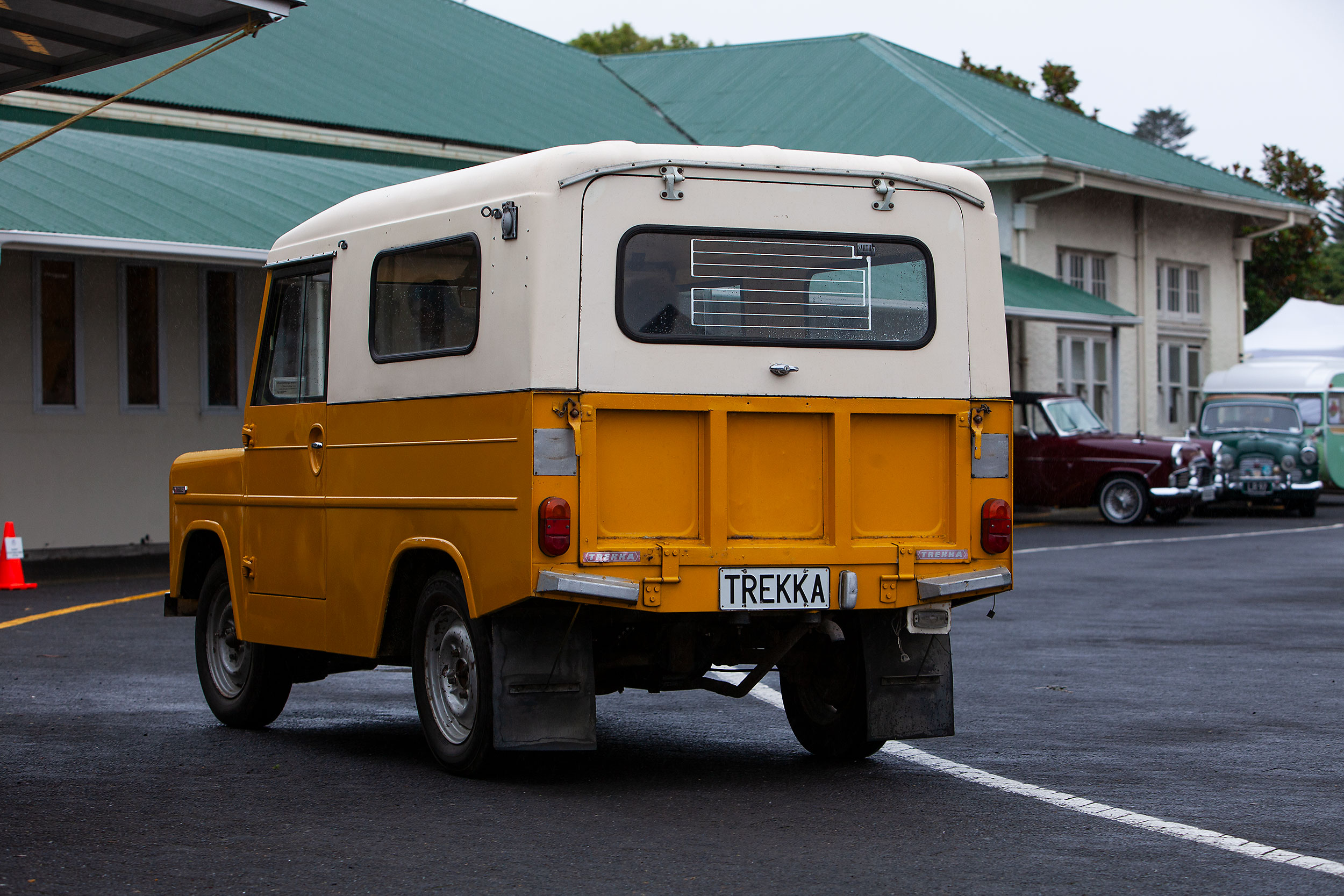
Rear view of a Trekka with the van-style body.

The Trekka was launched on 2 December 1966 as an agricultural vehicle although it eventually became popular with both rural buyers and urban tradesmen. The first Trekkas were sold in New Zealand in 1967, by which time Motor Lines had become Motor Holdings. The first model sold was the "2-10", which cost less than a Morris 1100 at just £899. The 2-10s were all painted green with canvas tops and were offered with a tow bar as the only option.

Initially, the Trekka was produced at a rate of six vehicles a day with hand-formed steel panels. Production output increased after the panel forming was contracted out to H J Ryans, an Auckland manufacturer of lawn mowers. 708 Trekkas were sold in its first year of production and by January 1968 the 1,000th had been manufactured. When production ceased in 1972, some 2,500 had been built.

Buyer demand for a more weather-proof top was answered by a white fibreglass canopy, whose manufacture was outsourced to another Auckland company. These later models were also fitted with improved seats.

The inability of the standard Škoda differential to cope with the frequently slippery conditions on farms and construction sites quickly became obvious. A limited-slip differential was therefore developed for the Trekka by Ray Stone, who had previously developed such units for racing cars.

== Exports ==
Motor Holdings began to look for export markets in 1968, with the first Trekkas exported going to Fiji. In subsequent months, other Pacific island states imported some Trekkas.

Exports to Australia became a matter of urgency when it became known that Motokov in Czechoslovakia (holding group of Škoda) planned to build a Škoda-based vehicle in Australia. The Australia and New Zealand governments agreed that up to 720 Trekkas a year could be sold in Australia free of duty, provided New Zealand issued an equal number of extra licences for Holden vehicles to be sold in New Zealand. Australian buyers did not take to the Trekka, cheapness being less of a prerequisite in that country and more robust and powerful alternatives being readily available from local manufacturers, Holden, Ford and Chrysler. Fewer than 100 Trekkas were eventually sold in Australia.

In July 1969, at the height of the American War in Vietnam, five Trekkas were flown into South Vietnam in RNZAF Bristol Freighters. These served as runabouts and sometimes as ambulances with a civilian hospital run by a New Zealand surgical team. Heavy rains and poor roads led to breakdowns. The Trekka was unattractive to black market thieves, who preferred the more ubiquitous and tougher Land Rover and Jeep.

A single Trekka was exported to General Motors in Detroit in 1969, the purpose and outcome of which is unknown.

Exports of CKD Trekkas to Indonesia began in 1971 for assembly there.

Trekkas were exported to Latin America, Caribbean, Arab countries, Africa, Afghanistan, Southeast Asia in 1970s. Trekkas were used as Tap taps in Haiti.

== Market appeal ==
In New Zealand at that time, government regulation made it very difficult to purchase a new car because of restricted import numbers, high tariffs and high deposit requirements for hire purchase. Because the Trekka was 80% New Zealand sourced and sold as an "agricultural vehicle", there were no restrictions on its availability (apart from manufacturer capacity), it was relatively inexpensive and could be bought with a lower deposit than other vehicle types. It was bought in large numbers by local authorities and trades people.

The Trekka is remembered for the unlikely success of its low quality manufacturing and simple design. Despite its flaws, it generally suited the purpose for which it was made.

Once import restrictions were eased and as the economic situation in New Zealand improved, the marginal economics of limited production led to its commercial demise. Ultimately, a Skoda-powered two wheel drive utility vehicle could no longer meet the needs of increasingly affluent rural and construction sectors.

The Trekka has since become something of a New Zealand icon representing the "Kiwi can-do" attitude of the 1960s. It survives as a curiosity in the collections of New Zealand and Australian vehicle collectors.
