= Škoda 440 =

Škoda 440 / 445 / 450
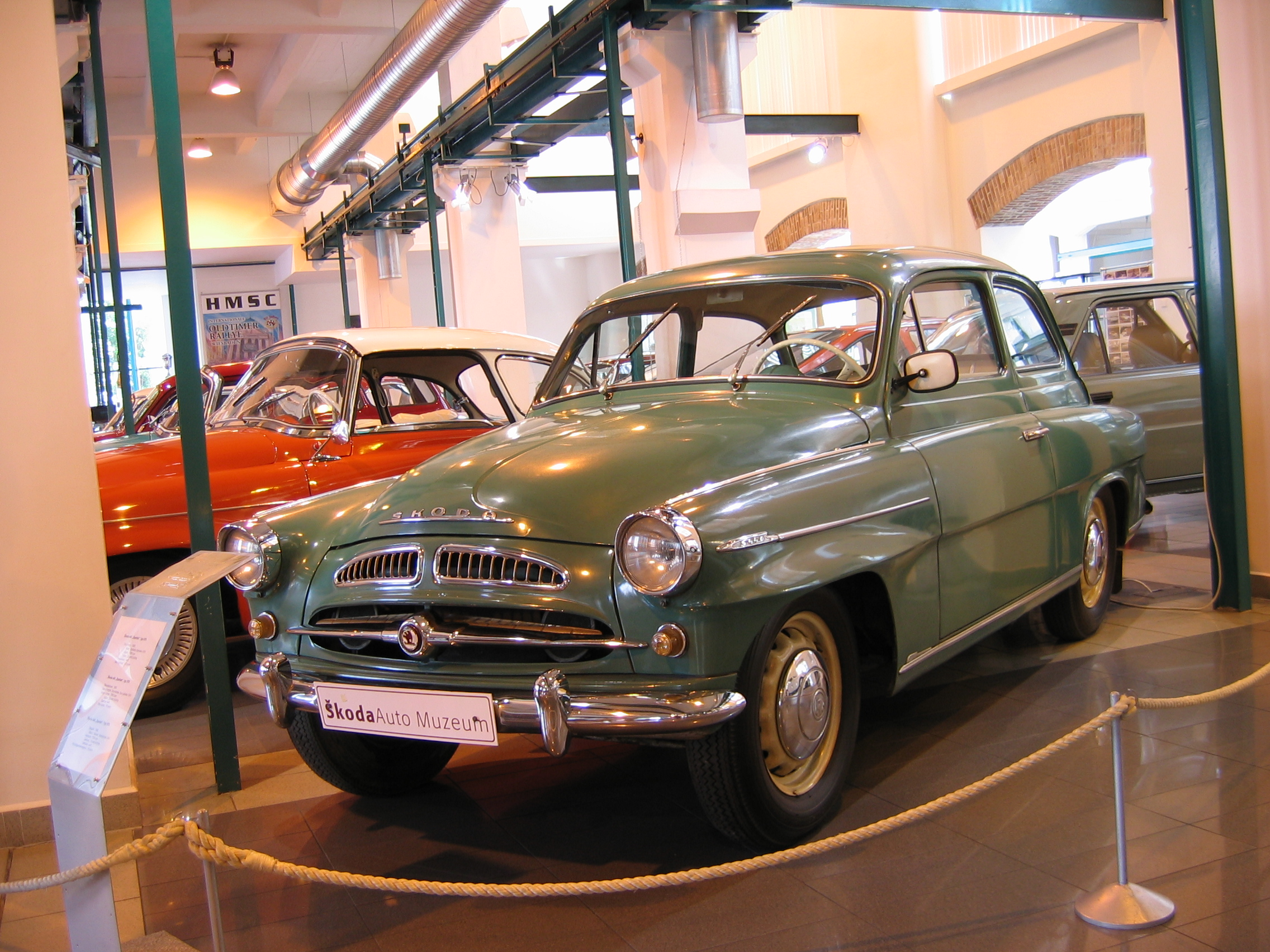

Overview
- Manufacturer: AZNP
- Production: 1955–1959; 85,802 built
- Assembly: Czechoslovakia: Mladá Boleslav

Body and chassis
- Class: Small family car
- Body style: 2-door saloon 3-door estate 2-door convertible (450)
- Layout: FR layout

Powertrain
- Engine: 1.1 L I4; 1.2 L I4

Chronology
- Successor: Škoda Octavia; Škoda Felicia

The Škoda 440 and the similar 445 and 450 are cars that were produced by AZNP in Czechoslovakia between 1955 and 1959. In Czechoslovakia, vehicles were known under popular name Spartak. The cars were also imported to Western Europe, North and South America, and New Zealand.

== Versions ==
The three models are all powered by inline four-cylinder engines.

- 440 Spartak (1955–1959) - 1089 cc, 29 kW (39 PS; 39 hp) at 4,200 rpm, produced 75417 cars
- 445 (1957–1959) - 1221 cc, 33 kW (45 PS; 44 hp) at 4,200 rpm, produced 9375 cars
- 450 Convertible (1957–1959) - 1089 cc, 37 kW (50 PS; 50 hp) at 5,500 rpm, produced 1010 cars

The 440, 445 and 450 were updated in 1959 with the saloons and estate models replaced by Škoda Octavia and the 450 convertible by Škoda Felicia.

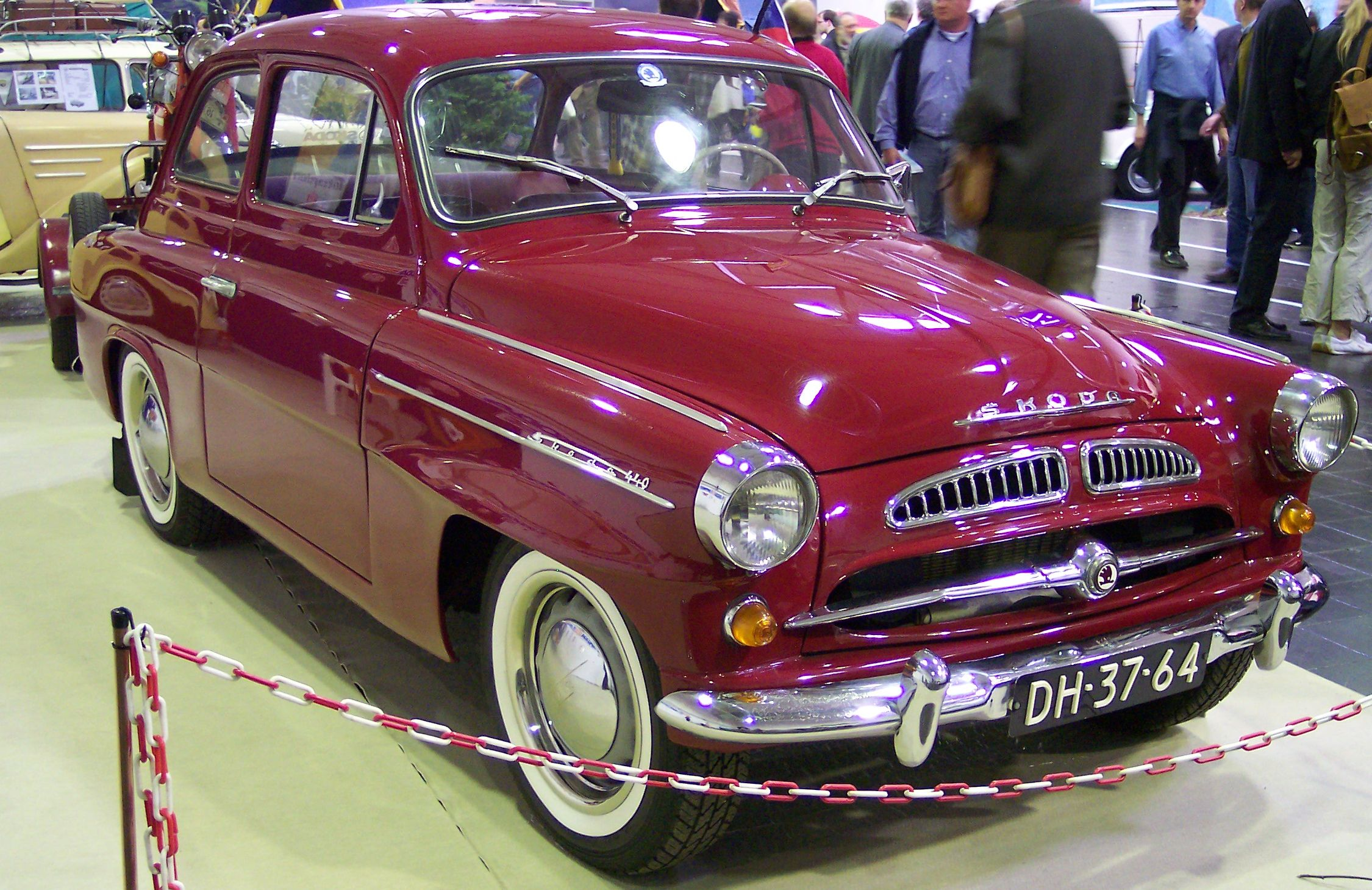
Škoda 440 saloon

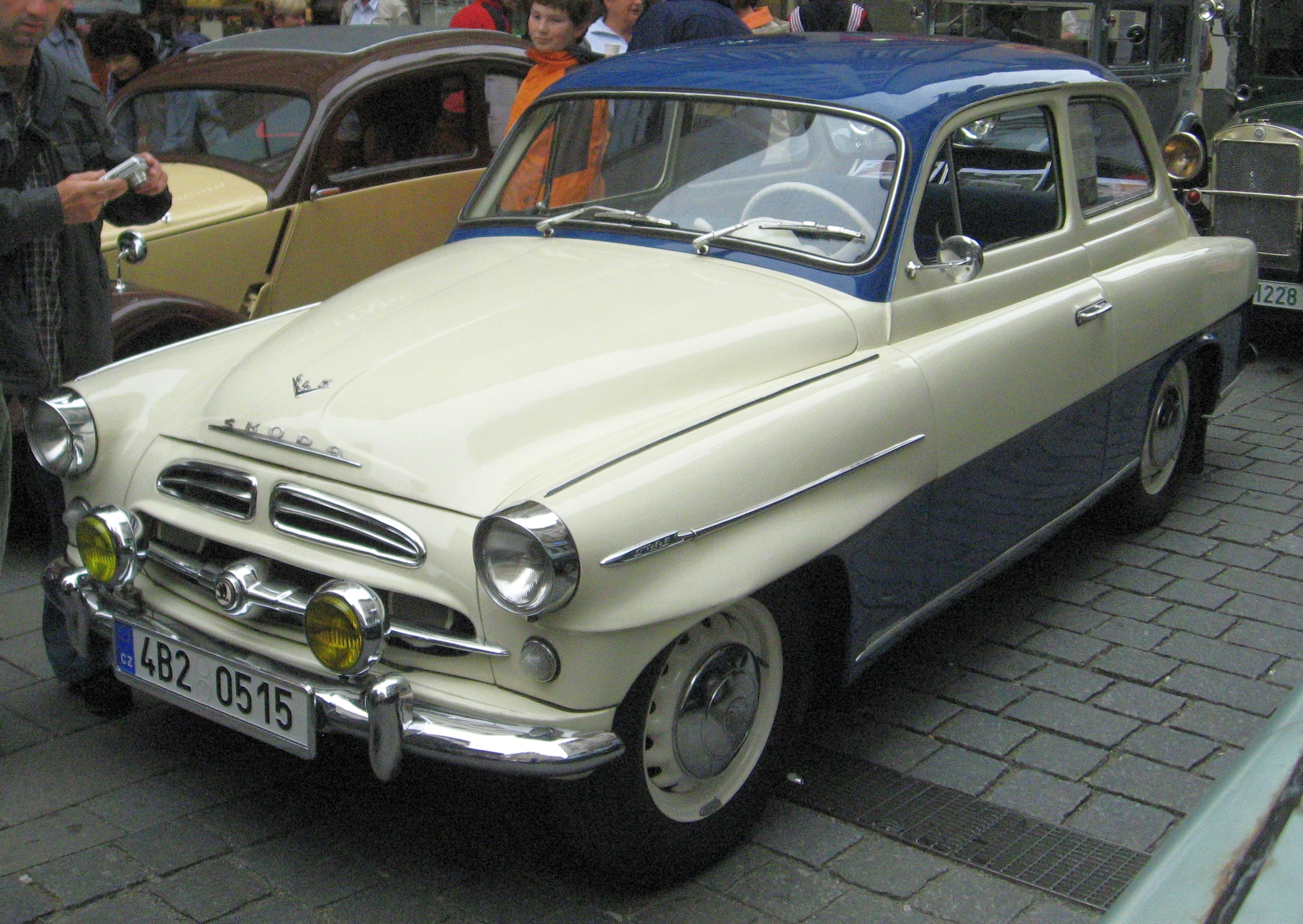
Škoda 445 saloon

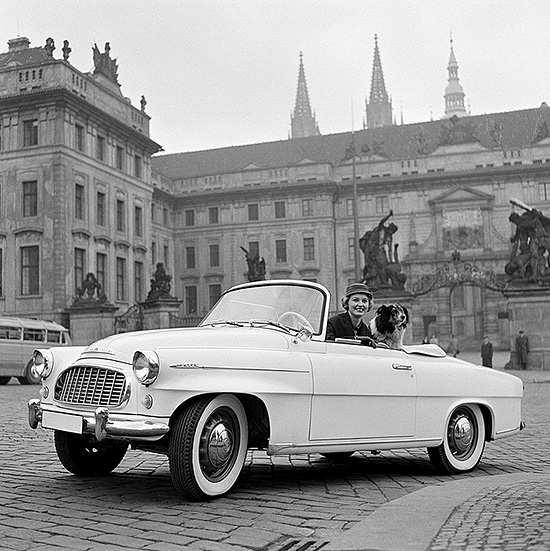
Škoda 450
