= Škoda Felicia (1959–1964) =

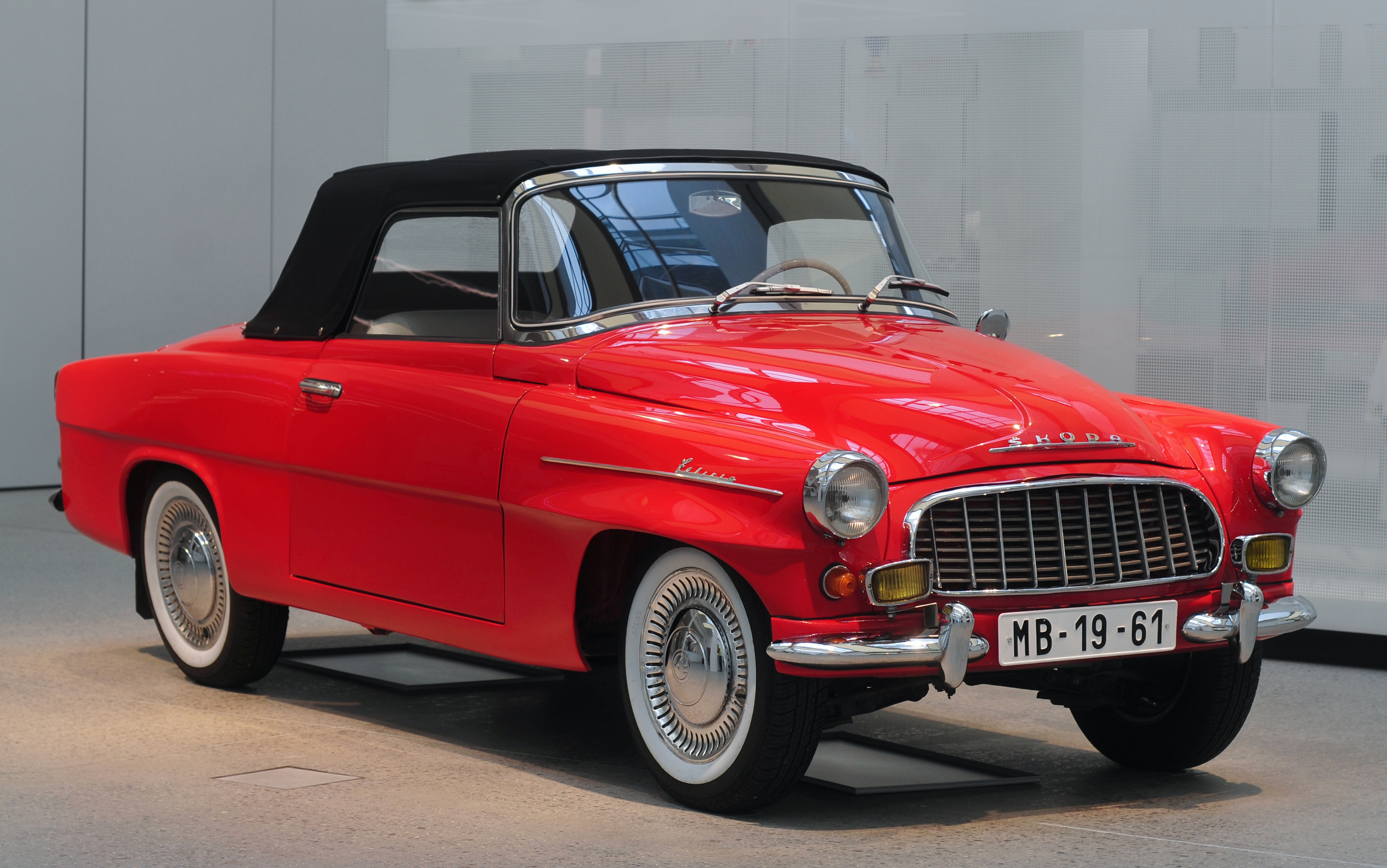

Overview
- Manufacturer: AZNP
- Production: 1959–1964; 14,863 built
- Assembly: Czechoslovakia: Kvasiny

Body and chassis
- Body style: 2-door convertible
- Layout: FR layout
- Related: Škoda Octavia (1959–1971)

Powertrain
- Engine: 1.1 L I4; 1.2 L I4

Chronology
- Predecessor: Škoda 450
- Successor: None

The Škoda Felicia is an automobile which was produced by AZNP from 1959 to 1964.

The Felicia was introduced in 1959 as a 2-door convertible, replacing the Škoda 450. Able to seat five persons, it was equipped with a folding hood and a plastic hardtop. Styling is similar to that of the contemporary Škoda Octavia. The Felicia was offered only with a 1089 cc (37 kW) four-cylinder engine however a Felicia Super model was introduced in 1961 powered by a larger 1221 cc (40 kW) four-cylinder.

The Felicia was exported to Western Europe and North America. A total of 14,863 Felicias were produced. The Felicia name was resurrected by Škoda in 1994 for a new model Škoda Felicia.

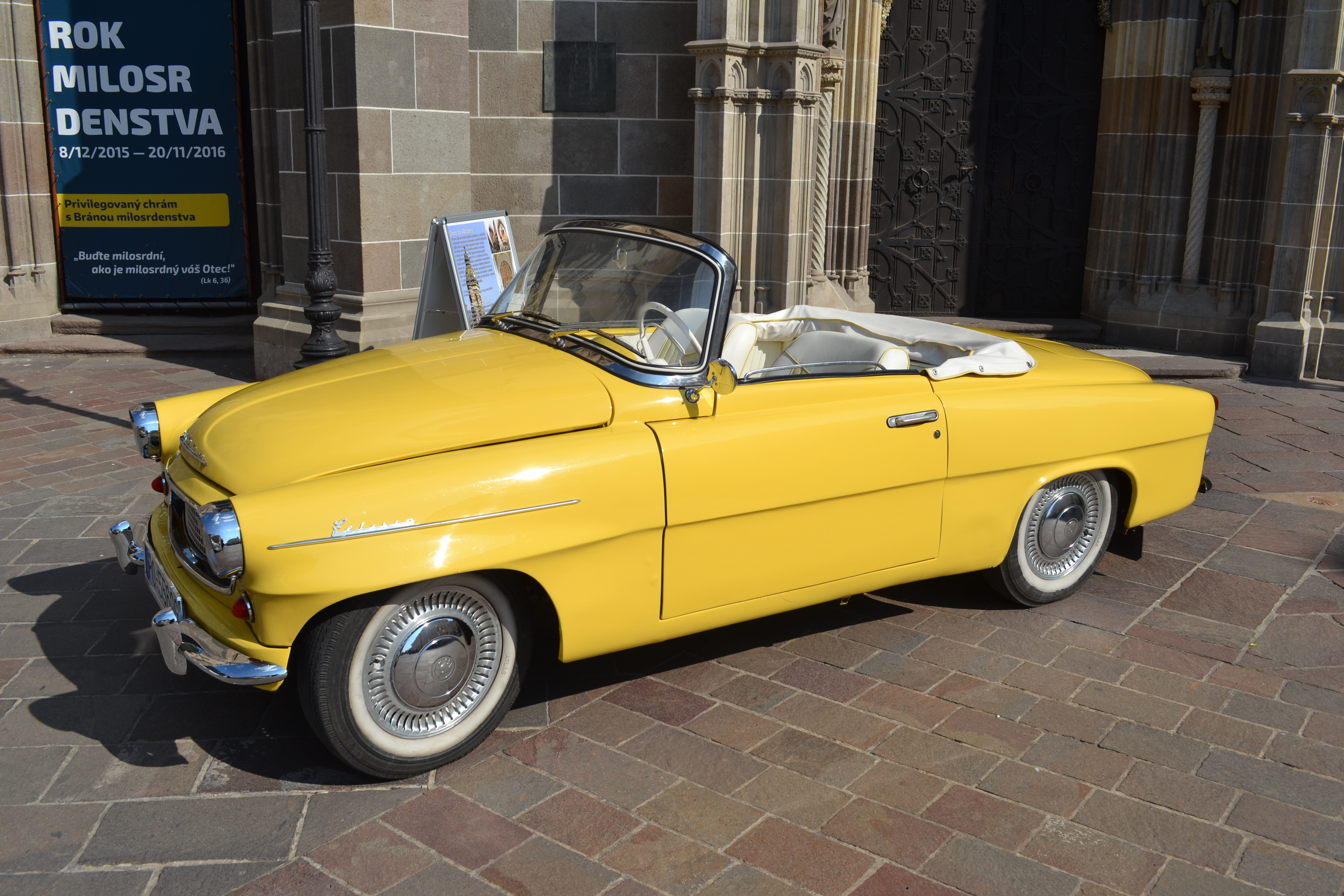
Škoda Felicia (1959–1964)

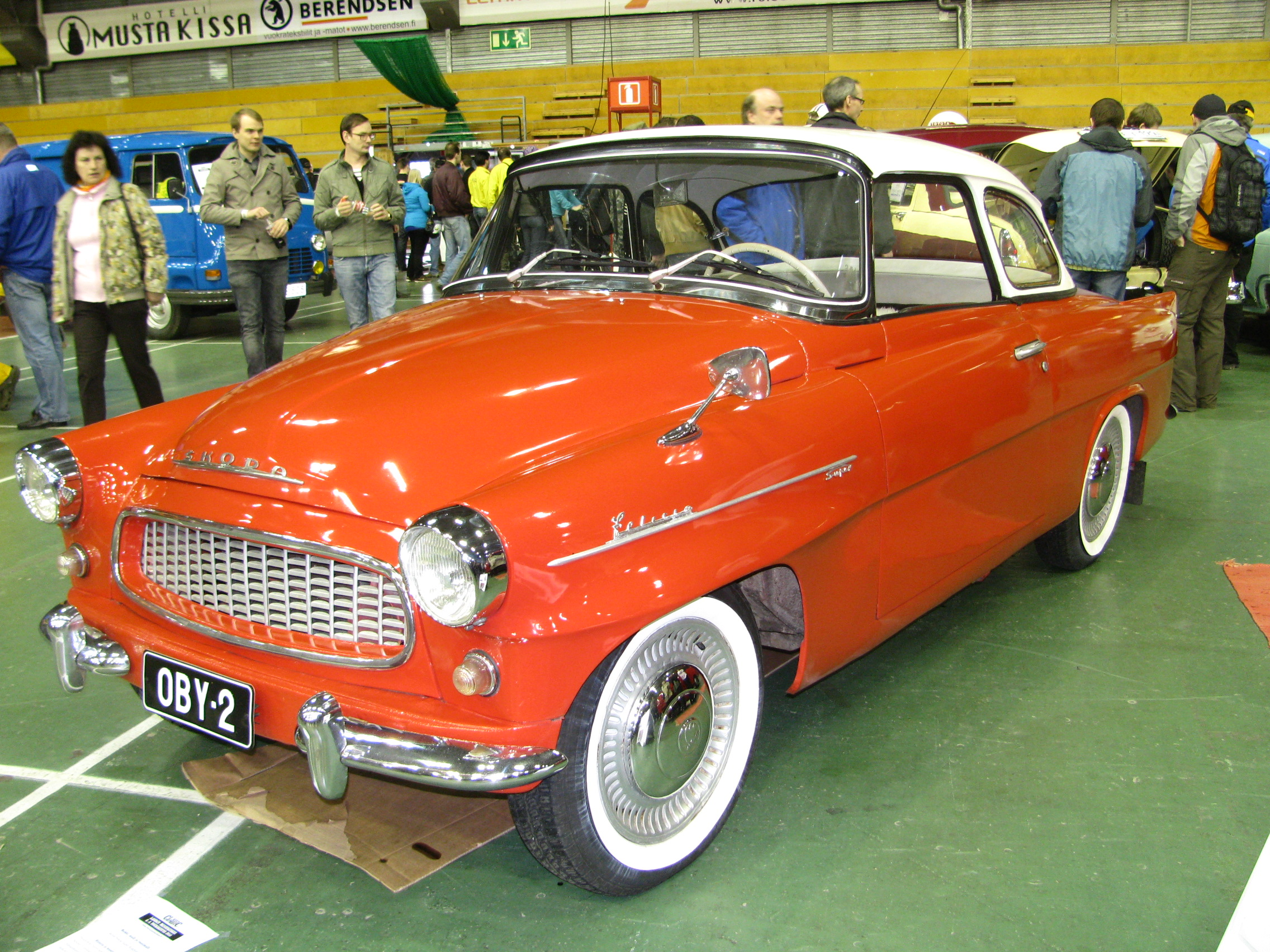
Škoda Felicia (1959–1964) with hardtop
