= Škoda Octavia (1959) =

Small family car produced by Czechoslovak automaker AZNP

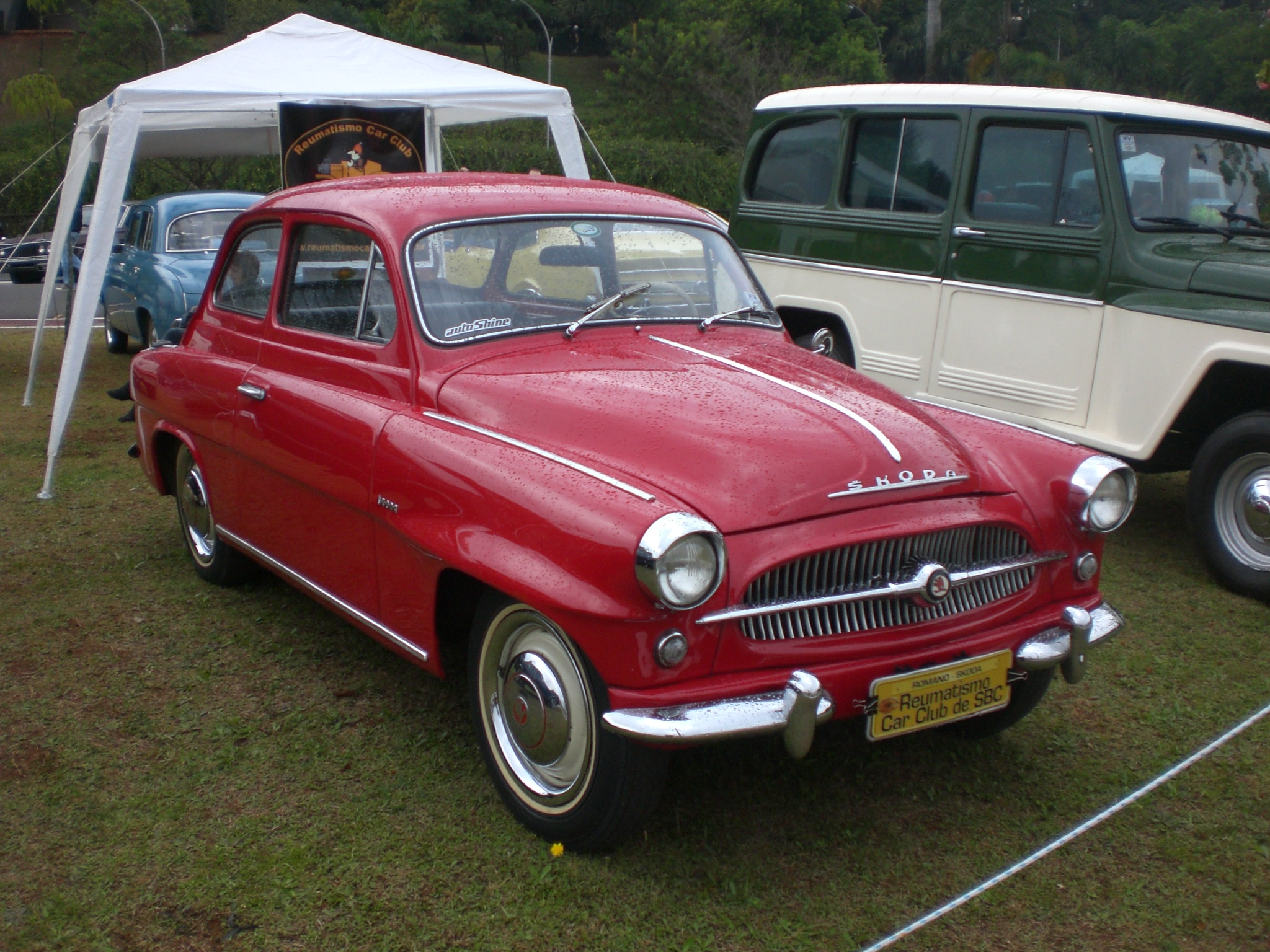

Overview
- Manufacturer: AZNP
- Production: 1959–1971
- Assembly: Czechoslovakia: Mladá Boleslav; Ireland: O'Shea, Cork; New Zealand: Auckland; Chile: Arica

Body and chassis
- Class: Small family car
- Body style: 2-door saloon 3-door estate
- Layout: FR layout
- Related: Škoda Felicia (1959–1964)

Powertrain
- Engine: 1089 cc I4; 1221 cc I4

Dimensions
- Wheelbase: 2,400 mm (94.5 in)
- Length: 4,065 mm (160.0 in)
- Width: 1,600 mm (63.0 in)
- Height: 1,430 mm (56.3 in)

Chronology
- Predecessor: Škoda 440/445
- Successor: Škoda 1000/1100 MB

The Škoda Octavia is a small family car which was produced by Czechoslovak automaker AZNP (now Škoda Auto) from 1959 to 1971, at their plant in Mladá Boleslav. It was introduced in January 1959 and was named Octavia as it was the eighth car produced by the nationalised Škoda company.

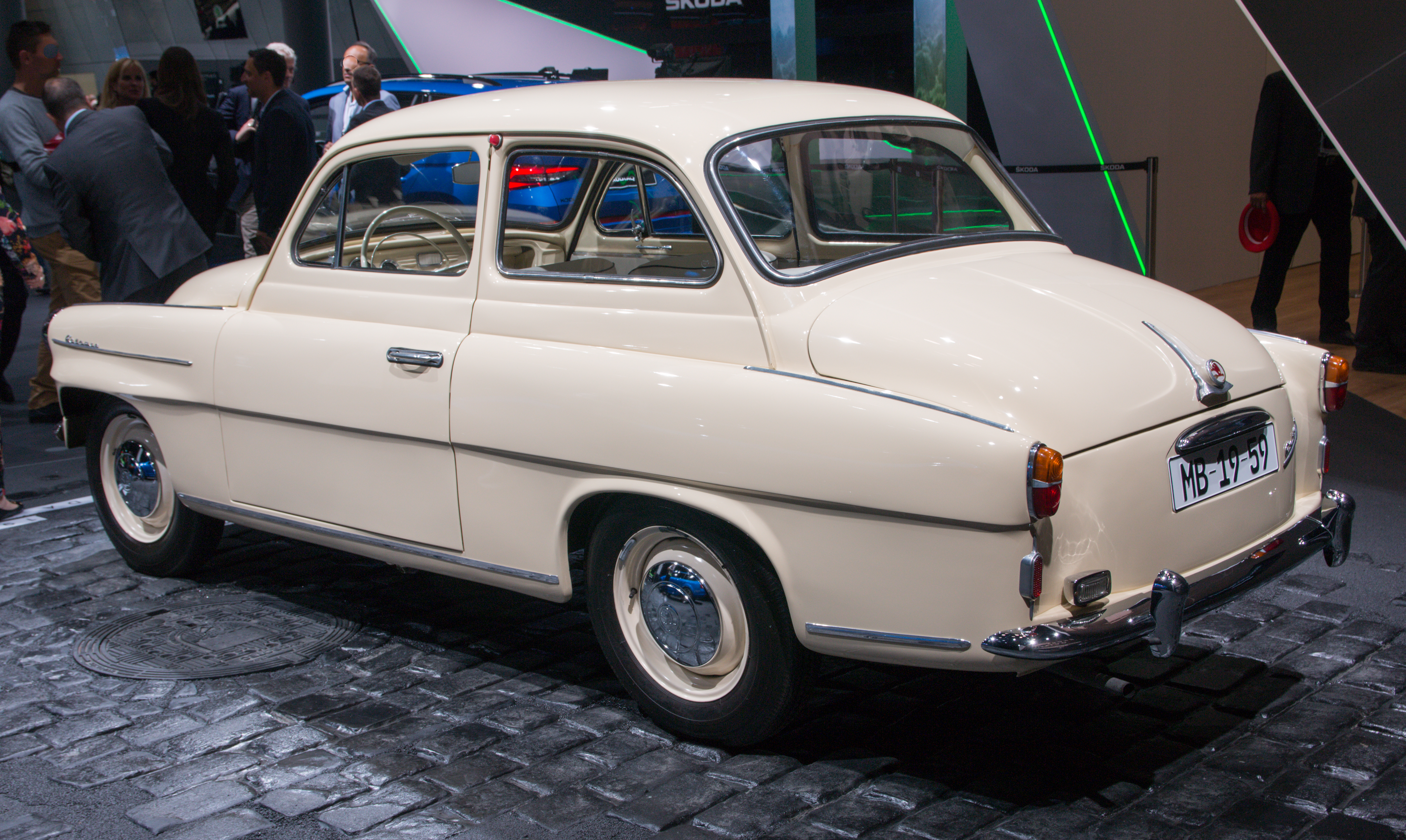
Škoda Octavia saloon rear view

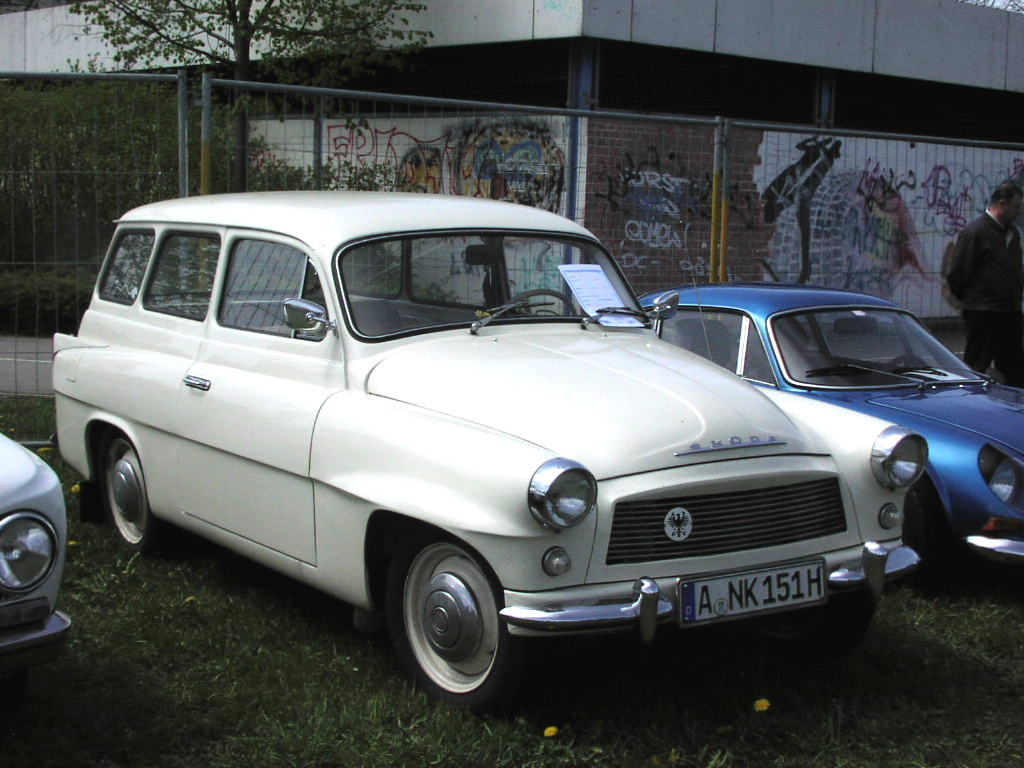
Škoda Octavia Combi

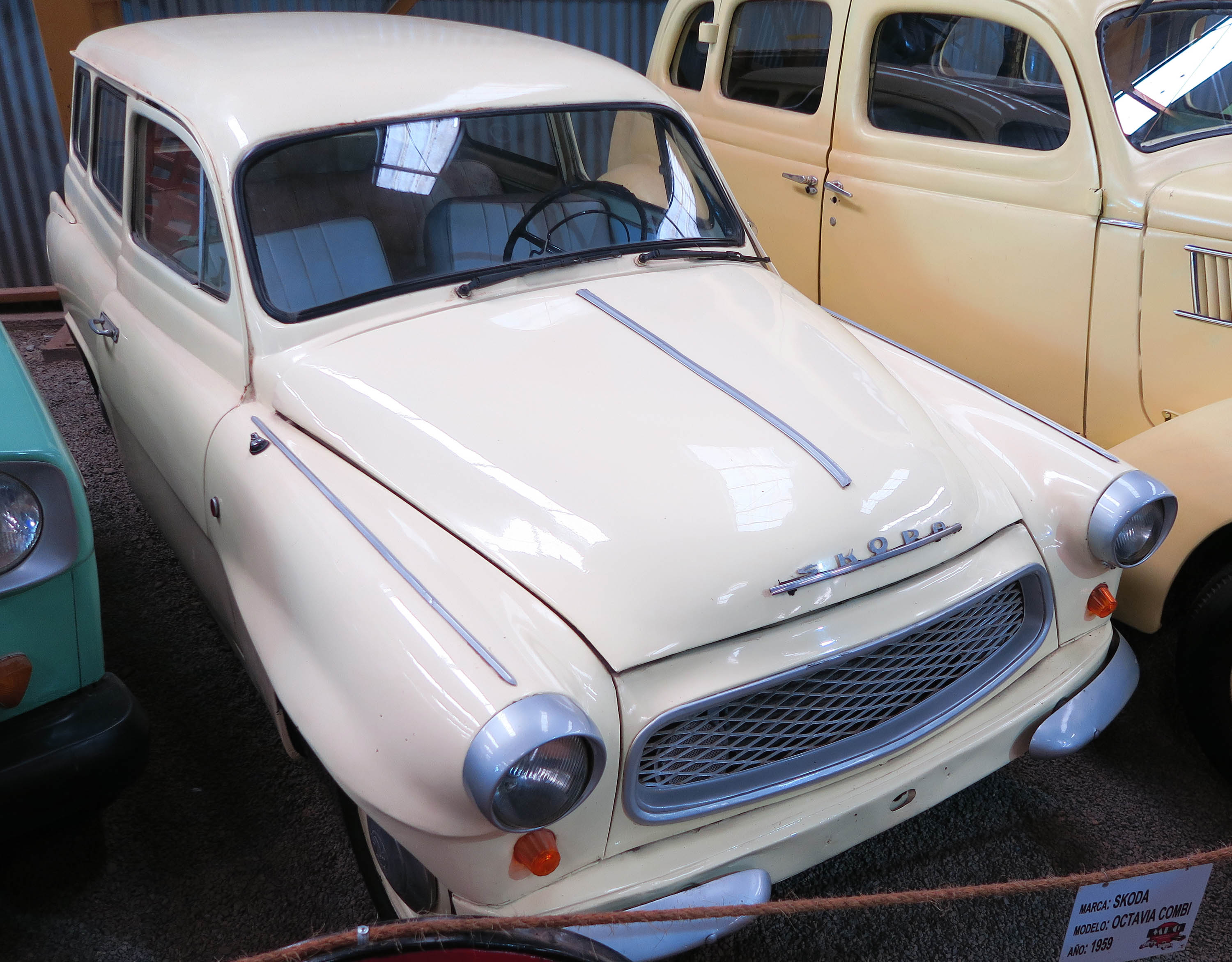
Chilean-made Octavia Kombi

The saloon was produced until 1964, when it was replaced by the Škoda 1000 MB. An estate version was introduced in 1961, and remained in production until 1971.

The Octavia was the successor to the Škoda 440/445 on which it was based. It featured redesigned front axles with a coil spring and telescopic shock absorbers rather than a leaf spring as in the 440.

The 1,270 kg (2,800 lb) saloons were sold with 1089 cc engines producing 40 PS (29 kW), later 50 PS (37 kW), and 1221 cc engines with 45–55 PS (33–40 kW). The slightly heavier estate wagons at 1,365 kg (3,009 lb) were all shipped with 1.2 litre engines. The top speed was 110 to 115 km/h (68 to 71 mph).

The Škoda Octavia engine and gearbox were used in the Trekka light utility vehicle, which was manufactured in New Zealand from 1966 to 1973, and also in the Skopak, which assembled and sold in Pakistan in the 1970s.

The Octavia name was resurrected in 1996 for a new model.

== Export ==
The Octavia and the similarly styled Felicia were sold in the United States in the early 1960s, despite the extreme Cold War tension between the United States and Czechoslovakia. However, Skoda failed to gain a large following in the import scene in the US, As many buyers were scared to buy a Communist-built car.

== In popular culture ==
The car is featured in the game My Summer Car as the abandoned and wasp-infested "RCO Ruscko", found at a ventti dealer's house.
