= Volkswagen Jetta (A7) =

Seventh generation of Volkswagen Jetta

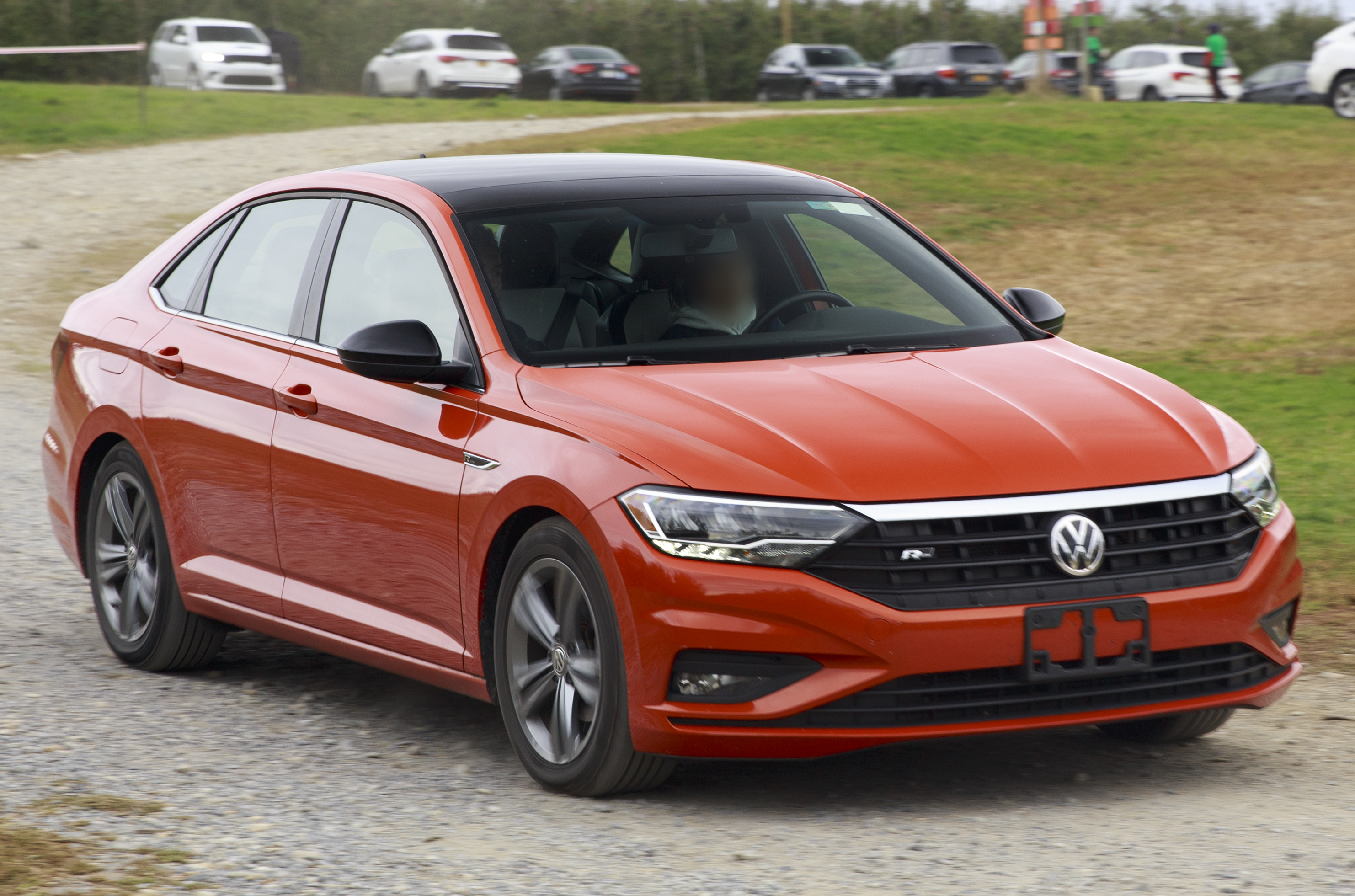

Overview
- Manufacturer: Volkswagen
- Also called: Volkswagen Vento (Argentina, Chile, Paraguay and Uruguay); Volkswagen Sagitar (China); Jetta VA7 (China, 2024–present)
- Production: 2018–present (Americas); 2019–present (China)
- Model years: 2019–present
- Assembly: Mexico: Puebla (Volkswagen de México); China: Chengdu (FAW-VW)
- Designer: Klaus Bischoff and Jan Schmid

Body and chassis
- Class: Compact car (C-segment)
- Body style: 4-door sedan
- Layout: Front-engine, front-wheel-drive
- Platform: Volkswagen Group MQB A1
- Related: Volkswagen Golf; Volkswagen Lamando; Volkswagen Bora; Volkswagen Taos/Tharu; Škoda Octavia

Powertrain
- Engine: Gasoline: 1.2 L TSI I4 (Sagitar); 1.4 L TSI I4; 1.5 L TSI I4; 1.6 L MSI I4; 2.0 L TSI I4
- Transmission: 5-speed manual; 6-speed manual; 6-speed AQ250 Aisin TF-60SN Tiptronic automatic; 6-speed DQ250 DSG Tiptronic; 7-speed DQ380 DSG; 8-speed Aisin AWF8F35 automatic

Dimensions
- Wheelbase: 2,686 mm (105.7 in); LWB: 2,731 mm (107.5 in)
- Length: 4,702 mm (185.1 in); LWB: 4,753 mm (187.1 in)
- Width: 1,799 mm (70.8 in)
- Height: 1,459 mm (57.4 in)
- Curb weight: 1,310–1,347 kg (2,888–2,970 lb)

Chronology
- Predecessor: Volkswagen Jetta (A6)
- Successor: Volkswagen Sagitar L (China)

The Volkswagen Jetta (A7) is a compact car, the seventh generation of the Volkswagen Jetta and the successor to the Volkswagen Jetta (A6). The 2018 Jetta debuted at the 2018 North American International Auto Show in Detroit, Michigan, on 14 January 2018, after Volkswagen released an exterior design sketch in December 2017. The Jetta is based on Volkswagen's MQB platform, which underpins other Volkswagen vehicles including the Volkswagen Golf and the Volkswagen Atlas. The A7 Jetta marked the discontinuation of the nameplate in the European market and right-hand-drive markets.

== Overview ==
=== North America ===
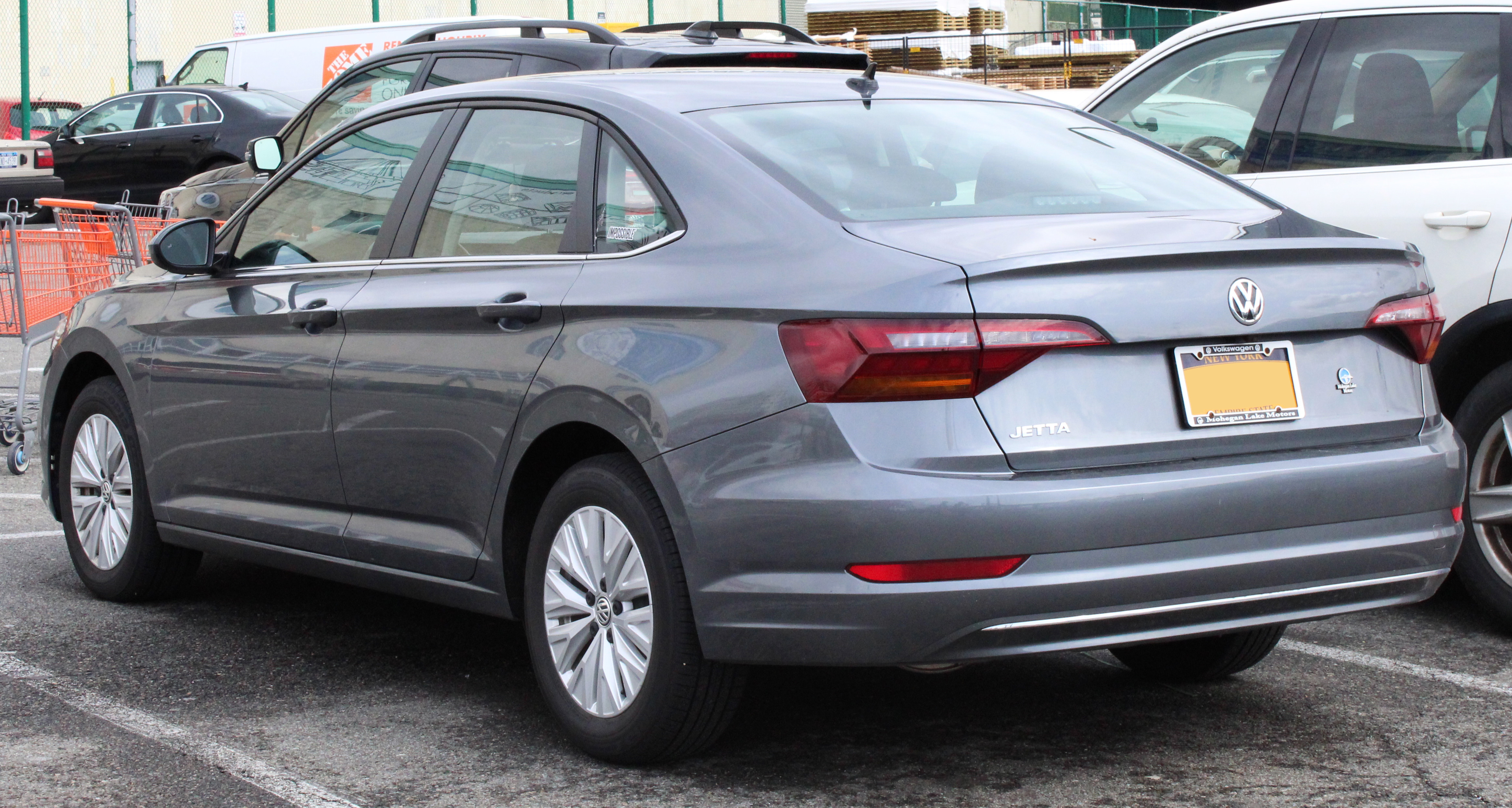
Volkswagen Jetta A7 (United States)

The seventh-generation Jetta is larger than its predecessor, offers more interior room and has the latest generation of Volkswagen's infotainment systems, including integration of Apple CarPlay and Android Auto. Its ten-color customizable ambient interior lighting includes lighting across the dashboard and instrument panel, front and rear doors, foot wells, and the gauge "rings" of a newly available fully digital instrument cluster display, marketed as the "Digital Cockpit". Reflector LED headlamps and LED rear tail lamps are standard equipment, and a panoramic sunroof is also available. Heated and ventilated front seats are available as well, as leather-trimmed seating surfaces become available for the first time since the Mk5 Jetta. In addition, Volkswagen is the second automaker in the U.S. to offer a premium Beats Audio audio system.

The Jetta's 1.8 L turbocharged TSI inline four-cylinder gasoline engine has been discontinued, as the outgoing 147 hp (110 kW) 1.4 L turbocharged TSI inline four-cylinder is the only engine option on the Jetta. A six-speed manual is available on the S and R-Line trim levels with an optional eight-speed automatic, all other trims only offer an eight-speed automatic transmission. On higher trim levels, the Jetta also offers seventeen-inch aluminum-alloy wheels, and Volkswagen Driving Mode Selection. There is also Cross Differential System (XDS), but it is only available on the Jetta R-Line.

Safety features on the Jetta include an Intelligent Crash Response System (ICRS), and a standard safety cage. An automatic post-collision braking system, a tire pressure monitoring system (TPMS), as well as seven safety and stability-enhancing systems all come as standard equipment.

Trim levels of the all-new Jetta in the U.S. are S, SE, R-Line, SEL, and SEL Premium. Trim levels in Canada are Comfortline, Highline (available with optional R-Line package) and Execline, while Mexican trim levels are Trendline, Comfortline, R-Line, and Highline. All trim levels lost the multi-link rear independent suspension for a less expensive torsion-beam rear suspension.

As with its predecessors, production of the all-new 2019 Jetta will continue at Volkswagen's Puebla assembly plant in Mexico. The all-new Jetta reached Volkswagen dealerships in the U.S. in the second quarter of 2018. This new seventh generation Jetta will not be sold in the European market.

In September 2020, the Mexican model introduced a budget trim level for the Jetta named Startline, which slots below the Trendline trim and is equipped with the 1.6-liter MSI engine used by the Virtus sedan, significantly reducing its price, only offered in the Tiptronic 6-speed automatic transmission option, and few units will be sold. It retains the same features from Trendline.

== Facelift ==
=== 2021 refresh ===
The first facelift for the Jetta was revealed in Chicago in August 2021 for the 2022 model year. Bearing an updated look and design, the new C-segment sedan also gains added kit and a new engine. The 1.5 liter turbo four-cylinder replaces the long-serving 1.4 TSI. The facelifted model simultaneously arrived to the Mexican market a day later.

All trim levels receive a higher level of standard equipment, and a new Sport trim replaces the previous R Line model, while the SEL Premium trim is discontinued, leaving the SEL as the top trim level of the standard Jetta lineup. The GLI lineup is simplified into a single "base" model, and includes all of the standard equipment from the previous top-tier Autobahn trim, along with a lower price. For the standard Jetta lineup, the base S model retains its six-speed manual transmission, which is also available on the new Sport trim. The GLI also retains its standard six-speed manual transmission.

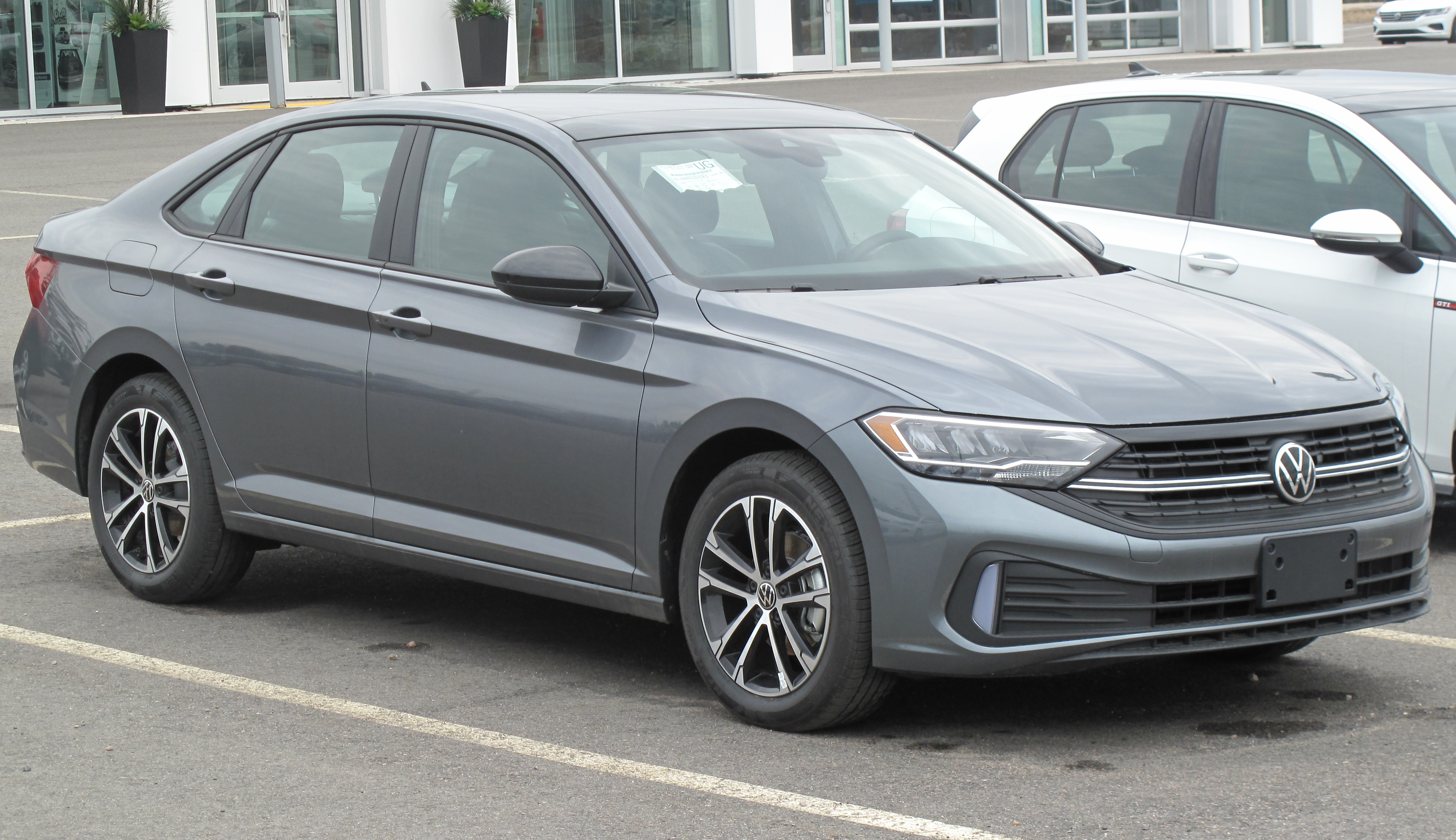
2022 Volkswagen Jetta Comfortline Sport

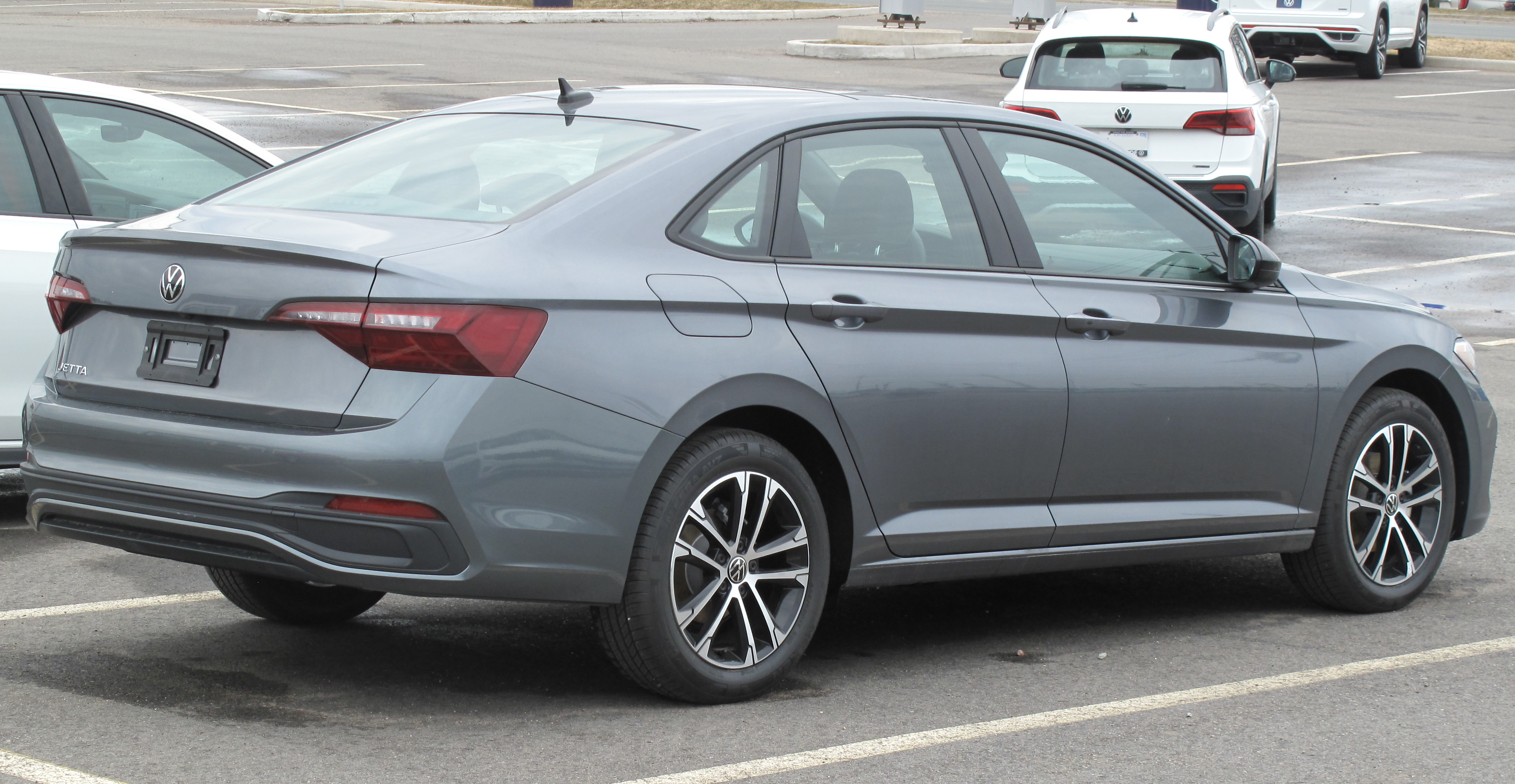
Rear view

=== 2024 refresh ===
The second facelift for the Jetta was revealed on 25 June 2024 for the 2025 model year. Changes include an updated front fascia design with a new grille and new headlights, there is the option of a full-width light bar on the grille for the Sport trim and above, the rear receives a new full-width light bar, new exterior colors, and new alloy wheel designs. Inside, the interior features a "new three-line" dashboard design, an 8-inch touchscreen head unit is standard on all models, the inclusion of touch capacitive controls for the HVAC system replaced the conventional dials, and new interior colors. Other changes are the inclusion of the Volkswagen's IQ.Drive safety suite standard on all models and the manual transmission option is no longer available on the regular Jetta (except on the GLI model).

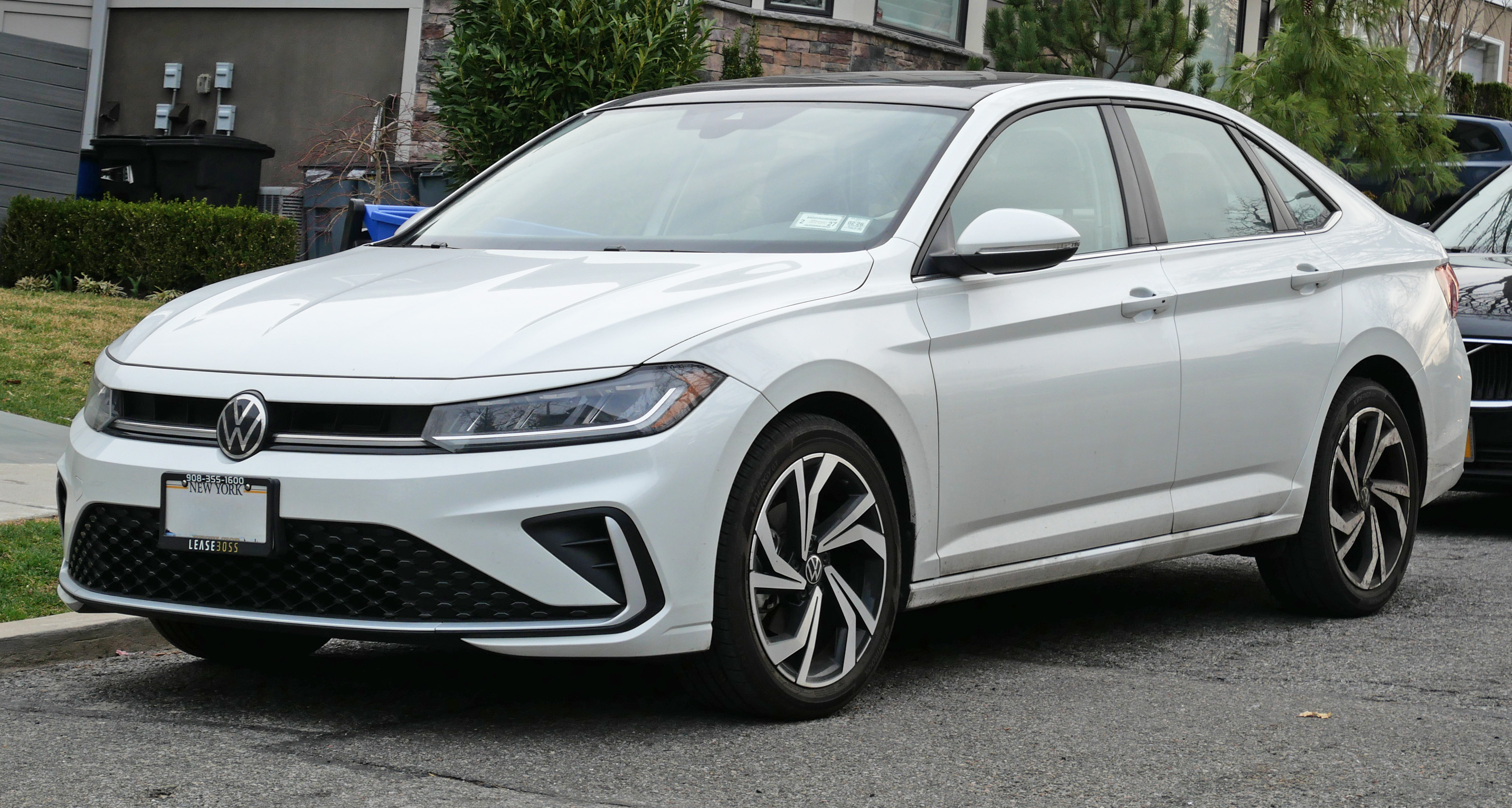
2025 Jetta SEL, front view (facelift)

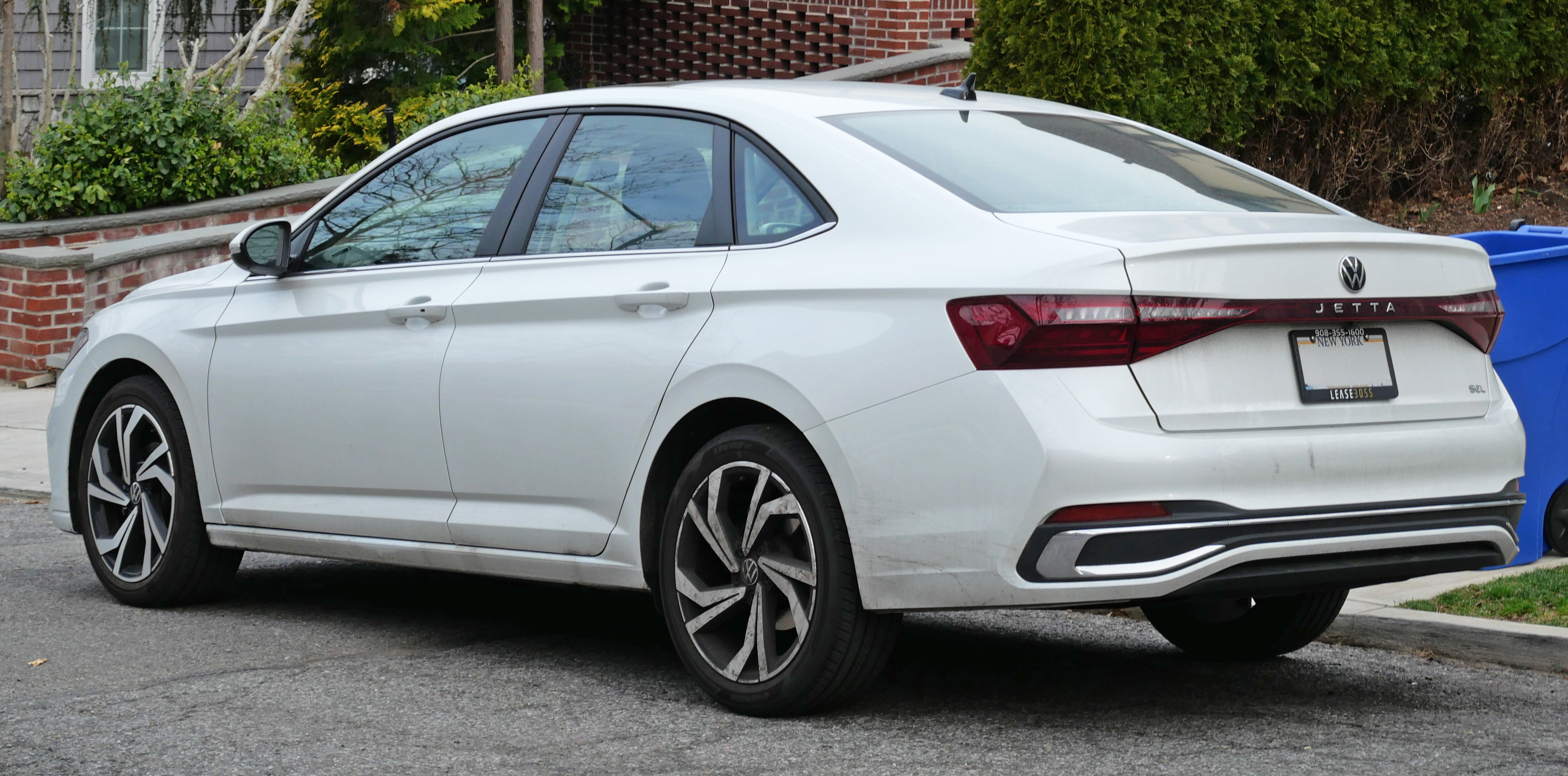
Rear view (facelift)

== Powertrain ==
Model	Displacement	Series	Power	Torque	Transmission	Note
Petrol engines
1.4 TSI	1,395 cc I4	EA211	147 hp (149 PS; 110 kW)	250 N⋅m (184 lb⋅ft)	6-speed manual, 6-speed automatic (South America) or 8-speed automatic	
1.5 TSI	1,498 cc I4	EA211 Evo	158 hp (160 PS; 118 kW)	250 N⋅m (184 lb⋅ft)	6-speed manual, 8-speed automatic	
1.6 MSI	1,598 cc I4		112 PS (82 kW; 110 hp)	155 N⋅m (114 lb⋅ft)	5-speed manual, 6-speed automatic	Only available in Mexico (limited production entry/fleet model) and Russia
2.0 TSI (GLI)	1,984 cc I4	EA888	228 hp (231 PS; 170 kW)	350 N⋅m (258 lb⋅ft)	6-speed manual, 6-speed DSG (South America) or 7-speed DSG	

== Jetta GLI ==
The Jetta GLI was revealed at the Chicago Auto Show on 7 February 2019. The GLI features a 228 hp (170 kW) EA888 gasoline engine, the same engine from the 2019 Volkswagen Golf GTI. A 6-speed manual transmission is standard, although a 7-speed dual-clutch automatic transmission is available at an additional cost. In addition to the drivetrain upgrades, a multi-link rear suspension and a VAQ electronically controlled limited-slip differential are included. The GLI features a few exterior upgrades from the standard Jetta, including larger 18-inch alloy wheels, a small rear spoiler, different bumpers, and a black grille with a red stripe. Projector LED headlights with LED daytime running lights (DRL) are standard. A 35th-anniversary edition was available as a trim level in 2019. It features a few exterior upgrades. The trim also includes Volkswagen's DCC active suspension which is absent on other trim levels.

Along with the standard Jetta, the GLI received a facelift for 2022 with a revised front and rear bumper. In the United States, the base "S" model was discontinued. The powertrain remains unchanged with the EA888 2.0 liter four-cylinder turbo from the Golf GTI with either a 6-speed manual or 7-speed DSG.

Volkswagen celebrated the 40th anniversary of the Jetta GLI with a special edition called the Jetta GLI 40th Anniversary Edition, offered exclusively in North America.

The 6-speed manual transmission was discontinued in North America for the 2027 model year, it was the last manual-transmission equipped Volkswagen to be sold in North America.

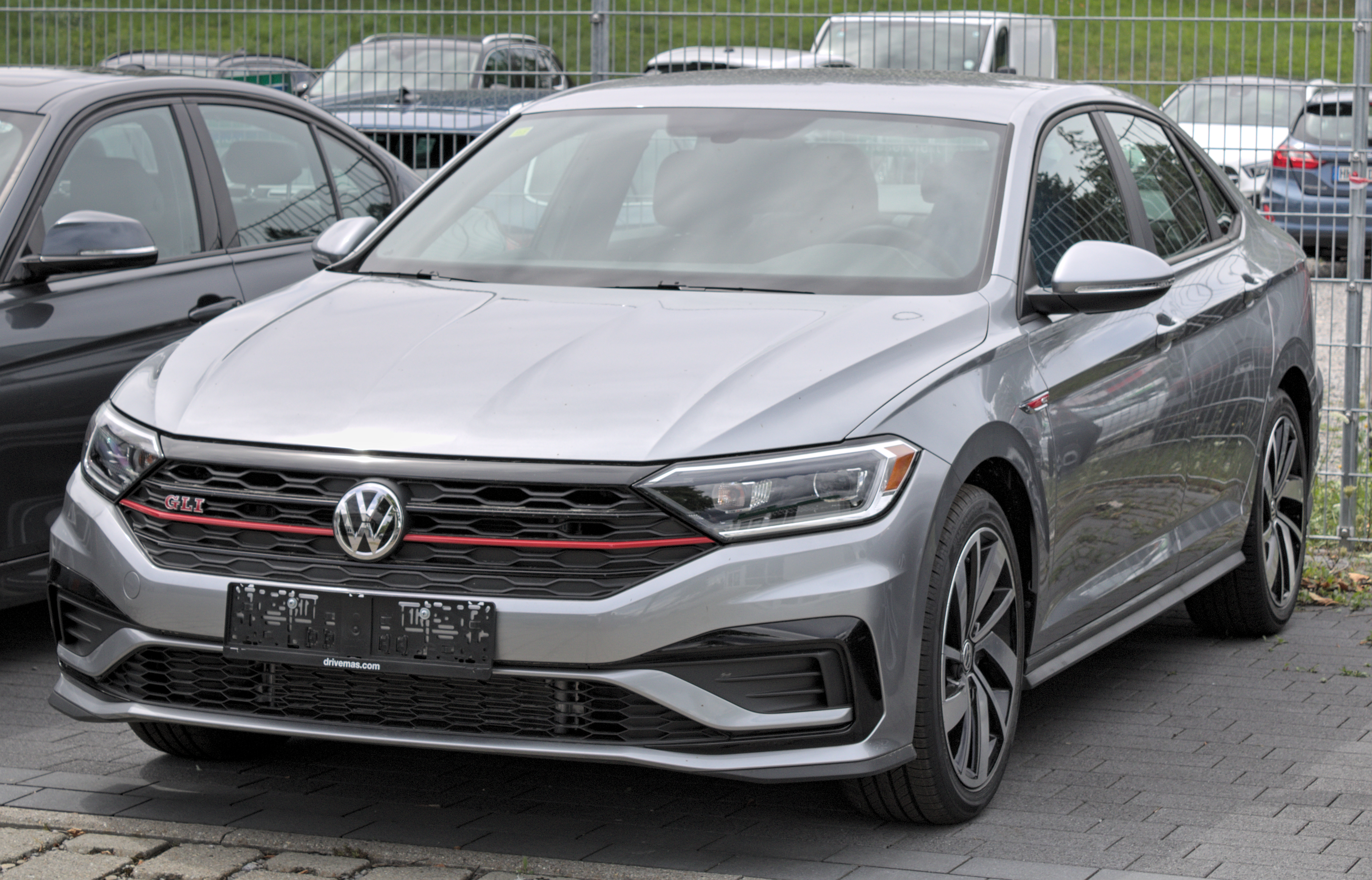
Volkswagen Jetta GLI in Germany, which was obtained through parallel import

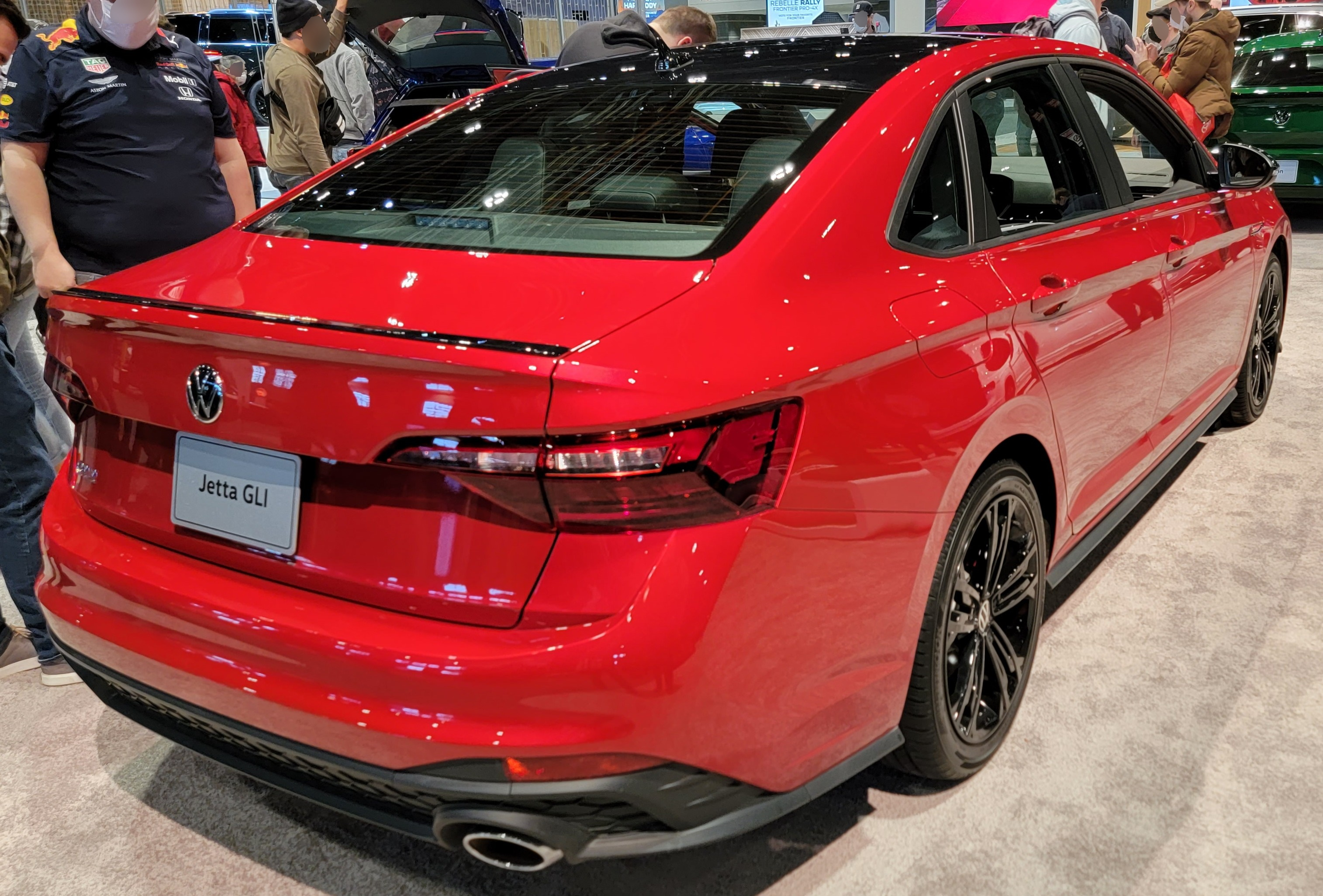
2022 Jetta GLI rear (facelifted, US)

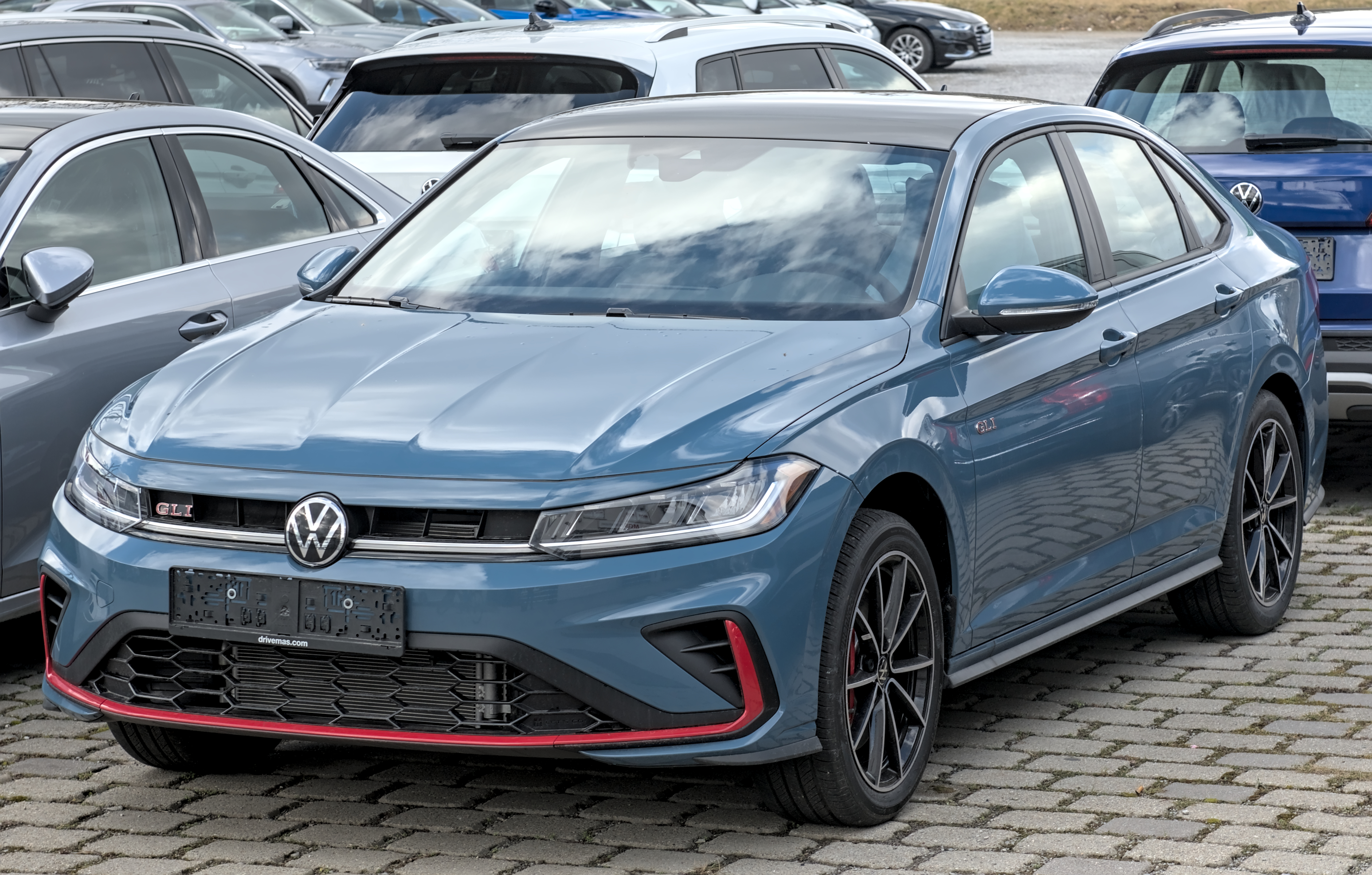
2025 Jetta GLI

== Volkswagen Sagitar (China) ==
The Chinese-spec Volkswagen Sagitar long wheelbase was launched on 19 January 2019 both in Beijing and Shanghai. it is about 55 mm (2.2 in) longer than the US-spec model, and is equipped with independent suspension. This is an attempt to occupy the more upscale market than the Volkswagen Lamando built by SAIC-VW, which share the similar look. Production continues in the FAW-VW Chengdu Plant.

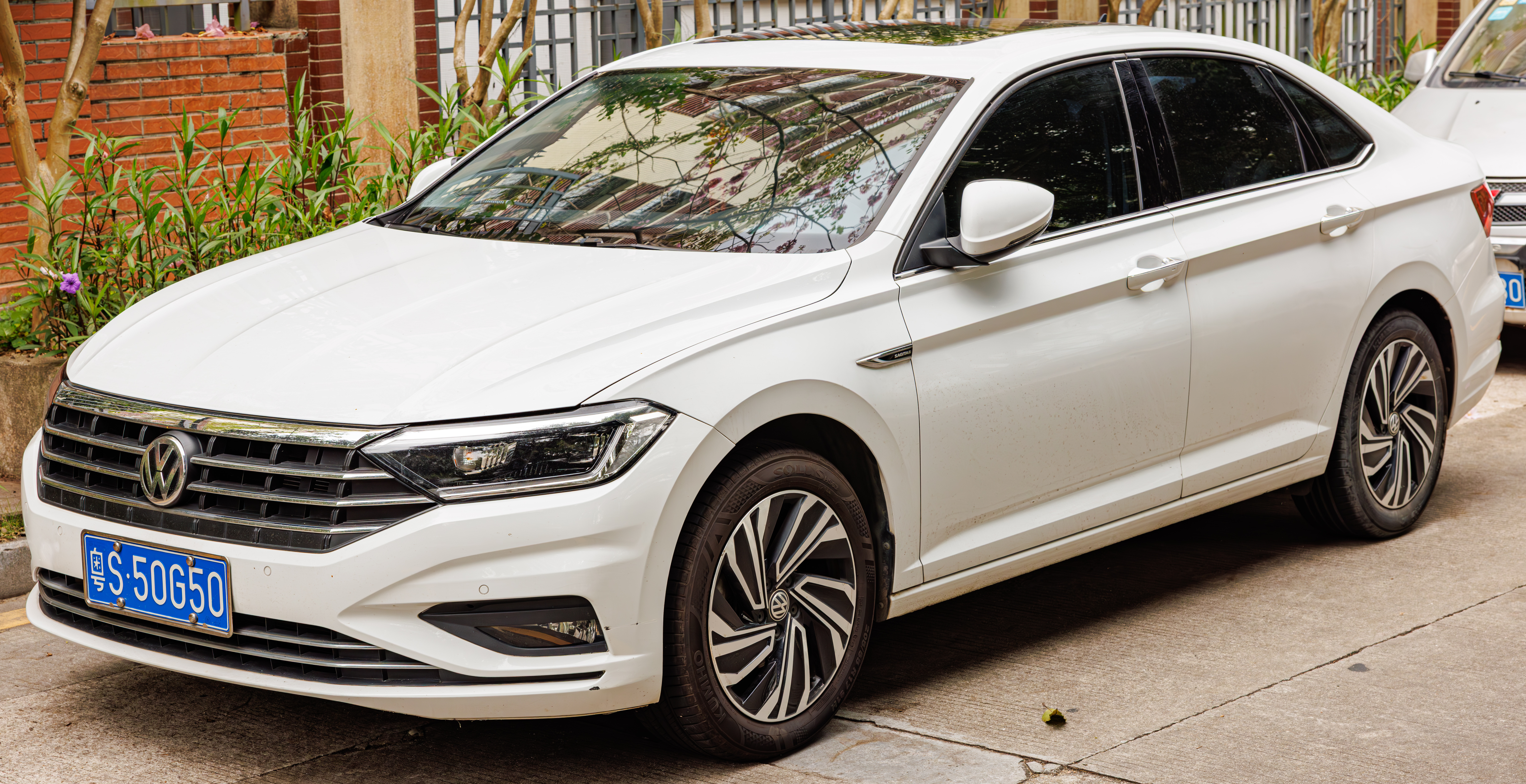
Volkswagen Sagitar

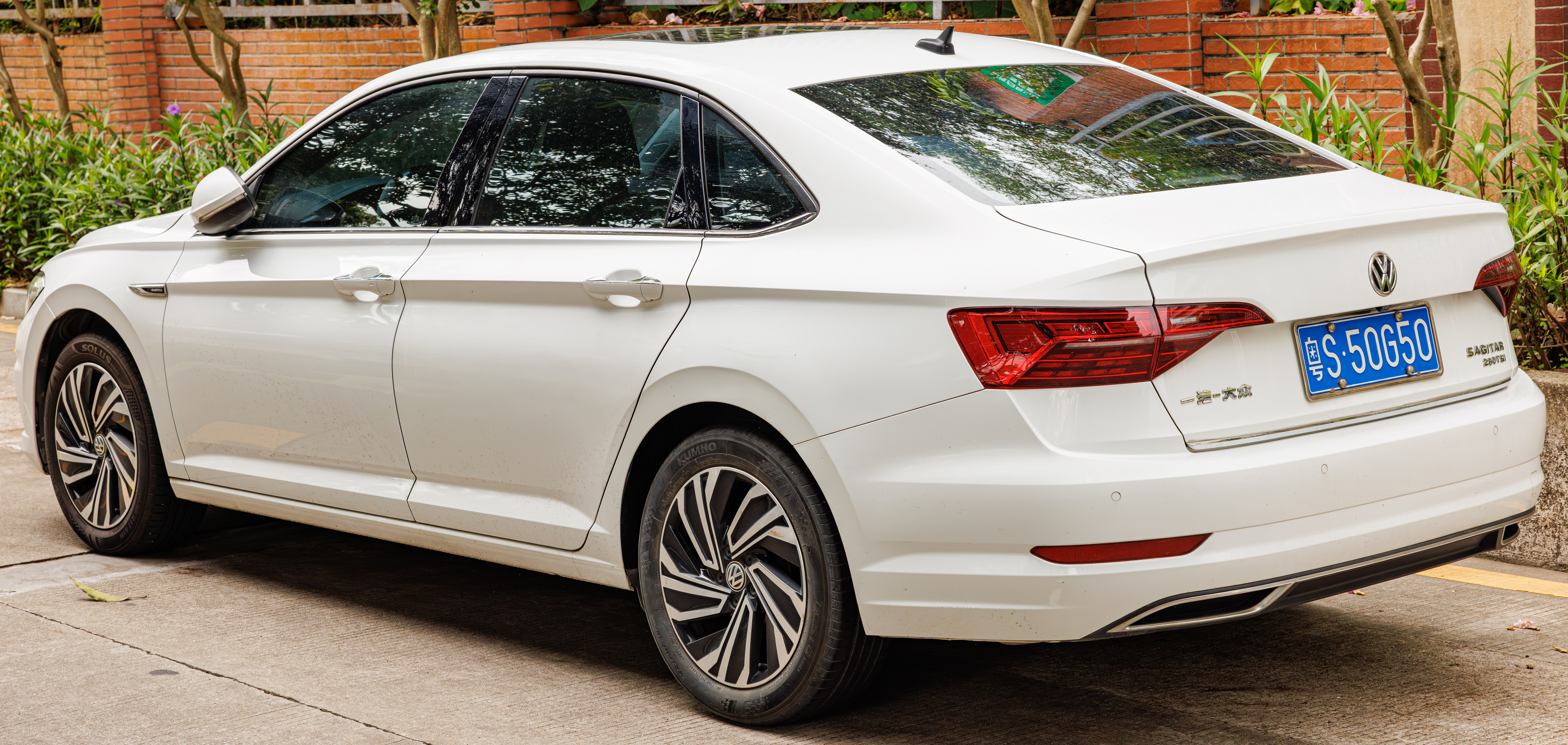
Rear view

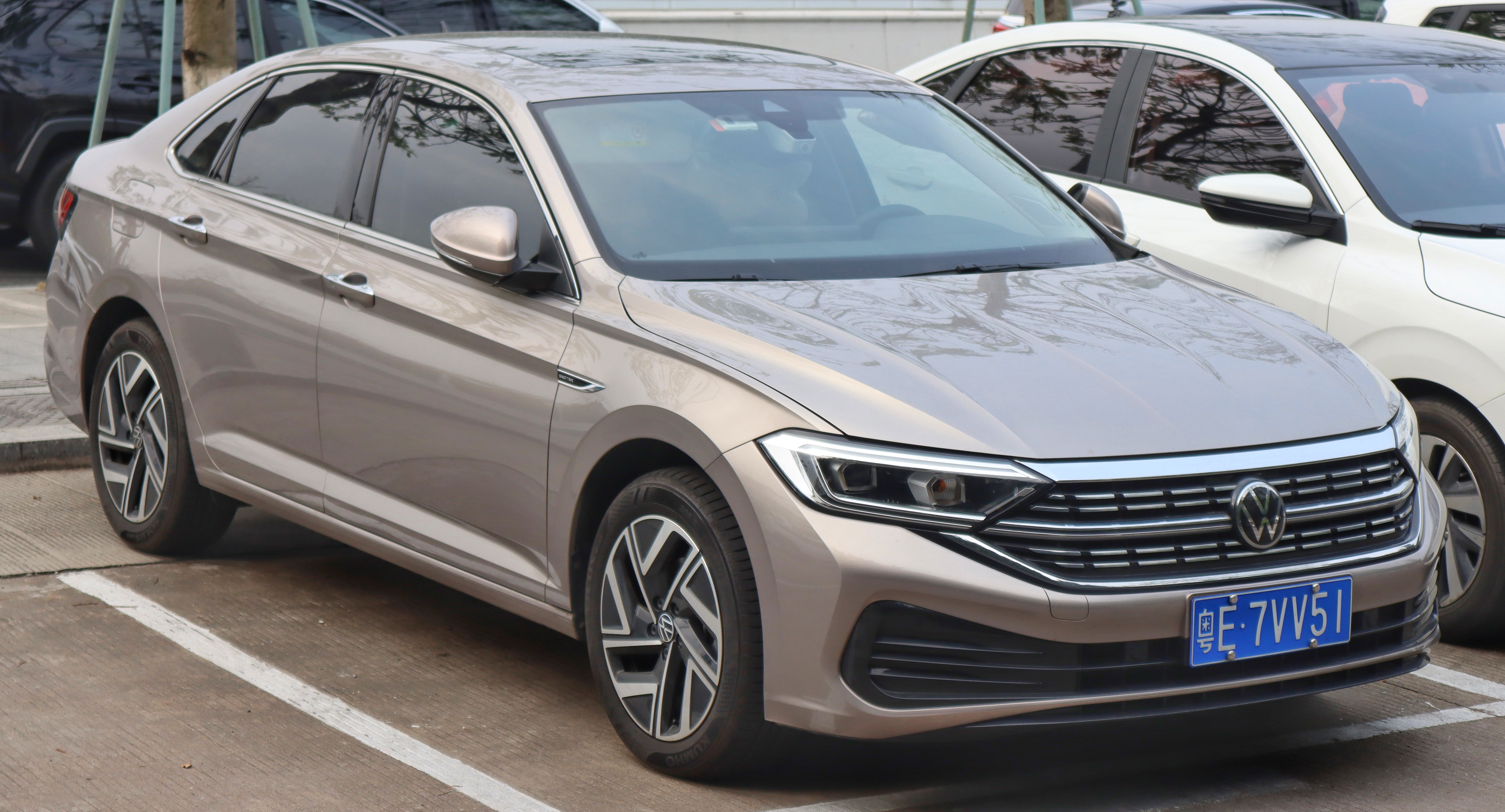
Volkswagen Sagitar (2022, facelift)

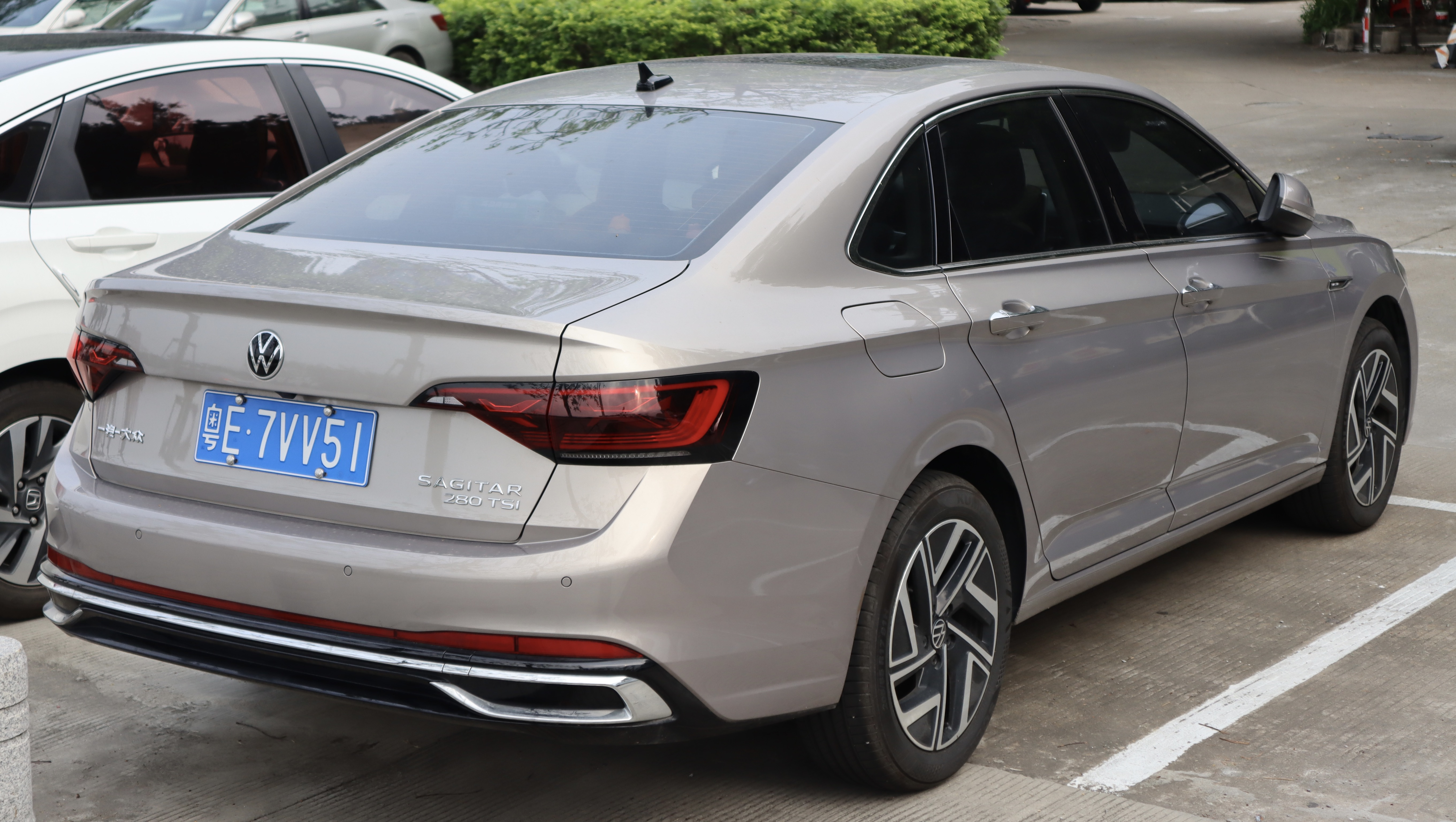
Rear view

=== Jetta VA7 ===
In November 2024, FAW-VW launched Jetta VA7, a rebadged A7 under Jetta marque.

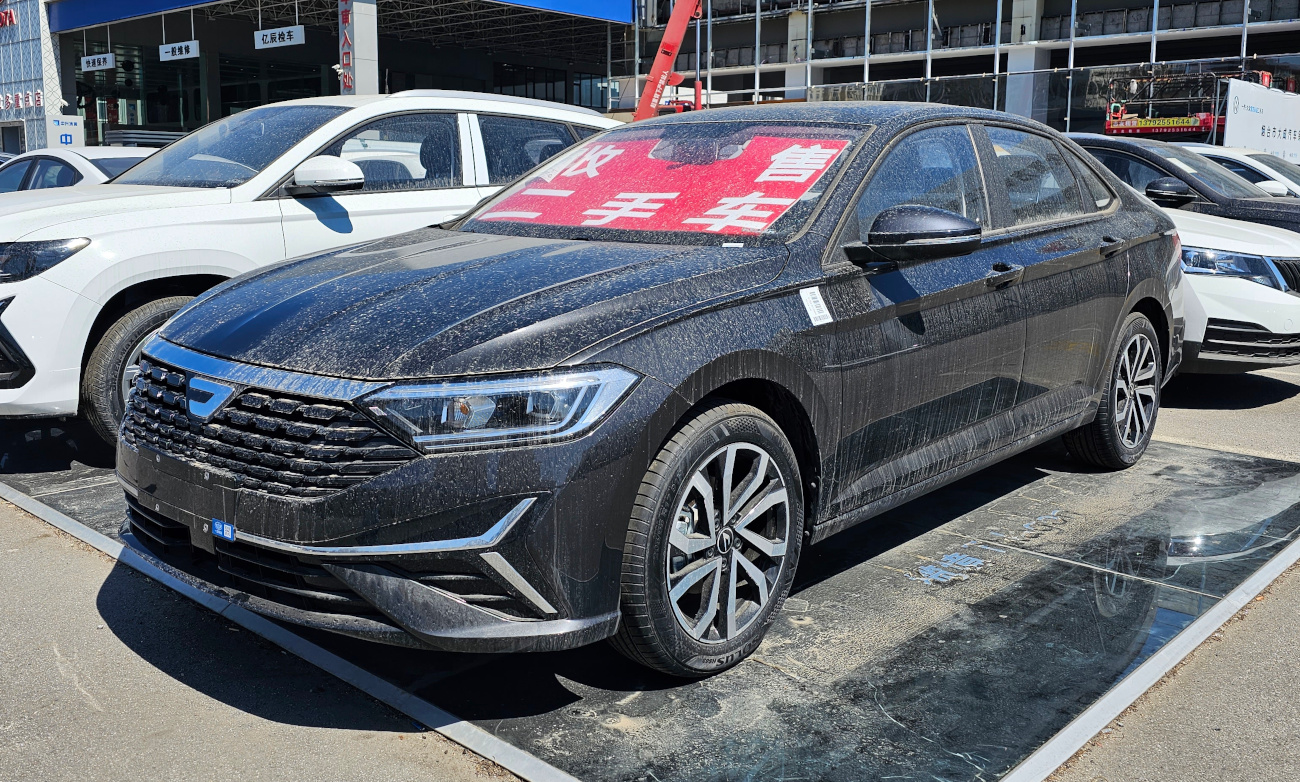
Jetta VA7

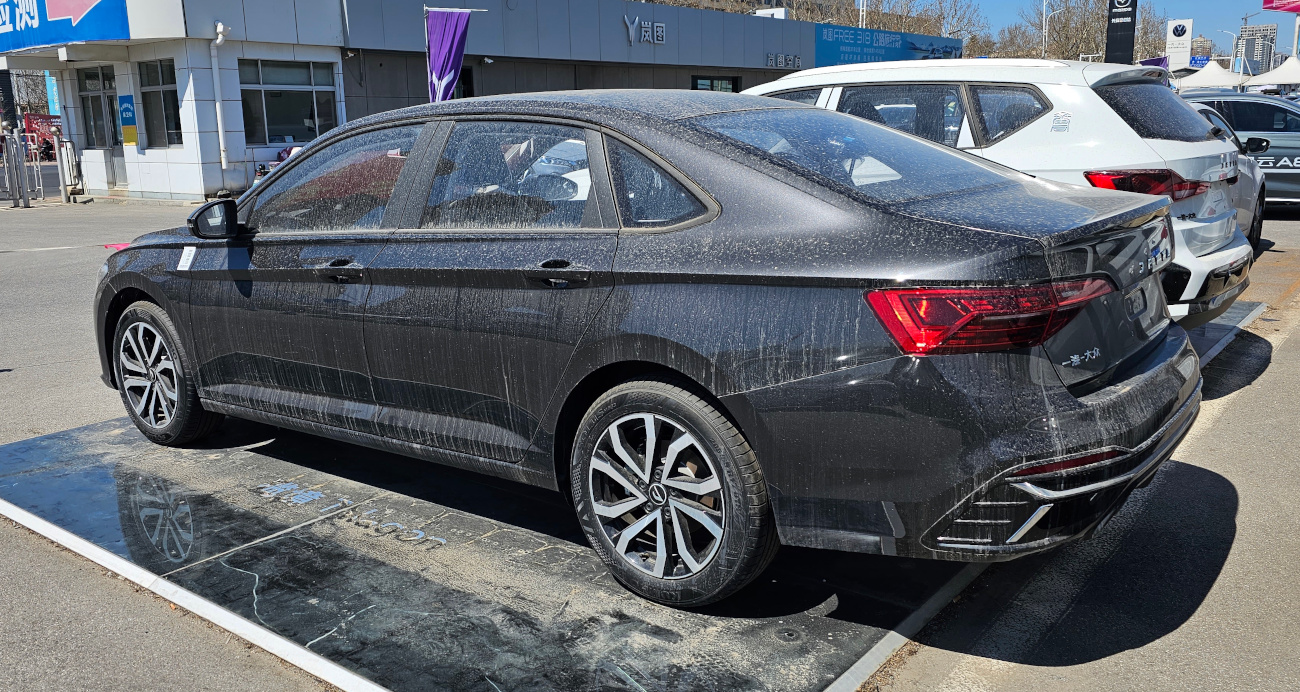
Rear view

=== Powertrain ===
Model	Displacement	Series	Power	Torque	Transmission
Petrol engines
1.2 '200 TSI'^{†}	1,197 cc I4	EA211 (DLS/DJN)	115 PS (85 kW; 113 hp)	175 N⋅m (129 lb⋅ft)	5-speed manual
1.2 '200 TSI'^{†}	1,197 cc I4	EA211 (DLS/DJN)	115 PS (85 kW; 113 hp)	200 N⋅m (148 lb⋅ft)	7-speed DSG
1.4 '280 TSI'^{†}	1,395 cc I4	EA211 (DJS/CSS)	150 PS (110 kW; 148 hp)	250 N⋅m (184 lb⋅ft)	7-speed DSG
1.5 '300 TSI'^{†}	1,498 cc I4	EA211 (DSV)	160 PS (118 kW; 158 hp)	250 N⋅m (184 lb⋅ft)	7-speed DSG

^{† Marketed and labeled as such in China}

== Safety ==
=== Latin NCAP ===
The Mexican-built Jetta in its most basic Latin American market configuration with 6 airbags and ESC was qualified 5 stars by Latin NCAP 2.0 in 2019 in both infant and adult passengers, and is awarded two Latin NCAP Advanced Awards, one for pedestrian safety and other for AEB (Autonomous Emergency Braking).

Latin NCAP 2.0 test results Volkswagen Jetta / Vento* + 6 Airbags (* for Uruguay and Argentina) (2019, based on Euro NCAP 2008)
Test	Points	Stars
Adult occupant:	30.16/34.0	5 /5 stars
Child occupant:	44.98/49.00	5 /5 stars

=== IIHS ===
The 2022 Jetta was tested by the IIHS:

IIHS scores
Small overlap front (Driver)	Good	
Small overlap front (Passenger)	Good	
Moderate overlap front	Good	
Side (original test)	Good	
Side (updated test)	Acceptable	
Roof strength	Good	
Head restraints and seats	Good	
Headlights	Marginal / Poor	varies by trim/option
Seat belt reminders	Poor	
Child seat anchors (LATCH) ease of use	Acceptable	

== Sales ==
Year	China
Year	Jetta VA7
2024	15
2025	5,003
