= Jetta (car brand) =

Chinese car brand

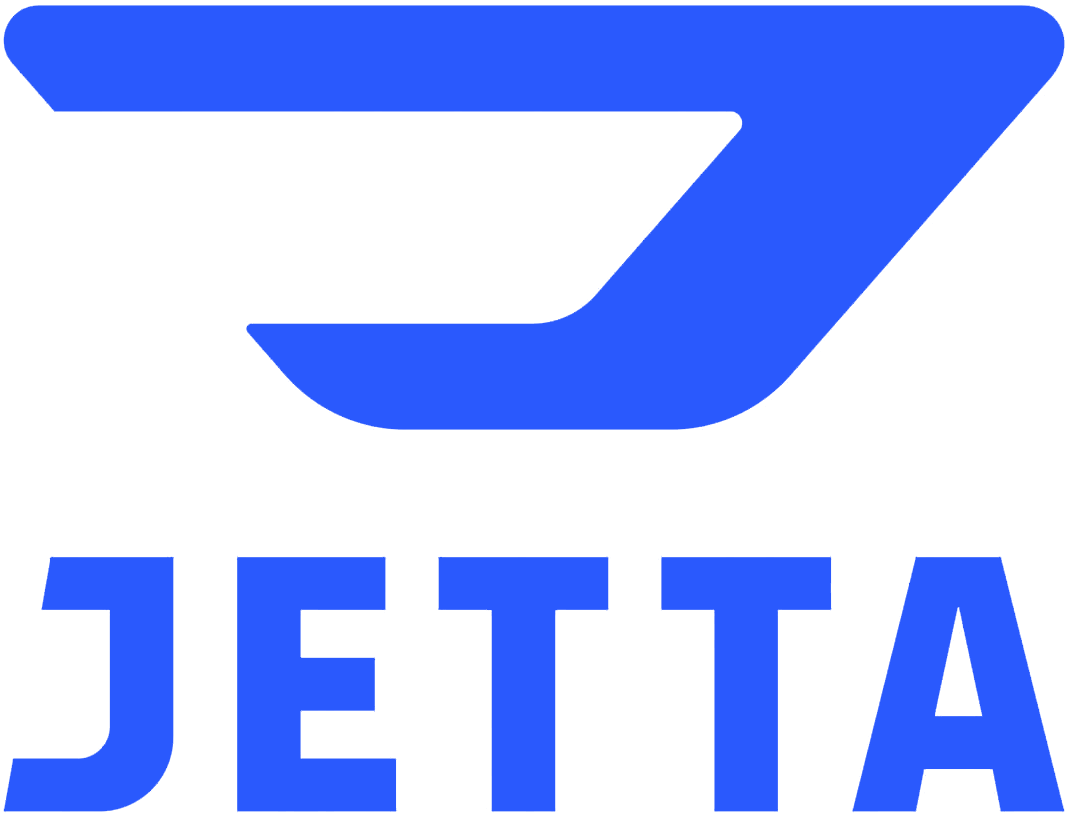
- Product type: Automobiles
- Current owner: Volkswagen Group
- Produced by: FAW-Volkswagen
- Country: China; Germany
- Introduced: 2019; 7 years ago
- Markets: China; Iran; Kazakhstan; Russia; Uzbekistan
- Ambassador: Harald Müller (President)
- Website: jetta.faw-vw.com

Jetta
- Traditional Chinese: 捷達
- Simplified Chinese: 捷达
Transcriptions
Standard Mandarin
- Hanyu Pinyin: Jiédá

Jetta is a car brand created by the Volkswagen Group with its joint venture partner FAW Group in 2019. The Volkswagen Jetta is a popular car in China, and the model forms the basis of the new company, with two additional SUV models joining the range.

The Jetta cars are built in Chengdu at an FAW-Volkswagen joint venture plant.

== History ==
At the time, when the Jetta brand was introduced, Harald Müller was the company president.

In May 2020, Harald Müller revealed in interviews that there's been interest in the brand from outside China. In August 2020, there are plans to potentially export Jetta-branded vehicles outside China, but the company has not disclosed which target markets they want to aim at.

== Models ==
Image	Name(s)	Chinese name	Introduction (cal. year)	Vehicle description
Sedan
	VA3	捷達VA3	2019	Subcompact Sedan, facelift of the Chinese Volkswagen Jetta (based on the same platform as the SEAT Toledo Mk4)
	VA7	捷達VA7	2025	Compact Sedan (based on the same platform as the Volkswagen Sagitar)
	M6	捷達M6	2026	Battery electric mid-size Sedan
SUV
	VS5	捷達VS5	2019	Compact Crossover SUV (based on the same platform as the SEAT Ateca, Škoda Karoq and Volkswagen Tharu)
	VS7	捷達VS7	2020	Mid-size Crossover SUV (based on the same platform as the SEAT Tarraco, Škoda Kodiaq and Volkswagen Tiguan Allspace)
	VS8	捷達VS8	2025	Mid-size Crossover SUV (based on the same platform as the Škoda Kodiaq Mk2 and Volkswagen Tayron Mk2)

== Markets ==
=== China ===
==== Sales ====
- 2019 annual sales 162,000
- 2020 annual sales 155,000 (first full year as a standalone marque)
- 2021 annual sales 169,000
- 2022 annual sales 146,900
- 2023 annual sales 162,000
- 2024 annual sales 120,001 (the VA3 being the top seller)

=== Russia ===
At the beginning of July 2024, cars under the Jetta marque began to be sold in Russia. The cars are made by FAW Group but use Volkswagen technology like the Volkswagen Group MQB platform and the Volkswagen EA211 engine. Volkswagen had left Russia in 2023. Die Zeit contacted Volkswagen Group China, who denied that it or any of its joint ventures were exporting to Russia. Die Zeit found that the owner of the Russian website for Jetta and other companies involved in the export were divisions of FAW Group, suggesting that neither Volkswagen nor FAW-Volkswagen itself were involved.

=== Iran ===
In August 2023, the Jetta VS7 was introduced in Tehran, Iran alongside the Jetta VS5 by Mammut Khodro, the official distributor of Volkswagen in Iran. The two models by Jetta will be released in Iran by end of the year.

=== Uzbekistan ===
In June 2026, Volkswagen announced they will launch in Uzbekistan market with FAW-VW models being exported from China. As part of the launch, Jetta expanded into Uzbekistan market, with VS5 and VS7 being exported.
