= Jetta M6 =

Battery electric mid-size sedan

Overview
- Manufacturer: FAW-Volkswagen
- Production: August 2026 – present
- Assembly: China: Foshan (FAW-VW)

Body and chassis
- Class: Mid-size car
- Body style: 4-door sedan

Powertrain
- Power output: 113 kW (152 hp; 154 PS); 145 kW (194 hp; 197 PS)
- Battery: Supplied by CALB

Dimensions
- Wheelbase: 2,820 mm (111.0 in)
- Length: 4,806 mm (189.2 in)
- Width: 1,895 mm (74.6 in)
- Height: 1,500 mm (59.1 in)
- Curb weight: 1,557–1,628 kg (3,433–3,589 lb)

The Jetta M6 is a battery electric mid-size sedan produced by FAW-Volkswagen and marketed in China under the Jetta brand.

== Overview ==
The M6, is a Jetta first electric car, was revealed through MIIT filings in July 2026, before being officially revealed on 3 August. Pre-sales in China began on 28 September, ahead of its upcoming release in the fourth quarter of the year. Jetta announced a marketing partnership with tea chain ChaPanda meant to target younger consumers.

=== Design ===
It has a fastback body style with semi-hidden door handles and a charging port on the passenger-side front fender. It also comes with 17- or 18-inch alloy wheels, a panoramic sunroof and an active air intake. Carscoops' Brad Anderson described the front end as looking "suspiciously" like that of the Tesla Model 3.

=== Features ===
The interior, unveiled on 7 August 2026, has a large touchscreen and a small LCD instrument cluster in the dashboard. It has a 2-spoke steering wheel and the shifter is also mounted on the steering column. The center tunnel has a wireless phone charger, two cupholders and a hidden compartment. There is also a double-bed configuration for the rear seats. The car’s front seats can be completely folded flat, forming two rest areas. The higher-end trim has a comprehensive surround-view camera system with front and rear parking sensors.

== Powertrain ==
The base model comes with a 113 kW (152 hp; 154 PS) electric motor, while the higher-spec model has a more powerful 145 kW (194 hp; 197 PS) motor. Both variants come with motors supplied by Hunan CRRC Times Electric, and lithium-ion batteries supplied by CALB, with the final battery packs assembled directly by FAW-VW.
