= Jetta VS5 =

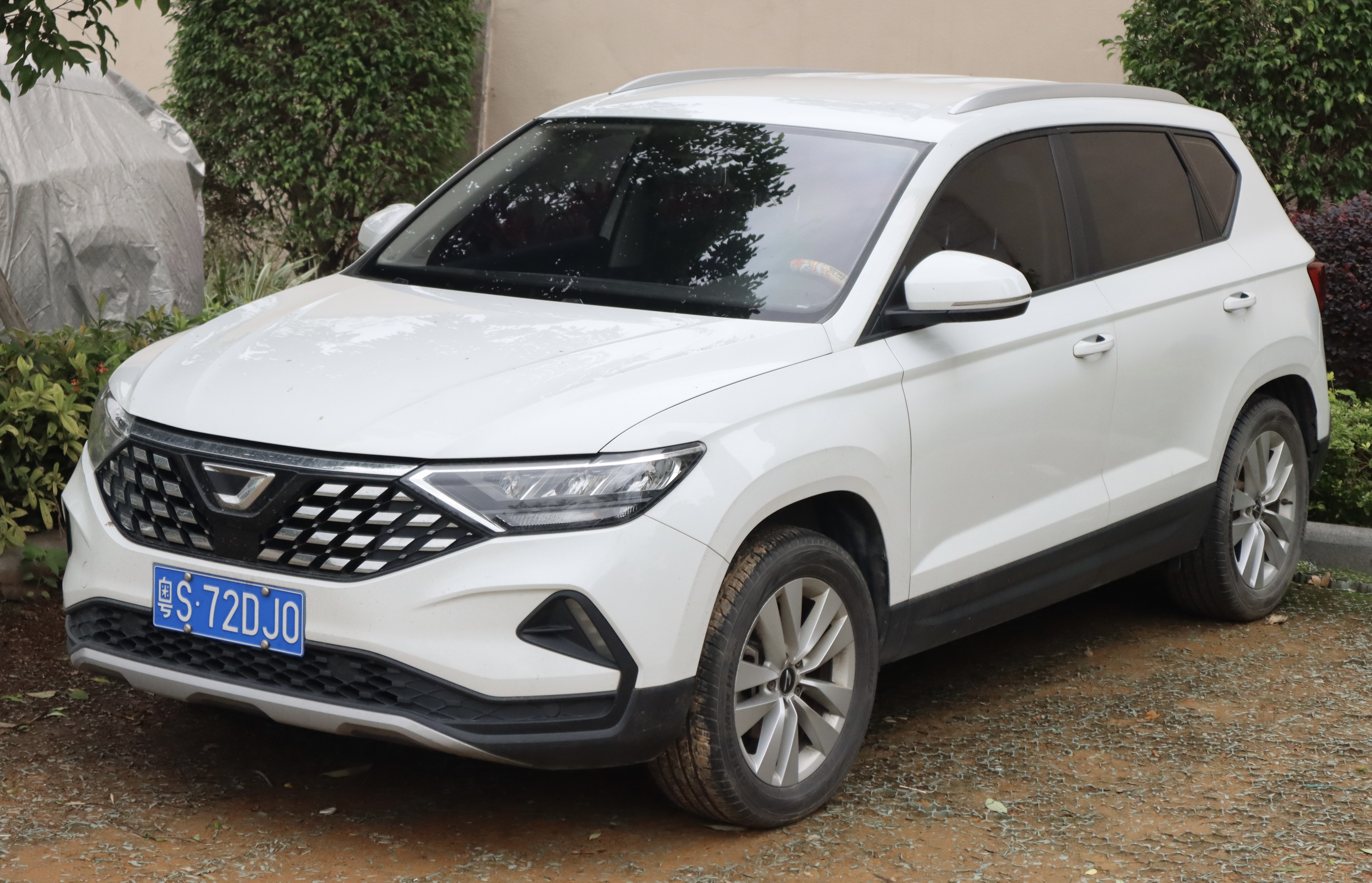

Overview
- Manufacturer: FAW-Volkswagen (Jetta)
- Also called: Volkswagen Jetta VS5 (Cambodia)
- Production: 2019–present
- Assembly: China: Chengdu (FAW-VW)

Body and chassis
- Class: Compact crossover SUV
- Body style: 5-door SUV
- Layout: Front-engine, front-wheel drive
- Platform: Volkswagen Group MQB A1
- Related: Jetta VS7; SEAT Ateca; Volkswagen Tharu/Taos; Škoda Karoq

Powertrain
- Engine: Petrol: 1.4 L EA211 TSI I4
- Transmission: 6-speed automatic

Dimensions
- Wheelbase: 2,630 mm (103.5 in)
- Length: 4,419 mm (174.0 in)
- Width: 1,841 mm (72.5 in)
- Height: 1,616 mm (63.6 in)

The Jetta VS5 is a compact crossover SUV jointly developed by FAW Group and Volkswagen Group for its China-exclusive brand, Jetta, and mainly manufactured by FAW-Volkswagen, a joint venture between the two companies since 2019.

== Overview ==
The Jetta VS5 was revealed at the Auto Shanghai, coinciding with the launch of the Jetta brand, a youth-focused brand for China named after the ever-popular sedan sold in China, the Volkswagen Jetta. It was released to the market at the 2019 Chengdu Motor Show as the first of two SUVs from the Jetta brand. The VS5 shares the same platform and body panels with the SEAT Ateca, Volkswagen Tharu and Škoda Karoq.

At the moment, the Jetta VS5 is exclusive to the Chinese market, with no plans for it to be sold elsewhere. It uses the EA211 engine, a 1.4-litre turbocharged inline four-cylinder making 150 PS (148 hp) and 250 N⋅m (180 lbf⋅ft) of torque.

In August 2023, the Jetta VS7 was introduced in Tehran, Iran alongside the Jetta VS5 and Jetta VA3 by Mammut Khodro, the official distributor of Volkswagen in Iran. The three models by Jetta will be released in Iran by end of the year.

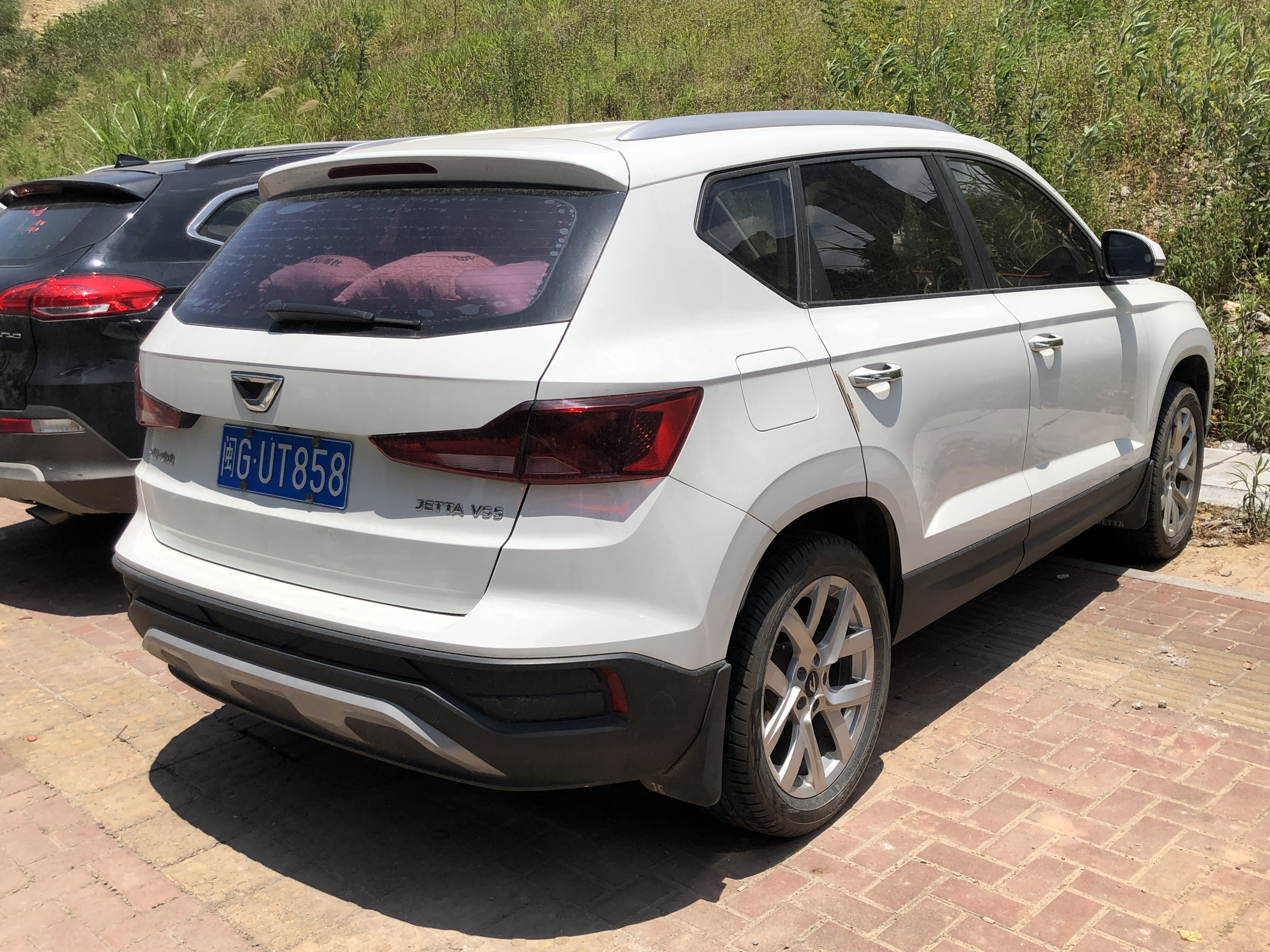
Rear view

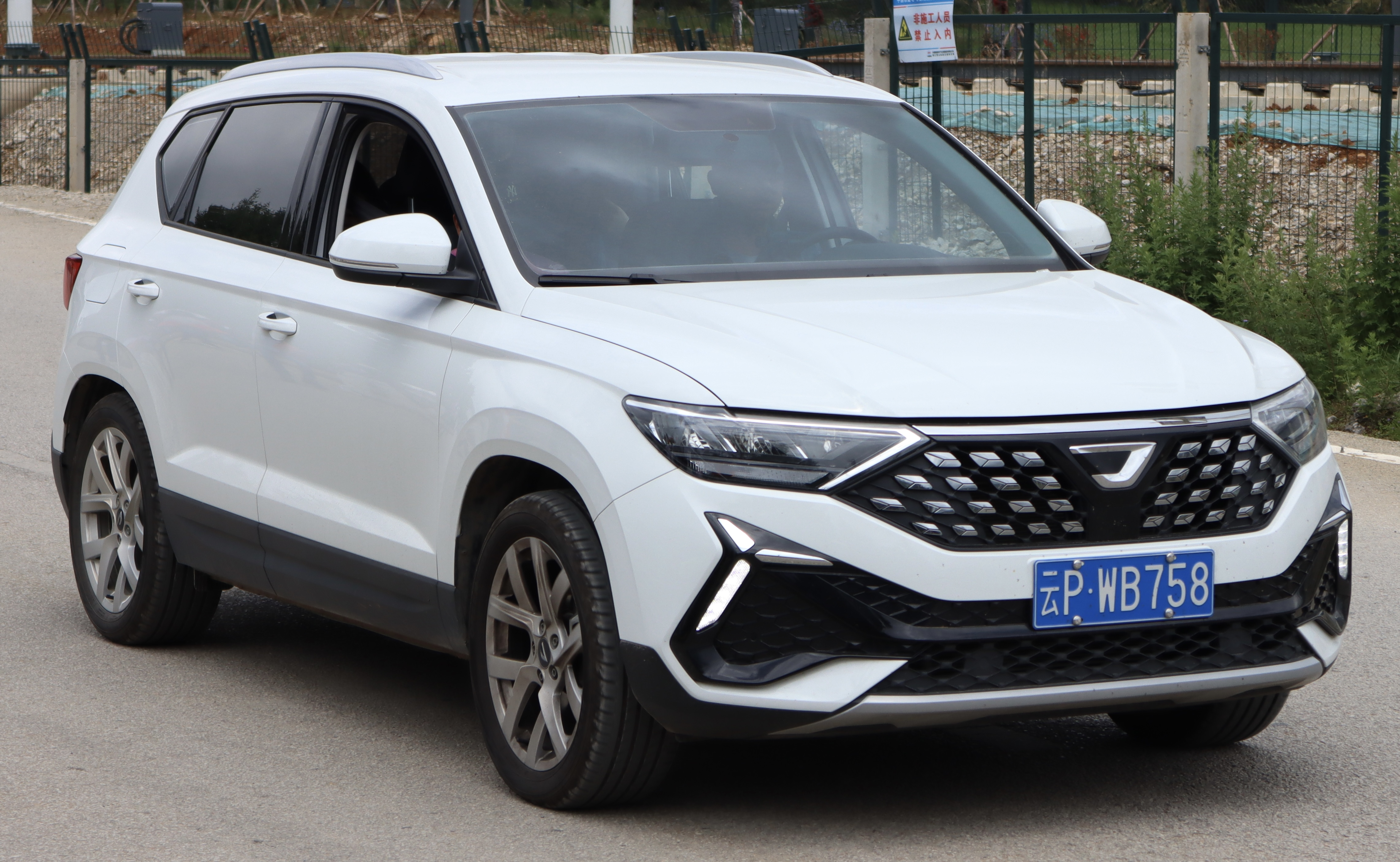
2022 facelift

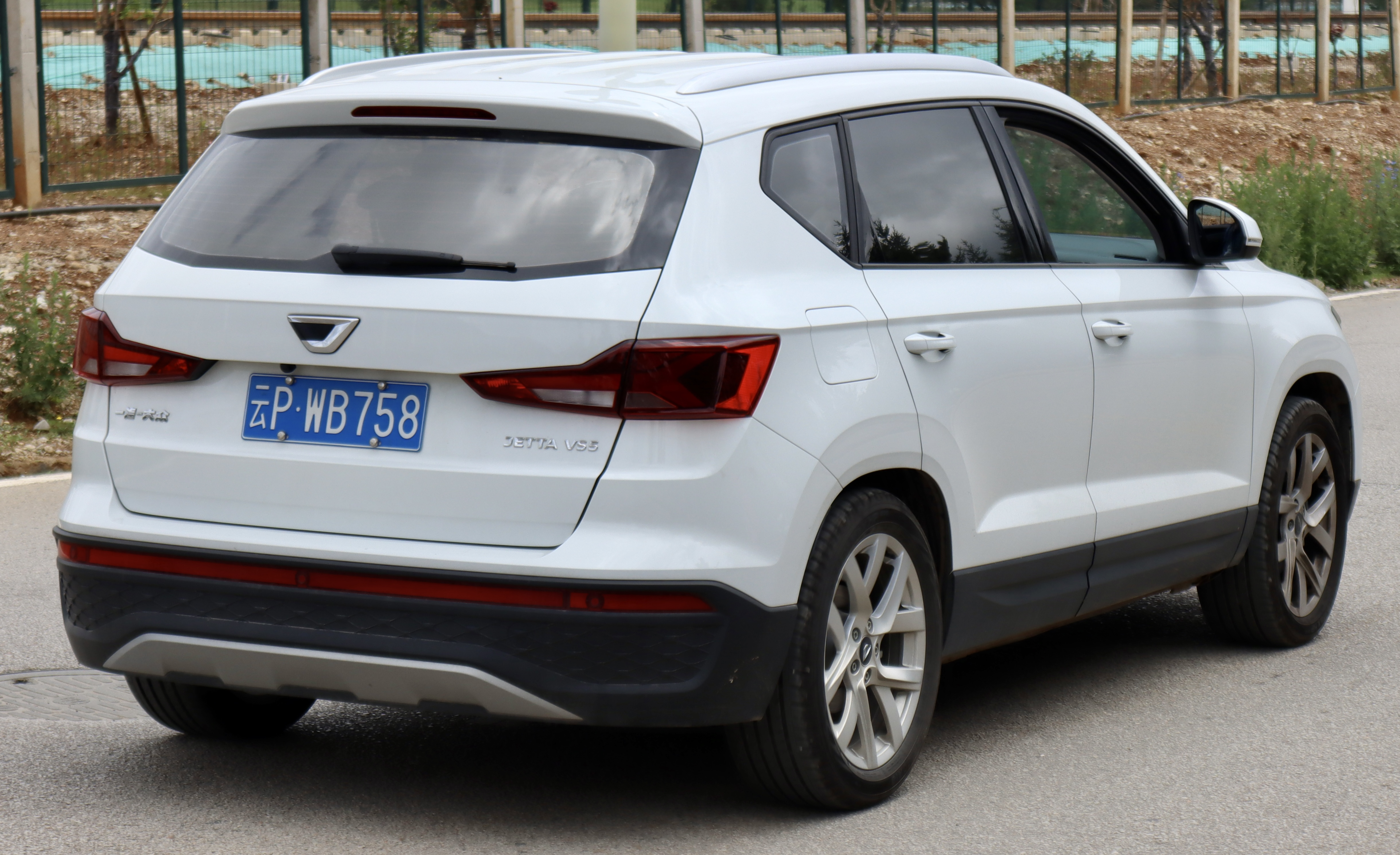
Rear view (2022 facelift)

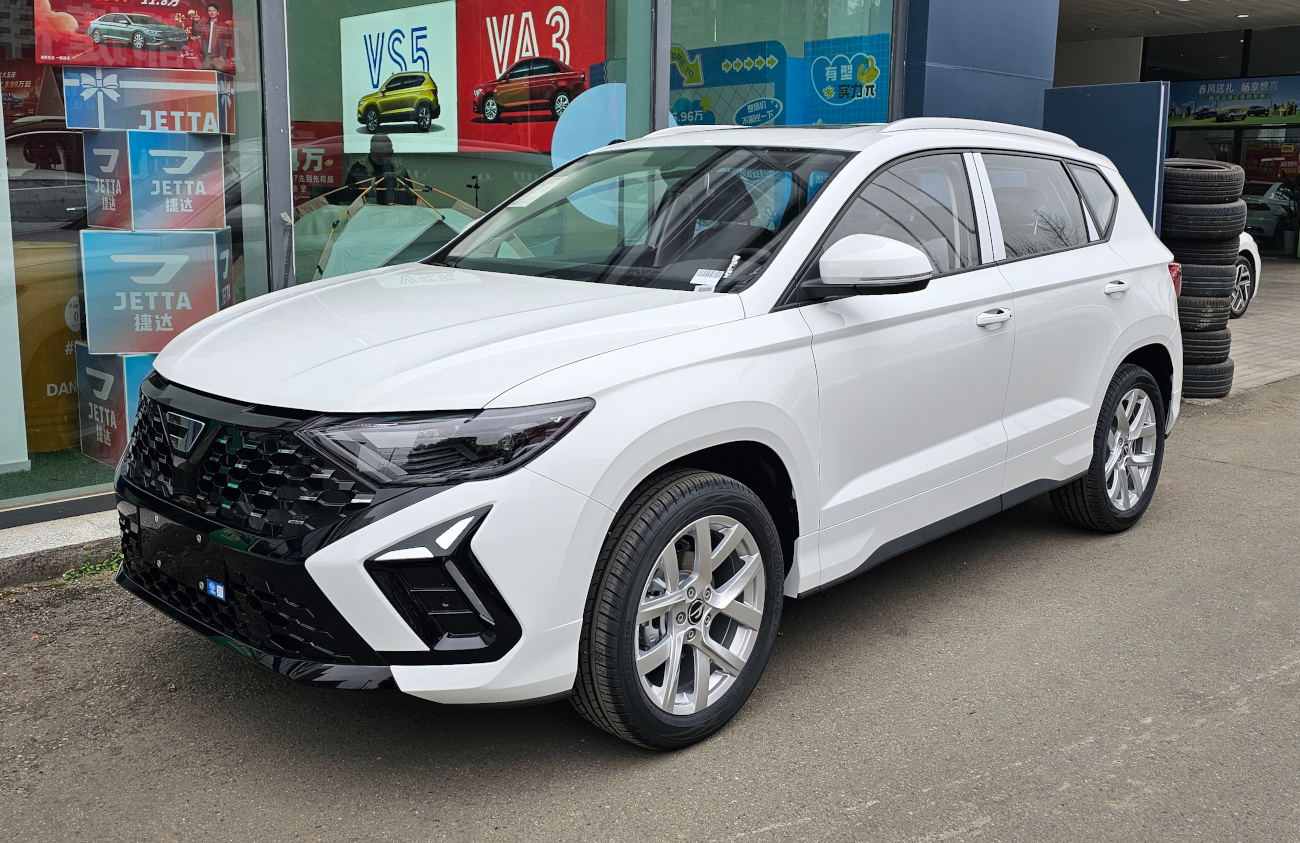
2024 facelift

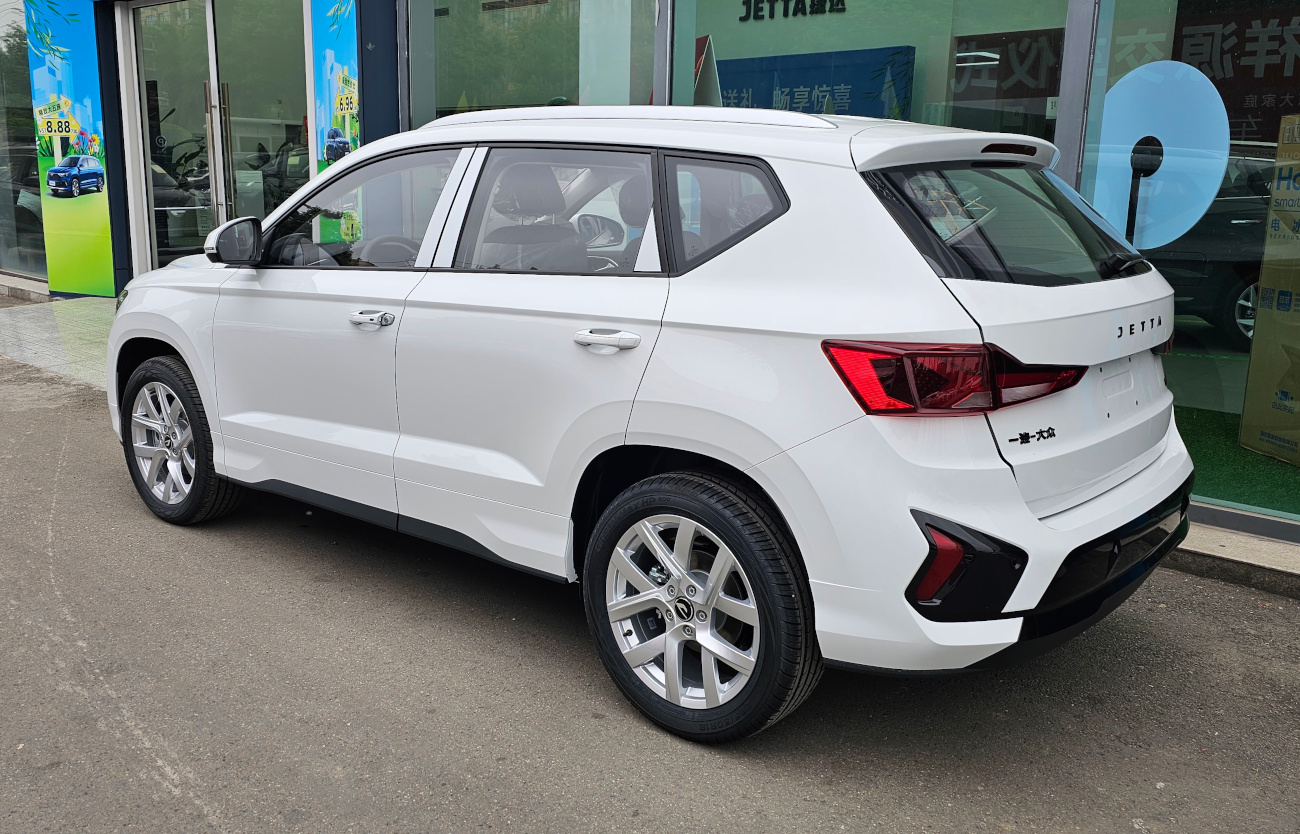
Rear view (2024 facelift)

== Sales ==
Year	China
2019	36,705
2020	81,077
2021	82,809
2022	
2023	71,848
2024	63,378
2025	53,652
