= Volkswagen Taos =

Compact crossover SUV

Volkswagen Taos/Tharu
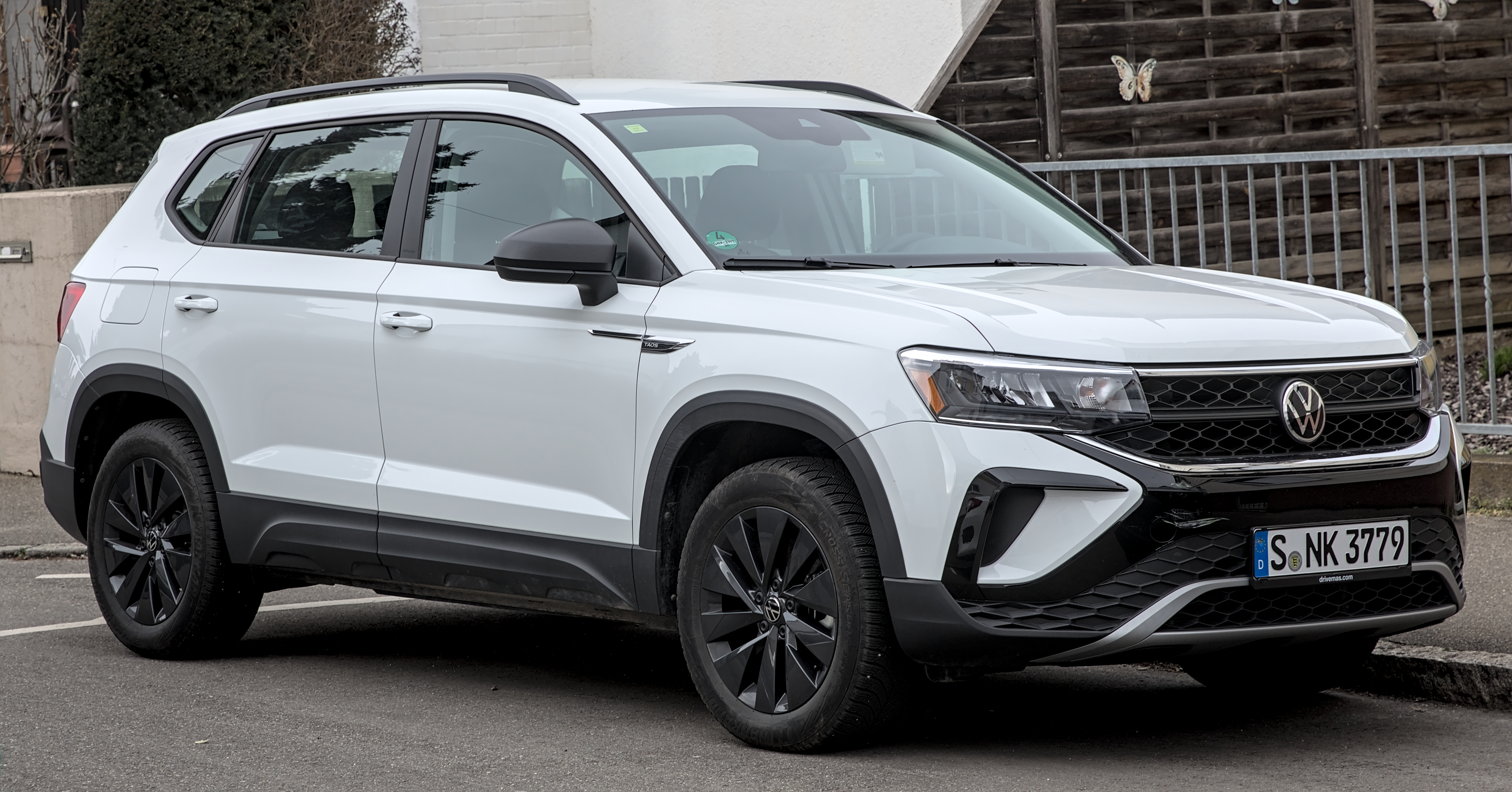

Overview
- Manufacturer: Volkswagen
- Also called: Volkswagen Tharu
- Production: 2018–present (China); October 2020 – present (Americas); 2021–2022 (Russia); 2021–2025 (Argentina)
- Model years: 2022–present
- Assembly: Mexico: Puebla (Volkswagen de México); Argentina: General Pacheco (Volkswagen Argentina); Russia: Nizhny Novgorod (GAZ); China: Yizheng, Jiangsu; Ningbo, Zhejiang; Ürümqi, Xinjiang (SAIC-VW, Tharu)
- Designer: Klaus Bischoff and Johannes Brandsch (Tharu)

Body and chassis
- Class: Compact crossover SUV (C)
- Body style: 5-door SUV
- Layout: Front-engine, front-wheel-drive Front-engine, all-wheel-drive
- Platform: Volkswagen Group MQB A1
- Related: SEAT Ateca; Škoda Karoq; Jetta VS5

Powertrain
- Engine: Petrol: 1.2 L TSI 115 I4; 1.4 L TSI 150 I4; 1.5 L TSI 160 I4; 1.6 L MPI 110 I4; 2.0 L TSI 190 I4
- Transmission: 5-speed manual 6-speed manual 6-speed automatic 8-speed automatic 7-speed DSG
- Battery: 44.1 kWh (e-Tharu)
- Electric range: 315–415 km (195.7–257.9 mi) (e-Tharu, NEDC)

Dimensions
- Wheelbase: 2,690 mm (105.9 in); 2,680 mm (105.5 in) (China); 2,638 mm (103.9 in) (Russia)
- Length: 4,465 mm (175.8 in); 4,453 mm (175.3 in) (China); 4,417 mm (173.9 in) (Russia)
- Width: 1,841 mm (72.5 in)
- Height: 1,602–1,635 mm (63.1–64.4 in)

The Volkswagen Taos is a compact crossover SUV marketed by Volkswagen. It was first released in October 2018 as the Volkswagen Tharu in China, while the Taos was released in October 2020 as a restyled version of the Tharu for the North American, South American, and Russian markets. As of 2025, for the South American and Chinese markets the vehicle is positioned between the T-Cross and the Tiguan in Volkswagen's crossover SUV lineup. It is not marketed in core European market.

The Taos is named after Taos, New Mexico. The Tharu name is derived after the eponymous Tharu people, an ethnic group indigenous to Nepal and Northern India.

== Overview ==
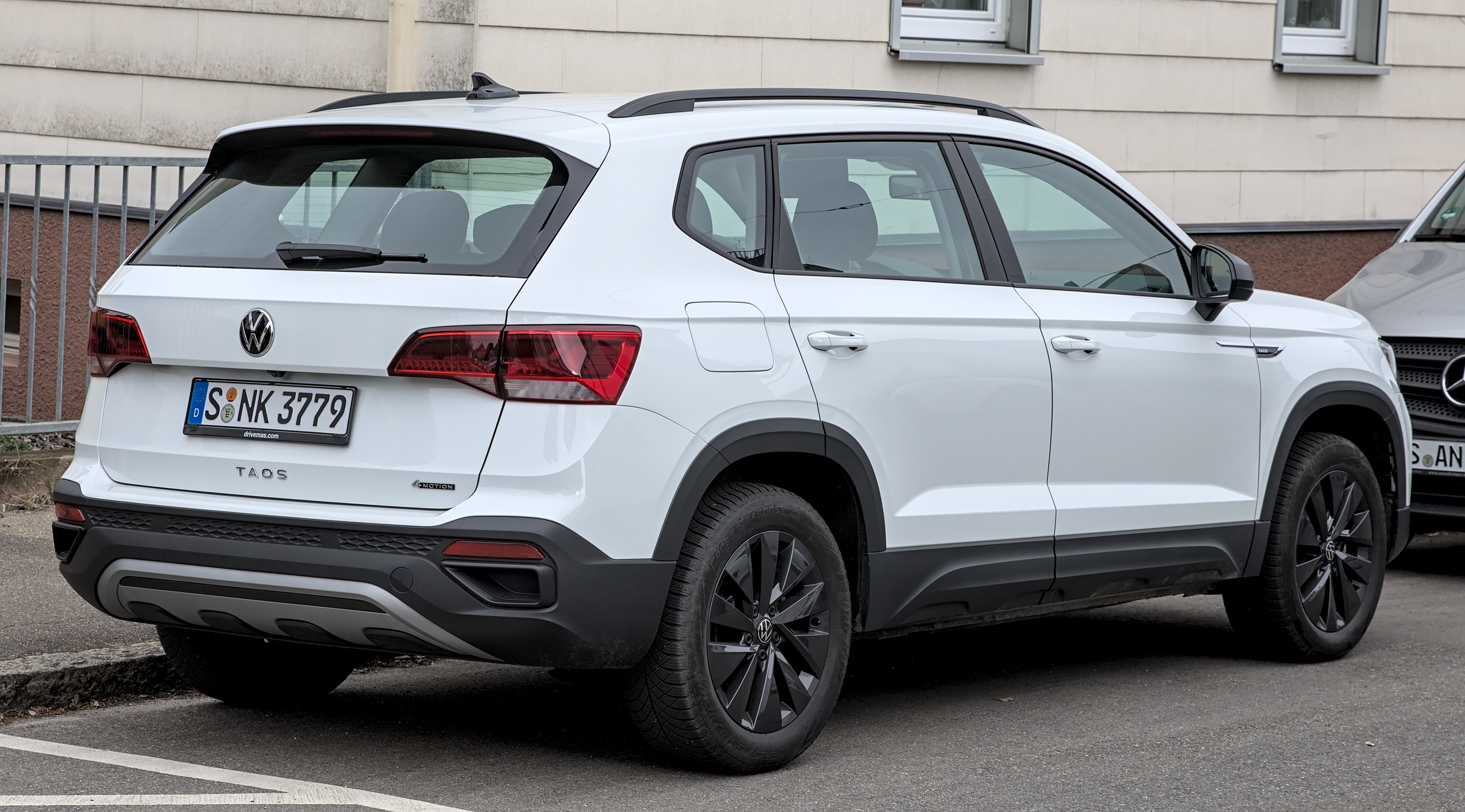
Rear view

The Taos/Tharu is based on the Volkswagen Group MQB A1, with its platform closely related and several sheet metals shared with the SEAT Ateca, Škoda Karoq and the Jetta VS5. Known as the 'Project Tarek' during development, the Taos/Tharu is considered the first Chinese-developed VW product that is sold outside China. Volkswagen's brand sales chief Jürgen Stackmann said the project "turned from a regional project into a global project." Global annual sales for the vehicle were projected at 400,000 units.

== Markets ==
=== North America ===
The Taos debuted for the North American market on 13 October 2020 for the 2022 model year. It is the fifth addition to the Volkswagen SUV family in the last four years. The Mexican-built Taos slots directly below the Tiguan, which is solely available in a long-wheelbase guise in the North American market, while acting as an indirect replacement for the discontinued Golf.

The Taos for the US and Canadian market is powered by a 1.5-litre, four-cylinder turbocharged petrol engine known as the TSI Evo, borrowed from VW's European models. The engine packs 158 hp (160 PS; 118 kW) and 184 lb⋅ft (249 N⋅m; 25 kg⋅m) at 1,750 rpm. Front-wheel-drive models feature an 8-speed automatic transmission, while the 4Motion all-wheel drive is coupled with a 7-speed DSG transmission. For the 2025 model, the DSG was replaced with an 8-speed automatic transmission for all models.

Volkswagen's Digital Cockpit system is standard on all trims, replacing the physical instrument cluster dials with a reconfigurable 12.3-inch display. The Taos can function as a Wi-Fi hotspot and is available with a wireless charge pad. All but the base model feature an 8.0-inch touchscreen and the latest MIB3 infotainment software. Volkswagen sells the Taos in S, SE, and SEL trims.

The Taos for the Mexican market is powered by a 1.4-litre, four-cylinder turbocharged petrol engine from the Volkswagen EA211 TSI engine family, paired with a 6-speed automatic transmission. The 1.4 TSI engine produces 150 PS (148 hp; 110 kW) and 25.5 kg⋅m (250 N⋅m; 184 lb⋅ft) of torque. In Mexico, the Taos is available in Trendline, Comfortline, and Highline trims. All trims are only available in FWD drivetrain configuration.

==== Facelift ====
For the 2025 model year, the Taos received a mid-cycle refresh in North America, with updated bodywork, a revised 1.5-litre turbocharged engine making 174 hp (130 kW; 176 PS), and an 8-speed automatic transmission now standard on all models.

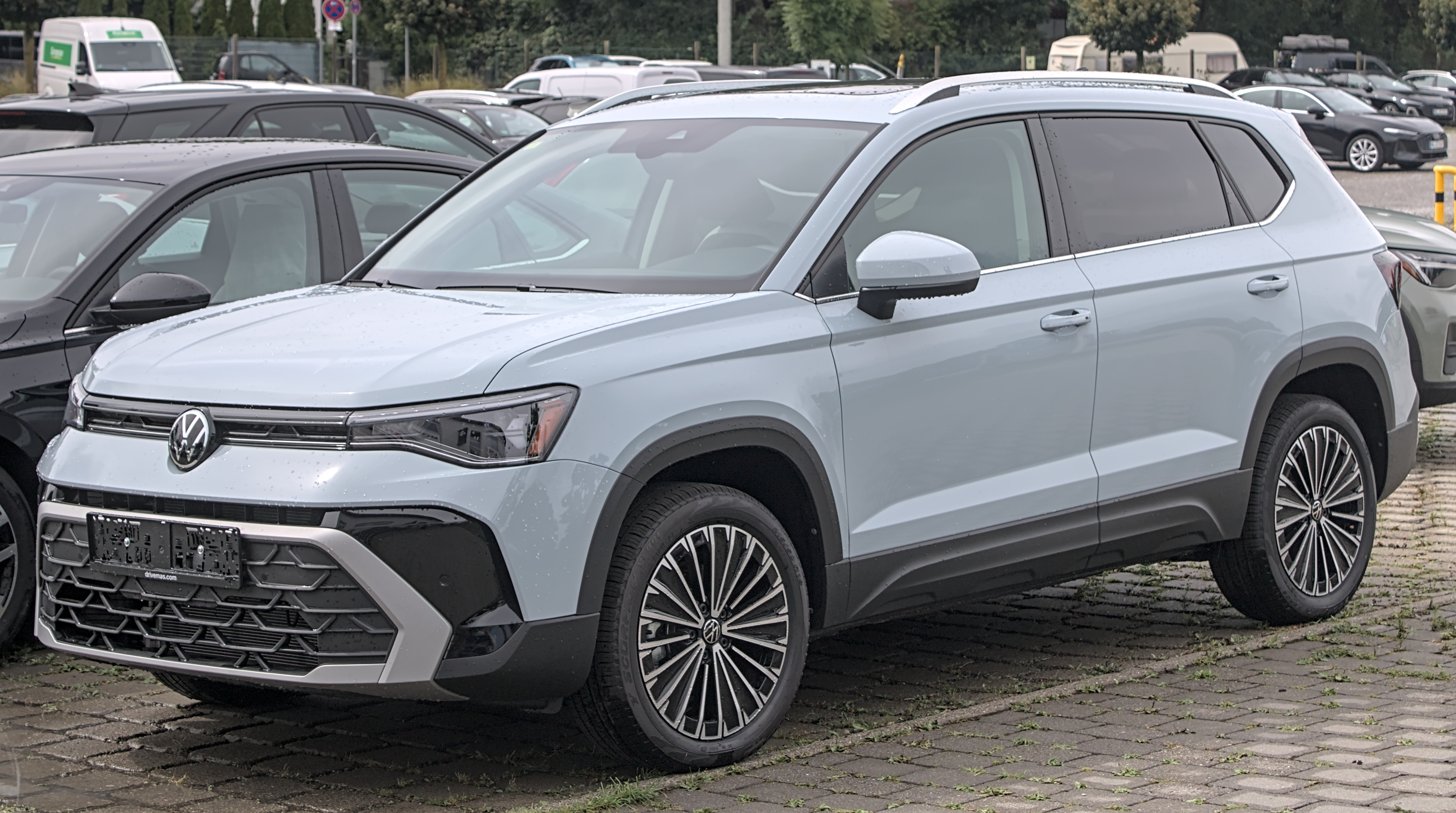
2025 Volkswagen Taos

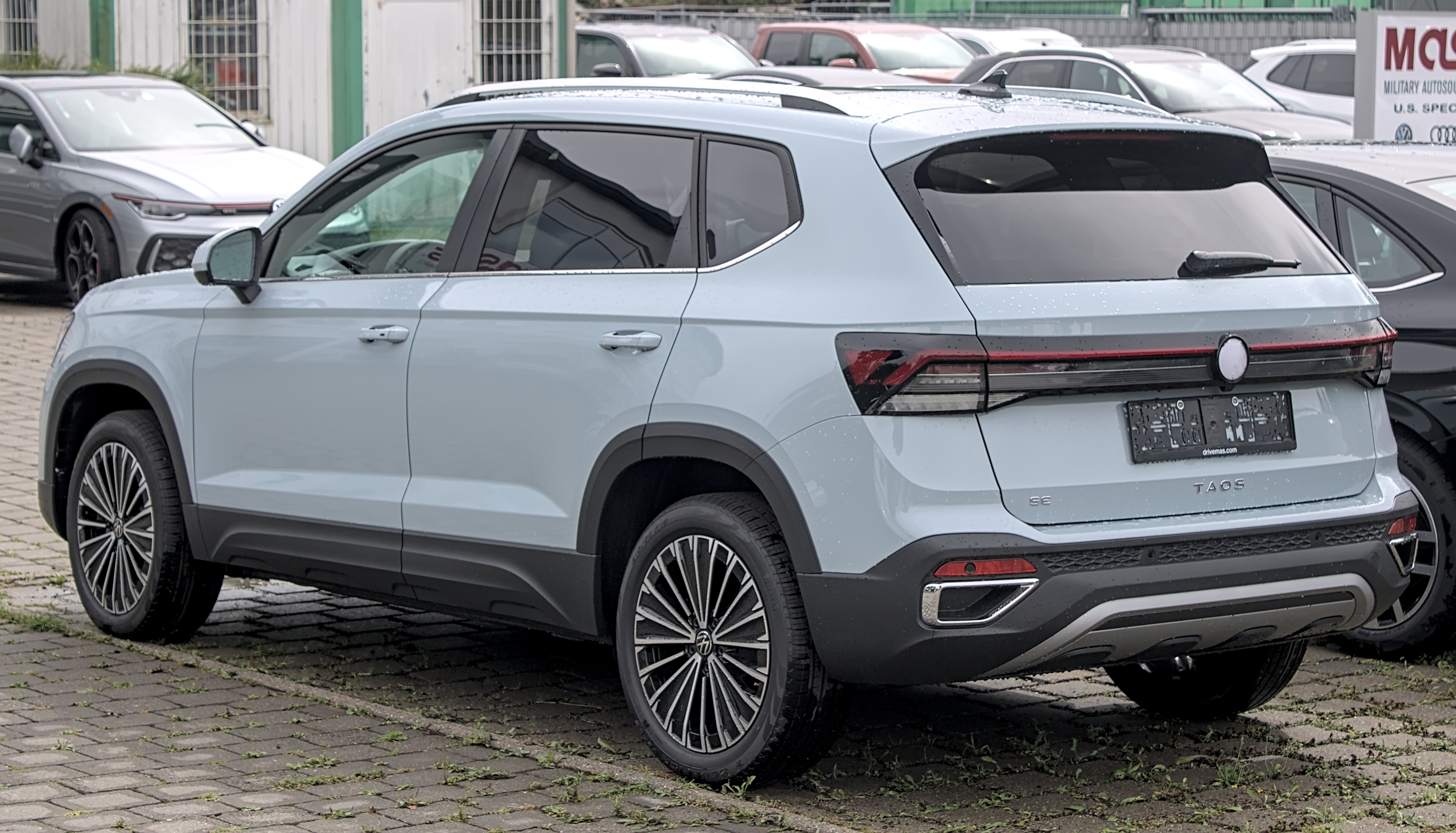
Rear view

=== South America ===
Introduced on 13 October 2020, the vehicle is also sold as the Taos with an identical styling to the North American Taos. For this market, the vehicle is produced in General Pacheco plant in Argentina. It occupies a segment between the T-Cross and Tiguan. It is the first C-segment SUV made in Argentina. Instead of the TSI Evo engine, the Argentinian-built Taos is powered by a 1.4-litre 4-cylinder TSI petrol engine producing 150 hp (152 PS; 112 kW) and 25.5 kg⋅m (250 N⋅m; 184 lb⋅ft) which is sourced from the São Carlos engine plant in Brazil and supports flex fuel. The engine is coupled with a 6-speed automatic transmission.

As of 2022, the Argentine version contains 20% locally made parts. 70% of its production is exported.

=== Russia ===
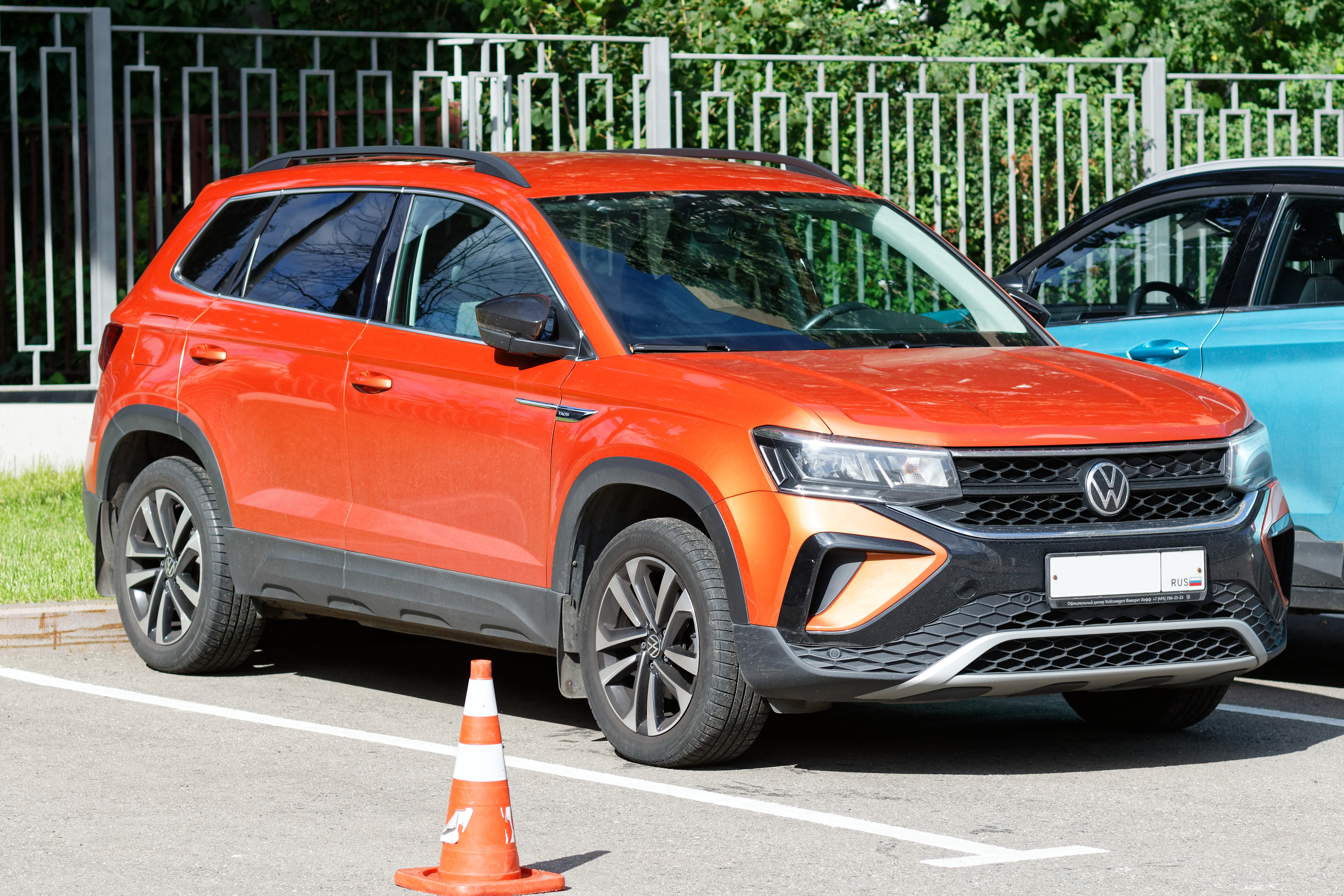
Russian market Taos

The Russian-market Taos was announced on 4 March 2021. It is assembled in Nizhny Novgorod by GAZ alongside the similar Škoda Karoq. As a result, the Taos for the Russian market uses an identical rear quarter panel and chassis from the Karoq, making it shorter in length and wheelbase compared to the Americas-market Taos and the Chinese-market Tharu, and requiring a different tailgate panel, rear taillights and rear bumper to be installed.

Engine options available are a 1.6-litre MPI producing 110 hp (112 PS; 82 kW) and 1.4-litre TSI producing 150 hp (152 PS; 112 kW). The base engine comes with a 5-speed manual or 6-speed automatic transmission and front-wheel drive, while the TSI is mated to either an 8-speed automatic for the FWD version or a 7-speed DSG transmission with 4Motion AWD. The range will include Respect, Status and Exclusive trim levels.

=== Powertrain ===
Volkswagen Taos
Petrol engines
Model	Displacement	Power	Torque	Transmission	Markets
1.4 TSI 150	1,395 cc I4	150 PS (110 kW; 148 hp)	250 N⋅m (184 lb⋅ft)	6-speed automatic	Latin America
1.4 TSI 150	1,395 cc I4	150 PS (110 kW; 148 hp)	250 N⋅m (184 lb⋅ft)	8-speed automatic or 7-speed DSG	Russia
1.5 TSI 160	1,498 cc I4	160 PS (118 kW; 158 hp)	250 N⋅m (184 lb⋅ft)	8-speed automatic or 7-speed DSG	United States and Canada
1.6 MPI 110	1,598 cc I4	110 PS (81 kW; 108 hp)	155 N⋅m (114 lb⋅ft)	5-speed manual or 6-speed automatic	Russia

=== China (Tharu) ===
The Tharu was presented as a near production model called the 'Powerful Family SUV' in March 2018. Built by SAIC Volkswagen, the vehicle became available in China in late October 2018. The vehicle was assembled in three locations, including in Xinjiang Uygur Autonomous Region in the city of Ürümqi.

It is offered with several powertrain options, including one electric version called the e-Tharu. The base model of the Tharu has a torsion axle, the higher versions have a multi link suspension.

Volkswagen cooperated with the headphone manufacturer Beats Electronics to incorporate the Beats audio system in the vehicle.

The Chinese-built Tharu was launched in the Philippine market on 29 September 2023. It is available in both the SE and SEL trim levels. It was discontinued in September 2025 following the termination of distributorship agreement between AC Industrials and Volkswagen Group.

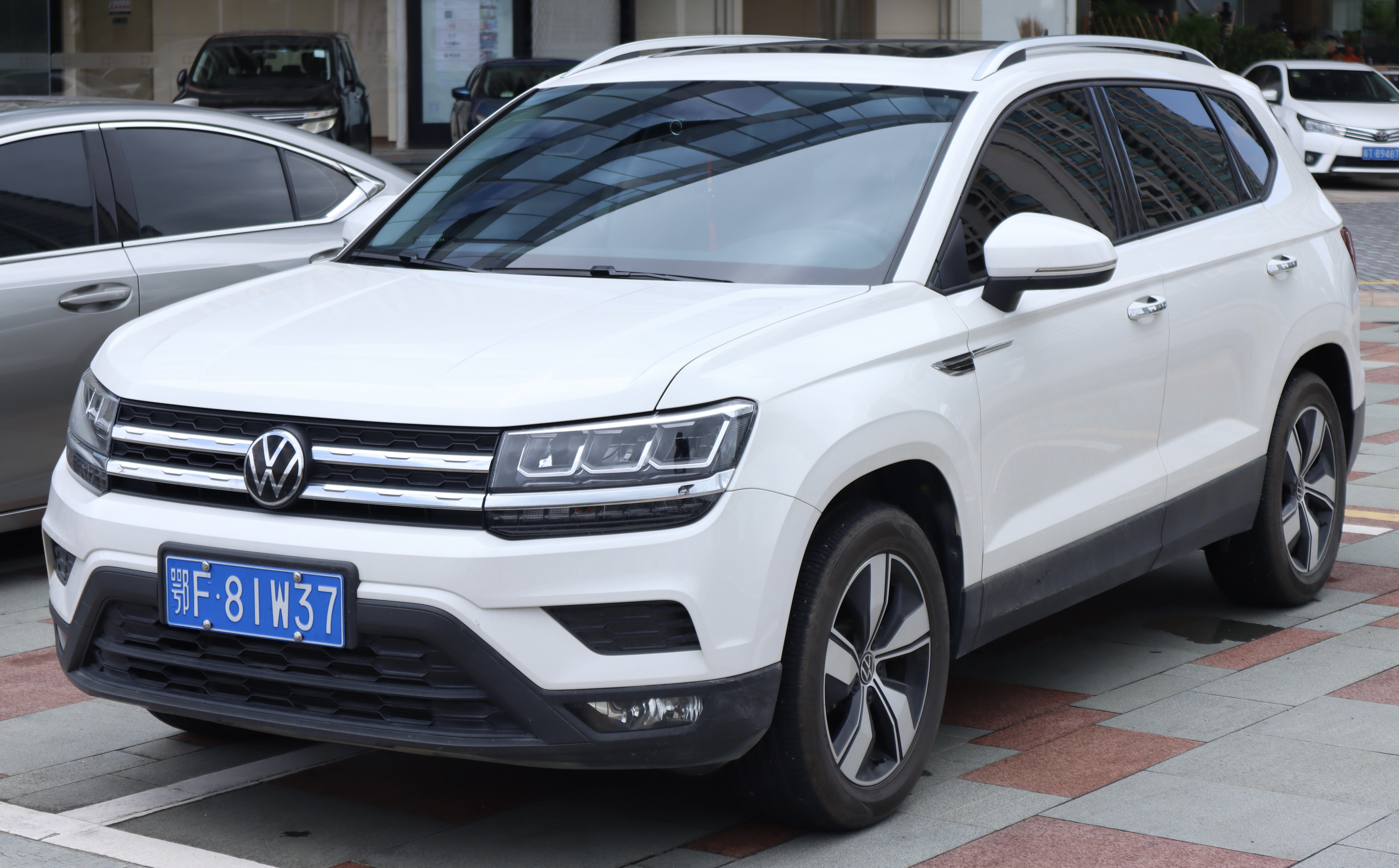
2020 Volkswagen Tharu (China)

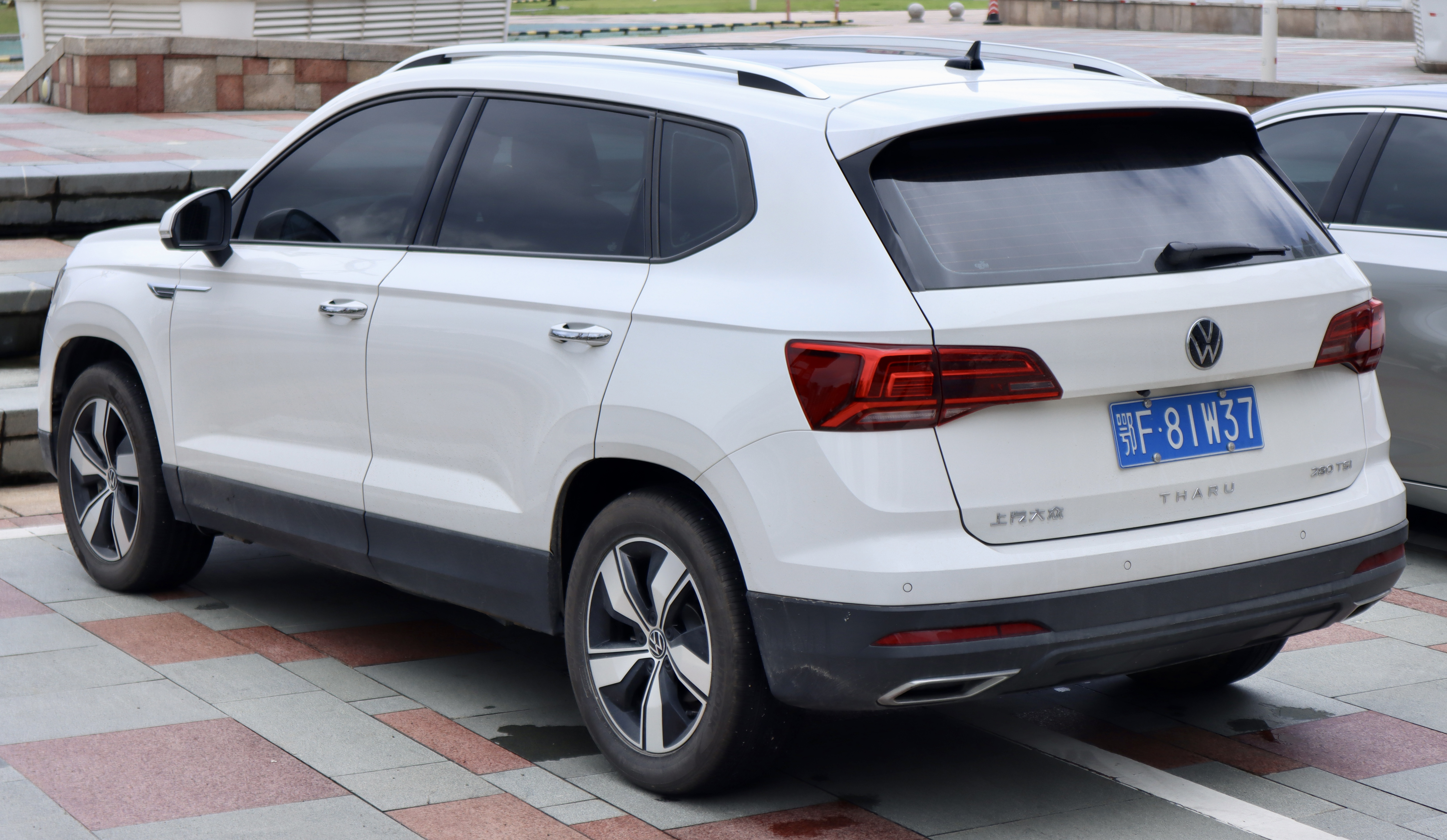
2020 Volkswagen Tharu (China)

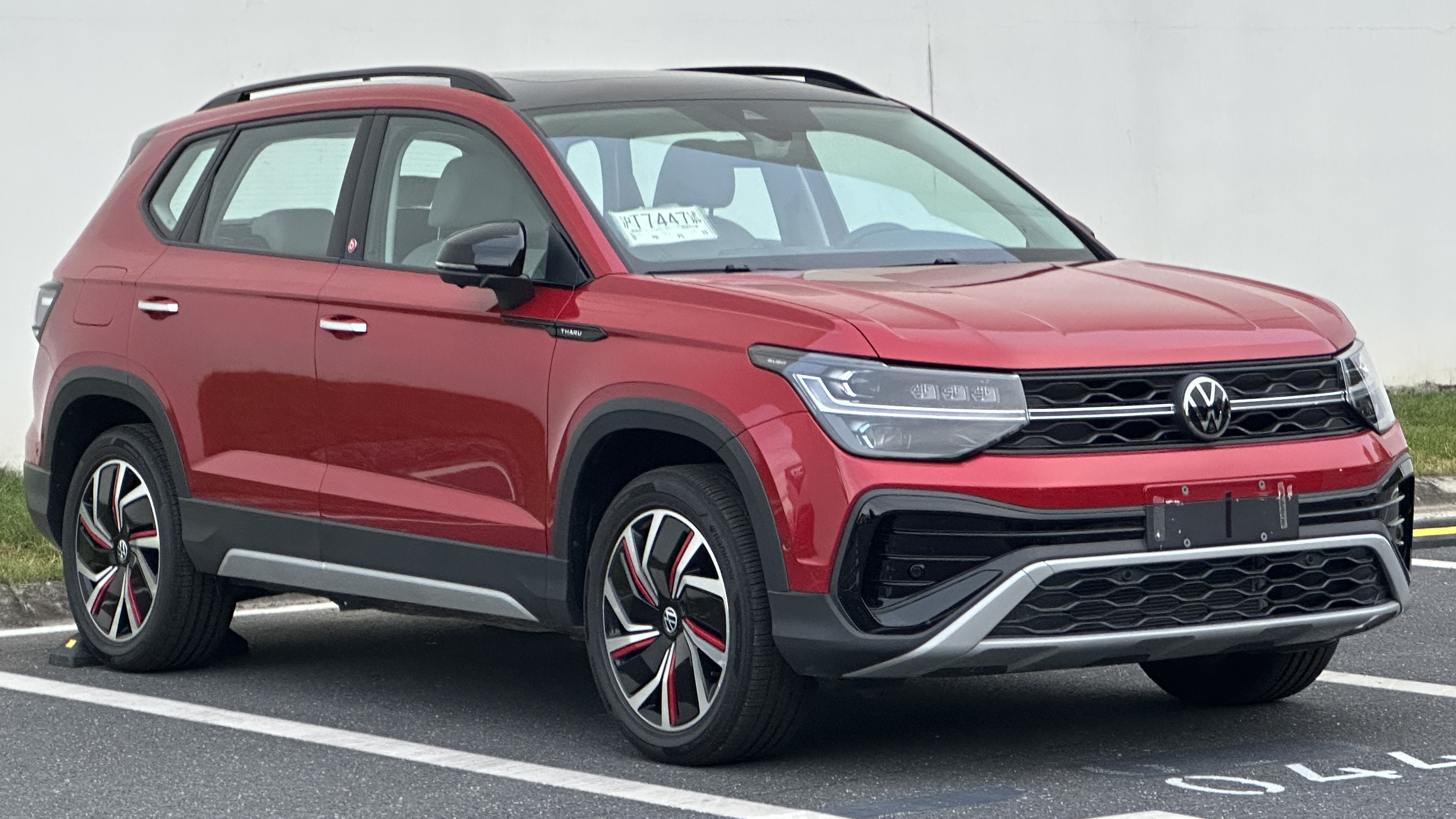
2023 Volkswagen Tharu facelift (China)

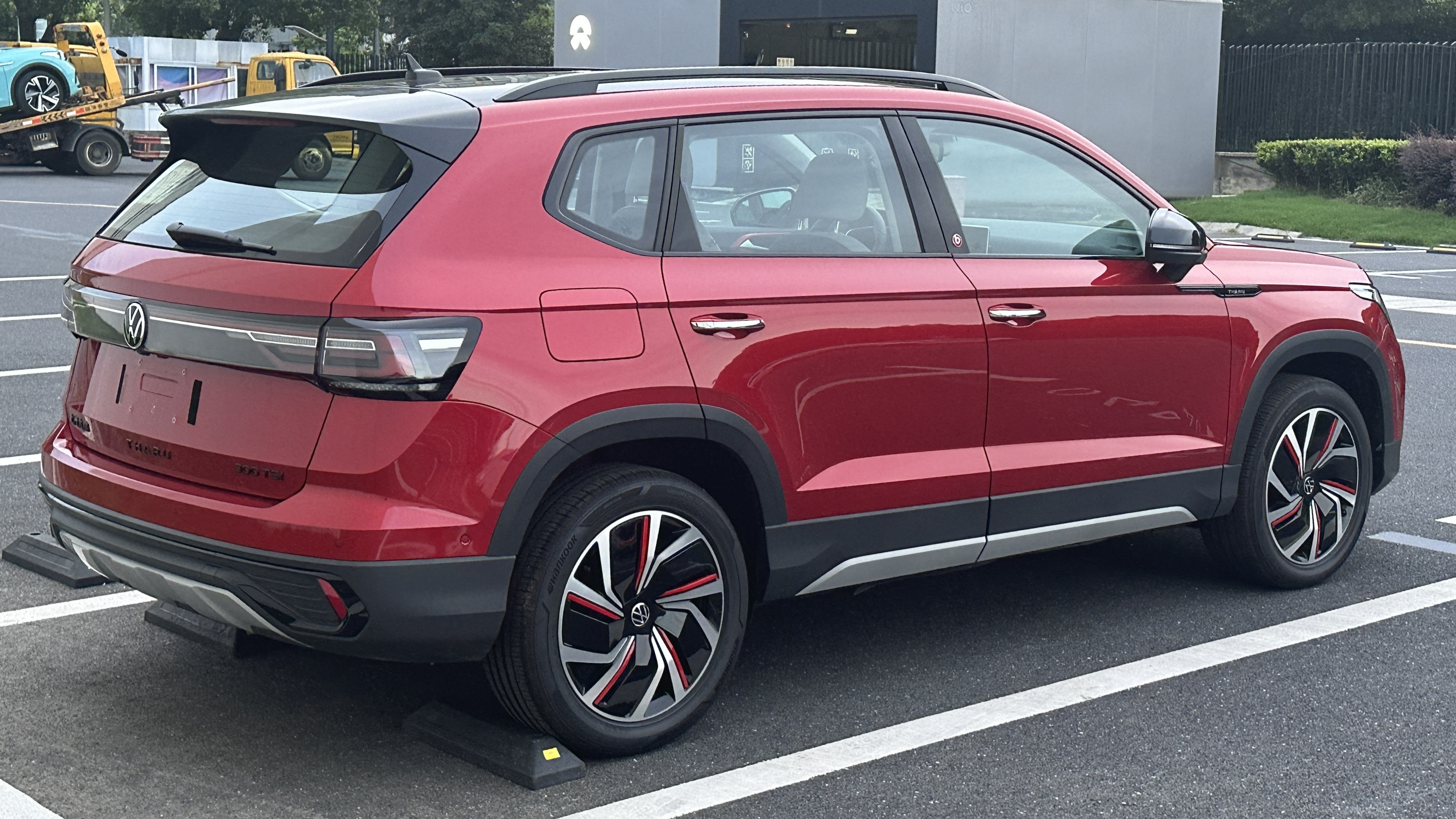
2023 Volkswagen Tharu facelift (China)

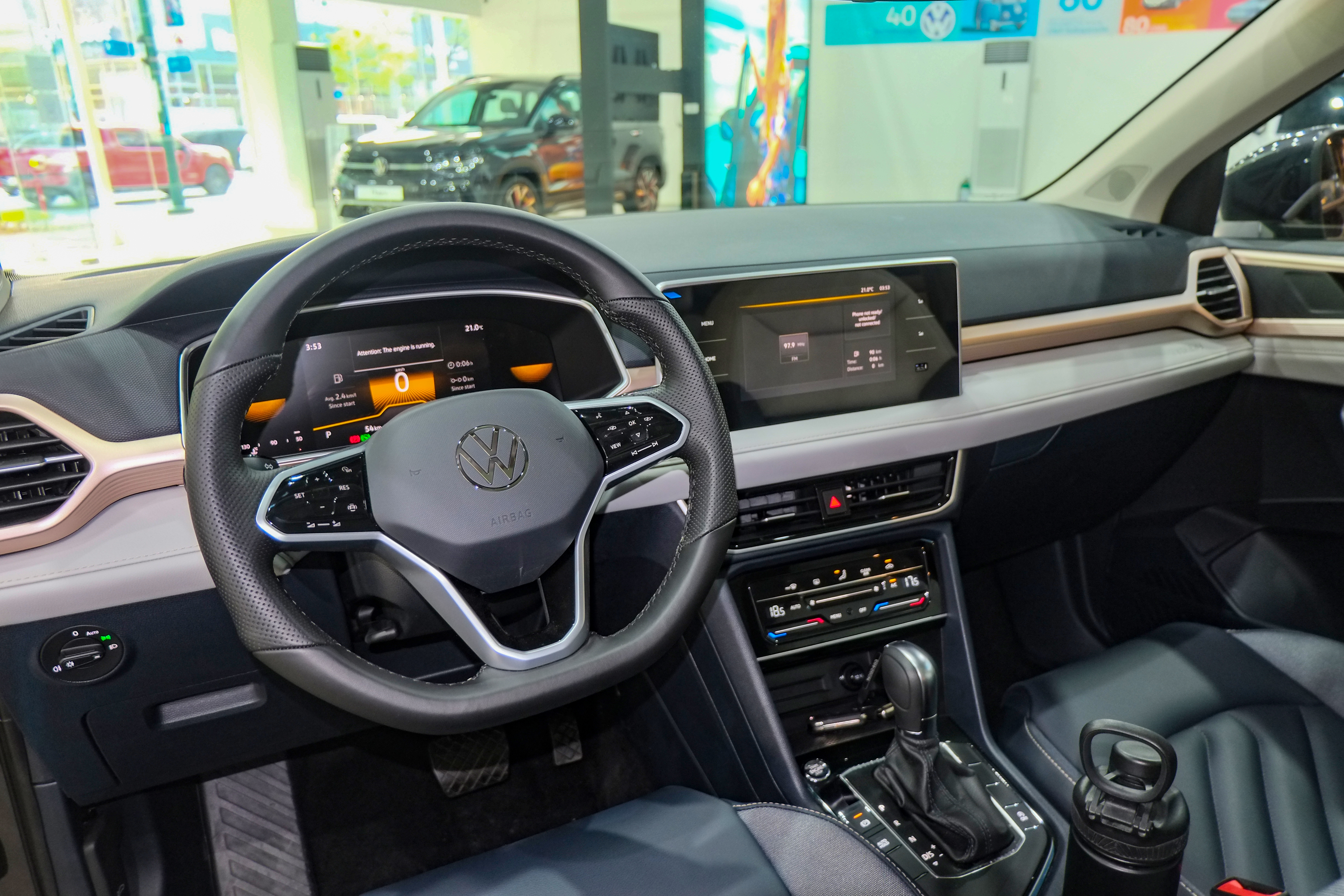
Volkswagen Tharu 300 TSI interior

==== Powertrain ====
Volkswagen Tharu
Petrol engines
Model	Series	Displacement	Power	Torque	Transmission
1.2 TSI		1,197 cc I4	118 PS (87 kW; 116 hp)	200 N⋅m (148 lb⋅ft)	6-speed manual or 7-speed DSG
1.4 TSI '280 TSI'	EA211	1,395 cc I4	150 PS (110 kW; 148 hp)	250 N⋅m (184 lb⋅ft)	6-speed manual or 7-speed DSG
2.0 TSI '330 TSI' 4Motion	EA888	1,984 cc I4	190 PS (140 kW; 187 hp)	320 N⋅m (236 lb⋅ft)	7-speed DSG

==== e-Tharu ====
The electric version of the Tharu was released in November 2020. It is equipped with an electric motor that produces 136 PS (100 kW; 134 hp) and 290 N⋅m (214 lb⋅ft) of torque. The vehicle is powered by a 44.1-kWh battery pack rated at 315 km (196 mi) of range (NEDC). Driven at a constant speed of 60 km/h (37 mph), the e-Tharu is claimed to be able to travel 415 km (258 mi) between charges.

== Safety ==
The Taos has ventilated front disc brakes and solid rear ones.

=== Latin NCAP ===
The Latin American Taos with 6 airbags, airbag switch, UN127 pedestrian safety standard, ESC, ISA, full SBR, and optional collision avoidance system received 5 stars from Latin NCAP 3.0 in 2021 (similar to Euro NCAP 2014).

Latin NCAP 3.0 test results Volkswagen Taos + 6 Airbags (2021, similar to Euro NCAP 2014)
Test	Points	%
Overall:	5 /5 stars	
Adult occupant:	36.09	90%
Child occupant:	44.00	90%
Pedestrian:	22.49	61%
Safety assist:	36.57	85%

Latin NCAP 3.5 test results Volkswagen Taos + 6 Airbags (2025, similar to Euro NCAP 2017)
Test	Points	%
Overall:	5 /5 stars	
Adult occupant:	36.28	91%
Child occupant:	44.00	90%
Pedestrian:	32.48	68%
Safety assist:	39.63	92%

=== IIHS ===
The 2022 Taos was tested by the IIHS:

IIHS scores
Small overlap front (Driver)	Good	
Small overlap front (Passenger)	Acceptable	
Moderate overlap front	Good	
Side	Good	
Roof strength	Good	
Head restraints and seats	Acceptable	
Headlights	Good / Marginal	varies by trim/option
Front crash prevention (Vehicle-to-Vehicle)	Superior	optional
Front crash prevention (Vehicle-to-Pedestrian, day)	Basic	optional
Child seat anchors (LATCH) ease of use	Good	

== Sales ==
Calendar year	China	U.S.	Mexico	Brazil	Argentina
2018	24,873				
2019	138,235				
2020	146,926				
2021	125,717	31,682	9,567	7,732	2,583
2022	120,561	59,103	7,031	11,225	8,449
2023	95,263	58,890	18,972	15,990	11,451
2024	109,387	63,882	20,126	17,565	13,190
2025	142,825	55,198	21,189	12,924	16,523
