= List of Volkswagen Group factories =

Countries with Volkswagen Group factories around the world

This list of Volkswagen Group factories details the current and former manufacturing facilities operated by the automotive concern Volkswagen Group, and its subsidiaries. These include its mainstream marques of Volkswagen Passenger Cars, Audi, SEAT, Škoda and Volkswagen Commercial Vehicles, along with their premium marques of Ducati, Lamborghini, Porsche, Bentley, and Bugatti, and also includes plants of their major controlling interest in the Swedish truck-maker Scania.

The German Volkswagen Group is the largest automaker in the world as of 2015. As of 2019, it has 136 production plants, and employs around 670,000 people around the world who produce a daily output of over 26,600 motor vehicles and related major components, for sale in over 150 countries.

In 2026 it was announced four factories to be shut down, Volkswagen is reportedly considering closing four major German factories in Emden, Hanover, Zwickau and the Audi plant in Neckarsulm, restructuring plans could put over 47,796 jobs at risk in Germany and up to 100,000 globally.

== Factories ==
Notes: In the second column of the table:- the 'factory VIN ID code', this is indicated in the 11th digit of the vehicles' 17 digit Vehicle Identification Number, and this factory code is only assigned to plants which produce actual completed vehicles. Component factories which do not produce complete vehicles do not have this factory ID code.

Plant name	Plant VIN ID code(s)	Location (continent, country)	Location (town / city, state / region)	Current vehicle production	Former vehicle production	Automotive products & components	Year opened	Year closed	Number of employees	Note	Plant coordinates
Accra		Africa, Ghana	Accra	VW Polo VW Passat VW T-Cross; VW Tiguan; VW Teramont VW Amarok			2020			Universal Motors Limited plant. Universal Motors is VW's local distributor.	
Anchieta	P 0 (Polo 9N)	South; America, Brazil	São Bernardo do Campo, Greater São Paulo, São Paulo state	VW Saveiro; VW Polo Mk6; VW Virtus; VW Nivus	VW Beetle; VW Fox; VW Gol; VW 1600 TL/1600 sedan VW 1600 Variant/Variant II; VW Brasília; VW SP1/SP2; VW Polo Mk4; VW Passat (B1); VW Santana (B2); VW Santana Quantum/Quantum (B2); VW Kombi (T1); VW Kombi (T2); Ford Versailles/Ford Galaxy (Argentina); Ford Royale	Engines, Gearboxes	1959		7,300	Oldest currently operating Volkswagen Group factory outside of Europe. Part of Volkswagen do Brasil Indústria de Veículos Automotores Ltda. Part of Autolatina venture with Ford from 1987-1996.	23°44′07″S 46°32′48″W
Angers	9 Scania	Europe, France	Angers, Maine- et-Loire, Pays de la Loire	Scania truck assembly			1992		622	Scania Production Angers S.A.S. factory and assembly line, part of Scania AB	47°30′4″N 0°30′55″W
Ankara		Asia, Turkey	Ankara, Ankara Province	MAN Lion's City; MAN Lion's Intercity; MAN Lion's Coach Neoplan Cityliner; Neoplan Skyliner; Neoplan Tourliner			1985		3,539	MAN Truck & Bus plant. MAN Türkiye A.Ş. (MANAŞ)	
Anting (SAIC; Volkswagen)	2	Asia, China	Anting, Jiading; District, Shanghai	VW Lavida; VW Polo; VW Tiguan VW ID.3; VW ID.4 X VW ID.6 X Audi A7L; Audi Q5 e-tron Audi Q6	VW Santana Vista; VW Phideon VW Tiguan X VW T-Cross VW Passat Lingyu Škoda Fabia Škoda Octavia VW Touran	Engines; Battery systems	1985		17,294	SVW (SAIC Volkswagen Automobile Co., Ltd.) consists of a total area of 3.33 km^{2}, and includes a floor space of 0.9 km^{2}. One of the largest car-makers in China, it produces 500,000 units annually. There are 4 vehicle assembly plants, the newest of which is the New Energy Vehicle Plant, which builds EV's on VW's MEB platform. Audi A7L is built in Plant No. 3.	31°17′45″N 121°10′40″E
Anting-Jiading; Volkswagen; Transmission		Asia, China	Anting, Jiading; District, Shanghai			Transmissions including: MQ200 Manual Transmissions	2002	Closing in March 2023		Volkswagen Transmission (Shanghai) Co., Ltd. 60% owned by VW (China) Investment Co., Ltd., 20% owned by FAW Car, & 20% owned by SAIC Motor.	
Aurangabad; Shendra	A Škoda; Y Audi	Asia, India	Shendra, Aurangabad, Maharashtra	Audi A4 (B9); Audi A6 (C8); Audi Q5 (80A); Audi Q7 (4M) VW Tiguan (SWB) Škoda Kodiaq; Škoda Octavia (NX); Škoda Superb (B8)	Audi A3 (8V); Audi A4 (B7); Audi A4 (B8); Audi A6 (C6); Audi A6 (C7); Audi Q3 (8U); Audi Q5 (8R); Audi Q7 (4L) Škoda Octavia (1U); Škoda Octavia (1Z); Škoda Octavia (5E); Škoda Superb (B6); Škoda Yeti VW Jetta (1K); VW Jetta (1B); VW Passat (B6); VW Passat (B7); VW Passat (B8)	Engines	2001		864	Headquarters of Škoda Auto India and Audi India. All Audi brand vehicles made in India are manufactured here. 0.3 km^{2}.	19°52′23″N 75°29′18″E
Barcelona, Zona Franca; Press Shop		Europe, Spain	Zona Franca, Barcelona, Catalonia		pre-VAG SEAT cars including: SEAT 600; SEAT 800; SEAT 133; SEAT Panda; SEAT Marbella; SEAT 850; SEAT 127; SEAT Fura; SEAT 128; SEAT Ritmo; SEAT Ronda; SEAT 124; SEAT 1430; SEAT 131; SEAT 1400; SEAT 1500; SEAT 132; SEAT Trans/Terra; SEAT Ibiza Mk1; SEAT Málaga SEAT Toledo Mk1 VW Passat (B2); VW Santana	Stamped body parts, Components	1953	1998 (Vehicle production)	1,128 (Production: 1,516, Administrative areas: 108)	Former; SEAT, S.A. main factory and production line, now solely a press shop plant, also hosting SEAT's Training centre. Vehicle production moved to the newer Martorell plant. Oldest currently operating Volkswagen Group factory outside of Germany.	41°20′15.37″N 2°8′20.20″E
VW Bratislava	C Škoda; D	Europe, Slovakia	Devínska Nová Ves, Bratislava, Bratislava; Region	VW Touareg; Audi Q7; Audi Q8; Porsche Cayenne; Porsche Cayenne Coupe; VW Passat (B9); Škoda Superb (B9)	SEAT Ibiza (Mk3); SEAT Mii; Škoda Citigo; Škoda Octavia (Mk2); VW Polo Mk3; VW Polo Mk4; VW Golf Mk3 Variant; VW Golf Mk4 Variant; VW Golf Mk3; VW Golf Mk4; VW R32 MK4; VW Bora; VW Passat (B3); VW Passat (B5) Porsche Cayenne (9PA & 92A); VW up! Škoda Karoq bodyshells for completion in Leipzig, Germany	Manual Transmission assembly including MQ250, Stampings	1991; 1994 (Transmissions)		10,884	Originally, 80% owned by VW and 20% owned by BAZ and known as Volkswagen Bratislava, s.r.o. Became 100% owned by VW in 1995. Reorganized as Volkswagen Slovakia, a.s. in 1999. The only factory to produce the Golf Syncro four-wheel drive version. Headquarters, and part of Volkswagen Slovakia, a.s.	48°14′03″N 16°59′16″E
Braunschweig (Brunswick)		Europe, Germany	Braunschweig, Lower; Saxony			Axles, Steering units, Plastic parts, Vehicle components, Tools and machines, Battery systems	1938		6,372	Also produces components for non-VW Group companies	52°17′37″N 10°31′22″E
Audi Brussels	B	Europe, Belgium	Forest/Vorst, Brussels		SEAT León (1M); SEAT Toledo (1M) VW Beetle; VW Karmann Ghia (Type 14); VW Type 2 (T1); Porsche 356 VW Lupo; VW Golf Mk1; VW Golf Mk2; VW Golf Mk3; VW Golf Mk4; VW Golf Mk5; VW Passat (B1); VW Passat (B2); VW Passat (B3); VW Passat (B4); VW Polo Mk4 Audi A3 Sportback (8P); Audi A1 (8X); Audi e-tron/ Q8 e-tron Audi e-tron Sportback/ Q8 Sportback e-tron	Battery systems	1949	2025	3,076	Originally opened by D’Ieteren to build Studebakers. First built VW's in 1954 alongside Studebaker cars and trucks. 60 Packard Clippers were also built as Packard had merged with Studebaker in 1954. Studebaker production ended in 1965. VW bought 75% of the plant in January 1971. D’Ieteren Forest was renamed VW Brussels Forest (or Vorst). The plant was 100% owned by VW by 1975. The nearby Citroen plant in Forest was taken over by VW following its closure by PSA Peugeot Citroen in 1980 and added to the existing VW complex in 1982. Formerly scheduled to close, the plant was given a reprieve in 2007 when AUDI AG took over the plant from VW to build the first generation Audi A1. Now known as Audi Brussels S.A./N.V.	50°48′31″N 4°18′41″E
Chakan; Pune	G	Asia, India	Chakan, Pune District, Maharashtra	Škoda Kushaq; Škoda Slavia; VW Taigun; VW Virtus	Škoda Fabia (5J); Škoda Rapid; VW Ameo; VW Polo Mk5; VW Vento	Engines; serial production to start end of 2014; planned capacity of 360 engines per day	2009		3,743	Headquarters and plant of Volkswagen India, Škoda Auto India plant. Costing €580m, this is the largest German investment in India. A maximum annual capacity of 110,000 fully manufactured cars is anticipated.	
Changchun; FAW- Volkswagen	3	Asia, China	Changchun, Jilin; Province	VW Magotan; VW CC Audi A4L (B9); Audi A6L (C8); Audi Q5L (80A); Audi; Q5L Sportback	Audi 100 (C3); Audi 200 (C3); Audi A4 (B6); Audi A4 (B7); Audi A4L (B8); Audi A6 (C4); Audi A6 (C5); Audi A6L (C6); Audi A6L (C7); Audi Q3 (8U); Audi Q5 (8R); Audi e-tron VW Citi Golf (SEAT Córdoba); VW Golf Mk4; VW Bora HS; VW Golf Mk6; VW Golf Mk7; VW Caddy; VW Jetta (A2); VW Jetta King/Jetta Pioneer VW Bora Legend; VW C-Trek; VW CC (Gen 1); VW Sagitar; VW Tacqua	Engines including EA888, Gearboxes, Chassis components, Battery systems	1991		21,679 (Auto: 21,053; Platform: 626)	FAW-VW was established in 1991, with full operations commencing 1996. Now separated into two companies: FAW-Volkswagen Automotive Company Ltd. and Volkswagen FAW Platform Company Ltd., which makes axles & chassis components & is 60% owned by VW and 40% owned by FAW Car. There are 2 vehicle assembly plants. A new plant is being built for Audi FAW NEV Company Ltd., which will build Audi EV's on the PPE platform & is majority (60%) owned by Audi and by VW China. Production is due to begin in 2024.	43°50′34″N 125°11′48″E
Changsha (SAIC; Volkswagen)		Asia, China	Changsha, Hunan; Province	VW Lavida; VW Touran L	Škoda Kodiaq; Škoda Kodiaq GT		2015		2,799	SAIC Volkswagen Automobile Co., Ltd. Changsha Branch	
Chattanooga	C	North; America, United States	Chattanooga, Tennessee	VW Atlas; VW Atlas Cross Sport; VW ID.4	VW Passat (NMS)		2011		2,212	VW Group's 62nd plant, the Volkswagen Group of America plant is located on a 1,350 acres (550 ha) site and was inaugurated in May 2011, anticipating an annual capacity of 150,000 cars.	35°04′38″N 85°08′12″W
Chemnitz		Europe, Germany	Chemnitz, Saxony			Four cylinder piston engines (petrol and diesel), Vehicle components			2,046	Part of the Volkswagen Sachsen GmbH subsidiary	50°48′21″N 12°54′19″E
Chengdu; FAW- Volkswagen		Asia, China	Chengdu, Sichuan; Province	VW Sagitar Jetta VA3 Jetta VS5 Jetta VS7	VW Jetta (A2); VW Jetta King/Jetta Pioneer; VW New Jetta	Engines	2011		7,094	Began construction in May 2009. The 3rd car plant of FAW-Volkswagen Automotive Company Ltd. FAW-Volkswagen Chengdu Branch. Also includes Volkswagen FAW Platform Company Ltd., which makes axles & chassis components.	30°37′56″N 104°05′11″E
Córdoba		South; America, Argentina	Córdoba, Córdoba; Province	CKD assembly of Ducati motorcycles beginning with Scrambler Icon From 2024: VW Volksbus; VW Constellation; VW Delivery		Manual transaxles including MQ200, MQ250, & MQ281; Components	1996		1,341	Formerly known as Transax, a Ford subsidiary. Part of Autolatina venture between Ford and VW from 1987-1996. VW kept this plant when Autolatina dissolved. Part of Volkswagen Argentina S.A.	31°27′51.5″S 64°10′1″W
Bentley Crewe (Pyms Lane Site) Bentley	C	Europe, United Kingdom	Crewe, Cheshire, England	Bentleys: Bentayga; Flying Spur; Continental GT; Continental GTC	Bentleys: Arnage; Azure; Brooklands sedan Brooklands Coupé; Continental convertible Continental R Bentley Eight; Bentley Mulsanne (1980–1992); Bentley Mulsanne (2010-2020); Bentley Turbo R Rolls-Royce Silver Seraph; Rolls-Royce Corniche; Rolls-Royce; Silver Spirit/ Silver Spur/ Silver Dawn/ Flying Spur	Previously: W12 engines V8 engines	1938		3,670	Headquarters, R&D and plant of Bentley Motors Ltd. All production is carried out by hand using traditional 'craftsman' techniques.	53°06′16″N 2°28′26″W
Curitiba	4	South; America, Brazil	São José dos Pinhais, Paraná	VW T-Cross; Audi Q3 (F3); Audi Q3 Sportback	VW Fox; VW Golf; Audi A3; Audi Q3 (8U)	Axles	1999		2,238	Part of Volkswagen do Brasil	25°40′12″S 49°10′13″W
Dalian; Volkswagen; FAW Engine		Asia, China	Dalian, Liaoning; Province			Engines; Engine Components	2013		803	Volkswagen FAW Engine (Dalian) Co., Ltd. 60% owned by VW (China) Investment Co., Ltd., 40% owned by FAW Car.	
Dalian; Volkswagen; Automatic Transmission		Asia, China	Dalian, Liaoning; Province			DQ200 Dual-Clutch Transmissions, Camshafts for Audi Valvelift System (AVS) used on EA888 engine	2007		3,032	Volkswagen Automatic Transmission (Dalian) Co., Ltd. 100% owned by VW Group China.	
Dresden "Gläserne; Manufaktur"; Transparent; Factory	8	Europe, Germany	Dresden, Saxony		Bentley Continental Flying Spur; VW Phaeton; VW e-Golf; Volkswagen ID.3		2002	2025	406	Part of the Volkswagen Sachsen GmbH subsidiary. Majority of production is carried out by hand. Also includes individual customer specification changes.	51°02′40″N 13°45′21″E
Emden	E	Europe, Germany	Emden, Lower; Saxony	Volkswagen ID.4; Volkswagen ID.5; Volkswagen ID.7	VW Beetle; VW Type 3 VW Golf Mk1; VW Type 181; VW Type 2 (T2); VW Passat (B1); VW Passat (B2); VW Santana sedan (B2); VW Passat (B3); VW Passat (B4); VW Passat (B5); VW Passat (B6); VW Passat (B7); VW Passat (B8); Volkswagen CC; VW Arteon; Audi 80	Stampings	1964		8,834	Was the final German factory to produce the original Beetle before all production was shifted to the Puebla plant in Mexico. Is now the principal plant for the VW Passat. Has its own harbor which imports and re-distributes vehicles produced in overseas plants	53°20′49″N 7°9′38″E
Escobedo; International Motors	L Line 1 N Line 2	North; America, Mexico	General Escobedo, Nuevo León	International HV; International HX; International LoneStar; International LT; International MV; International RH	Ford F-650/F-750 (2000-2015); Ford LCF; International CF/CityStar; International DuraStar; International PayStar; International ProStar; International TranStar; International WorkStar; International 9000	Subassemblies, Components	1998			International Motors plant. Formerly part of the Blue Diamond Truck Company joint venture with Ford Motor Co.	
Foshan; FAW- Volkswagen		Asia, China	Foshan, Guangdong; Province	VW Golf Mk8; VW T-Roc VW ID.4 Crozz VW ID.6 Crozz Audi Q2L; Audi Q2L e-tron Audi Q4 e-tron	Audi A3 Sedan & Sportback (8V) VW Golf Mk7; VW e-Golf	Battery systems	2013		5,554	Began construction in 2011. The 4th car plant of FAW-Volkswagen Automotive Company Ltd. FAW-Volkswagen Foshan Branch. Also includes Volkswagen FAW Platform Company Ltd., which makes axles & chassis components.	
Győr	1	Europe, Hungary	Győr, Győr-Moson-Sopron	Audi TT (8S) Coupé; Audi TT (8S) Roadster; Audi TTS (8S); C & R Audi TT RS (8S) C & R Audi Q3 Mk2; Audi Q3 Sportback; Cupra Terramar	Audi A3/S3 (8L); Audi A3 Cabriolet (8P); Audi RS3 Sportback (8P); Audi A3 Cabriolet (8V); Audi A3/S3 Sedan (8V) 2015-2019; Audi RS3 Sedan (8V) 2017-2018; Audi TT (8N) C & R Audi TT (8J) C & R Audi TTS (8J); C & R Audi TT RS (8J); C & R	Aluminum body panels for the Audi R8, Petrol engines, Diesel engines, Electric Motors for EV's, Toolmaking	1997		12,226	Part of Audi Hungaria Motor Kft., owned by Audi AG	47°41′56″N 17°41′5″E
Hanover	H	Europe, Germany	Hanover, Lower; Saxony	VW Transporter (T6); VW Multivan (T7); VW ID. Buzz	VW Beetle; VW Type 181; VW Taro; VW Type 2 (T1); VW Type 2 (T2); VW Type 2 (T3); VW Transporter (T4); VW Transporter (T5); VW LT; VW LT (LT2); VW e-Crafter; MAN-VW G series truck VW Amarok	Engines, Foundry, Toolmaking, Components, Porsche Panamera (970) bodyshells for completion in Leipzig, Germany	1956		13,132	Volkswagen Commercial Vehicles (VWN) site. Engine production was moved to Salzgitter in 1972.	52°25′6″N 9°40′19″E
Hefei (Volkswagen Anhui)		Asia, China	Hefei, Anhui	Cupra Tavascan; VW ID. Unyx 06; VW ID. Unyx 07		Battery systems	2023		2,100	Joint venture with JAC Motors for the production of electric vehicles of the MEB Platform. A R&D center is currently in development	31°42′23″N 117°13′52″E
Heilbronn	7	Europe, Germany	Heilbronn, Baden- Württemberg	Audi R8 (Type 4S); Audi e-tron GT	Audi R8 (Type 42)		2014		150	Located in the Böllinger Höfe industrial park in Heilbronn, around six kilometers (4 miles) away from the Neckarsulm plant.	
Huntsville; International Motors		North; America, United States	Huntsville, Alabama			Big-Bore Diesel Engines	2008			International Motors plant. Formerly Navistar Big Bore Diesel of Alabama, LLC.	
Ingolstadt	A	Europe, Germany	Ingolstadt, Bavaria	Audi A3 (8Y); Audi S3 (8Y); Audi RS3 (8Y); Audi A4; Audi S4 (B9); Audi RS4 (B9); Audi A4 Allroad; Audi A5 Coupe & Sportback; Audi S5 Coupe & Sportback; Audi RS5 Coupe & Sportback; Audi Q2	DKW Junior; DKW F102; Audi F103; VW Beetle; VW Iltis (Type 183); Audi Coupé; Audi Quattro; Audi Cabriolet; Audi 80/80q/90/90q Audi 4000; Audi 100/200/5000; Audi A3/S3 (8L); Audi A3/S3 (8P); Audi A3/S3 Sportback (8V); Audi A3/S3 Sedan (8V) (2019-2020); Audi RS3 Sportback (8V); Audi RS3 Sedan (8V) 2019-2020; Audi S4 (B5); Audi S4 (B6); Audi S4 (B7); Audi S4 (B8); Audi RS4 (B8); Audi Q5 (8R)	Bodyshell construction and painting of Audi TT Mk1 & Mk2 (C & R) and A3 Cabrio	1959		41,719	The larger of Audi's two principal assembly plants (the other being Neckarsulm). Volkswagen acquired the near-new plant at Ingolstadt when Auto Union was purchased from Daimler-Benz in stages from 1964-1966. Now headquarters of AUDI AG and the Audi Group (which primarily consists of Audi and Lamborghini)	48°47′16″N 11°24′50″E
Jiading; Shanghai		Asia, China	Jiading, Shanghai			Gearboxes	????			Volkswagen Transmission (Shanghai) Co. Ltd.	31°17′20″N 121°10′54″E
Johannesburg		Africa, South Africa	Johannesburg, Gauteng	Scania trucks & buses					666	Scania South Africa (Pty) Ltd.	
Kassel		Europe, Germany	Baunatal, Kassel, Hesse			Foundry, Press shop, Remanufactured engines, Direct-Shift Gearboxes, Remanufactured transmissions, Exhaust systems, catalytic converters, diesel particulate filters	1958		13,253	The plant suffered damage from a magnesium fire in May 2006. It also mounts the 7-speed DSG to 4-cylinder engines. Also includes the Volkswagen AG Original Teile Centre (OTC), (Volkswagen Group Original Parts Centre) supplying 330,000 genuine parts.	51°15′28″N 9°26′0″E 51°14′46″N 9°26′23″E
Kigali		Africa, Rwanda	Kigali	VW Polo VW Passat VW Tiguan; VW Teramont VW Amarok			2018				
Kraków		Europe, Poland	Niepolomice, Lesser Poland Voivodeship	MAN TGS; MAN TGX			2007		1,700	MAN Truck & Bus plant. MAN Trucks Sp. z o.o.	
Kuala Lumpur		Asia, Malaysia	Port Klang	Scania trucks & buses			1995		258	Scania Regional Product Center (CKD). Scania (Malaysia) Sdn. Bhd.	
Kulim		Asia, Malaysia	Kulim, Kedah	Porsche Cayenne			2022			Sime Darby factory in Malaysia. First facility assembling Porsches outside Europe. Assembled from CKD kits under license from Porsche.	
Kvasiny	T 5; 6 9	Europe, Czech Republic	Kvasiny, Hradec; Králové	Škoda Kodiaq; Škoda Karoq; SEAT Ateca; Cupra Ateca	Škoda Superb; Škoda Roomster; Škoda Praktik; Škoda Yeti Škoda_Superb (1947–1949); Škoda Felicia (1959–1964); Škoda 110 R Škoda Pickup; VW Caddy (9U)		1934		6,890	Škoda Auto a.s. factory. Purchased by Škoda Auto in 1947.	50°12′17″N 16°15′28″E
Lagos		Africa, Nigeria	Ojo, Lagos; State		VW Jetta; VW Passat; VW CC; VW Amarok		2015			Former VW Nigeria plant was bought by Stallion Group, which is using it for local assembly of various auto brands including VW, Nissan, & Hyundai.	6°27′43″N 3°12′56″E
Leipzig; Porsche	L	Europe, Germany	Leipzig, Saxony	Porsche Panamera; Porsche Macan	Porsche Carrera GT; Porsche Cayenne		2001		4,194	Final assembly of the Cayenne (9PA & 92A) (from Bratislava) & Panamera (970) (from Hanover)	
Loutang (SAIC; Volkswagen)		Asia, China	Loutang, Jiading Industrial Zone, Jiading; District, Shanghai			Engines including EA211	2005		2,300	SAIC Volkswagen Powertrain Co. Ltd. 60% owned by VW (China) Investment Co., Ltd. & 20& owned by SAIC Motor.	
Luleå		Europe, Sweden	Luleå Municipality, Norrbotten, Norrbotten County			Scania truck frame members, Rear axle housings	1968		499	Ferruform AB factory, part of Scania AB	65°36′48″N 22°7′45″E
Manaus; Ducati		South America, Brazil	Manaus, Amazonas	Ducati Motorcycles			2012			Dafra plant. Ducati motorcycles assembled from CKD by Dafra Motos.	
Martin		Europe, Slovakia	Martin, Žilina			Synchronous rings, Flanged shafts, Brake drums, Differential housing, Brake discs	2000		859	Part of Volkswagen Slovakia, a.s.	
Martorell	R	Europe, Spain	Martorell, Catalonia	SEAT León SEAT Ibiza Mk5 SEAT Arona Cupra Formentor; Cupra León; Audi A1 Mk2 Cupra Raval	Audi Q3 Mk1; SEAT Altea; SEAT Exeo; SEAT Arosa; SEAT Ibiza Mk2; SEAT Ibiza Mk3; SEAT Ibiza Mk4; SEAT Córdoba; SEAT Inca; SEAT Toledo Mk1; SEAT Toledo Mk2; SEAT Toledo Mk3; VW Caddy (9K); VW Polo Classic (6K); VW Polo Variant (6K)	Engine assembly	1993		12,607 (Production: 6,713, Spare parts: 306, Administrative areas: 2,386)	Headquarters, Technical Centre, R&D Centre, Design Center, Prototypes Centre of Development and main factory of SEAT, S.A. with annual capacity of 500,000 cars, SEAT Sport division Centre, as well as Volkswagen Group Genuine Parts Centre. Construction of SEAT's Technical Centre began in 1973, and was completed in 1975. Construction of SEAT's factory began in 1989, inaugurated by the King of Spain in 1993; in 1998 the plant received the Best factory of the VW Group in the first quarter award	41°29′48″N 1°54′9″E
Meppel		Europe, Netherlands	Meppel, Drenthe			Scania truck components and paint shop	1964		401	Scania Production Meppel B.V. factory, part of Scania AB	52°41′25″N 6°10′24″E
Mladá; Boleslav	N 0; 1 2; 3 4	Europe, Czech Republic	Mladá; Boleslav, Central; Bohemia	Škoda Fabia; Škoda Octavia Škoda Karoq Škoda Kamiq Škoda Scala Škoda Enyaq	Škoda Favorit; Škoda Felicia Škoda Rapid; SEAT Toledo	Engines, Gearboxes (MQ/SQ 100, MQ200), Axles, Foundry, EV & PHEV Battery Packs	1905		27,723	Main factory, R&D and headquarters of Škoda Auto a.s., and home to Škoda Auto Museum. Site started original manufacturing of cars in 1905 as part of Laurin & Klement. Taken over by Škoda Works in 1925 and re-branded as Škoda Auto. Transferred into VW Group ownership in April 1991.	50°25′16″N 14°55′50″E
Molsheim Bugatti	M	Europe, France	Dorlisheim, Molsheim, Bas-Rhin, Alsace	Bugatti Chiron Bugatti Centodieci Bugatti Mistral	Bugatti Veyron; Bugatti Divo				93	Headquarters, research and development facility and plant of Bugatti Automobiles S.A.S. All production is carried out by hand using traditional 'craftsman' techniques. Bugatti Automobiles S.A.S. is, as of Nov. 2021, 100% owned by Bugatti Rimac, which is in turn owned 45% by Porsche AG and 55% by Rimac Group.	48°31′38″N 7°29′46″E
Münchsmünster		Europe, Germany	Münchsmünster, Bavaria			Structural components - Diecast aluminum components, Chassis modules (Brake discs, wheel hubs, wheel carriers, swivel bearings), Press shop (Stampings)	2013			Associated with Audi's nearby Ingolstadt plant. In addition to Audi, also supplies components to VW, Bentley, and Lamborghini.	
Munich		Europe, Germany	Munich, Bavaria	MAN TGS; MAN TGX	MAN F90; MAN F2000; MAN buses	Axles, driveshafts, transfer cases, Truck cabs, Body components	1955		9,078	MAN Truck & Bus HQ & main plant. Logistics center.	
Nanjing (SAIC; Volkswagen)		Asia, China	Nanjing, Jiangsu; Province	VW Passat	VW Passat NMS VW Santana Vista Škoda Kamiq/Kamiq GT Škoda Superb		2008		2,886	SAIC Volkswagen Automobile Co., Ltd. Nanjing Branch	
Narasapura		Asia, India	Narasapura Industrial Area, Kolar District, Karnataka	Scania trucks Scania bus chassis	Scania bus bodies		2013		203	Scania AB plant. Scania Commercial Vehicles India Pvt. Ltd.	
Neckarsulm	N	Europe, Germany	Neckarsulm, Baden- Württemberg	Audi A4 (B9) sedan Audi A5 Cabriolet; Audi S5 Cabriolet; Audi A6; Audi S6; Audi RS6 (C8); Audi A6 allroad Audi A7; Audi S7; Audi RS 7 Audi A8; Audi S8	Audi Cabriolet; Audi 100; Audi 200; Audi 5000; Audi V8; Audi S4 (C4); Audi S6 Plus; Audi A4 (B8) sedan Audi RS4 (B5); Audi RS4 (B7); Audi RS5 Cabriolet; Audi A2; Audi RS6 (C5); Audi RS6 (C6); Audi RS6 (C7); Audi R8; Audi 50; NSU Prinz; NSU Spider; NSU Typ 110/1200; NSU Ro 80; Porsche 924; Porsche 944	Aluminium body shells and panels, Engine development, Paint finish on Lamborghini; Gallardo; Chassis for Lamborghini Gallardo; Chassis for Lamborghini Huracan			15,900	The former NSU Motorenwerke AG site, acquired by VW in 1969. Now, AUDI AG, and the "Audi aluminium plant". Also home to Audi high performance private subsidiary Audi Sport GmbH, who manufacture all Audi RS cars (except the TTRS) and the Audi R8	49°12′5″N 9°13′19″E
Ningbo (SAIC; Volkswagen)		Asia, China	Ningbo, Zhejiang Province	VW Lamando L VW Tharu VW Teramont; VW Teramont X VW Viloran Audi Q6	Škoda Karoq Škoda Octavia		2013		3,358	SAIC Volkswagen Automobile Co., Ltd. Ningbo Branch	
Nuremberg		Europe, Germany	Nuremberg, Bavaria		MAN trucks	Engines	1901		3,789	MAN Truck & Bus plant. Truck production moved to Munich in 1955.	
Olifantsfontein		Africa, South Africa	Olifantsfontein, Gauteng	MAN Lion's City; MAN Lion's Intercity; MAN Lion's Explorer bus bodies for MAN bus chassis & VW Volksbus chassis			2000		160	MAN Truck & Bus plant. MAN Bus & Coach (Pty) Ltd.	
Oskarshamn		Europe, Sweden	Oskarshamn Municipality, Kalmar County, Småland			Scania truck Cab production	1946		2,172	Scania AB factory	57°15′24″N 16°25′42″E
Osnabrück	K	Europe, Germany	Osnabrück, Lower; Saxony	VW T-Roc Cabriolet VW Arteon Shooting Brake	VW Golf Cabriolet; VW XL1; VW Tiguan; VW Tiguan Limited MOIA +6 Škoda Karoq Porsche Boxster/Cayman; Porsche Cayenne		1901		2,421	Former site of Wilhelm Karmann GmbH, producing cars and components for Volkswagen Group	52°15′57″N 8°4′40″E
Pacheco	A	South; America, Argentina	General Pacheco, Buenos Aires Province	VW Amarok VW Taos	VW Caddy; VW Gol; VW Polo Classic; VW Suran; SEAT Cordoba; SEAT Inca Under Ford: Ford F-Series light duty truck Ford F-Series (medium duty truck)	Engine assembly, Components	1995		3,679	Formerly Ford's Pacheco Truck Assembly and Painting Plant. Part of Autolatina venture with Ford from 1987-1996. VW kept this side of the Pacheco plant when Autolatina dissolved and converted it to car production. Part of Volkswagen Argentina S.A.	34°26′33″S 58°41′32″W
Palmela; AutoEuropa	V	Europe, Portugal	Quinta do Anjo, Palmela, Setúbal	VW T-Roc	Ford Galaxy SEAT Alhambra; VW Sharan; VW Eos; VW Scirocco Mk3		1995		5,282	Volkswagen Autoeuropa, Lda. Originally a 50/50 joint venture with Ford. VW bought out Ford in 1999, making Autoeuropa 100% owned by VW.	38°35′2″N 8°59′19″W
Pamplona	Y	Europe, Spain	Pamplona, Navarra	VW T-Cross; VW Taigo VW ID.Polo VW ID.Cross Škoda Epiq	various Authi cars: Morris 1100; MG 1100; Morris 1300; MG 1300; Mini; Austin 1100; Austin 1300; MG-S 1300; Austin Victoria; Austin de Luxe SEAT 124; SEAT Panda; Lancia Beta Coupé & HPE; VW Polo; VW Polo Classic	Engine assembly	1966		4,951	Authi plant bought by SEAT in 1974. First SEAT built on January 22, 1976. Briefly assembled Lancias from 1978-1979. Previously called Landaben when owned by SEAT, S.A. In December 1993, was renamed Fabrica Navarra de Automoviles S.A. and separated from SEAT. Ownership was transferred to Volkswagen Passenger Cars. In December 1994, renamed Volkswagen Navarra, S.A. In 1986 the facility was awarded with the World quality award (Q-86).	42°48′33″N 1°41′44″W
Borgo Panigale; Ducati	B	Europe, Italy	Borgo Panigale, Bologna, Emilia-Romagna	Ducati Motorcycles		Ducati motorcycle engines			1,454	Ducati Motor Holding S.p.A. headquarters, research & development, and main plant.	
Pekan		Asia, Malaysia	Pekan, Pahang	VW Arteon; VW Golf Mk8; VW Tiguan Allspace	VW Jetta; VW Passat (B7); VW Passat (B8); VW Polo hatchback VW Polo Sedan/Vento		2012			HICOM Automotive Manufacturers (Malaysia) factory. Assembled from CKD kits under license from VW.	
Pinetown		Africa, South Africa	Pinetown, KwaZulu-Natal	MAN TGS; MAN TGL; MAN TGM; MAN bus chassis VW Constellation; VW Volksbus			1962		125	MAN Truck & Bus plant. MAN Automotive (South Africa) (Pty) Ltd.	
Polkowice		Europe, Poland	Polkowice, Lower Silesian Voivodeship			Diesel engines (EA288 1.6L & 2.0L 4-cyl.), Engine components	1999		1,282	Volkswagen Motor Polska Sp. z o. o.	
Poznań	X	Europe, Poland	Antoninek, Poznań, Greater; Poland	VW Caddy Mk4; VW Transporter (T6); Ford Tourneo Connect	VW Caddy Mk2; VW Caddy Mk3; VW Transporter (T4); VW Transporter (T5); VW LT (LT2) VW Bora; VW Passat (B5); VW Polo Mk3; Audi A6 (C5); SEAT Córdoba (Mk1); SEAT Inca; Škoda Favorit; Škoda Felicia; Škoda Fabia (Mk1); Škoda Octavia (Mk1)	Intake pipe modules, Cylinder heads, Steering gear housings, Foundry (in (Wilda)	1993		5,531	Initially a joint venture between VW Group and Tarpan, fully owned by VW Group since 1996. Volkswagen Commercial Vehicles (VWN) site. Volkswagen Poznań Sp. z o.o. There is also a Special Vehicle Body plant in nearby Swarzedz.	52°24′40″N 17°01′53″E
El Prat de Llobregat, Gearbox		Europe, Spain	El Prat de Llobregat, Baix Llobregat, Barcelona (province), Catalonia			Gearboxes including MQ281 and previously MQ200, Foundry, Casting, Transmission components	1980		1,022	SEAT Gearbox del Prat, S.A. transmission production site, fully owned by SEAT, S.A., producing gearboxes for SEAT, VW, Audi and Škoda; in 2009 the facility received the Volkswagen Excellence Award for the high-quality production process and product	41°19′9″N 2°7′27″E
Puebla	M	North; America, Mexico	Puebla, Puebla; State	VW Jetta Mk7 VW Tiguan (LWB version only); VW Taos	VW Beetle; VW Derby; VW Caribe; VW Golf Mk2; VW Golf Mk3; VW Cabrio (1996-2002); VW Golf Mk4; VW Golf Mk5-Mk6 Variant (Jetta Sportwagen); VW Golf Mk7; VW Golf Mk7 Sportwagen/Variant/ Alltrack; VW Atlantic; VW Jetta Mk2; VW Jetta Mk3; VW Jetta Mk4; VW City Jetta/Clasico; VW Jetta Mk5; VW Jetta Mk6; VW Corsar; VW Brasilia; VW T2 van VW Safari/Thing (Type 181); VW Hormiga	Previously: EA855 Inline five petrol engines	1967		13,535	Largest Volkswagen factory outside of Germany. Headquarters of Volkswagen de Mexico S.A. de C.V. (VWM)	19°07′19″N 98°15′10″W
Purwakarta	J	Asia, Indonesia	Purwakarta Regency, West Java	VW Tiguan Allspace			2019			PT National Assemblers factory owned by Indomobil Group of Indonesia.	
Qingdao; FAW- Volkswagen		Asia, China	Qingdao, Shandong; Province	VW Bora (MQB-based) Audi A3L Sedan & A3 Sportback (8Y)			2018		3,289	Began construction in 2015. The 5th car plant of FAW-Volkswagen Automotive Company Ltd. FAW-Volkswagen Qingdao Branch.	
Querétaro City		North; America, Mexico	Querétaro City, Querétaro; State	VW Constellation; Volkswagen Delivery VW Volksbus			2004		652	VW Truck & Bus factory. Volkswagen Truck & Bus México SA de CV.	
Quito		South; America, Ecuador	Quito, Pichincha Province	VW Amarok			2017			Aymesa plant. Assembles vehicles for VW as well as Hyundai, Kia, & JAC under contract.	
Rayong; Ducati	T	Asia, Thailand	Pluak Daeng, Rayong Province	Ducati Motorcycles					172	Ducati Motor (Thailand) Co., Ltd.	
Resende	F R	South; America, Brazil	Resende, Rio de Janeiro	VW Volksbus; VW Constellation; VW Delivery; VW Meteor	VW L80; VW Worker; MAN TGX				1,085	Volkswagen Caminhões e Ônibus, formerly MAN Latin America, part of MAN SE from 2009 to 2021. Since August 2021, a direct subsidiary of Traton SE. Name changed to VW Truck & Bus in May 2022.	22°25′37″S 44°21′22″W
Salzgitter (VW plant)	S	Europe, Germany	Salzgitter, Lower Saxony		VW K70; VW 412; VW Passat (B1)	Automotive engines for Bentley, Bugatti and all mainstream marques Volkswagen Marine diesel engines VW Industrial engines Components	1970		6,356	S code became obsolete in 1975 when Salzgitter was converted to an engine and components, plant.	52°11′9″N 10°26′32″E
Salzgitter (Watenstedt) (MAN plant)		Europe, Germany	Watenstedt, Salzgitter, Lower Saxony		MAN trucks & buses MAN-VW G series truck Büssing trucks & buses	Components including Axles (non-driven) for MAN & Scania; Crankshafts	1964		2,652	MAN Truck & Bus plant. Originally, a Büssing plant. Taken over by MAN in 1972. Truck production phased out in 2016. Complete bus production phased out in 2008. Bus chassis production phased out in 2018. Supplies CKD kits. Logistics & spare parts.	
San Antonio; International Motors	S	North; America, United States	San Antonio, Texas	Class 6-8 trucks International MV/eMV			2022			International Motors plant. New engineering center about 8 miles away from the plant includes advanced engineering, purchasing, truck validation, & truck customization operations.	
San Jose Chiapa	2	North; America, Mexico	San José Chiapa, Puebla; State	Audi Q5; Audi Q5 Sportback			2017		5,241	First Audi factory in North America. Audi México, S.A. de C.V.	
Sant'Agata Bolognese Lamborghini	L	Europe, Italy	Sant'Agata Bolognese, Bologna, Emilia-Romagna	Lamborghini Huracan; Lamborghini Revuelto; Lamborghini Countach LPI 800-4; Lamborghini Urus	Lamborghini Gallardo; Lamborghini Countach; Lamborghini Diablo; Lamborghini Murciélago; Lamborghini Reventón; Lamborghini Veneno; Lamborghini Centenario; Lamborghini Sian; Lamborghini Aventador; Lamborghini LM002	V12 engines			1,779	Headquarters and plant of Automobili Lamborghini S.p.A., also location of the company's main research and development department, part of the Audi Group.	44°39′31″N 11°07′32″E
São; Carlos		South; America, Brazil	São Carlos, São Paulo			Engines: EA211; 1.0 MPI & TSI/ 1.4 TSI/1.6 MPI I3 & I4 engines 1.6L EA111 I4; AT-1000 8V/16V/16V Turbo 1.0L I4; 1.9L diesel I4; Engine components	1996		873	Part of Volkswagen do Brasil	22°03′51″S 47°52′19″W
São; Paulo		South; America, Brazil	Sao Bernardo do Campo, Greater São Paulo, São Paulo state	Scania trucks Scania bus chassis		Engines, Gearboxes, Axles	1962		4,113	Scania Latin America Ltda., part of Scania AB	23°42′49″S 46°33′58″W
Sarajevo	T (to 1994); 9 (from 2002); S (BIH)	Europe, Bosnia and Herzegovina	Vogošća, Sarajevo Canton		TAS: VW Beetle; VW Golf Mk1; VW Golf Mk2; VW Jetta Mk1; VW Jetta Mk2; VW Caddy Mk1 VW Sarajevo: VW Polo Mk4; VW Golf Mk4; VW Golf Mk5; VW Passat (B6); Škoda Felicia; Škoda Fabia Mk1; Škoda Octavia Mk1/Octavia Tour; Škoda Octavia Mk2; Škoda Superb Mk1; Audi A3 Mk2; Audi A4 (B7); Audi A6 (C6); EcoCarrier	Ring gears Stub axles Wheel Hubs; Wheel Flanges containers Parts for Polo, Škoda Superb, Golf 5-6-7, Audi Q7, Touareg, Porsche Cayenne ... Platform MQB, PQXX ..	1972		94	Previously a joint venture with NSU called Pretis, which assembled the NSU Prinz from 1965-1969. Originally known as TAS (Tvornica Automobila Sarajevo). Was originally 49% owned by VW and 51% owned by UNIS, VW's Yugoslavian importer. Began to produce production parts and replacement parts in 1972. Began to assemble vehicles in 1973. T & 9 codes used when Sarajevo was in former country of Yugoslavia. Production halted in 1992 due to the Bosnian war and collapse of Yugoslavia. TAS went bankrupt in 1995. Factory bombed during the Bosnian War, subsequently rebuilt in 1998, additional S code assigned for Volkswagen Sarajevo d.o.o. in the new country of Bosnia and Herzegovina. All are SKDs. New company established in 1998 as Volkswagen Sarajevo d.o.o., which was now 58% owned by VW & 42% owned by UNIS. In 2001, Bosnia's privatization agency sold the 42% stake in VW Sarajevo to Prevent BH, the Bosnian unit of the Prevent Group. Vehicle production for VW ended in 2008. The EcoCarrier, a small electric truck, was produced on behalf of EcoCraft Automotive, a German company, from 2009-2011, when EcoCraft went bankrupt. EcoCraft was liquidated in 2012. Only components are now produced for VW. 58% owned by VW & 42% owned by Prevent Group.	43°54′00″N 18°21′43″E
Silao		North; America, Mexico	Silao, Guanajuato; State			EA211 1.5 liter EA888 Gen3; 2.0 liter Four cylinder engines	2013		1,335	VW de México, S.A. de C.V. - Silao plant	
Silverton		Africa, South Africa	Silverton, Pretoria, Gauteng	VW Amarok Mk2 Ford Ranger; Ford Everest			1961			Ford plant. Building VW Amarok under cooperation agreement between Ford and VW.	
Słupsk		Europe, Poland	Słupsk, Pomeranian; Voivodeship	Scania bus body assembly			1993		758	Scania Production Slupsk S.A. factory and assembly line, part of Scania AB	54°28′42″N 17°0′46″E
Södertälje	1 Scania; 2 Scania	Europe, Sweden	Södertälje Municipality, Södermanland, Stockholm County	Scania trucks Scania bus chassis		Engines, Gearboxes, Components			16,466	Scania AB headquarters, R&D and main production plant	59°10′14″N 17°38′26″E
Solomonovo	B Škoda; Z SKD Audis, VWs & SEATs	Europe, Ukraine	Solomonovo, Zakarpattia Oblast	Škoda Fabia (NJ); Škoda Superb; Škoda Karoq; Škoda Kodiaq	Audi A4; Audi A6; SEAT Altea; SEAT Toledo; Škoda Fabia Mk1; Škoda Fabia Mk2; Škoda Rapid; Škoda Octavia Mk1/Octavia Tour; Škoda Octavia Mk2; Škoda Octavia Mk3; Škoda Superb Mk1; Škoda Superb Mk2; Škoda Roomster; Škoda Yeti; VW Golf Plus; VW Bora; VW Passat		December 2001			Eurocar factory, a contract manufacturer for VW Group in Ukraine, used to also produce Semi Knock Down (SKD) Audis, VWs & SEATs under the Z code.	48°26′13″N 22°10′31.5″E
Springfield; International Motors	H	North; America, United States	Springfield, Ohio	International CV; International HV; International MV; Chevrolet Silverado Medium Duty; Chevrolet Express cutaway GMC Savana cutaway	International DuraStar; International ProStar; International TerraStar; International TranStar; International WorkStar; IC Bus AC-Series		1961		1,450	International Motors plant. Also does contract assembly work for GM.	
St Petersburg		Europe, Russia	Shushary, St Petersburg, Northwestern Federal District	Scania bus body assembly Scania trucks MAN TGS WW			2016		108	Truck Production RUS LLC factory and assembly line, a 50/50 joint venture between Scania AB & MAN Truck & Bus SE	
Starachowice		Europe, Poland	Starachowice, Świętokrzyskie Voivodeship	MAN Lion's City; MAN bus chassis	Star trucks		1947		3,090	MAN Truck & Bus plant (MAN Bus Sp. z o.o.). Originally, an FSC Star plant. Taken over by MAN in 1999. Truck production phased out in 2007.	
Stupava		Europe, Slovakia	Stupava, Bratislava; Region			Tools, instruments, equipment for production	2014			Part of Volkswagen Slovakia, a.s.	
Taipei		Asia, Taiwan	Taoyuan	Scania trucks & buses			1996		47	Scania Regional Product Center (CKD).	
Taubaté	T	South; America, Brazil	Taubaté, São Paulo	VW Polo VW Tera	VW Up VW Parati VW Gol; VW Voyage VW Passat (B1)		1975		2,487	Part of Volkswagen do Brasil	23°3′14″S 45°38′9″W
Thika		Africa, Kenya	Thika	VW Polo Vivo; VW Tiguan; VW Caddy Kombi	VW Beetle VW Golf VW Jetta VW Santana (B2) VW Transporter		1974 (possibly earlier for Beetle) 2016 (restarted)	1980s or 1990s before restarting in 2016		Kenya Vehicle Manufacturers (KVM) plant. Originally Leyland Kenya Ltd. plant, partially owned by British Leyland. In addition to British vehicles, also built vehicles for VW and Suzuki. CMC Holdings Ltd. (ex-Cooper Motor Corporation) first invested in the plant in 1974. Name changed to KVM in 1989.	
Tianjin; FAW- Volkswagen		Asia, China	Tianjin	VW Bora (MQB-based); VW Tayron; VW Tayron X VW Talagon; VW Tavendor Audi Q3 (F3); Audi Q3 Sportback (F3)			2018		3,662	Began construction in 2016. The 6th car plant of FAW-Volkswagen Automotive Company Ltd. FAW-Volkswagen Tianjin Branch. Also includes Volkswagen FAW Platform Company Ltd., which makes axles & chassis components.	
Tianjin; Volkswagen; Automatic Transmission		Asia, China	Tianjin			DQ381, DQ500, DQ501; Dual-Clutch Transmissions, DQ400e; Dual-Clutch Transmission for PHEV's, DL382; Dual-Clutch Transmissions, APP290, APP310 electric motor/gearbox	2014		4,674	Volkswagen Automatic Transmission (Tianjin) Co., Ltd. 100% owned by VW Group China. Also does development & testing of transmissions, e-drives, & batteries.	
Tucumán		South; America, Argentina	San Miguel de Tucumán, Tucumán Province			Rear axle gears	1976		1,008	Scania Argentina S.A. factory, part of Scania AB	26°52′47.5″S 65°7′38″W
Tulsa; International Motors	B	North; America, United States	Tulsa, Oklahoma	IC Bus CE; IC Bus RE; IC Bus TC-series bus chassis	IC Bus AE-Series		2000			International Motors - IC Bus plant.	
Kariega (Former Uitenhage)	U	Africa, South Africa	Kariega, Eastern; Cape	VW Polo/Polo GTI VW Polo Vivo (Mk5 Polo-based)/Polo Vivo Maxx	VW Beetle; VW Type 3 (1500 Sedan & Variant/ 1600TL Fastback); VW 411/412; VW Caddy; VW Citi Golf; VW Fox; VW Golf Mk1; VW Golf Mk2; VW Golf Mk3; VW Golf Mk4; VW Golf Mk4 Variant; VW Golf Mk5; VW Jetta (A2); VW Jetta (A3); VW Jetta (A4); VW Jetta (A5); VW Passat (B1); VW Passat (B2); VW Polo Classic; VW Polo Playa; VW Polo Mk4; VW Polo Mk5 5-door/CrossPolo; VW Polo Vivo (Mk4 Polo-based); VW Type 2 (T1); VW Type 2 (T2); VW Microbus (T3); Audi Super 90; Audi 80; Audi A4 (B5); Audi 100 (C1); Audi 100 (C2); Audi 500 (C3); Audi 500 (C4); Audi S4 (C4); Audi A6 (C4/C5)	Engines, Components	1951		3,679	Originally known as South Africa Motor Assemblers and Distributors (SAMAD). VW acquired a blocking minority in SAMAD in 1956. Press shop and engine production begins in 1965. In 1966, SAMAD was renamed Volkswagen of South Africa Ltd., which was 63% owned by VW. In 1974, VW bought all remaining shares of VW of South Africa, making it a wholly owned subsidiary, Volkswagen of South Africa (Pty.) Ltd. Primarily supplies countries which use right-hand drive	33°47′10″S 25°24′59″E
Ürümqi (SAIC; Volkswagen)	???	Asia, China	Urumqi; Toutunhe District, Xinjiang Uygur Autonomous Region,	VW Santana VW Tharu			2013		539	SAIC Volkswagen (Xinjiang) Automotive Co., Ltd., start CKD production in mid of 2013	43°49′52″N 87°26′28″E
Vrchlabí	B 7; 8	Europe, Czech Republic	Vrchlabí, Hradec; Králové		Škoda Favorit; Škoda Felicia; Škoda Fabia (6Y); Škoda Octavia (1U); Škoda Octavia (1U) Tour; Škoda_Octavia (1Z); Škoda Roomster; Škoda Superb (3U)	Dual-clutch transmissions for VW Group (DQ200)	1864		824	Škoda Auto a.s. factory. Originally founded by Petera & Sons. Started building auto bodies in 1908. Integrated into Škoda Auto in 1946. Used to carry out individual customer modifications, along with RS models. Converted into a transmission plant in 2012.	50°36′39.5″N 15°37′28″E
Wolfsburg	W	Europe, Germany	Wolfsburg, Lower; Saxony	VW Golf Mk8; VW Golf Variant/ Alltrack Mk8; VW Touran; VW Tiguan; VW Tayron	VW Beetle; VW Iltis (Type 183); VW Type 181; VW Karmann Ghia; VW Lupo; VW Type 2 (T1); VW Type 3 VW 411/412; VW Polo; VW Derby; VW Golf Mk1; VW Golf Mk2; VW Golf Mk3; VW Golf Mk4; VW Golf Mk5; VW Golf Mk6; VW Golf Mk7; VW Golf Variant Mk3/Mk4; VW Golf Plus; VW Golf Sportsvan; VW Jetta (A1); VW Jetta (A2); VW Vento; VW Bora; VW Passat (B1) SEAT Arosa; SEAT Tarraco Audi 50; Audi 80 (B1); Audi 100 (C1)	Components, Press shop, Seating technology	1938		53,461 (VW AG: 51,712, Sitech; Sitztechnik; GmbH: 1,749)	Oldest factory; Bombed during WW2, rebuilt shortly thereafter under leadership from British Army Major Ivan Hirst. Headquarters of Volkswagen AG. Informally known as Golfsburg after it was officially renamed for a week in November 2003 to celebrate the 5th generation Golf. 13 km^{2}. Also includes Sitech Sitztechnik GmbH. Used to include Auto 5000 Gmbh from 2002-2008.	52°26′11″N 10°46′9″E
Września	9	Europe, Poland	Września, Greater; Poland	VW Crafter; VW e-Crafter; VW Grand California; MAN TGE; MAN eTGE			2016		3,371	Volkswagen Commercial Vehicles (VWN) site. Volkswagen Poznań Sp. z o.o., Września Plant	
Yizheng (SAIC Volkswagen)		Asia, China	Yizheng, Jiangsu	VW Santana VW Tharu	Škoda Yeti Škoda Rapid		2012		2,759	SAIC Volkswagen Automobile Co., Ltd. Yizheng Branch	32°17′43″N 119°12′46″E
Zuffenhausen; Porsche	Z	Europe, Germany	Zuffenhausen, Stuttgart, Baden- Württemberg	Porsche 992, 718 Boxster/718 Cayman; Porsche Taycan	Mercedes-Benz 500E/E500, Audi RS2 Avant, Porsche 918 Spyder, Boxster/Cayman, Porsche 991, 997, 996, 993, 964, 911, 928, 968, 912/912E, 914/6, 356	V8 Engines, Flat-6 Engines, Flat-4 Engines, Electric Motors for EV's	1951		22,290	Porsche main factory – was used to build the Audi RS2 Avant under a joint venture agreement between Porsche and Audi. Built the 500E/E500 with Mercedes-Benz as part of a cooperation with Daimler-Benz.	48°50′9″N 9°9′9″E
Zwickau-Mosel	P	Europe, Germany	Zwickau, Saxony	VW ID.3; VW ID.4; VW ID.5; Cupra Born; Audi Q4 e-tron Audi Q4 Sportback e-tron Bentley Bentayga bodyshells for completion in Crewe, UK; Lamborghini Urus bodyshells for completion in Sant'Agata Bolognese, Italy	VW Golf (Mk2); VW Golf (Mk3); VW Golf (Mk4); VW Golf (Mk7) VW Passat (B5); VW Passat (B6); VW Passat (B7); VW Passat (B8); VW Polo (Mk2); VW Phaeton bodyshells for completion in the Transparent Factory in Dresden; Bentley Continental GT bodyshells for completion in Crewe, UK; Bentley Continental Flying Spur bodyshells for completion in Crewe, UK or Dresden, Germany		1991		9,930	Part of the Volkswagen Sachsen GmbH subsidiary. Has its origins as a pre-war Audi/Auto Union plant which became the VEB Sachsenring (Trabant) assembly plant after Auto Union relocated to Ingolstadt after WW2. The old plant built the VW Polo from 1990-1991 in a joint venture between VW & VEB called Volkswagen IFA-PKW GmbH. VW also built a new plant in Zwickau-Mosel which launched production with the Golf on February 15, 1991. Now home to the Audi AG-owned August Horch Museum. Complex also includes the nearby Special Vehicle construction site in St. Egidien, which handles special vehicles (e.g. emergency vehicles) and customization.	50°47′37″N 12°29′15″E
Zwolle	4 Scania; 5 Scania	Europe, Netherlands	Zwolle, Overijssel	Scania truck assembly			1964		1,445	Scania Production Zwolle B.V factory, part of Scania AB	52°30′46″N 6°3′48″E
Plant name	Plant VIN ID code(s)	Location (continent, country)	Location (town / city, state / region)	Current motor vehicle production	Former motor vehicle production	Automotive products & components	Year opened	Year closed	Number of employees	Note	Plant coordinates

== Former factories ==
Notes: In the second column of the table:- the 'factory VIN ID code', this is indicated in the 11th digit of the vehicles' 17 digit Vehicle Identification Number, and this factory code is only assigned to plants which produce actual completed vehicles. Component factories which do not produce complete vehicles do not have this factory ID code.

Plant name	Plant VIN ID code(s)	Location (continent, country)	Location (town / city, state / region)	Current motor vehicle production	Former motor vehicle production	Automotive products & components	Year opened	Year closed	Number of employees	Note	Plant coordinates
Alaminos		Asia, Philippines	Alaminos, Pangasinan		VW Polo Classic; VW Caravelle (T4); Audi A4 (B5); Audi A6 (C4)		1996	1999		Plant belonged to Proton Pilipinas Inc., 70% owned by Proton Holdings and 30% owned by Autocorp, a Filipino company.	
Bangkok		Asia, Thailand	Bangkok		VW Beetle VW Passat (B5); Audi A6 (C5)		1972; 2000	1974 ?		Plant belongs to Yontrakit Motors (Y.M.C. Assembly Co., Ltd.), which has also assembled vehicles for Peugeot, Citroën, and, before they had their own Thai plant, BMW. VW Beetle was assembled from 1972-1974. Production for VW restarted in 2000 with the Passat followed by the Audi A6.	
Buenos Aires Province plants of the former Chrysler Fevre Argentina		South; America, Argentina	San Justo, Buenos Aires Province and Monte Chingolo, Buenos Aires Province		Dodge 1500/ VW Dodge; 1500 W VW 1500; VW T2; VW Gacel/Senda; VW Carat		1980 (beginning of VW ownership)	Early 1990s		Chrysler Fevre Argentina was sold to VW in 1980. Renamed Volkswagen Argentina S.A. Part of Autolatina venture with Ford beginning in 1987. This led to VW closing the ex-Chrysler plants (San Justo first in 1987, then Monte Chingolo) and moving into the Ford complex in Pacheco.	
Clayton		Australia (continent), Australia	Melbourne, Victoria		VW Beetle; VW Type 2 VW Type 3 VW Country Buggy; VW Passat (B1); Audi Fox; VW Golf Mk1	Engines; Transmissions; Aluminum/Magnesium Alloy Foundry	1954	1977	0	1954: Volkswagen assembly commenced by Martin and King Pty Ltd, Clayton. 1957: Factory purchased by newly formed Volkswagen (Australasia) Pty Ltd, which is 51% owned by Volkswagen Germany. 1959: An adjoining property is purchased to be the new VW administration headquarters, central parts warehouse and engine assembly shop. This complex becomes known as ‘Plant No. 2’. 1960: Engine assembly plant opens. 1964: VW buys out the Australian owners of 49% of Volkswagen (Australasia) Pty Ltd., which is now renamed Volkswagen Australasia Ltd. and is 100% owned by VW of West Germany. 1967: Engine manufacturing, transmission production, and foundry open. 1968: Ownership transferred to Motor Producers Limited, which is wholly owned by Volkswagen West Germany. Contract assembly is done for Datsun and Volvo cars and Mercedes-Benz trucks. 1976: Factory sold to Nissan Motors. 1977: Nissan ceases production of Volkswagens. Currently Holden Special Vehicles factory.	37°56′2″S 145°8′17.5″E
DMG Inc.		Asia, Philippines	Mandaluyong (1958-1974) Quezon City (1974-1981)		VW Beetle; VW Brasília; VW Passat; VW Toro; VW Type 2 VW Sakbayan; VW Trakbayan		1958; 1974	1974; 1981		Plant belonged to DMG Inc., VW's local distributor. Plant moved from Mandaluyong to Quezon City in 1974. DMG later went out of business in the mid-1980s.	
Dublin		Europe, Ireland	Dublin		VW Beetle; VW Type 2		1950	Mid-1980s		Assembled the first VW built outside Germany. Plant belonged to Motor Distributors Limited, VW's local distributor. Plant moved from Shelbourne Road in Ballsbridge to Naas Road in 1955.	
Düsseldorf	6	Europe, Germany	Düsseldorf, Düsseldorf region, North; Rhine- Westphalia		VW Type LT; VW Crafter (LT3); Mercedes-Benz Sprinter Previously: DKW F89; DKW 3=6; Auto Union 1000					Mercedes-Benz Commercial Vehicles site. Originally an Auto Union plant prior to the construction of the Ingolstadt plant, but was retained by Daimler-Benz following the sale of Auto Union to Volkswagen in 1964. Built the VW Crafter (LT3) and the Mercedes-Benz Sprinter under a joint venture agreement.	51°15′30″N 6°47′04″E
Ford Ipiranga Assembly Plant; AutoLatina	D	South; America, Brazil	Ipiranga, São Paulo		VW Delivery; VW Worker; VW L80; VW Volksbus 16.180 CO bus chassis Ford F-Series; Ford Cargo		1990 (for VW)	1996 (for VW)	0	Formerly part of Autolatina venture between Ford and VW from 1987-1996. When Autolatina disbanded in 1995-1996, VW built a new plant in Resende which opened in November 1996 to take over its truck & bus production since the Ipiranga plant stayed with Ford.	
Ford Pacheco Assembly Plant		South; America, Argentina	General Pacheco, Buenos Aires Province		VW Pointer; Ford Escort		1994 (for VW)	1996 (for VW)		Formerly Ford's Pacheco Car Assembly Plant. Part of Autolatina venture with Ford from 1987-1996. Ford kept this side of the Pacheco plant when Autolatina dissolved. VW kept what had been the truck side of Ford's Pacheco complex.	
Ford Sao Bernardo Assembly Plant; AutoLatina		South; America, Brazil	Sao Bernardo do Campo, São Paulo		VW Apollo; VW Logus; VW Pointer; Ford Verona; Ford Escort		1990 (for VW)	1996 (for VW)	0	Formerly part of Autolatina venture between Ford and VW from 1987-1996. Not to be confused with VW's Anchieta plant, also in Sao Bernardo do Campo, or the Chrysler plant in Sao Bernardo do Campo that VW bought in 1979-1980, which served as the first VW Truck & Bus plant.	
Fort Worth		North; America, United States	Fort Worth, Texas		Air-conditioning and heating systems and Plastic-trim		c.1978	1988	0	The dates indicate the duration of VW's use of the plant. Sold to Valeo S.A.	
Gmünd		Europe, Austria	Gmünd, Carinthia		Porsche 356/1; Porsche 356/2		1944	1950	300	First Porsche factory during war times and immediately after World War II. Porsche Konstruktionen GesmbH. Not part of Volkswagen AG.	
VW Ipiranga Assembly		South; America, Brazil	Ipiranga, São Paulo		VW Beetle; VW Type 2		1953	1957	0	VW's first assembly plant in Brazil. Assembled vehicles from knock-down kits. Replaced by Sao Bernardo do Campo (Anchieta) plant.	
Kaluga	G K Škoda	Europe, Russia	Grabtsevo Technology Park, Kaluga, Kaluga; Oblast	VW Tiguan Mk2 VW Polo (Russia) Škoda Rapid	VW Polo Sedan VW Jetta Mk5; VW Passat B6; VW Passat B7; VW Tiguan Mk1; VW Touareg; VW Caddy Mk3 VW Transporter (T5); VW Transporter (T6) Škoda Fabia Mk1; Škoda Fabia Mk2; Škoda Octavia Tour (Mk1); Škoda Octavia Mk2 Audi A6; Audi A7; Audi A8; Audi Q5; Audi Q7; Audi Q8	EA211 1.6L I4; Engine components	2007	2022	4,084	New 200 m^{2} facility; projected full annual output capacity of 150,000 vehicles to be reached during 2010, with employees rising to 3,000. All vehicles produced were initially semi knock downs (SKD), but full production (CKD) including welding & painting of car bodies started Oct. 2009. Audi SKD assembly began in 2009. Engine production began in 2015. Is served by Grabtsevo Airport, both part of Volkswagen Group Russia (OOO Volkswagen Group Rus). Production halted in March 2022 due to Russian invasion of Ukraine.	54°34′28″N 36°20′40″E
Karmann	K	Europe, Germany	Osnabrück, Lower Saxony & Rheine, North Rhine-Westphalia		Audi Cabriolet; Audi A4 (B6/B7) Cabrio; Audi S4 (B6/B7) Cabrio; Audi B7 RS4 Cabrio; VW Beetle cabriolet VW Beetle Hebmüller cabriolet (Type 14A) (last 12-14 examples); VW Type 18A (Karmann version); VW Karmann Ghia (Type 14); VW Karmann Ghia (Type 34); VW (Golf/Rabbit) Cabriolet; VW Cabrio 1995-1996; VW Golf Mk3 Variant; VW Scirocco Mk1; VW Scirocco Mk2; VW Corrado; VW Vento; Porsche 356 B Hardtop; Porsche 914/4 (VW-Porsche 914)	Roof components for: Audi A4/S4/RS4 Cabrio; VW New Beetle convertible	1901	2010		Wilhelm Karmann GmbH produced cars and components for Volkswagen Group. Bankruptcy in 2009. Osnabrück plant was taken over by VW. Rheine plant was closed. Rheine plant built Audi models while the VW's were built in Osnabrück.	52°15′57″N 8°4′40″E 52°18′38″N 7°26′47″E
Karmann Sao Bernardo do Campo		South; America, Brazil	Sao Bernardo do Campo, São Paulo		VW Karmann-Ghia (Type 14) VW Karmann Ghia TC		1961	1975	0	Karmann plant in Brazil (Karmann-Ghia do Brasil Ltda). This plant later assembled the Land Rover Defender from 1999-2006 from CKD kits supplied by Land Rover.	
Segambut		Asia, Malaysia	Segambut, Kuala Lumpur		Audi A4 (B5)		1995	?		Tan Chong Motor factory in Malaysia. Assembled under license from VW.	
Lagos	L	Africa, Nigeria	Ojo, Lagos; State		VW Beetle (VW 1300); VW Igala; VW Jetta; VW Santana; Audi 100		1975	1994	0	VW had a 40% stake in this joint venture, 35% was owned by the Nigerian government, and the other 25% was owned by other shareholders. VW sold its remaining shares in April 2006 to Barbedos Ventures Ltd., registered in Tortola in the British Virgin Islands.	6°27′43″N 3°12′56″E
Ludwigsfelde	7	Europe, Germany	Ludwigsfelde, Teltow- Fläming, Brandenburg		VW Crafter (LT3)					Mercedes-Benz Commercial Vehicles site. Built the LT3 and Mercedes-Benz Sprinter under a joint venture agreement.	52°19′27″N 13°16′10″E
Nizhny Novgorod	H	Europe, Russia	Nizhny Novgorod, Nizhny Novgorod Oblast	VW Taos Škoda Octavia Mk4 Škoda Kodiaq Škoda Karoq	VW Jetta Mk6 Škoda Octavia Mk3; Škoda Yeti		2012	2022		Plant belongs to GAZ Group. Does contract assembly for VW Group. Planned annual output capacity of 132,000 vehicles. Vehicles produced using complete knock down (CKD) method. Production halted in March 2022 due to Russian invasion of Ukraine.	
Nueva Palmira		South; America, Uruguay	Nueva Palmira, Colonia Department		VW Beetle VW Gol/Amazon/Parati	Diesel engine assembly for models from the Gol family	1962	1992		Julio Cesar Lestido SA plant. Julio Cesar Lestido SA is VW's long time distributor in Uruguay.	
Oskemen	D	Asia, Kazakhstan	Öskemen, East Kazakhstan Region		Škoda Fabia; Škoda Kodiaq; Škoda Octavia; Škoda Rapid; Škoda Superb; Škoda Yeti		2005	2020		Azia Avto factory. Assembled Skodas under license. Kazakhstan terminated Azia Avto's industrial assembly agreement with the government in 2020 and Azia Avto has since gone bankrupt.	
Otahuhu		Oceania, New Zealand	Otahuhu, Auckland		VW Beetle; VW Type 2 VW Golf Mk1		1954; 1958	1958; 1986		Motor Holdings factory. Assembled VWs under license. 1954-1958 in a former bus depot as Jowett Motors until renamed as VW Motors in 1955 after Jowett Cars, also assembled at the same plant, went out of business. 1958-1986 on Fort Richard Rd. as VW Motors, which also assembled Ramblers for AMC from 1958-1962 as well as Peugeot, Škoda, Fiat, and Datsun. Also built the Trekka. Sold to Mazda in the 1980s. Production ended in 1987.	
Pulo Gadung		Asia, Indonesia	Pulo Gadung, East Jakarta, Jakarta		VW Golf Mk6; VW Golf Mk7; VW Touran; VW T4; VW T5 Audi A4 (B8); Audi A6 (C7)		2009	2016		PT National Assemblers factory owned by Indomobil Group of Indonesia.	
SOVAC Production, Relizane		Africa, Algeria	Relizane, Relizane Province		Audi A3; Audi Q2; SEAT Arona; SEAT Ateca; SEAT Ibiza; SEAT León; Škoda Fabia; Škoda Octavia; Škoda Rapid; VW Amarok; VW Caddy; VW Golf; VW Passat; VW Polo; VW Tiguan		2017	2019		SOVAC Production S.P.A. factory. Assembled vehicles for VW Group in a joint venture with VW's local distributor, SOVAC SPA. VW was the minority partner. Production was suspended in 2019 due to government upheaval in Algeria and new regulations that banned importation of parts for local assembly.	
Sao Bernardo do Campo; Formerly Chrysler do Brasil	C	South; America, Brazil	Sao Bernardo do Campo, São Paulo		VW Worker; VW truck chassis for building minibuses		1969	1990	0	VW bought 67% of Chrysler Motors do Brazil in 1979 & it then bought the rest in 1980. Renamed Volkswagen Caminhões Ltda. in 1981. Became the first VW Truck & Bus plant. Replaced by Ford's Ipiranga plant as part of Autolatina venture between Ford and VW from 1987-1996. VW Truck & Bus production moved to Ford's Ipiranga plant in 1990 and this plant closed.	
Schinznach-Bad		Europe, Switzerland	Schinznach-Bad		VW Karmann Ghia (Type 14)		1957	1960		AMAG factory in Switzerland. Assembled from SKD under license from VW.	
Shah Alam		Asia, Malaysia	Shah Alam, Selangor		VW Beetle (1300); VW Golf; VW Type 2		1968	198?		Champion Motors factory in Malaysia. Assembled under license from VW. Champion Motors was renamed Assembly Services Sdn. Bhd. (ASSB) in April 1975.	
South Charleston		North; America, United States	South Charleston, West Virginia		Exterior sheetmetal stampings for VW's Westmoreland assembly plant and other automakers.		1978	1987	0	The dates indicate the duration of VW's use of the plant. The plant was originally a Naval Ordnance plant built by the US government from 1917-1921. FMC Corporation bought the plant in 1961 and made armored personnel carriers there from 1962-1969. Developer Ray Park then bought around two-thirds of the complex. The Machine Shop became this stamping plant. Prior to VW, plant was operated by American Motors from 1974. After VW closed the plant, it became South Charleston Stamping & Manufacturing Company. In 1989, South Charleston Stamping was taken over by International Controls Corporation. In 1996, South Charleston Stamping was sold to Mayflower Vehicle Systems and then to Union Stamping and Assembly in 2004. Union Stamping and Assembly went bankrupt in 2006. Currently operated by Gestamp since 2012.	
Sterling Heights		North; America, United States	Sterling Heights, Michigan		Nothing		1980	1983	0	Opened by Chrysler's Missile Division in 1953. VWoA bought it in 1980 to be its second US assembly plant but they never ended up using it and sold it back to Chrysler in 1983.	
Steyr-Daimler Puch	G	Europe, Austria	Graz, Styria		VW Type 2 (T3); VW Golf Country; Audi V8L		1983 (1934-5, 1964)	1995	0	Former contract manufacturing factory	48°2′18″N 14°25′54″E
Tahara plant	9	Asia, Japan	Tahara, Aichi		VW Taro		1989	1997		Toyota Group plant. The dates indicate the duration of this joint venture project.	
Tanjung Priok		Asia, Indonesia	Tanjung Priok, North Jakarta, Jakarta		VW Beetle; VW Type 2 (T2); VW Camat; VW Mitra Mercedes-Benz W114/W115; Mercedes-Benz short-bonnet trucks		1971 (Mercedes-Benz) 1972 (VW)	1985		PT German Motor Manufacturing joint venture factory equally owned by VW, Daimler-Benz, and PT Indophing Finance Group of Indonesia. Joint venture ended in 1979.	
Taoyuan; Chin Chun Motor Co. Ltd.	C	Asia, Taiwan	Taoyuan, Taiwan		VW Transporter (T4)		1993	1997		Joint venture – VW AG owned 1/3 total capital	
Uusikaupunki	U	Europe, Finland	Uusikaupunki		Porsche Boxster (986) Porsche Boxster/Cayman (987)		1998	2012		Valmet Automotive factory. Built vehicles under contract for Porsche. Production dates are for Porsche only.	
Westmoreland	V	North; America, United States	New Stanton, Westmoreland County, Pennsylvania		VW Rabbit; VW Golf Mk2; VW Jetta Mk2; VW Rabbit pickup		1978	1988	0	Originally built by Chrysler in the 1960s, but was not completed until VWoA bought it in 1976 and began production in 1978. Sony took over the site in 1990 to manufacture televisions. Sony closed the plant in 2009. Aquion Energy occupied the site from 2014-2017. In 1994, its VIN ID code was reassigned to the Portuguese Palmela factory.	40°11′12″N 79°34′39″W
Windsor	R	North; America, Canada	Windsor, Ontario		VW Routan		2008	2013		Chrysler Group plant. Production dates are for VW production only. 2009-2014 model years.	
Wülfrath		Europe, Germany	Wülfrath, North Rhine-Westphalia		VW Beetle Hebmüller cabriolet (Type 14A) VW Type 18A (Hebmüller version)		1924	1952		Hebmüller And Sons was a German coachbuilder. A major fire on July 23, 1949 almost completely destroyed the factory. Although the factory was rebuilt and production did resume, the recovery exceeded the company's financial resources. Hebmüller filed for bankruptcy in 1952. Wülfrath plant was sold to Ford in 1956. Ford used it as a component plant, later specializing in steering components. When Ford spun off its parts operations as Visteon in 2000, the Wülfrath plant became part of Visteon. In 2007, Visteon sold it to private equity and it became known as Tedrive Steering GmbH, part of Tedrive Group. Tedrive Steering GmbH was sold to Knorr-Bremse in 2016. Renamed Knorr-Bremse SteeringSystems GmbH in 2017.	
Zama		Asia, Japan	Zama, Kanagawa Prefecture		VW Santana		1984	1989		Nissan Motor Co. plant. Built under a cooperation agreement. Production dates are for VW production only.	
Plant name	Plant VIN ID code(s)	Location (continent, country)	Location (town / city, state / region)	Current motor vehicle production	Former motor vehicle production	Automotive products & components	Year opened	Year closed	Number of employees	Note	Plant coordinates

== Gallery ==
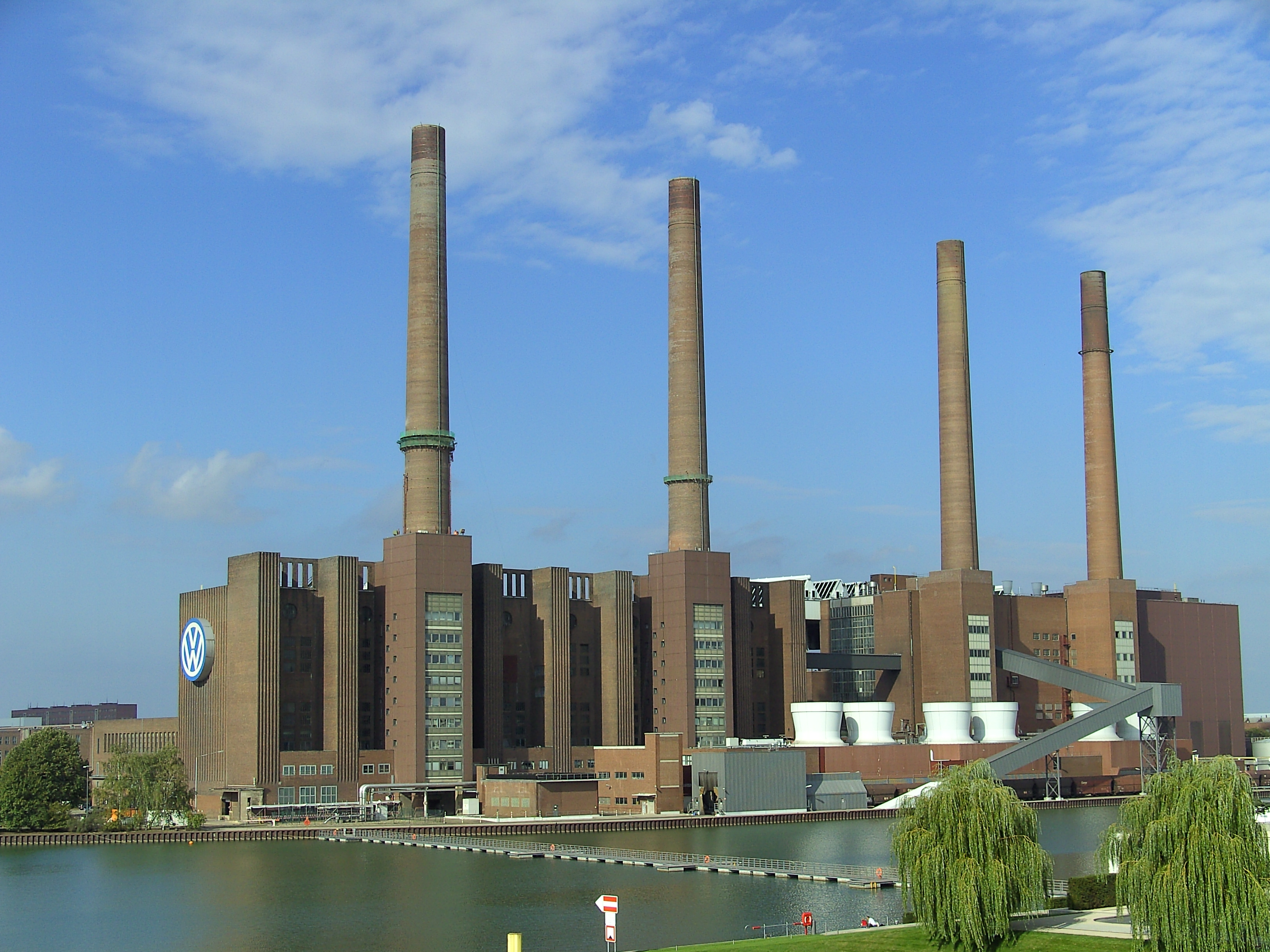
Volkswagen Wolfsburg

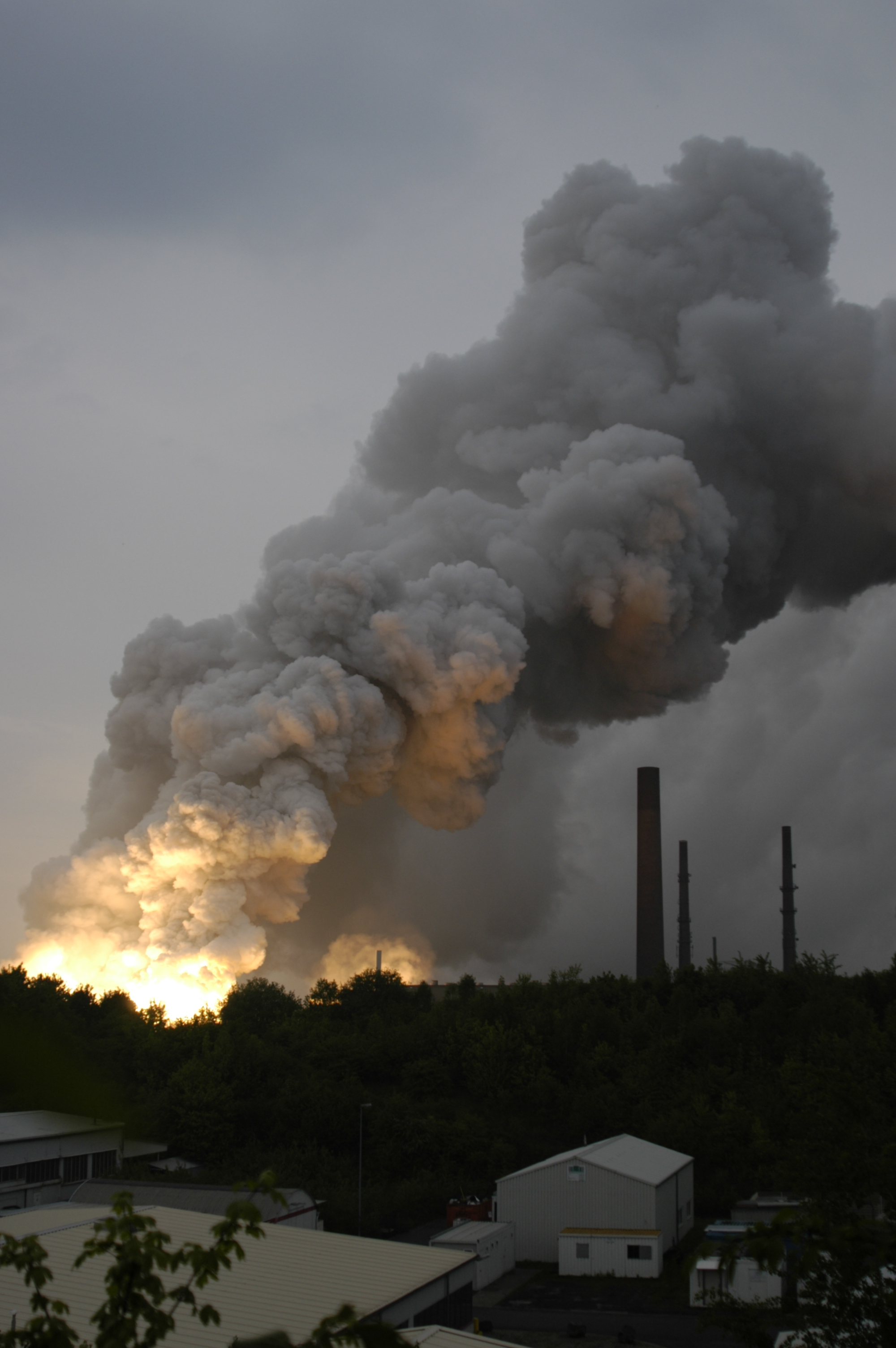
The magnesium fire at the Baunatal plant in May 2006

== See also ==
- List of former automotive manufacturing plants
- List of Fiat Group assembly sites
- List of Chrysler factories
