= Volkswagen Sarajevo =

Car factory in Vogošća, Bosnia and Herzegovina

Volkswagen Sarajevo d.o.o.
- Type: Društvo s ograničenom odgovornošću
- Industry: Automobiles
- Founded: 1998
- Headquarters: Sarajevo, Bosnia and Herzegovina

Volkswagen Sarajevo d.o.o. is an automobile manufacturer with headquarters in Vogošća, a northern suburb of Sarajevo. The company, which is majority-owned by the Volkswagen group, is a successor to the automobile plant Tvornica Automobila Sarajevo, which operated at the same location from 1972 to 1992 and in which Volkswagen held a 49% stake. The plant mainly produces containers for automobile production.

The vehicle production, which existed between 1998 and 2008, was terminated due to the abolition of the tariffs between the EU and Bosnia and Herzegovina that existed until then. An electric van has been manufactured in the factory since 2009. Volkswagen Sarajevo d.o.o. became a chassis components factory since 2011, with the factory focus also shifting towards production of special structures for the transport of parts.

== Products ==
=== Current ===
The main products of the plant include stub axle, ring gears, wheel hubs and wheel flanges.

=== Former ===
- Volkswagen Buba
- Volkswagen Caddy Mk1
- Volkswagen Golf Mk1
- Volkswagen Golf Mk2
- Volkswagen Golf Mk4
- Volkswagen Jetta (A1)
- Volkswagen Jetta (A2)
- Škoda Felicia
- Škoda Fabia Mk1
- Škoda Octavia Mk1
- Eco Carrier

== History ==
In August 1998 production started in the new company. Volkswagen has a 58% stake in the new company, 42% belong to the Bosnian automotive supplier Prevent. Since then, Volkswagen Sarajevo d.o.o. has produced cars for the Volkswagen, Audi and Škoda brands, most recently around 3,500 vehicles per year with around 300 employees. Car production ended at the end of 2008. Since then, parts have been manufactured for other plants in the VW Group. In mid-2009, the production of the electric small transporter EcoCarrier , which is to be used primarily at airports and in the municipal sector, began. The vehicle will be delivered on behalf of the company EcoCraft Automotive.

== See also ==
- List of Volkswagen Group factories
- List of companies of the Socialist Federal Republic of Yugoslavia
