= Narasapura Industrial Area =

The Narasapura Industrial Area is a large area industrial regions in Karnataka State; Kolar District; near Narsapura, India. The name means "praiseworthy dwelling place". This industrial area is expected to contribute 1.25% of the GDP towards the Indian economy. This Industrial Area is near Narasapura town, In Kolar (Vemgal Industrial Area, Narasapura Industrial Area and Malur Industrial Area). Kolar is one of only 16 Districts in India which is established under national investment and manufacturing zones (NIMZs). The National Manufacturing Policy (NMP) has the objective of enhancing the share of manufacturing in GDP to 25 per cent and creating 100 million jobs over a decade.

== Infrastructure ==
The Area developed to an extent of 700.75 acres initially and notified 1,480 acres under Section 28(1) of the KIADB Act for the second phase. For the third phase, it has identified 2,000 acres. The industrial area is abutting the NH-4, and is about 15 km from Kolar city and 55 km from Bangalore city. The Nearest Airport Kempegowda International Airport is 50 km from the industrial area. The industrial area is connected to Railway Stations at Kolar and Malur which are 15 km away on either side of the industrial area. In the Industrial Area multi-line access road, underground cable for power supply and street lights with dual water supply pipeline for potable and tertiary treated water. The existing substation is upgraded to 32 MW for uninterrupted power supply and also KIADB is planning to construct 220/66/11 KV Sub Station in this industrial area. In addition to this, common facilities such as park, buffer zone, parking is also provided.

=== Railway ===
There is proposed railway line between Whitefield-Kolar at the cost of Rs 353.45 corers INR which will further crate for People and Freight Movement.

=== Roads ===
This industrial zone will be catered by upcoming Chennai Bangalore Industrial Corridor, with connectivity to Chennai Port for exports. It is also catered by the existing Old Madras Road NH4. There is also Connectivity to Malur, whitefield, Hoskote and KR Puram.

=== Water ===
The state government has hit on the idea of supplying about 200 million litres per day of treated water to Kolar’s Industrial areas from Bellandur Lake in Bangalore.

=== Manpower ===
There is an estimation of about 1 million people to be working in industrial areas.

== List of companies ==
- KCM Appliances Pvt Ltd Manufactures Home Appliances(Pressure cooker: Non Stick: Diecast: Stainless Steel Utensils Etc)
- Mahindra Aerospace: manufactures 2, 4 and 6 seated family & commercial planes for the Indian and international markets
- Honda Motorcycle and Scooter India Pvt. Ltd: one of the largest manufactures of two wheeler, Honda active and Honda Yuva
- Triumph: manufacturing of cruise bikes
- Volvo: bus manufacturers
- Bando: manufacturers of engines belts, high strength rubber products
- Scania: a Volkswagen Company manufacturing luxury passenger bus with a competition with Volvo; also manufactures high end trucks
- Exedy Clutch India Pvt Ltd: manufactures of clutch systems
- Lumax: manufactures of automotive spares
- Indo: manufactures of electrical and electronics
- Ask Automotive Pvt Ltd: manufactures brake panels and engine parts for two wheelers
- Wistron infocomm: manufactures iPhones for the Indian market
- Paratus BuildCon Private Limited: Residential Layout Developers.

Many companies have acquired industrial plots to build their centres soon.
