= Volkswagen Worker =

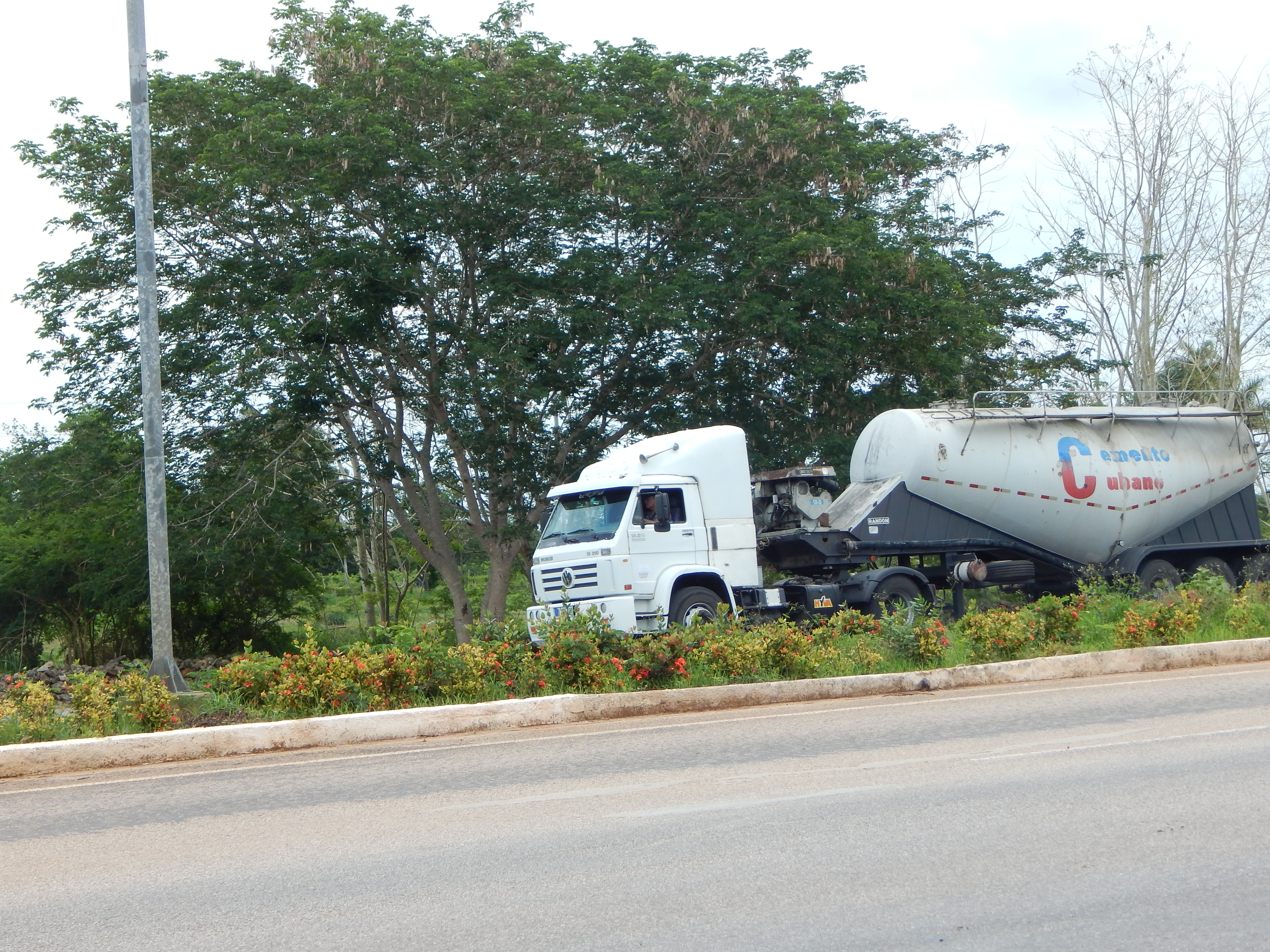
Volkswagen Worker truck in Cuba

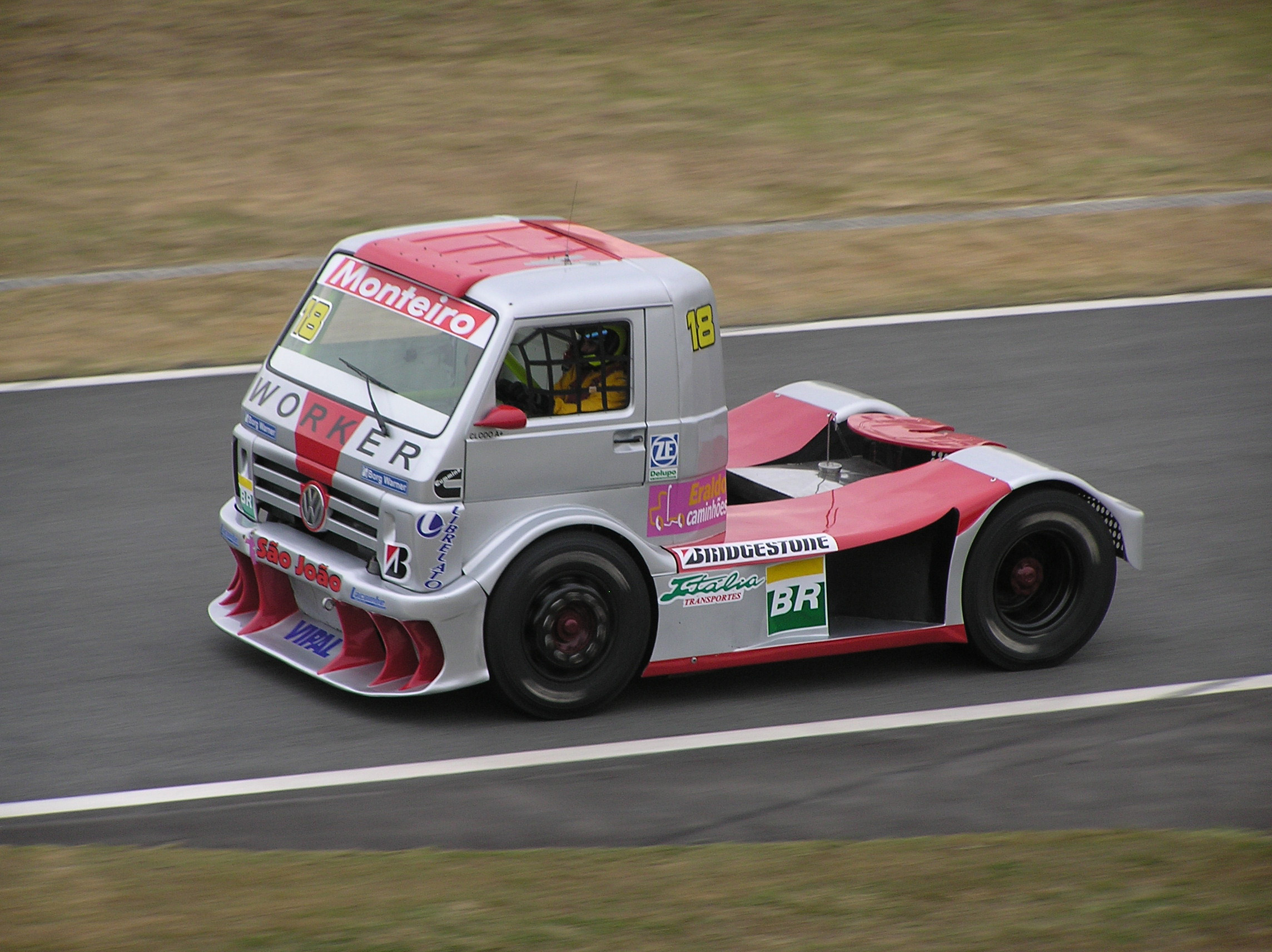
Volkswagen Worker Formula Truck competing in the Brazilian Fórmula Truck Championship.

The Volkswagen Worker range covers the 8 Tonne to 31 Tonne (GVW) category in the Volkswagen Caminhões e Ônibus range.

- 17 model variants.
- 9 are Electronic Engines 5 Cummins & 4 MWM all Common Rail Diesel Engined.
- 8 Mechanical Engines 4 Cummins and 4 MWM.
- The majority of the Worker range has been driven on 3 Continents & 30 Countries in the Toughest Conditions e.g. South America.

== Specs and range ==
The 1st number before . = the Gross Vehicle Weight the 2nd number = the Horsepower rating.

E= Electronic Versions

- 8.120 Euro III
- 8.150E
- 13.170E
- 13.180 Euro III
- 13.180E
- 15.170E
- 15.180 Euro III
- 15.180E
- 17.180 Euro III
- 17.220 Euro III
- 17.220 Euro III tractor
- 17.250E
- 24.220 Euro III
- 24.250E
- 26.220 Euro III
- 26.260E
- 31.260E

Rigids / Freight carriers / Tippers
Model	Engine make/Capacity	Power kW@rpm	Torque Nm@rpm	Transmission Make/Type/Speed	GVM (kg) Technical Capacity	GCM (kg) Technical Capacity
8.120	MWM 4.10-TCA-EURO III (Turbo Intercooler)	84.6 @ 2400	400 @ 1600	Eaton FS-4305-C Synchromesh 5 Speed	7700	10500
8.150E	Cummins Interact 4.0-EURO III (Turbo Intercooler)	110 @ 2500	550 @ 1400 - 1700	Eaton FS-4305-C Synchromesh 5 Speed	8150	11000
13.170E	MWM 4.10-TCA-EURO III (Turbo Intercooler)	125 @ 25000	600 @ 1200 - 1600	Eaton FS-4205-A Synchromesh	12900	23000
13.180	MWM 6.10 TCA-EURO III (Turbo Intercooler)	127 @ 2400	600 @ 1700	Eaton FS-4205-A Manual Synchromesh 5 Speed	13000	23000
13.180E	MWM 4.12 TCE-EURO III (Turbo Intercooler)	132 @ 2200	600 @ 1600 - 2000	Eaton FS-4205-A Manual Synchromesh 5 Speed	12900	23000
15.170E	Cummins Interact 4.0-EURO III (Turbo Intercooler)	125 @ 2500	600 @ 1200 - 1600	Eaton FS-4205-A Manual Synchromesh 5 Speed	14500	27000
15.180	MWM 6.10 TCA-EURO III (Turbo Intercooler)	127 @ 2400	600 @ 1700	Eaton FS-4205-A Manual Synchromesh 5 Speed	14500	27000
15.180E	MWM 4.12 TCE-EURO III (Turbo Intercooler)	132 @ 2200	600 @ 1600 - 2000	Eaton FS-4205-A Manual Synchromesh 5 Speed	14500	27000
17.180	MWM 6.10 TCA-EURO III (Turbo Intercooler)	127 @ 2400	600 @ 1700	Eaton FS 5306-A Manual Synchromesh 6 Speed	16000	28800
17.220	Cummins C8.3215 P5-0-EURO III (Turbo Intercooler)	160 @ 2200	888 @ 1400	Eaton FS 6306-A Manual Synchromesh 6 Speed	16000	35000
17.250E	Cummins Interact 6.0-EURO III (Turbo Intercooler)	184 @ 2500	950 @ 1200 - 1700	Eaton FS-6306-B Manual Synchromesh 6 Speed	16000	35000
24.220	Cummins C8.3215 P5-0-EURO III (Turbo Intercooler)	160 @ 2200	888 @ 1400	Eaton FS-6306 A Manual Synchromesh 6 Speed	23000	35000
24.250E	Cummins Interact 6.0-EURO III (Turbo Intercooler)	184 @ 2500	950 @ 1200 - 1700	Eaton FS-6306 B Manual Synchromesh 6 Speed	23000	35000
26.220	Cummins C8.3215 P5-0-EURO III (Turbo Intercooler)	160 @ 2200	888 @ 1400	Eaton RT 8908-LL Manual Synchromesh 10 Speed 3 Reverse	23000	35000
26.260E	MWM 6.12TCAE-EURO III (Turbo Intercooler)	191 @ 2500	900 @ 1300 - 1900	Eaton RT 7608-LL Manual Synchromesh 10 Speed 3 Reverse	23000	42000
31.260E	MWM 6.12 TCAE-EURO III	191 @ 2500	900 @ 1300 - 1900	Eaton RT 7608-LL Manual Synchromesh 10 Speed 3 Reverse	23000	42000

TRACTORS
Model	Engine Make/Capacity	Power kW@rpm	Torque Nm@rpm	Transmission Make/Type/Speed	GVM (kg) Technical Capacity	GCM (kg) Technical Capacity
17.220 Tractor	Cummins C8.3 215 P5-0 (Turbo Intercooler)	160 @ 2200	888 @ 1400	Eaton FS 6306-A Manual Synchromesh 6 Speed	16000	35000

== Military Version - Worker 15.210 (4x4) ==
Developed in collaboration with Brazilian Army the Worker is a medium truck with 4x4, tested to ensure compliance with the requirements of a typical use by the military. The worker can carry up to 5t load on any terrain, although their maximum load capacity is greater.

The vehicle is designed to carry both military and for transporting general cargo, container, water and even to allow installation of anti-aircraft weaponry.

Was fully developed and adapted in Brazil Features: Total gross weight of 15 t, MWM 6.10 TCA adopted engine, of 206 hp and torque of 657 Nm, Eaton FS5406 transmission, front axle and transfer case Marmon-Herrington MVG 750, rear axle RS 23-145 with locking differential.
