= Volkswagen Jetta (A2) =

German car model

Volkswagen Jetta (A2, Typ 1G)
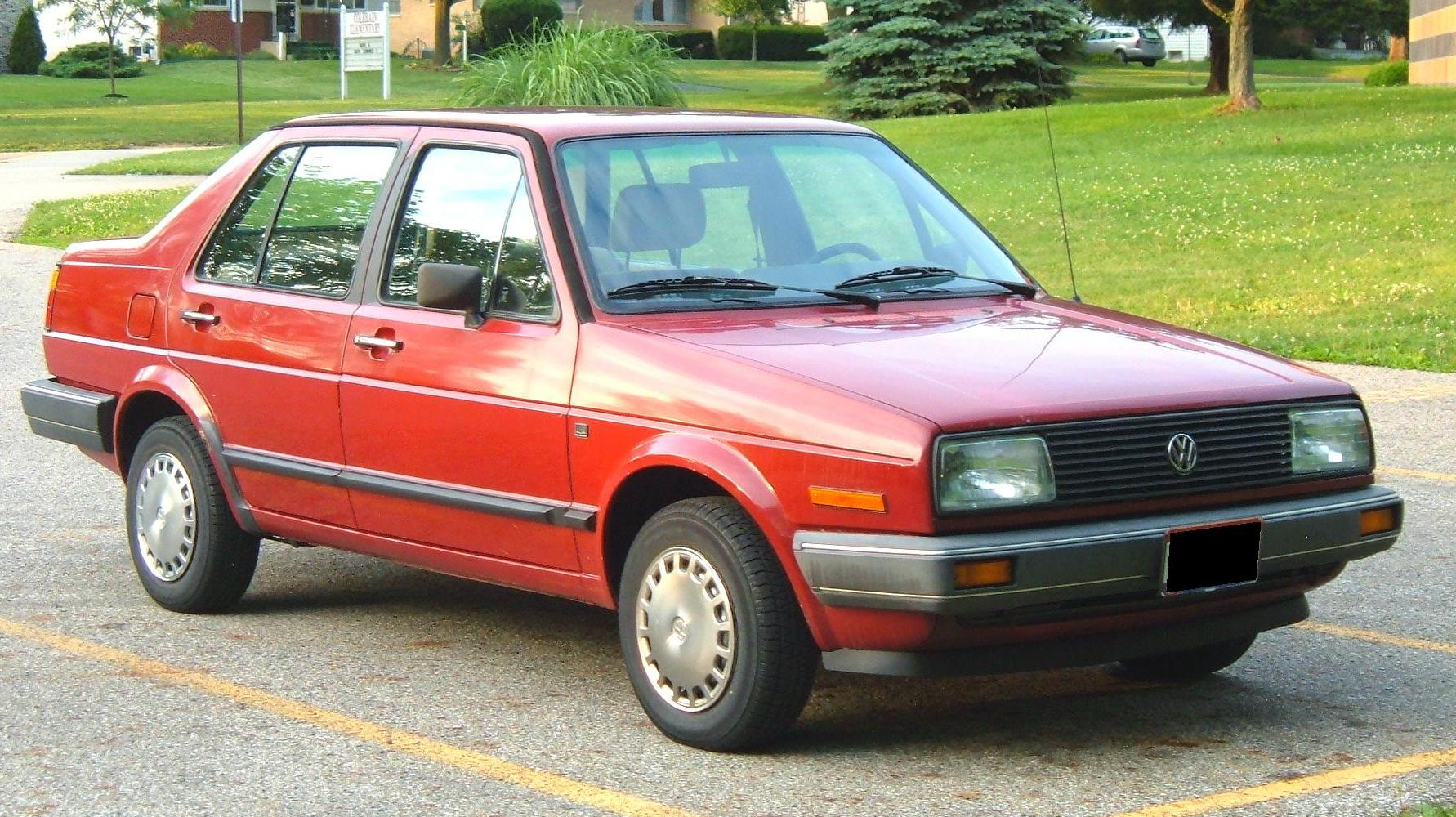
- 1985 Jetta 4-door (U.S. specification)

Overview
- Production: 1984–1992; 1991–2013 (China); 1,708,390 built
- Model years: 1985–1992 (North America)
- Assembly: Germany: Wolfsburg; China: Changchun (FAW-VW); Chengdu (FAW-VW); Mexico: Puebla; Nigeria: Lagos; South Africa: Uitenhage; United States: New Stanton, Pennsylvania (Volkswagen America); Yugoslavia: Sarajevo (TAS)

Body and chassis
- Body style: 4-door notchback sedan /saloon 2-door notchback sedan / saloon
- Layout: Front-engine, front-wheel-drive or four-wheel-drive
- Platform: Volkswagen Group A2 platform
- Related: Volkswagen Golf Mk2; Volkswagen Corrado; SEAT Toledo Mk1

Powertrain
- Engine: 1.3 L I4 (petrol); 1.6 L I4 (petrol); 1.8 L I4 8-valve (petrol); 1.8 L I4 16-valve (petrol); 2.0 L I4 16-valve (petrol); 1.6 L I4 (diesel); 1.6 L I4 (turbo diesel)
- Transmission: 4-speed manual 5-speed manual 3-speed automatic

Dimensions
- Wheelbase: 2,470 mm (97.2 in)
- Length: 1985–1988: 4,346 mm (171.1 in); 1989–1992: 4,385 mm (172.6 in)
- Width: 1,680 mm (66.1 in); 1985–1988 base models: 1,665 mm (65.6 in)
- Height: 1,410 mm (55.5 in)

Chronology
- Predecessor: Volkswagen Jetta (A1)
- Successor: Volkswagen Vento (A3); Volkswagen Jetta King (China)

The Volkswagen Jetta (A2) is a compact car, the second generation of the Volkswagen Jetta and the successor to the Volkswagen Jetta (A1). The Mark 2 series is the longest running Jetta so far. Introduced to Europe in early 1984 and to North America in 1985, the second generation Jetta proved to be a sales success for Volkswagen. The car secured the title of best-selling European car in North America, and outsold the similar Golf by two-to-one in that market. Based on the all new second generation Golf platform, the car was larger, heavier, and could seat five people instead of four as in the Mark 1. Exterior dimensions increased in all directions. Overall length was up by 100 mm (3.9 in), the wheelbase grew 66 mm (2.6 in), and the width went up 53 mm (2.1 in). The suspension setup was basically unchanged from the first generation, although refined slightly, for example by the inclusion of a separate subframe for mounting the front control arms to help noise isolation, as well as improved rubber mountings for all components. Aerodynamics improved considerably, with a drag coefficient of 0.36. With a 470-litre (16.6 cu ft) luggage compartment, the trunk had grown nearly as large as that of some full-sized American sedans. Interior room was also increased by 14 percent, which changed the EPA class from sub-compact to compact.

== Description ==
Cars built in Germany were assembled in a brand new (at the time) plant at Wolfsburg in Assembly Hall 54. The plant was heavily robotised in an effort to make build quality more consistent. New innovations on the second generation included an optional trip computer (referred to as the MFA, German Multi-Funktions-Anzeige), as well as silicone dampened engine and transmission mounts to reduce noise, vibration, and harshness levels. In 1988, a more advanced fully electronic fuel injection system became available. This arrangement is known as the Digifant engine management system.

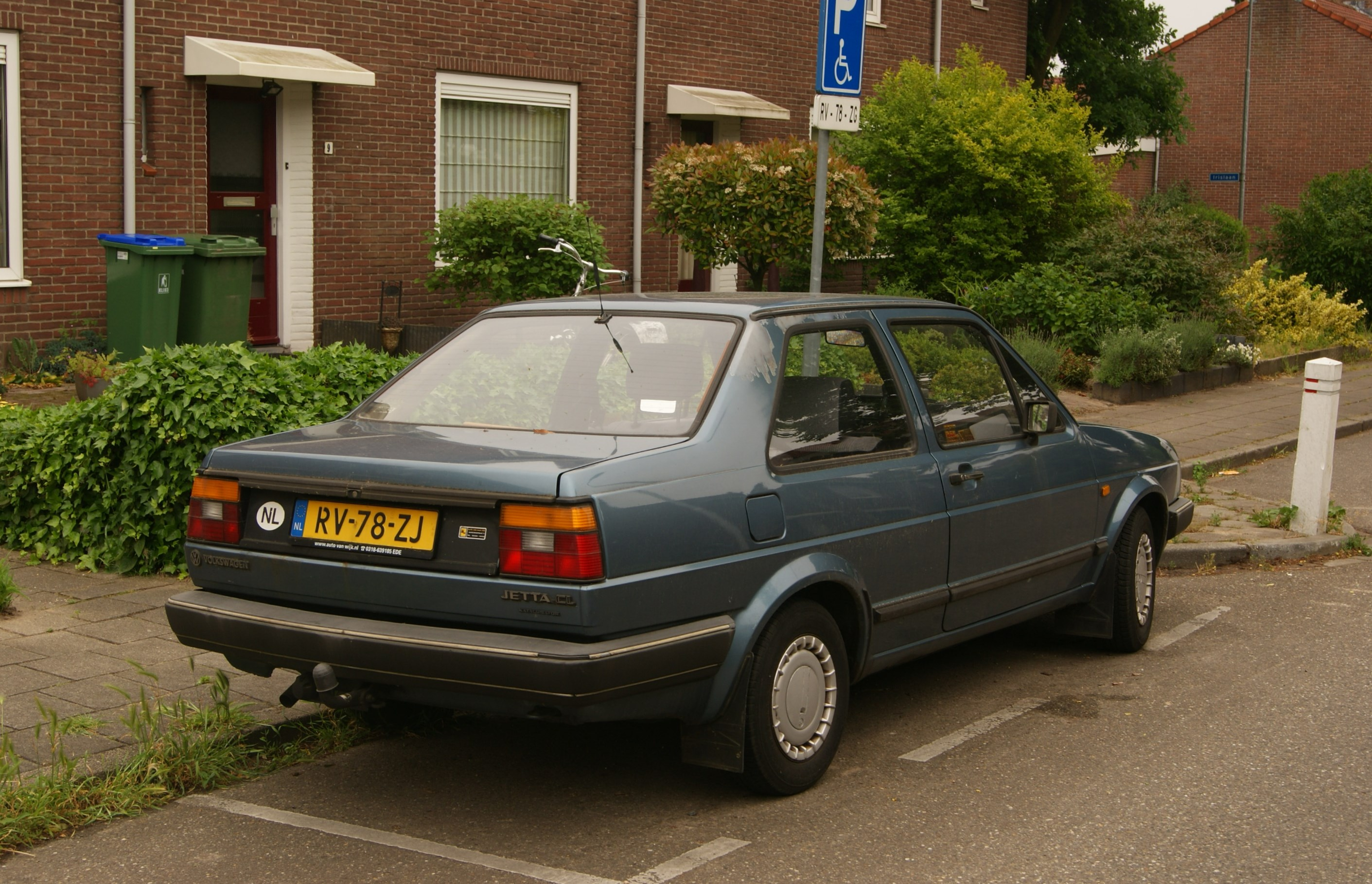
Volkswagen Jetta 2 door saloon (European specification)

Like the Mark 1, the second generation was offered as a two-door or four-door sedan. External changes throughout the series' run were few: the front-quarter windows were eliminated in 1988 (along with a grille and door trim change), and larger body-colored bumpers and lower side skirts were added from 1990.

In 2007, Volkswagen of America held a contest to find the diesel-powered Volkswagen with the highest distance traveled on the original engine. The winning car was a 1986 Jetta Turbodiesel found in Blue Rock, Ohio which had 562,000 miles (904,000 km). A local dealer verified the odometer reading. Notable on this particular car was that it also had the original muffler despite being located in an area subject to road salt in the winter.

They are also known for their cold and powerful air conditioning due to the use of industrial grade R12 refrigerant and a full-blast, non-regulated system.

== Safety and security ==
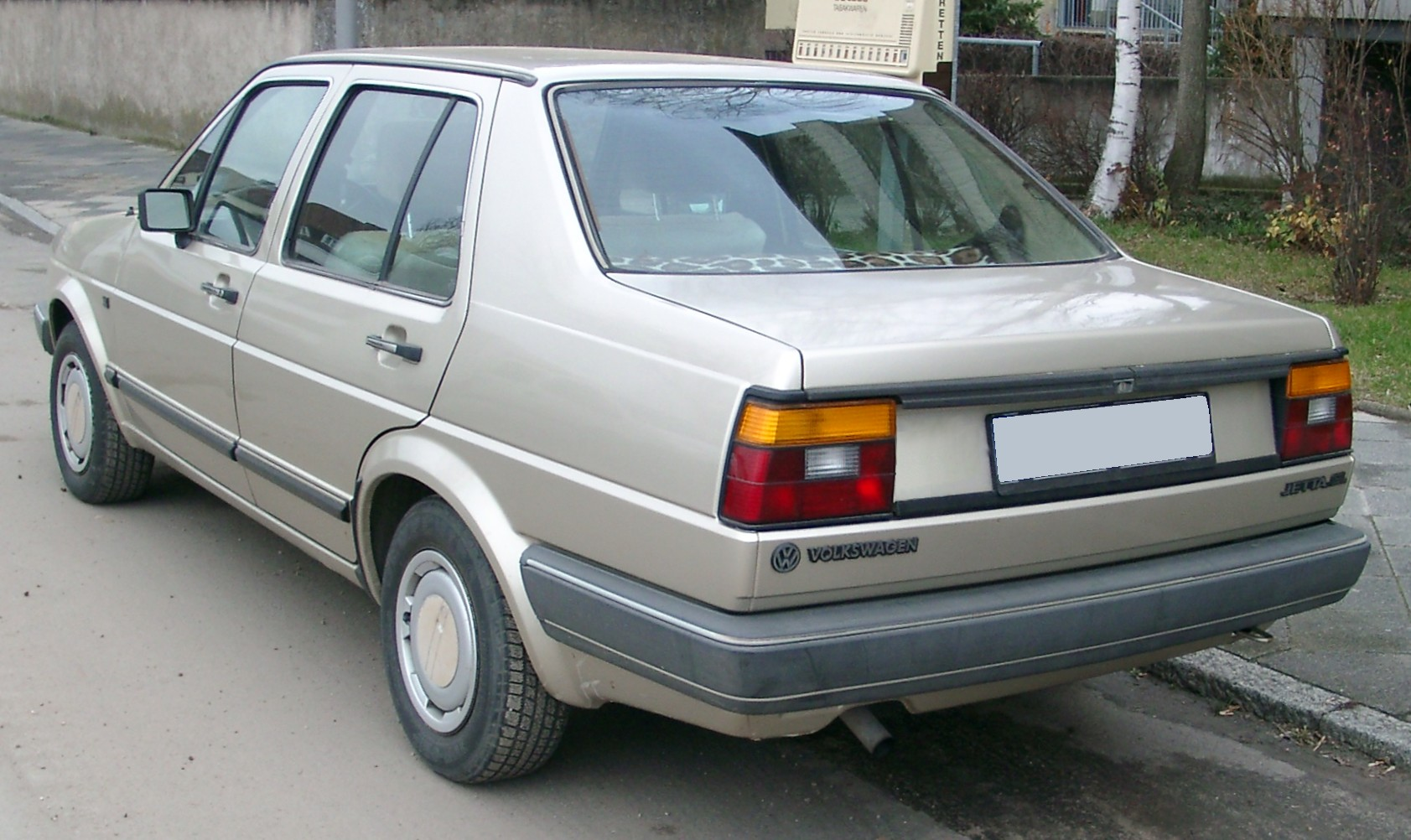
Jetta 4-door (German specification)

In a crash test conducted by the US National Highway Traffic Safety Administration, the Jetta received three out of five stars for both driver and passenger protection in a 56 km/h (35 mph) frontal crash test. The Highway Loss Data Institute (part of the Insurance Institute for Highway Safety) found the injury and collision losses for the Jetta to be among the best of the small 4-door sedan category. It was topped only by the Golf. These cars suffered an especially high rate of radio theft; The radio's slide-out mount made it easy to remove quickly, and radios thus stolen were readily compatible with numerous other German cars. To correct the problem, VW redesigned the radios such that when their power supply was interrupted, they would not work once power was restored until a unit-specific code would be entered. Dealerships had access to a code database, and could provide a lost code by radio serial number once legitimate ownership was proven.

== North America ==
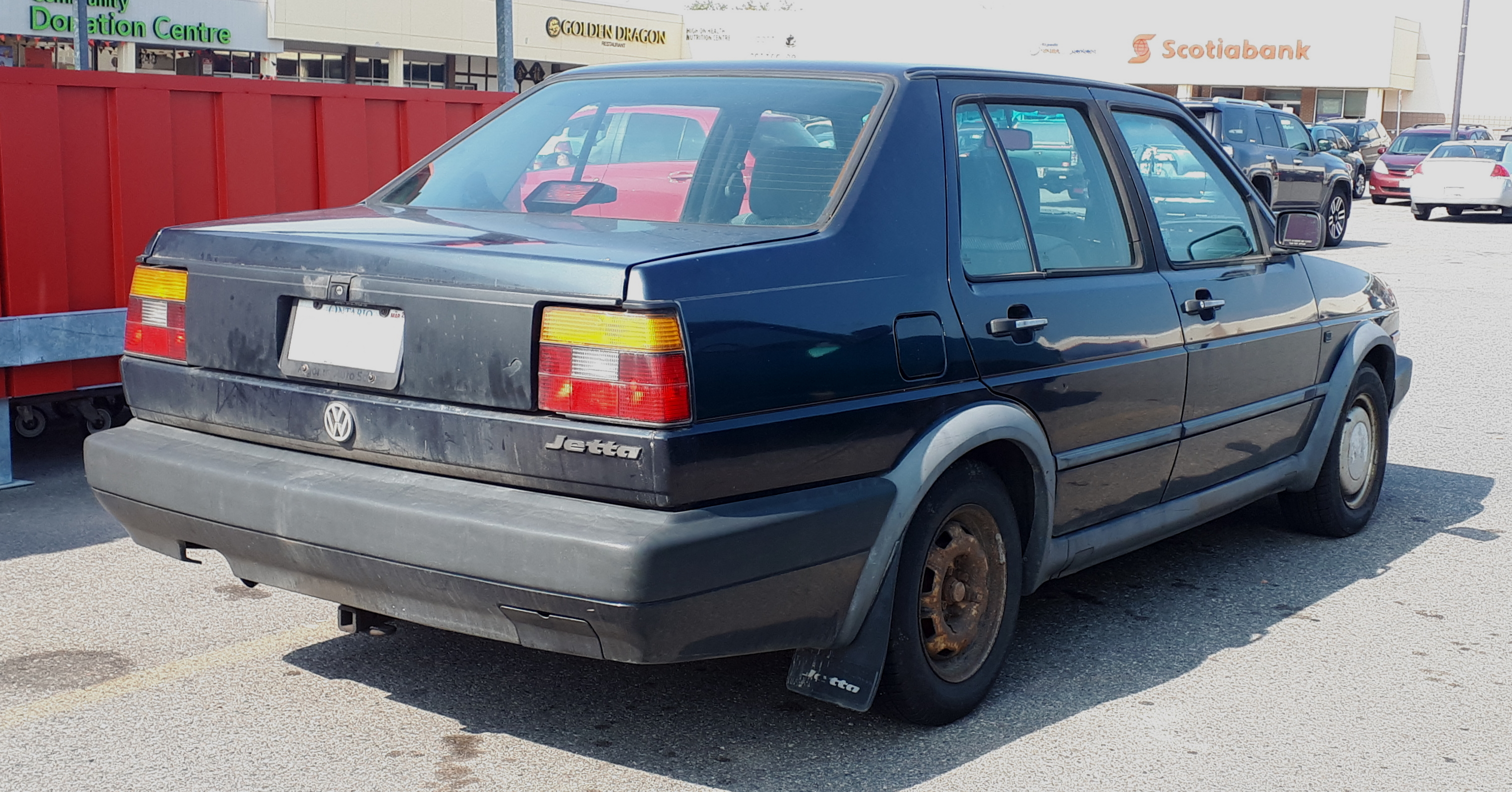
1990–1992 Jetta 4-door (Canadian specification)

The North American-market Jettas were substantially similar to the European model, with changes mostly driven by differences between American and European regulations covering vehicle safety and exhaust emissions, which necessitated different bumpers, headlamps and other lights, side-view mirrors, and seat belts.

North American models in general had a narrower range of specification available. Compared with European-market models, North American Jettas were generally not offered with options such as Syncro four-wheel drive, factory Recaro seats, headlamp washers and wipers, or the full range of engine variants available in Europe. of European variants. The Jetta was perceived as slightly upmarket from the Golf. The level of features was always a step above the Golf, with examples such as standard passive restraint in 1988, standard power steering in 1990, and 14-inch wheels available for most years.

Canadian-market models were better equipped than U.S. models; generally, the Canadian base models received the same level of options as an American GL, and the same with the GL and Carat. Diesel engines, both naturally aspirated and turbocharged, were available for all years in Canada; in the U.S. there was no diesel option for 1988, and only a non-turbo option for 1989 and 1990. Canadians could get a 2-door model for 1992 (it was dropped after 1991 in the U.S.). The early Carat model with heated velour sport seats, a GLi engine, and optional automatic transmission, and there were also color and trim differences between Canadian and U.S. models.

== Testing and review ==
The car received generally positive reviews, with critics praising the car's excellent handling, as well as a roomier interior compared to the last generation. Stiff shifting manual transmissions were a downside, and braking worked reasonably well although some brake fade was evident in the lower trim lines equipped with solid discs in front and drums in back. A number of reviews noted that the ride was stiff and busy, even though it did have good control typical of German cars. Despite additional sound insulation, road noise was evident especially on coarse pavement. In top sport trim (sometimes called the GLI or GTX), some reviewers noted the car was a less expensive alternative to a BMW or Audi. The sport trim added larger wheels, a stiffer suspension, and closer ratios on the manual transmission. From mid-1987 the Mark 2 GLI was offered with a 16-valve Twin-cam 1.8-litre engine, and was upgraded in early 1990 with the newer Mark 2 body style to a 2.0-litre 16-valve power plant (in North America).

== IRVW 3 ==
The IRVW 3 ("Integrated Research Volkswagen") was a 1983–1984 research study based on the not yet released Jetta II. In appearance it looked like nothing more than a slightly sporty Jetta, but it was packed with highly refined technology for its time. It was essentially a feasibility study for newly developed technology such as Anti-lock braking system and electric power steering. A number of functions were computer controlled, such as the overdrive gear for its four-speed manual gearbox. The engine was the familiar 1.8 litre inline-four from the Golf GTi, but here equipped with a Roots-type supercharger for a max power of 129–132 kW (173–177 hp; 175–179 PS). Top speed was 212 km/h (132 mph). The IRVW 3 also had a pneumatic suspension which automatically lowered the car when the speed surpassed 120 km/h (75 mph).

== Worldwide production ==
Besides the Volkswagen production base in Germany, this generation was produced in a number of other countries, including China, Nigeria, Mexico, South Africa, USA, and the former Yugoslavia.

=== China ===
The first known Jetta in China was the A2 model that was used as a passenger car and a taxicab.

The A2 was then given a facelift in April 1997 where it was known as the Jetta King. Available engines were a 1.6 litre petrol engine called the EA113 for civilian cars and a 1.9 litre diesel engine only available for taxi models. A 4-speed manual gearbox was standard, which could be replaced by a 5-speed manual gearbox, and then a 4-speed automatic gearbox was made available from November 1998. For 2002, the Jetta King was facelifted with a new exterior. Trim levels consisted of the AT, ATF, Avantgarde, CDX, CiF, CiX, CT, GDF, GiF, GT, GTI, GTX and Meeresbrise. This model was also converted into a 2-door pickup truck in limited numbers.

The A2 was facelifted again in March 2010 with the same engines used by its predecessor; it was known as the Jetta Pioneer. This version of the Jetta was not offered in different trim levels and was a single model for the Chinese market. A2-based Jetta production ended in March 2013 where it was replaced by an independent model called the Jetta Night and the new model exclusive to China was developed based on the Volkswagen Group A05+ platform.

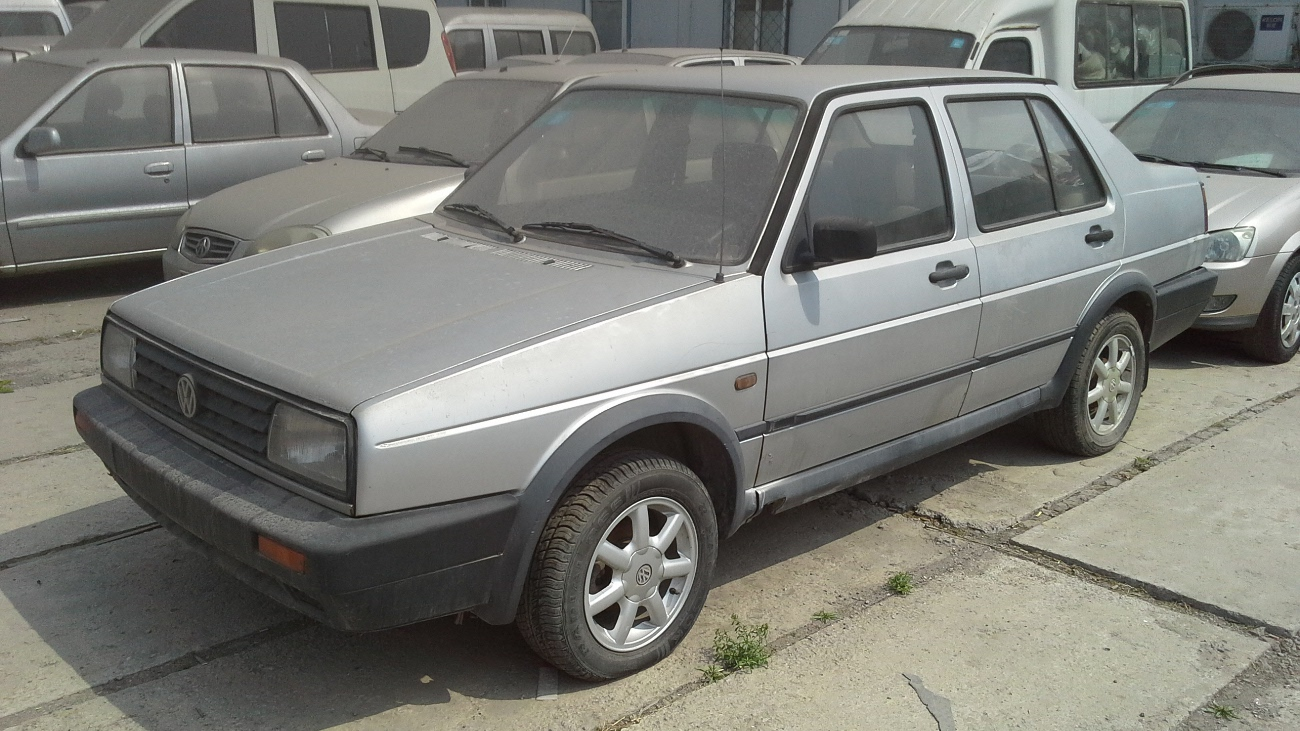
Volkswagen Jetta (China)

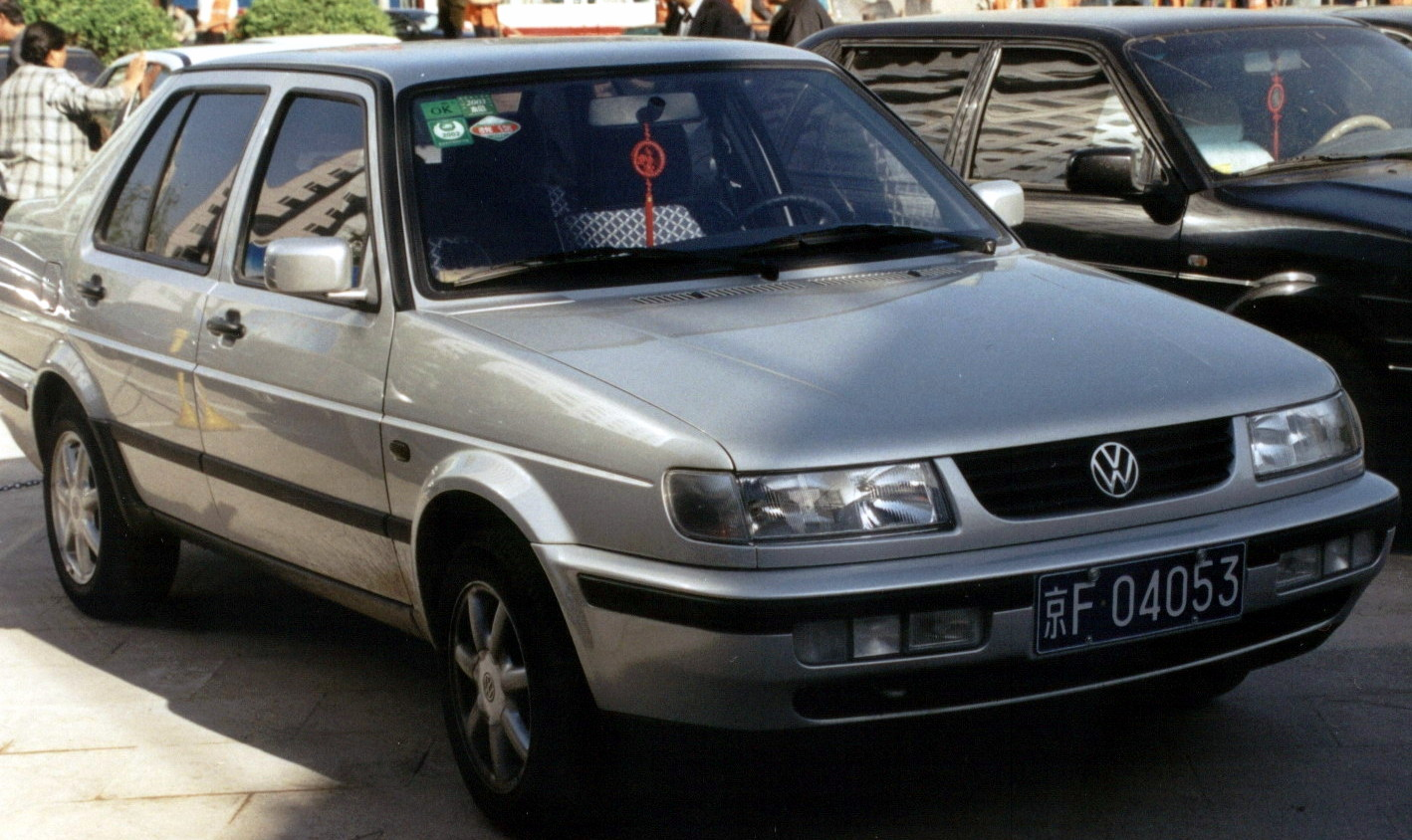
Volkswagen Jetta King (China)

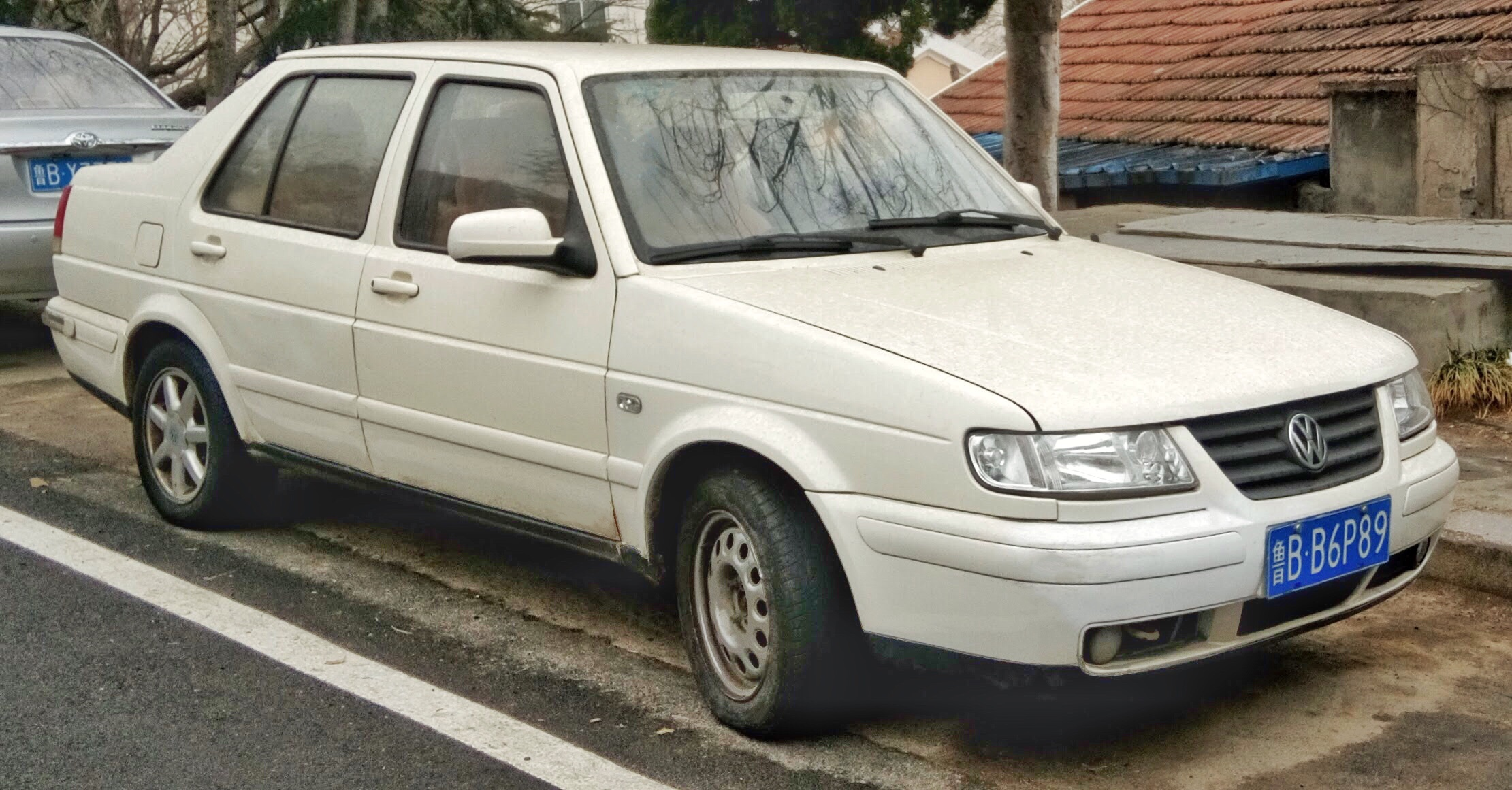
Volkswagen Jetta King minor facelift (China)

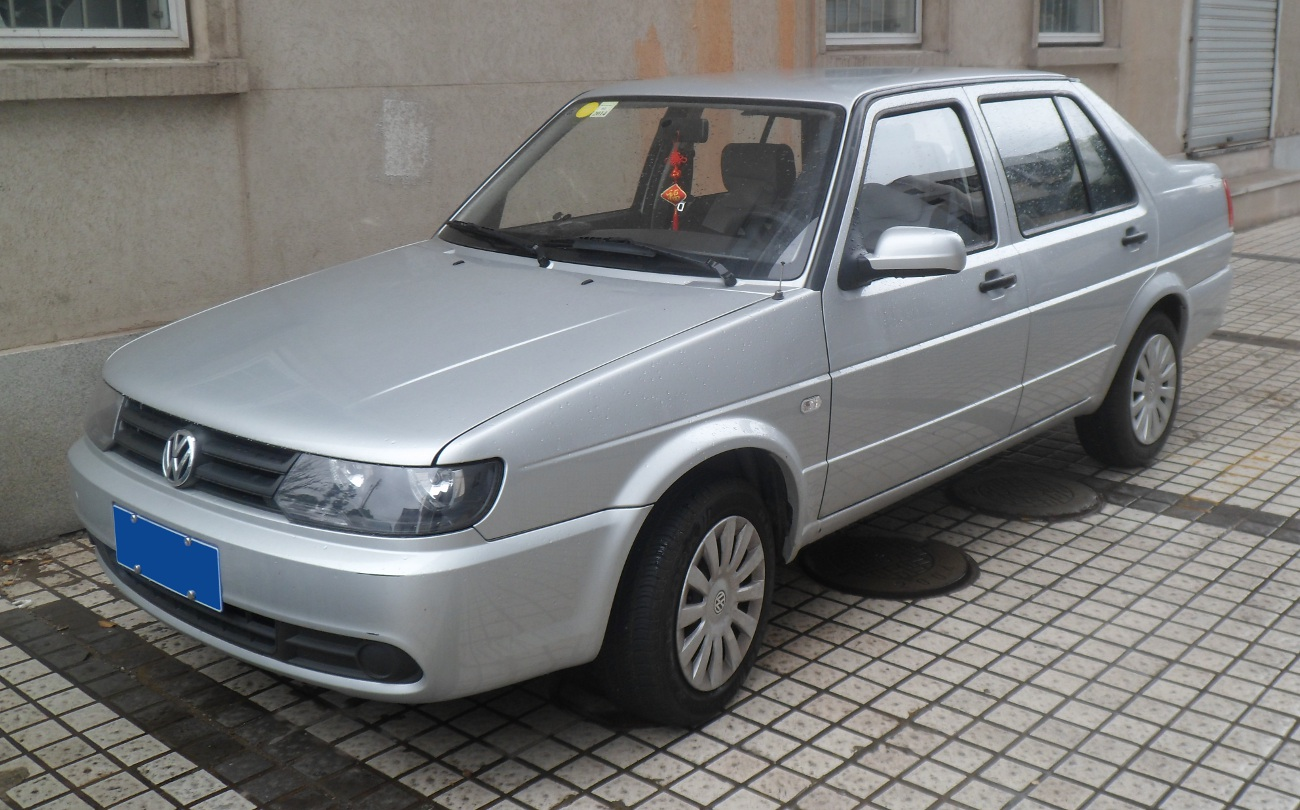
Volkswagen Jetta Pioneer (China)

== Engines ==
Model	Years	Engine and code		Displ.	Power	Torque	Notes
Petrol engines without catalytic converter
1.3	1984–1992	I4 Carburettor	HK/MH/2G	1,272 cc (77.6 cu in)	40 kW (55 PS; 54 hp) at 5200 rpm	94 N⋅m (69 ft⋅lbf) at 3300 rpm	
1.6	1984–1992	I4 Carburettor	EZ/ABN	1,595 cc (97.3 cu in)	55 kW (75 PS; 74 hp) at 5000 rpm	125 N⋅m (92 ft⋅lbf) at 2500 rpm	
1.8	1984–1991	I4 Carburettor	GU	1,781 cc (108.7 cu in)	66 kW (90 PS; 89 hp) at 5200 rpm	145 N⋅m (107 ft⋅lbf) at 3300 rpm	
1.8	1985–1987	I4 FI (K-Jetronic)	MV	1,781 cc (108.7 cu in)	66 kW (90 PS; 89 hp) at 5200 rpm	145 N⋅m (107 ft⋅lbf) at 3300 rpm	
1.8 GT	1984–1987	I4 FI	EV	1,781 cc (108.7 cu in)	82 kW (112 PS; 110 hp) at 5500 rpm	155 N⋅m (114 ft⋅lbf) at 3100 rpm	
1.8 GT	1987–1991	I4 FI	PB	1,781 cc (108.7 cu in)	82 kW (112 PS; 110 hp) at 5400 rpm	159 N⋅m (117 ft⋅lbf) at 4000 rpm	
1.8 GT 16V	1986–1991	I4 FI	KR	1,781 cc (108.7 cu in)	100 kW (136 PS; 134 hp) at 6100 rpm	168 N⋅m (124 ft⋅lbf) at 4600 rpm	
2.0 CLI 16V	1990–199?	I4 FI (KE-Motronic)	--	1,984 cc (121.1 cu in)	110 kW (150 PS; 148 hp) at 6400 rpm	175 N⋅m (129 ft⋅lbf) at 5000 rpm	South Africa
Petrol engines with catalytic converter
1.3	1985–1992	I4 FI	NZ	1,272 cc (77.6 cu in)	40 kW (55 PS; 54 hp) at 5200 rpm	97 N⋅m (72 ft⋅lbf) at 3000 rpm	
1.6	1985–1992	I4 Carburettor	PN	1,595 cc (97.3 cu in)	51 kW (69 PS; 68 hp) at 5200 rpm	118 N⋅m (87 ft⋅lbf) at 2700 rpm	
1.6	1986–1991	I4 Carburettor	RF	1,595 cc (97.3 cu in)	53 kW (72 PS; 71 hp) at 5200 rpm	120 N⋅m (89 ft⋅lbf) at 2700 rpm	
1.8	1983–1988	I4 FI (K-Jetronic)	GX	1,781 cc (108.7 cu in)	66 kW (90 PS; 89 hp) at 5200 rpm	137 N⋅m (101 ft⋅lbf) at 3300 rpm	
1.8	1986–1990	I4 Carburettor	RH	1,781 cc (108.7 cu in)	62 kW (84 PS; 83 hp) at 5000 rpm	142 N⋅m (105 ft⋅lbf) at 3000 rpm	
1.8	1986–1991	I4 FI	RP	1,781 cc (108.7 cu in)	66 kW (90 PS; 89 hp) at 5250 rpm	142 N⋅m (105 ft⋅lbf) at 3000 rpm	
1.8	1985–1992	I4 FI (KE-Jetronic/Digifant)	HT/RV	1,781 cc (108.7 cu in)	74 kW (100 PS; 99 hp) at 5250 rpm	146 N⋅m (108 ft⋅lbf) at 3000 rpm	
1.8	1992	I4 FI (Digifant)	RV	1,781 cc (108.7 cu in)	77 kW (104 PS; 103 hp) at 5250 rpm	149 N⋅m (110 ft⋅lbf) at 3000 rpm	
1.8 syncro	1988–1991	I4 FI	1P	1,781 cc (108.7 cu in)	72 kW (98 PS; 97 hp) at 5400 rpm	143 N⋅m (105 ft⋅lbf) at 3000 rpm	
1.8 GT	1985–1992	I4 FI (KE-Jetronic/Digifant)	RD/PF	1,781 cc (108.7 cu in)	79 kW (107 PS; 106 hp) at 5250 rpm	154 N⋅m (114 ft⋅lbf) at 3250 rpm	
1.8 GT	1986–1987	I4 FI	RG	1,781 cc (108.7 cu in)	79 kW (107 PS; 106 hp) at 5500 rpm	154 N⋅m (114 ft⋅lbf) at 3500 rpm	
1.8 GT/GLI/GTX 16V	1986–1991	I4 FI (KE-Jetronic)	PL	1,781 cc (108.7 cu in)	95 kW (129 PS; 127 hp) at 5800 rpm	168 N⋅m (124 ft⋅lbf) at 4250 rpm	
2.0 GLI/GTX 16V	1990–1992	I4 FI (KE-Motronic)	9A	1,984 cc (121.1 cu in)	100 kW (136 PS; 134 hp) at 5800 rpm	180 N⋅m (133 ft⋅lbf) at 4400 rpm	North America
Diesel engines
1.6 D	1983–1992	I4 diesel	JP/ME	1,588 cc (96.9 cu in)	40 kW (55 PS; 54 hp) at 4800 rpm	100 N⋅m (74 ft⋅lbf) at 2300–2900 rpm	
1.6 ECOdiesel	1991–1992	I4 Turbodiesel	1V	1,588 cc (96.9 cu in)	44 kW (60 PS; 59 hp) at 4500 rpm	110 N⋅m (81 ft⋅lbf) at 2400–2600 rpm	Catalyzed
1.6 TD	1983–1992	I4 Turbodiesel	JR/MF	1,588 cc (96.9 cu in)	51 kW (69 PS; 68 hp) at 4500 rpm	133 N⋅m (98 ft⋅lbf) at 2500–2900 rpm	
1.6 TD	1989–1991	I4 Turbodiesel	RA/SB	1,588 cc (96.9 cu in)	59 kW (80 PS; 79 hp) at 4500 rpm	155 N⋅m (114 ft⋅lbf) at 2500–3000 rpm	

== See also ==
- Volkswagen Golf Mk2
- Volkswagen Jetta (China)
