= Volkswagen Vento =

Volkswagen Vento can refer to:

- Volkswagen Vento (A3) (1992–1999), the third generation Jetta was marketed as the Volkswagen Vento outside North America and South Africa.
- Volkswagen Jetta (A5) (2005–2011), the fifth generation Jetta was marketed as the Volkswagen Vento in Argentina, Chile, Paraguay and Uruguay.
- Volkswagen Jetta (A6) (2011–2018), the sixth generation Jetta was marketed as the Volkswagen Vento in Argentina, Chile, Paraguay and Uruguay.
- Volkswagen Jetta (A7) (2018–present), the seventh generation Jetta was marketed as the Volkswagen Vento in Argentina, Paraguay and Uruguay.
- Volkswagen Vento (A05) (2010–2022), a Polo-based sedan was marketed as the Volkswagen Vento in Mexico and some Asian countries, including India, Nepal and, after a facelift, Malaysia.
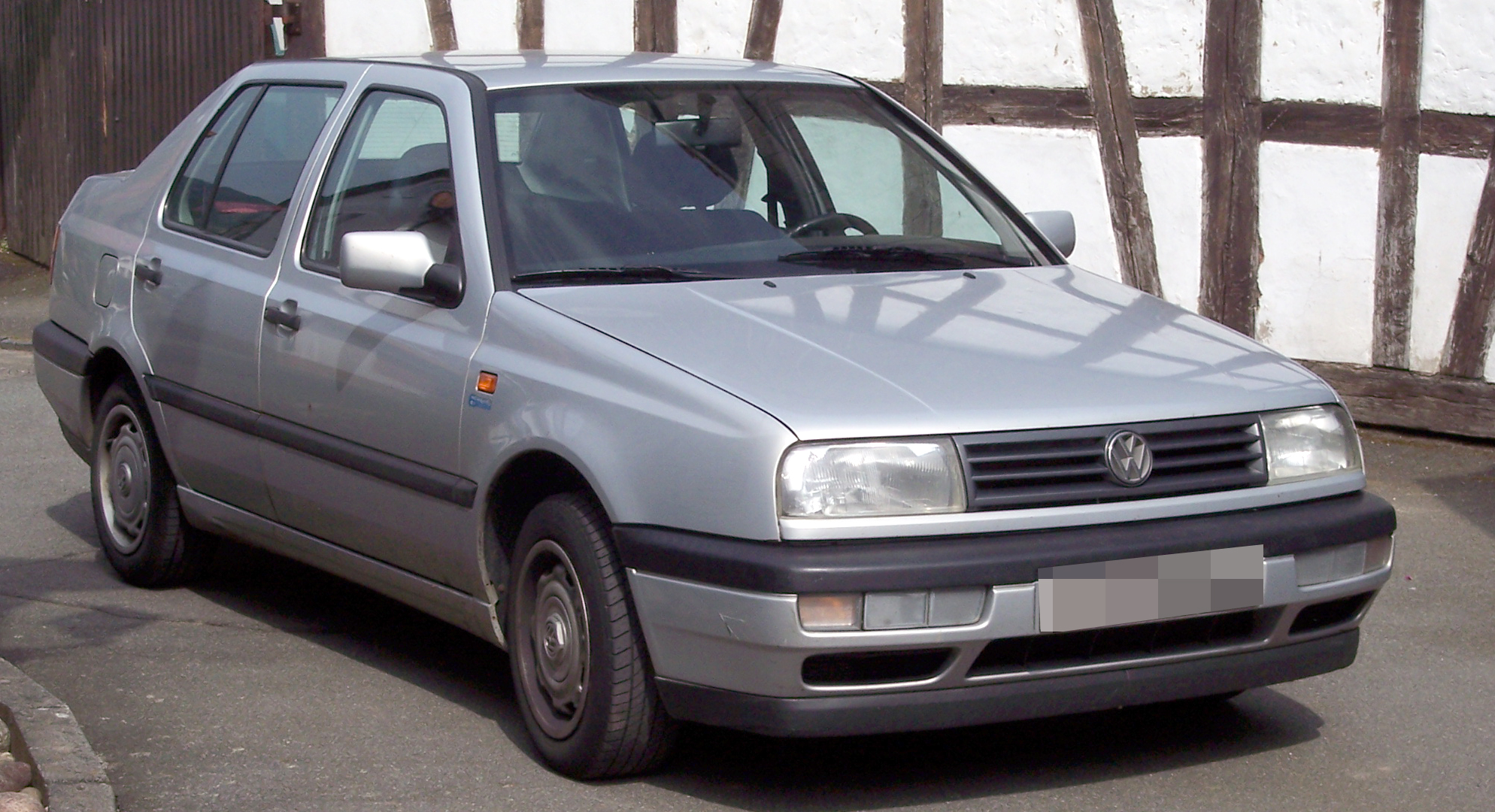
Volkswagen Vento (A3) (1992–1999)

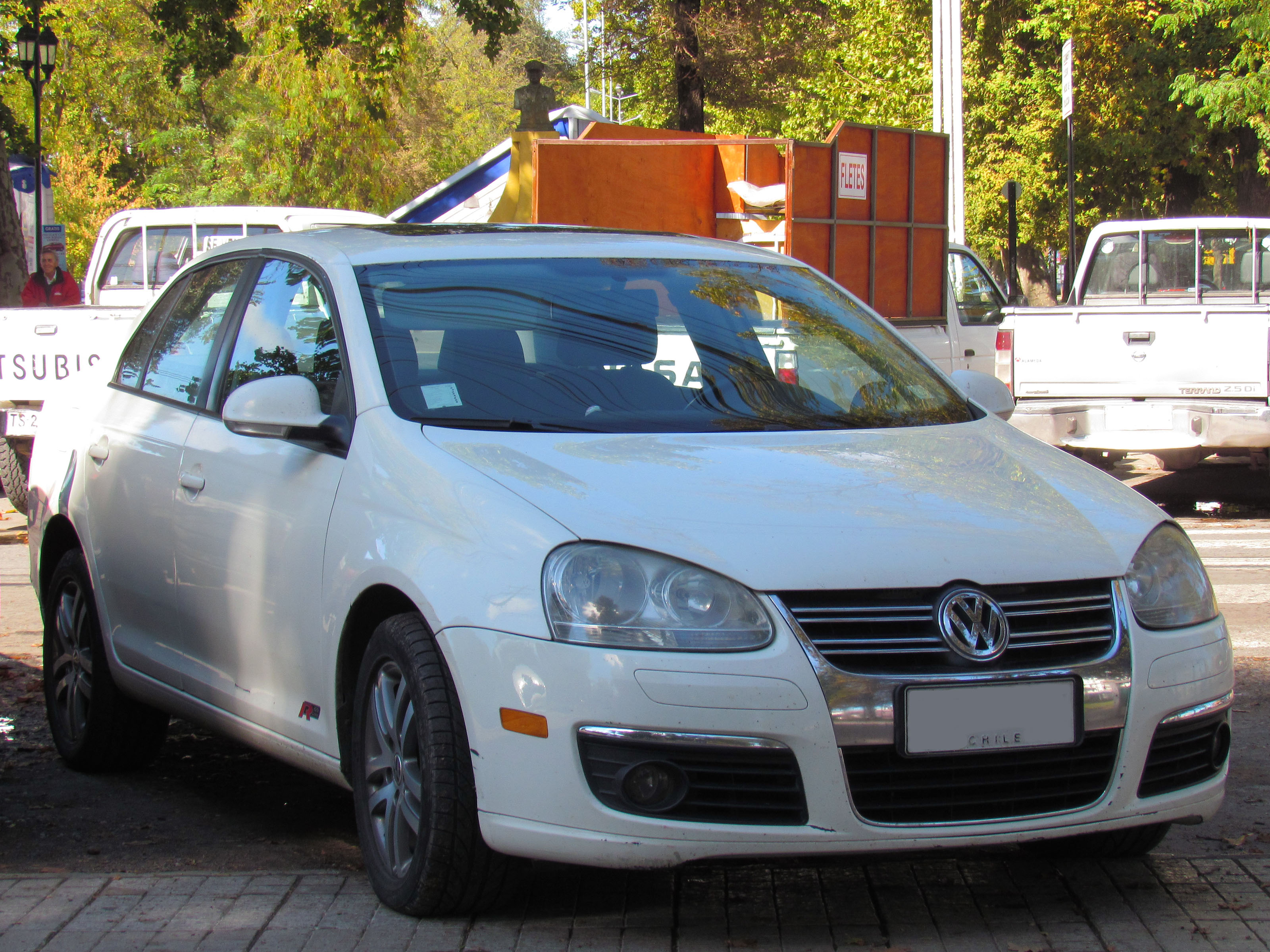
Volkswagen Jetta (A5) (2005–2011)

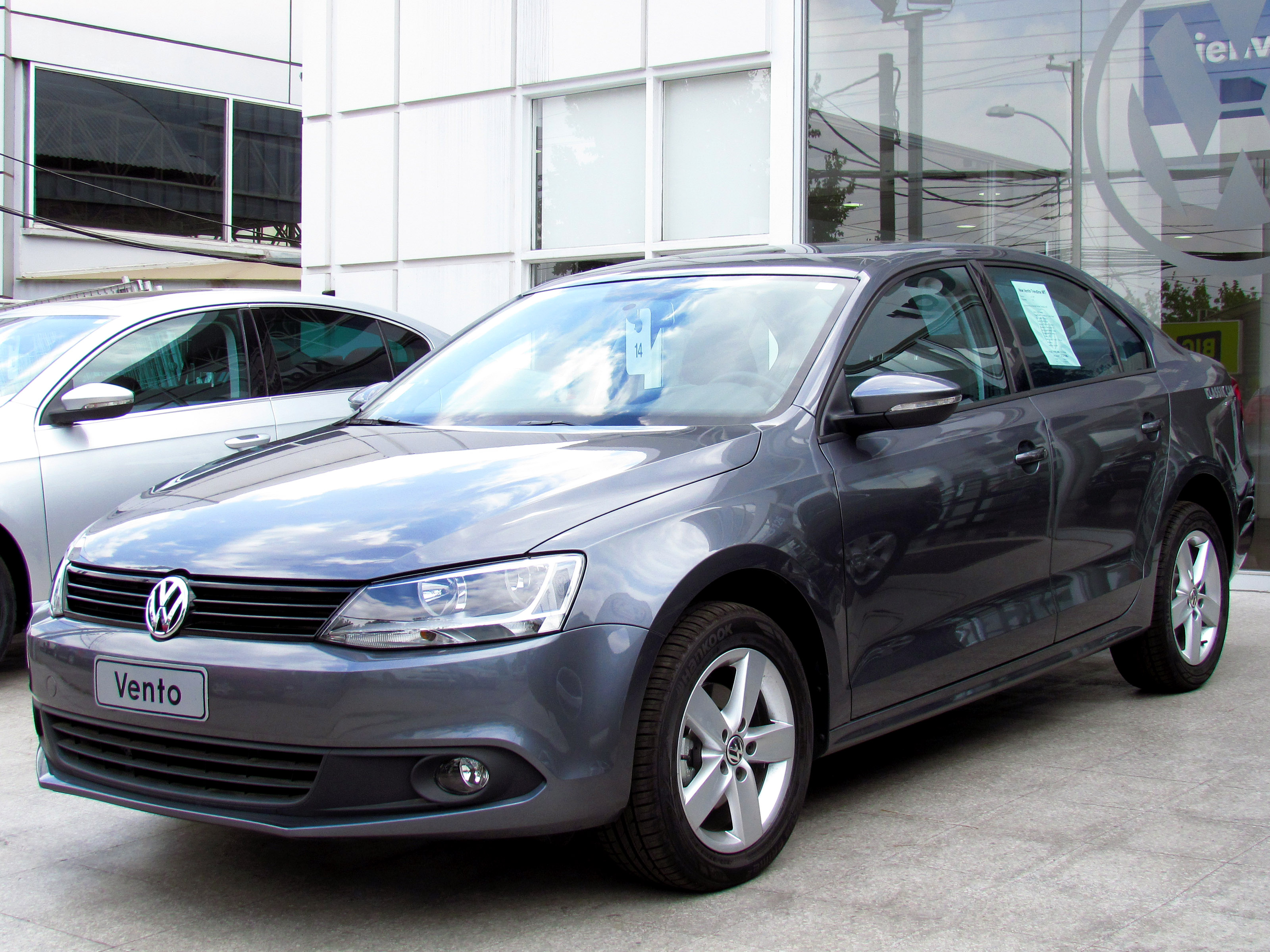
Volkswagen Jetta (A6) (2011–2018)

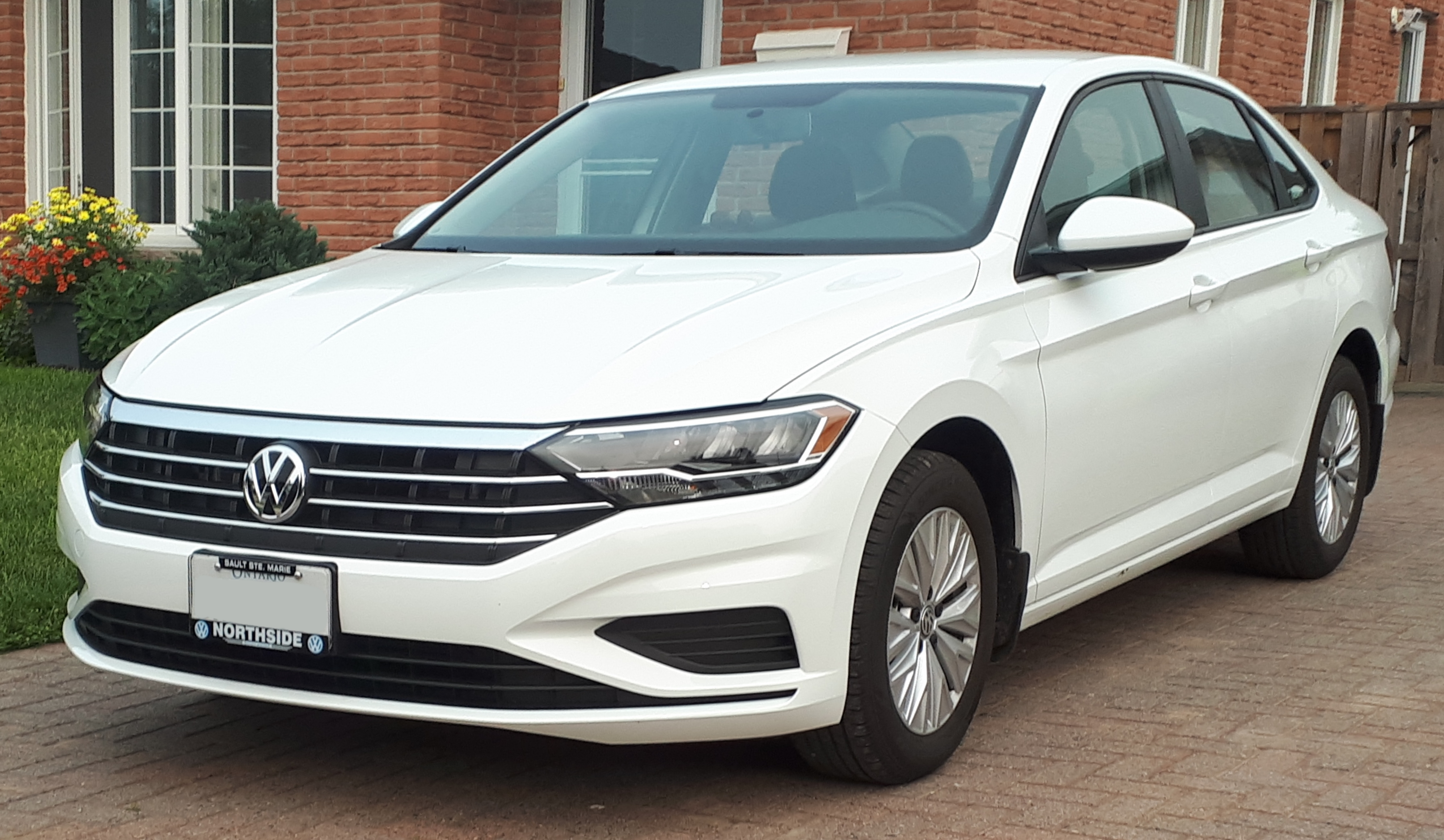
Volkswagen Jetta (A7) (2018–present)

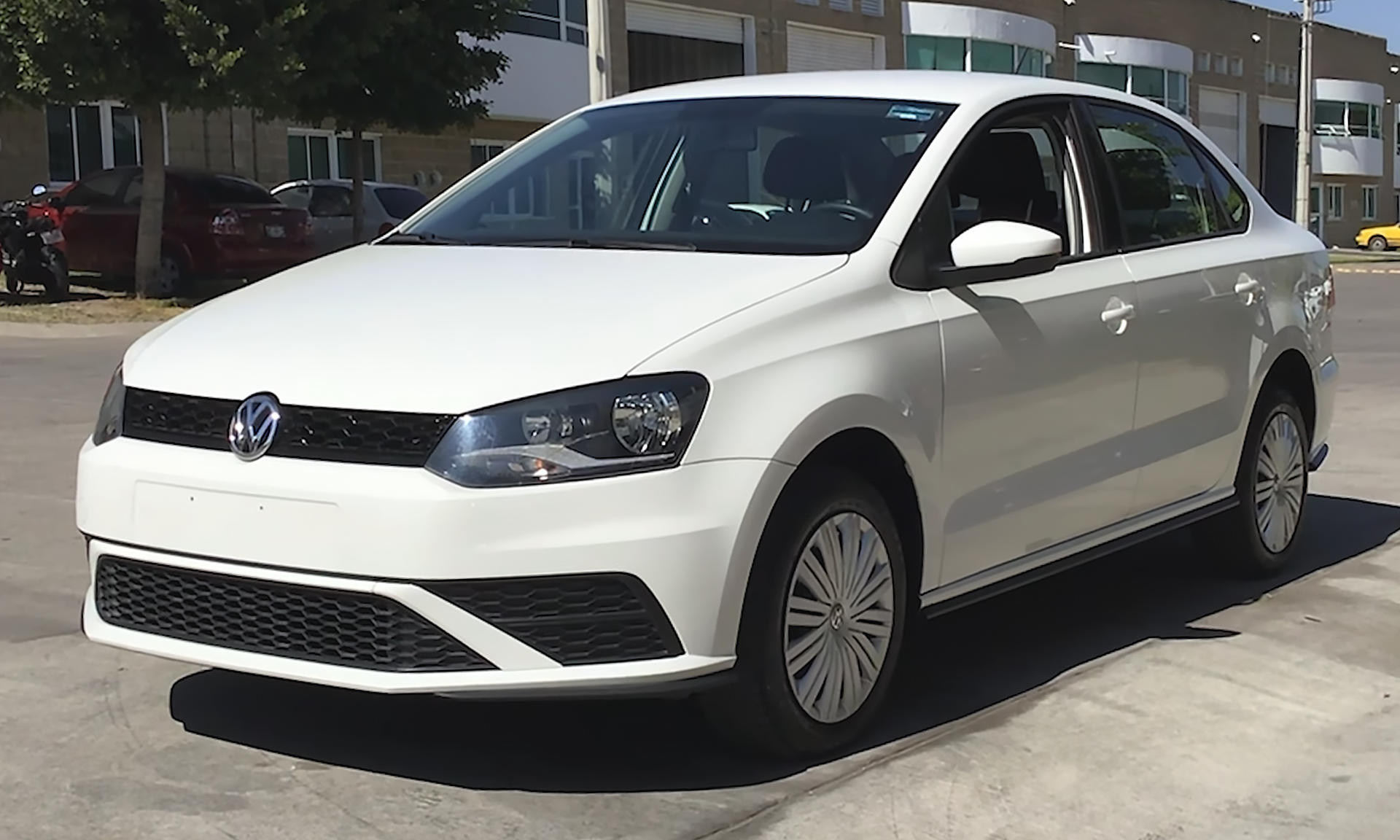
Volkswagen Vento (A05) (2010–2022)
