= Volkswagen New Compact Coupé =

New Compact Coupé
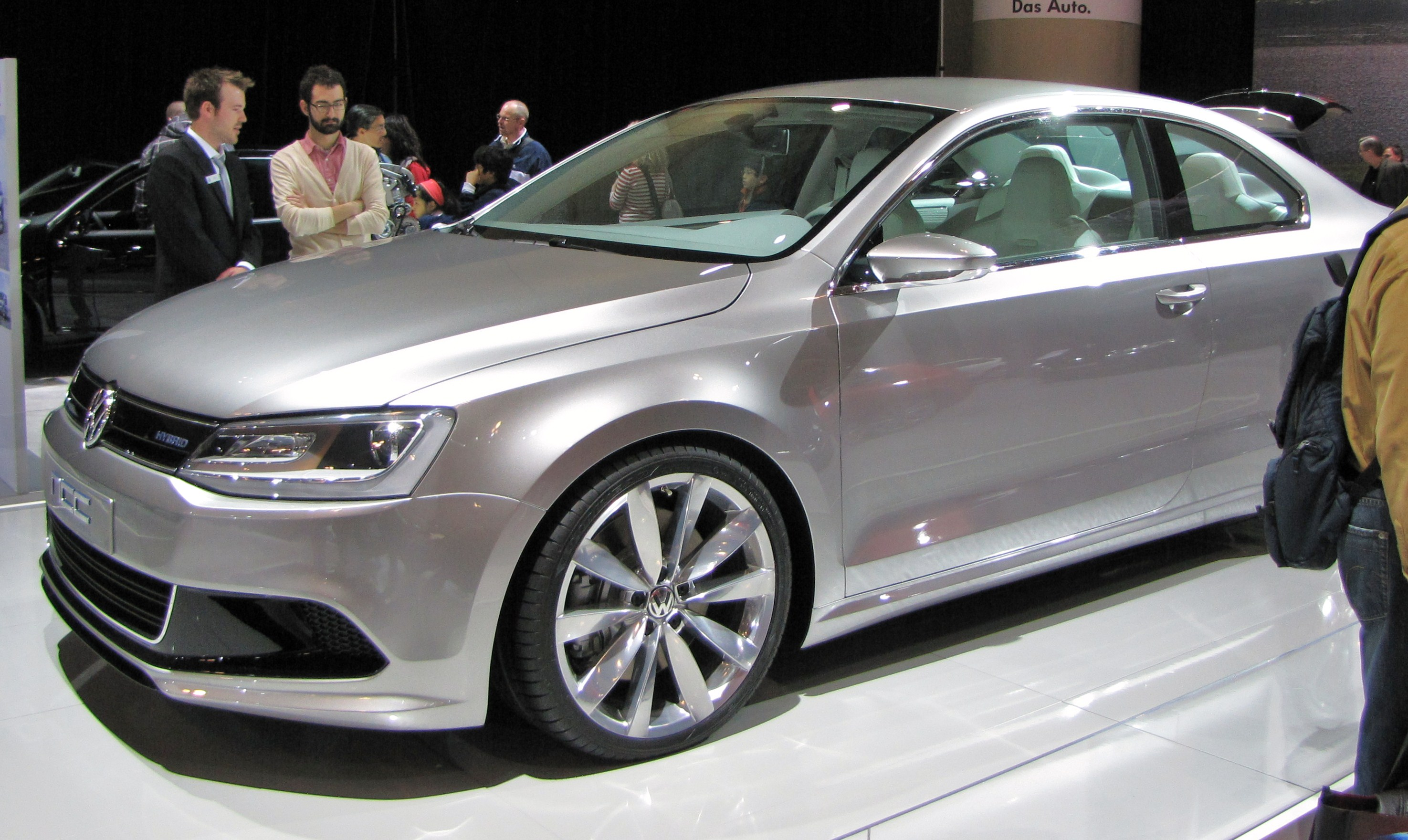

Overview
- Manufacturer: Volkswagen
- Production: 2010
- Designer: Klaus Bischoff

Body and chassis
- Class: Concept compact car
- Body style: 2-door coupé
- Layout: FF layout
- Related: Volkswagen Jetta (A6)

Powertrain
- Engine: hybrid-drive: 1,4-l-TSI-internal combustion engine 110 kW (150 hp) electric motor 20 kW (27 hp)
- Transmission: 7-Gear Direct-Shift Gearbox

Dimensions
- Wheelbase: 2,650 mm (104.3 in)
- Length: 4,540 mm (178.7 in)
- Width: 1,780 mm (70.1 in)
- Height: 1,410 mm (55.5 in)

The Volkswagen New Compact Coupé (short Volkswagen NCC) is a close to production concept car of the German car manufacturer Volkswagen. The car was presented on the NAIAS 2010 in Detroit. It is equipped with a hybrid drive, and is positioned between the Volkswagen Scirocco and the Volkswagen Passat CC.

The average fuel consumption is just 4.2 litres per 100 kilometers; the emission value is 98 grams of CO_{2} per kilometer. In contrast, the driving values are a top speed of 227 km/h and a sprint time of 8.6 seconds from 0 to 100 km/h.

The body of the vehicle is a resemblance of the 6th generation of the Volkswagen Jetta but as a 2-door style. This is also a reference to 2nd generation of the Volkswagen Jetta in which some of its models had 2-door options.

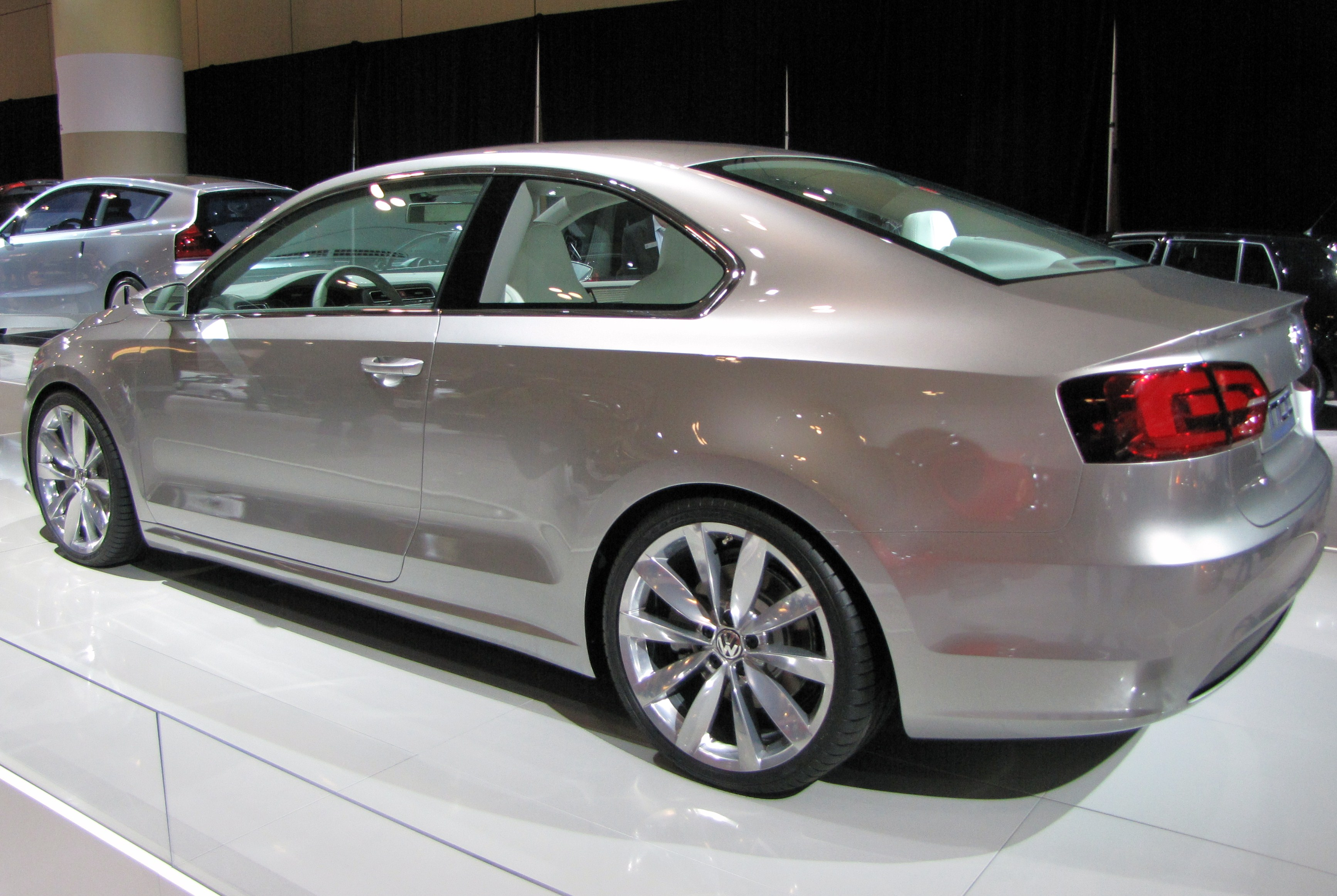
Volkswagen NCC at the 2010 Canadian International AutoShow

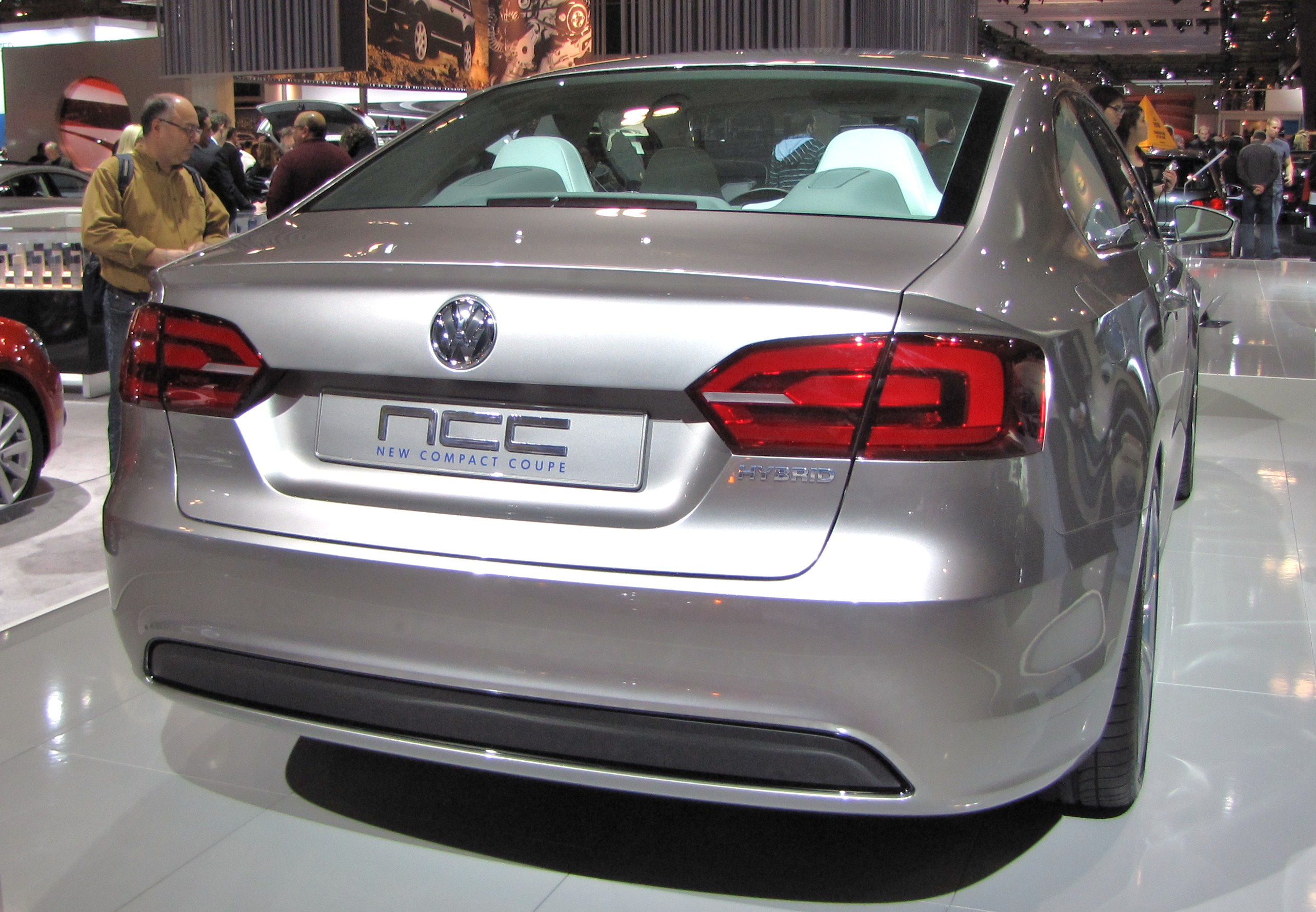
Volkswagen NCC at the 2010 Canadian International AutoShow
