= Volkswagen Jetta (A5) =

German compact car

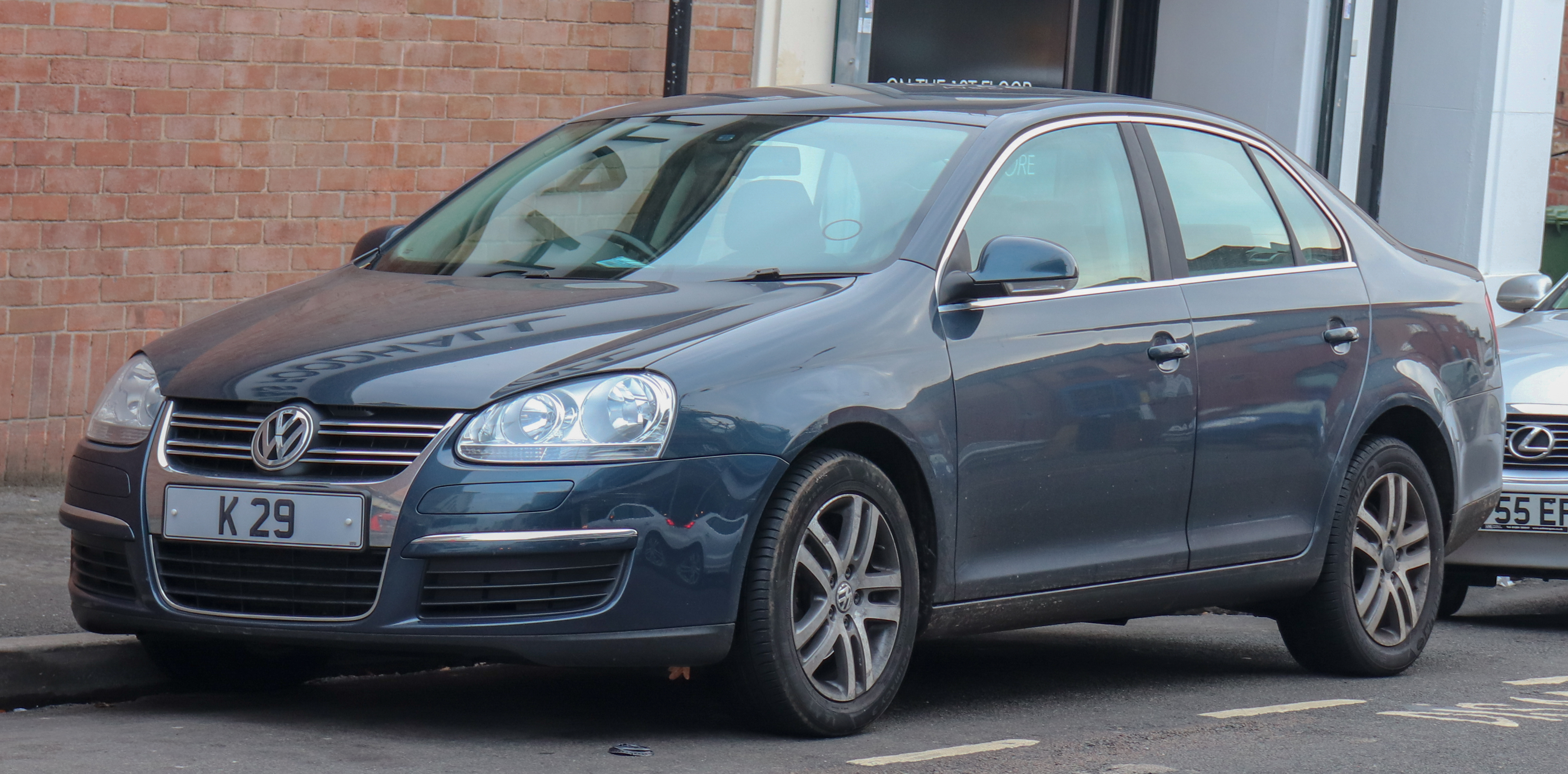

Overview
- Manufacturer: Volkswagen
- Model code: 1K
- Also called: Volkswagen Bora (Mexico and Colombia); Volkswagen GLI; Volkswagen Sagitar (China); Volkswagen Vento (Argentina, Chile, Paraguay and Uruguay)
- Production: August 2005–2010; 2006–2011 (China)
- Model years: 2006–2010 (up to 2011 in China)
- Assembly: Mexico: Puebla; China: Changchun (FAW-VW); South Africa: Uitenhage; Russia: Kaluga; India: Aurangabad (Volkswagen India)

Body and chassis
- Class: Compact car
- Body style: 4-door sedan 5-door station wagon (SportWagen)
- Layout: Front-engine, front-wheel-drive
- Platform: Volkswagen Group A5 (PQ35) platform
- Related: Volkswagen Golf Mk5; Audi A3 Mk2; SEAT León Mk2; SEAT Toledo Mk3; SEAT Altea; Škoda Octavia Mk2

Powertrain
- Engine: petrol: 1.4 L TSI I4; 1.6 L I4; 1.6 L FSI I4; 2.0 L I4; 2.0 L FSI I4; 2.0 L TFSI I4; 2.5 L I5; diesel: 1.6 L TDI CR I4; 1.9 L TDI PD I4; 2.0 L TDI PD I4; 2.0 L TDI CR I4
- Transmission: 5-speed manual (0A4); 6-speed manual (02Q); 6-speed automatic (09G); 6-speed automatic (DSG 02E); 7-speed automatic (DSG 0AM)

Dimensions
- Wheelbase: 2,580 mm (101.6 in)
- Length: 4,554 mm (179.3 in); Wagon: 179.4 in (4,557 mm)
- Width: 1,781 mm (70.1 in); 2010 Wagon: 70.1 in (1,781 mm)
- Height: 1,460 mm (57.5 in); Wagon: 59.2 in (1,504 mm)

Chronology
- Predecessor: Volkswagen Bora
- Successor: Volkswagen Jetta (A6)

The Volkswagen Jetta (A5 or Mk5, codename 1K) is a compact car, the fifth generation of the Volkswagen Jetta and the successor to the Volkswagen Bora which was manufactured by Volkswagen between 2005 and 2010, and up to 2011 in China. It is a three-box sedan derivative of the Golf Mk5. It was marketed as the Volkswagen Bora in Mexico and Colombia, Volkswagen Vento in Argentina, Chile and Uruguay, and Volkswagen Sagitar in China.

== Overview ==
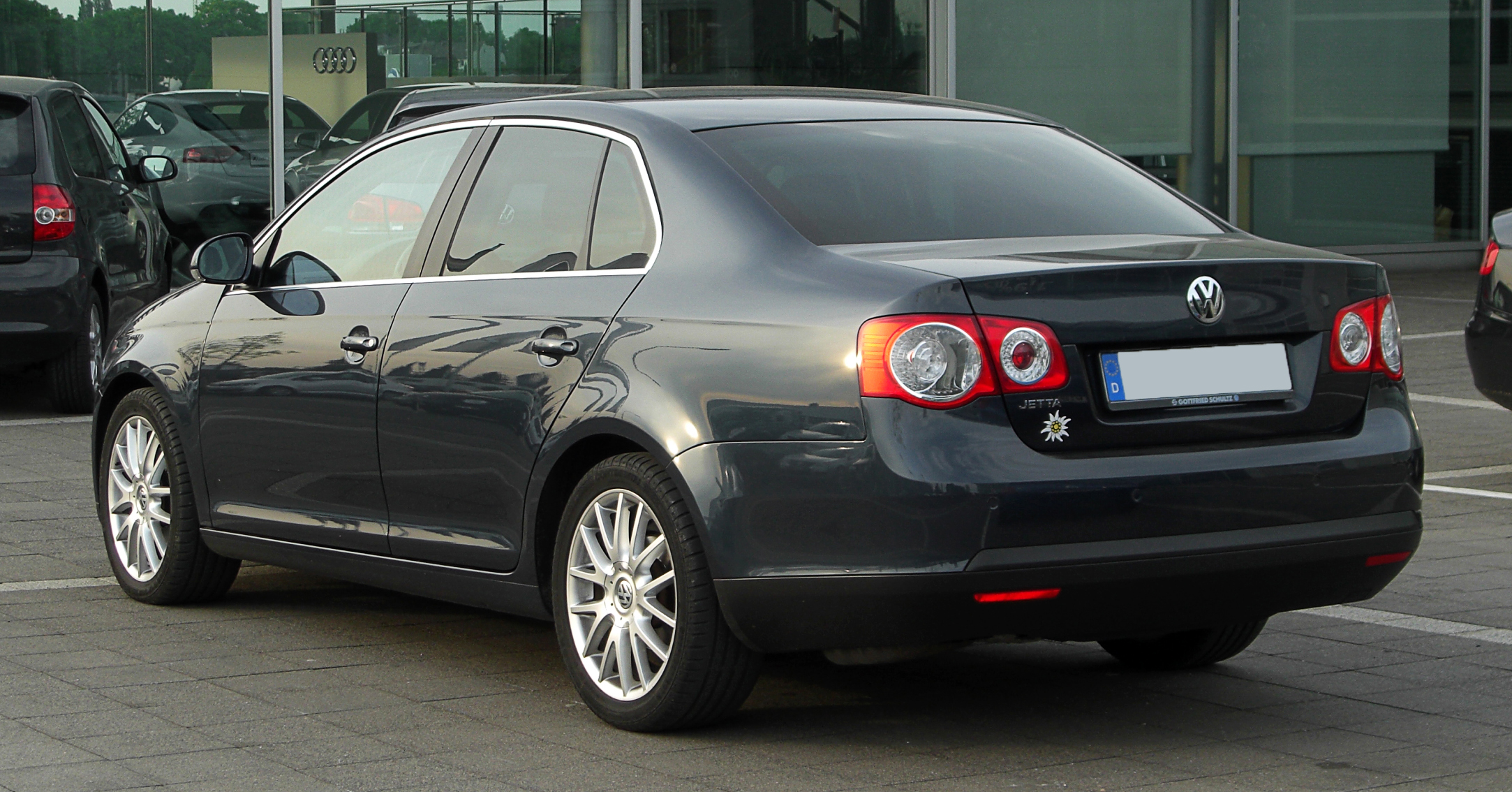
Rear view

The fifth generation debuted at the Los Angeles Auto Show on 5 January 2005. After the New Beetle, it was the second Volkswagen product to make its world debut at a US auto show. The Mk5 sedan went on sale in the US prior to any other country, reflecting the importance of the car in that market for Volkswagen. VW spent US$800 million to upgrade its Puebla facilities for this model's production. This included a US$290 million new engine production line for the 5-cylinder power plant, a US$50 million investment in the press shop, as well as a US$200 million purchase of 460 robots, which increased automation by 80%.

Although produced in the largest volumes in Mexico, final assembly of the car also takes place in China and South Africa for those respective markets. Like initial production of the second generation in China, the Asian and African plants build the car from a complete knock down (CKD) kit shipped from the factory in Puebla. Local assembly in Kaluga, Russia, started in early 2008. Assembly also began in India in 2008 at the Škoda factory in Aurangabad. As with the previously mentioned assembly plants, CKD kits from Volkswagen de México will be used.

The A5 Jetta is 170 millimetres (6.7 in) longer, 30 millimetres (1.2 in) wider, and has a 70 millimetres (2.8 in) longer wheelbase than the previous iteration. Interior room has increased from 2.46 to 2.58 cubic metres (87 to 91 ft^{3}). In particular, rear legroom was increased by 65 millimetres (2.6 in) over the fourth generation. Luggage compartment volume is up to 453 L (16 ft^{3}). One major change is the introduction of the first multi-link independent rear suspension in a Jetta. The design of the rear suspension resembles the one found in the Ford Focus. Volkswagen reportedly hired engineers from Ford who designed the suspension on the Focus.

Styling reflects a new direction for the Volkswagen brand, with a new chrome front grille, first seen on the Golf Mk5 R32, which was trickled down to other models. Some critics appreciated the new styling, whilst others dismissed it as just as bland as the 4th generation.

The 2006 model year TDI models used the 0A4 five-speed manual transmission. The 0A4 had the following gear ratios:

1st: 3.778	2nd: 2.063	3rd: 1.360	4th: .967	5th: .769	Final Drive 3.389

For model year 2009, certain markets saw a new base model internal combustion engine and automatic transmission. The previous 2.0-litre four-cylinder engine and six-speed automatic transmission were replaced with a smaller, more powerful, and more fuel efficient, 1.4-litre turbocharged four-cylinder engine and six-speed DSG transmission (the same as used in the new Golf Mk5). As a result of the change, fuel consumption has been improved (by 17% for the manual, from 8.2 L/100 km (34 mpg_{‑imp}; 29 mpg_{‑US}) down to 6.8 L/100 km (42 mpg_{‑imp}; 35 mpg_{‑US})), and 23% for the automatic, from 8.6 L/100 km (33 mpg_{‑imp}; 27 mpg_{‑US}) down to 6.6 L/100 km (43 mpg_{‑imp}; 36 mpg_{‑US}). Power increased 7% from 110 to 118 kW (148 to 158 hp; 150 to 160 PS), while torque is up 20%. In addition, acceleration times 0–100 km/h (0–62 mph) have improved, from 9.2 s to 8.5 s for the manual (an 8% improvement), and from 9.9 s to 8.5 s for the automatic (a 14% improvement).

== Features ==
The body of the fifth generation used high strength steel and laser welding with 35% of its body parts, resulting in double-digit increases in both dynamic and torsional rigidity. An impact-absorbing front bumper which yields slightly in the event of a collision with a pedestrian, reducing the chance of injury. A new door design allows just the outer panel to be removed and replaced if damaged, rather than the entire door. Safety features included side curtain airbags, seat-mounted rear side airbags, Electronic Stability Programme with Anti-Slip Regulation and Brake assist, as well as active head restraints. A Direct-Shift Gearbox (DSG) transmission, available dual-zone automatic climate control, and electro-mechanical power steering were also available.

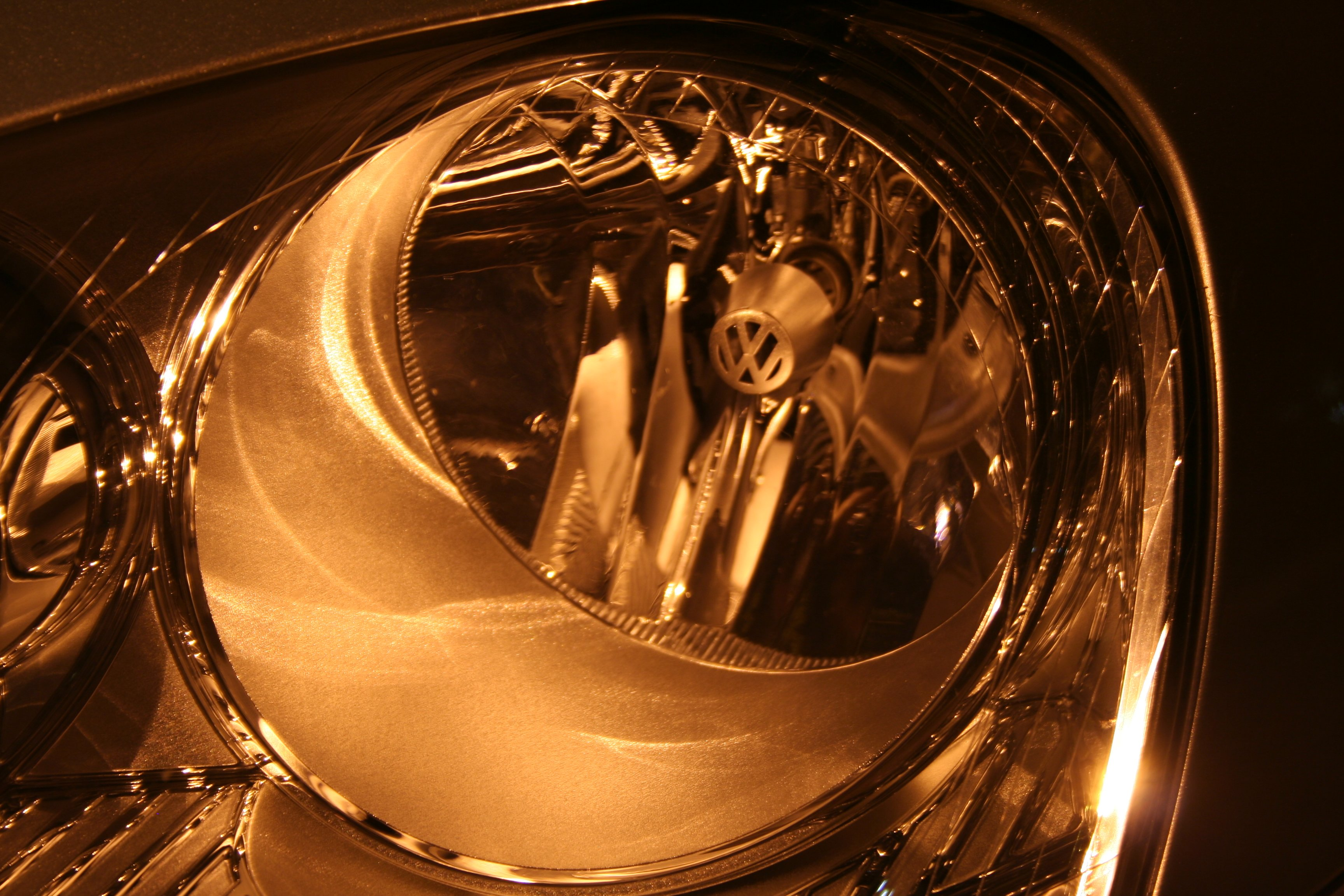
Halogen headlamp showing the bulb shield incorporating the VW logo

The fifth generation car features a redesigned electrical system. Control modules are used for various systems, digitally transmitted over Controller Area Network (CAN) buses at 500 kilobits per second — reducing the number of wires needed, and the opportunity for faults. Cars equipped with halogen headlamps have a 'VW' logo integrated into the bulb shield. In most markets, the rear lights use light-emitting diodes (LEDs). In North America, standard filament bulbs with a different design are used to comply with FMVSS 108.

Volkswagen has developed a very specific motor oil quality standard; oil meeting this standard must be used to ensure full warranty coverage.

== Engines ==
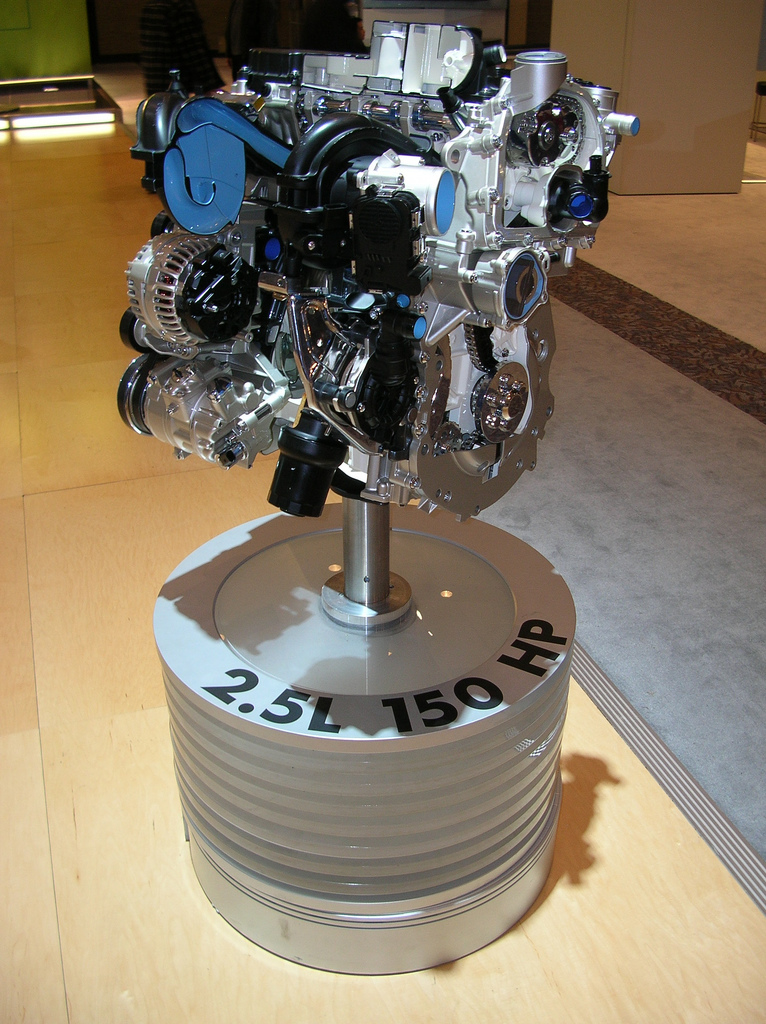
Volkswagen 2.5 L engine

The internal combustion engines available are dependent on the destination market. In Europe, a range of the new generation Fuel Stratified Injection (FSI) engines are available. Additionally in that market, the car can be had with an engine known as the 'Twincharger'. This 1.4 litre petrol engine combines turbo- and supercharging, to make a small but powerful engine with low fuel consumption. The Jetta available in the Americas and the Middle East is powered by a 2.5-litre 5-cylinder 20-valve engine in most trims. This engine shares its cylinder head design with the V10 engine found in the Lamborghini Gallardo and Audi R8.

When the Mark 5 Jetta was introduced, the Turbocharged Direct Injection (TDI) diesel engine was not offered in five US States due to the tight emission standards promulgated by the California Air Resources Board. In addition to California, four other states adopted the more stringent California standards. Where it was available, it fell into the least-restrictive emission category. That category was removed in 2007, prompting the diesel Jetta to be unavailable for more than a year until the introduction of a new common rail diesel engine, which appeared in August 2008. The introduction was delayed for approximately six months due to technical issues with the new emissions control system. The TDI Clean Diesel engine is rated 103 kilowatts (138 hp; 140 PS), and uses advanced features such as a diesel particulate filter and NOx-storage catalyst (vs. AdBlue) to reduce NO_{x} in order to qualify as a Tier II Bin 5 vehicle (equivalent to California's LEV II rating), and thereby allowing it to be sold in all 50 US states. AdBlue (urea injection fluid) is not required, further reducing maintenance requirements. In 2015 it was found that this engine's emissions had been falsified.

In the US, in August 2010, it was reported that the National Highway Traffic Safety Administration (NHTSA) was investigating 37,889 2009 Jetta TDI's regarding a stalling problem. There were complaints to the agency about the Jettas going into "limp-home" mode and then stalling almost immediately while being driven. Motor Trend reported that there were also complaints about premature failures of its high-pressure fuel pump.

== Safety ==
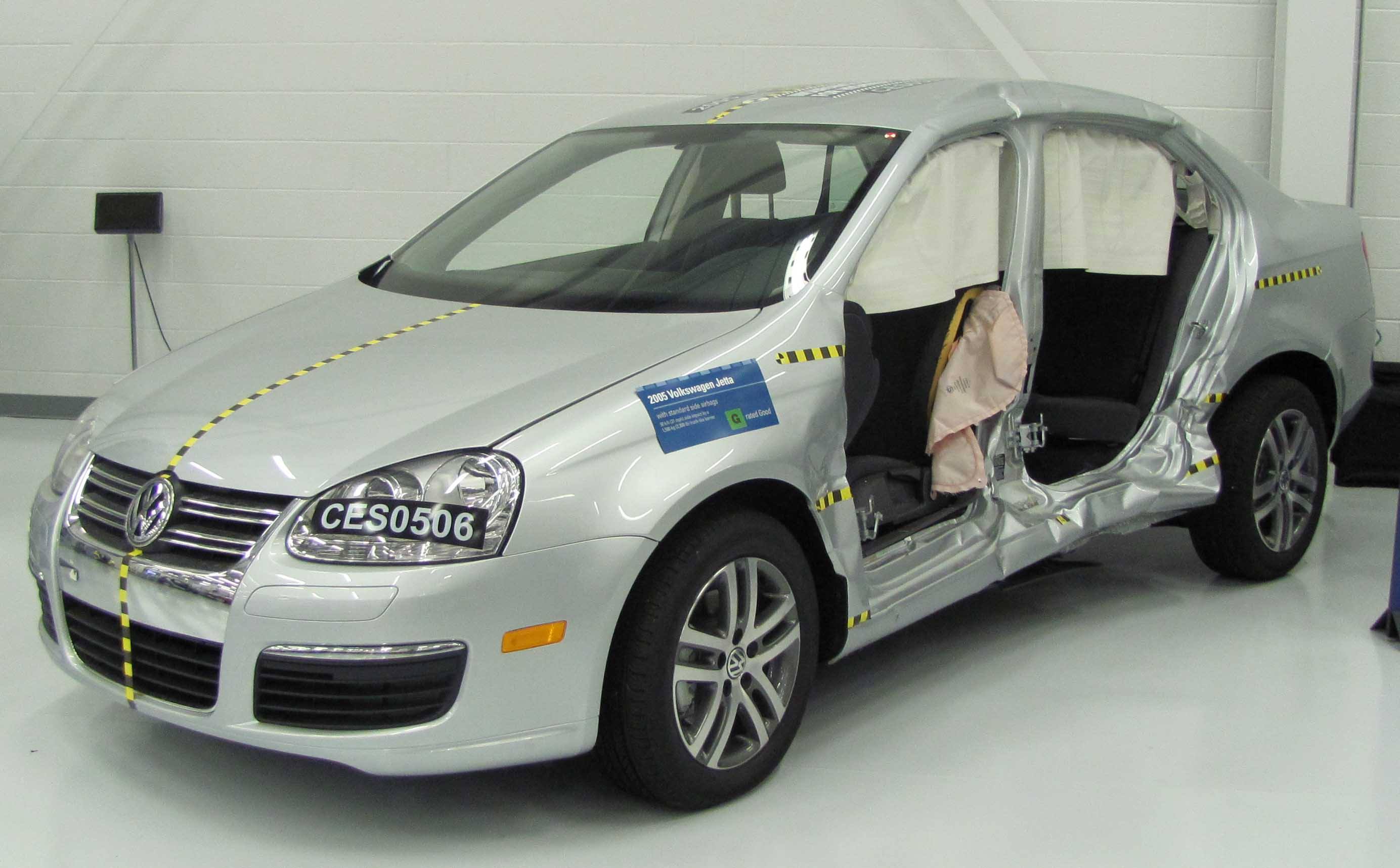
A 2005 Jetta crash-tested by the Insurance Institute for Highway Safety

In Insurance Institute for Highway Safety crash testing the Jetta received an overall "Good" rating in both front offset and side impact tests. In the side impact test the Jetta received "Good" marks in all nine measured categories. In 2005, the Institute noted that the side impact protection performance was the best they had ever rated. In 2006, the car received a "Top Safety Pick" award from the institute. The National Highway Traffic Safety Administration gave the fifth generation Jetta for both driver and passenger protection in a frontal impact, while the car received stars in a side impact crash test. To tout the safety of the car, a series of television commercials with the tag line "Safe happens" showed the car being involved in a collision whilst afterward the occupants are shown to have emerged unscathed.

The VW Jetta received the maximum 5 stars in the China NCAP crash tests.

== Testing and review ==
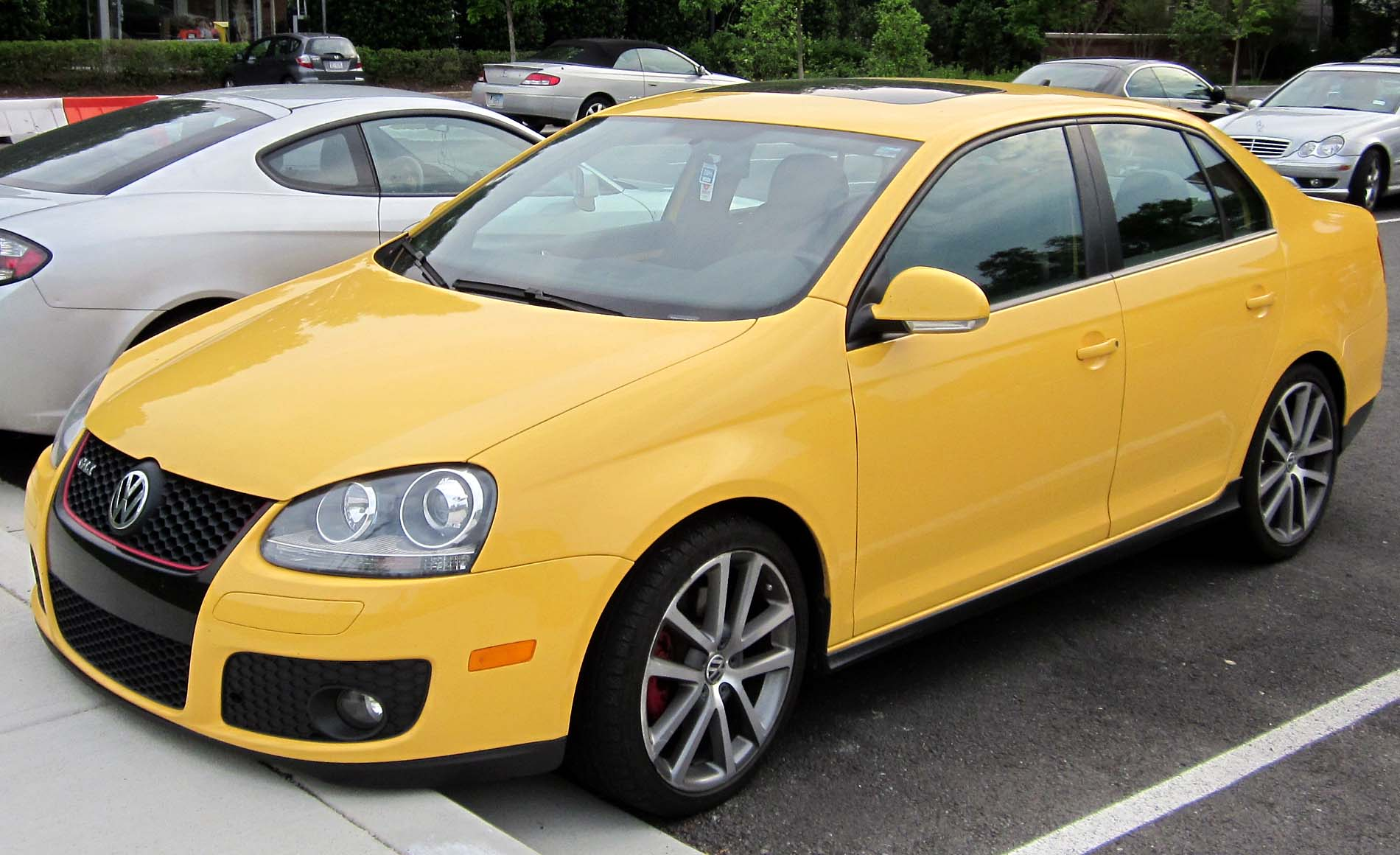
Volkswagen Jetta GLI Fahrenheit (US)

The fifth generation received generally positive reviews with some reviewers complaining the car lost some of its character with the redesign. Most reviewers found the ride to be firm and well controlled but not always as forgiving as the previous generation. Handling was a strong point, with quick and precise steering and minimal body roll due to the MacPherson Strut suspension up front. Fit and finish received excellent marks, with reviewers noting the car felt very upscale. The front seats were firm but well liked, and the rear seat was roomy, in contrast to the cramped quarters in the fourth generation. Controls and displays were decent, but fell apart and started shorting out with age. Reviewers were particularly impressed with the "Sportline" models (known as the GLI in North America). Equipped with sport seats, a firmer suspension lowered by 15 mm (0.59 in), and low profile tyres, critics praised the excellent handling that was an improvement over the already good performance on the standard model. Additionally, the 2.0 Turbo FSI engine also won commendation for its high power figures, smooth operation, and low fuel consumption. Along with its hatchback brethren, the fifth generation ranks among the top cars on the market in independent reviews of resale value.

Although improved over the fourth generation, the Mark 5 still took over 42 hours to assemble at the factory in Mexico. Part of this disparity is blamed on the switch to the more complex independent rear suspension. Volkswagen has publicly stated its discontent over the excessive assembly time, and pledged to streamline manufacturing in the next generation of A platform cars. In the interim, Volkswagen de México is making a concerted effort to further increase productivity at the plant by consulting outside experts from Toyota and other Japanese companies. By implementing many lean manufacturing principles and techniques, a goal has been set to increase productivity levels at the factory by 30% or more in the coming years.

== Engine specifications ==
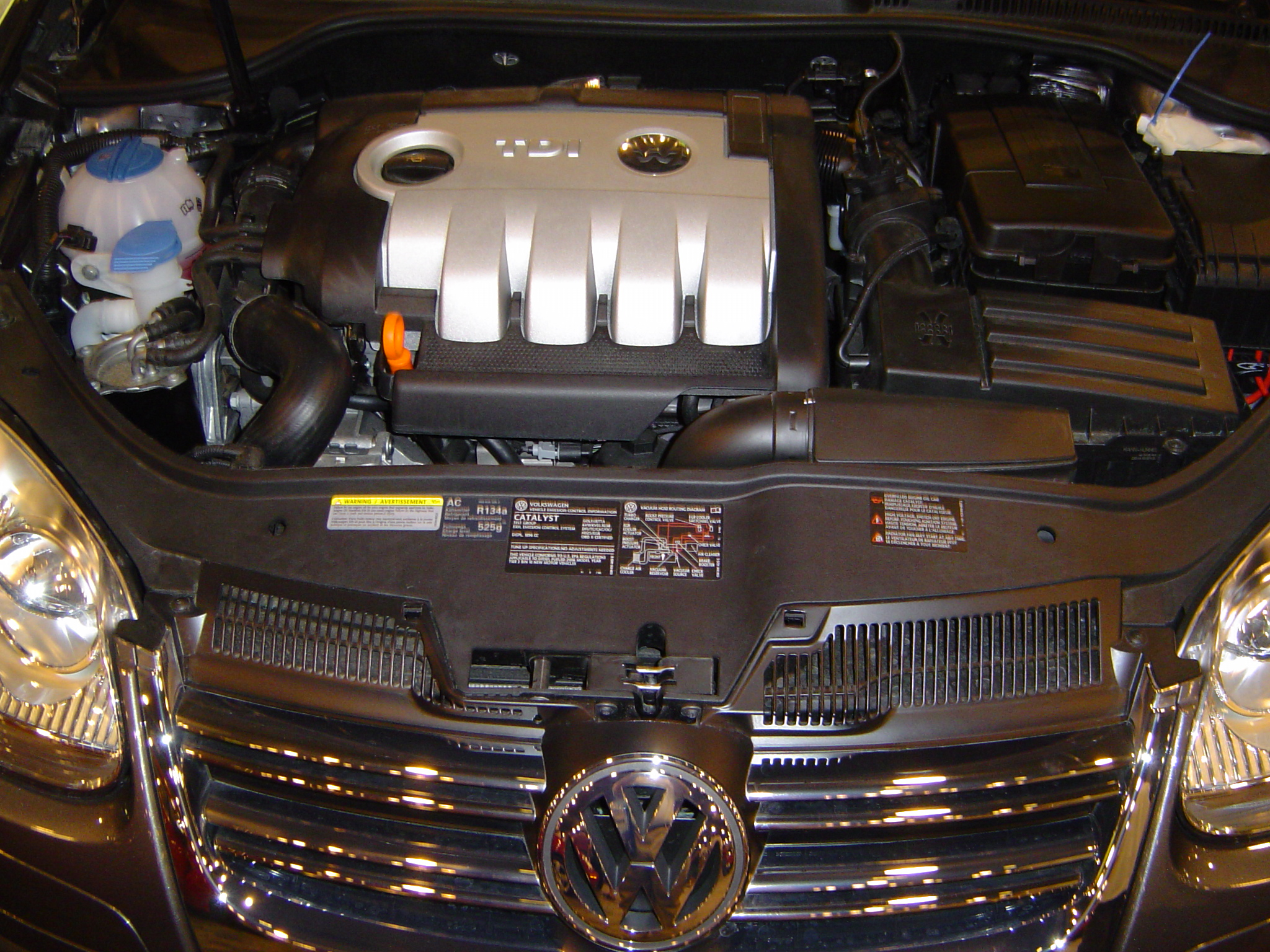
VW engine in Jetta 2.0 TDI (PD) DPF

Model	Years	Engine and code		Displ.	Power	Torque	Top Speed
Petrol engines
1.6	2005–2010	I4 8V	BSE/BSF	1,595 cc (97.3 cu in)	75 kW (101 hp; 102 PS) @ 5,600 rpm	148 N⋅m (109 lb⋅ft) @ 3,800 rpm	186 km/h (116 mph)
1.6 FSI	2005–2007	I4 16V	BLF	1,598 cc (97.5 cu in)	85 kW (114 hp; 116 PS) @ 6,000 rpm	155 N⋅m (114 lb⋅ft) @ 4,000 rpm	194 km/h (121 mph)
1.4 TSI	2007–2010	I4 16V	CAXA	1,390 cc (85 cu in)	90 kW (121 hp; 122 PS) @ 5,000 rpm	200 N⋅m (148 lb⋅ft) @ 1,500–4,000 rpm	
1.4 TSI	2006–2008	I4 16V	BMY	1,390 cc (85 cu in)	103 kW (138 hp; 140 PS) @ 5,600 rpm	220 N⋅m (162 lb⋅ft) @ 1,500–4,000 rpm	207 km/h (129 mph)
2.0 FSI	2005–2010	I4 16V	BLR/BVY	1,984 cc (121.1 cu in)	110 kW (148 hp; 150 PS) @ 6,000 rpm	200 N⋅m (148 lb⋅ft) @ 3,500 rpm	211 km/h (131 mph)
2.5	2005–2007	I5 20V	BGP/BGQ/BPR/BPS	2,480 cc (151 cu in)	110 kW (148 hp; 150 PS) @ 5,000 rpm	228 N⋅m (168 lb⋅ft) @ 3,750 rpm	
1.4 TSI	2008–2010	I4 16V	CAVD	1,390 cc (85 cu in)	118 kW (158 hp; 160 PS) @ 5,800 rpm	240 N⋅m (177 lb⋅ft) @ 1,500–4,500 rpm	
1.4 TSI	2006–2008	I4 16V	BLG	1,390 cc (85 cu in)	125 kW (168 hp; 170 PS) @ 6,000 rpm	240 N⋅m (177 lb⋅ft) @ 1,500–4,750 rpm	222 km/h (138 mph)
2.5	2008–2010	I5 20V	CBT/CBU	2,480 cc (151 cu in)	125 kW (168 hp; 170 PS) @ 5,700 rpm	240 N⋅m (177 lb⋅ft) @ 4,250 rpm	
2.0 TFSI	2005–2008	I4 16V	BWA	1,984 cc (121.1 cu in)	147 kW (197 hp; 200 PS) @ 5,100–6,000 rpm	280 N⋅m (207 lb⋅ft) @ 1,800–5,000 rpm	235 km/h (146 mph)
2.0 TSI	2008–2010	I4 16V	CAWB	1,984 cc (121.1 cu in)	147 kW (197 hp; 200 PS) @ 5,100–6,000 rpm	280 N⋅m (207 lb⋅ft) @ 1,700–5,000 rpm	
Diesel engines
1.6 TDI (CR) DPF	2009–2010	I4 16V	CAYC	1,598 cc (97.5 cu in)	77 kW (103 hp; 105 PS) @ 4,400 rpm	250 N⋅m (184 lb⋅ft) @ 1,500–2,500 rpm	
1.9 TDI (PD)	2005–2009	I4 8V	BKC/BXE/BLS	1,896 cc (115.7 cu in)	77 kW (103 hp; 105 PS) @ 4,000 rpm	250 N⋅m (184 lb⋅ft) @ 1,900 rpm	189 km/h (117 mph)
2.0 TDI (PD)	2005–2008	I4 16V	AZV	1,968 cc (120.1 cu in)	100 kW (134 hp; 136 PS) @ 4,000 rpm	320 N⋅m (236 lb⋅ft) @ 1,750–2,500 rpm	205 km/h (127 mph)
2.0 TDI (PD)	2005–2008	I4 16V	BKD	1,968 cc (120.1 cu in)	103 kW (138 hp; 140 PS) @ 4,000 rpm	320 N⋅m (236 lb⋅ft) @ 1,750–2,500 rpm	207 km/h (129 mph)
2.0 TDI (PD) DPF	2005–2008	I4 8V	BMM	1,968 cc (120.1 cu in)	103 kW (138 hp; 140 PS) @ 4,000 rpm	320 N⋅m (236 lb⋅ft) @ 1,800–2,500 rpm	207 km/h (129 mph)
2.0 TDI (CR) DPF	2008–2010	I4 16V	CBDB	1,968 cc (120.1 cu in)	103 kW (138 hp; 140 PS) @ 4,000 rpm	320 N⋅m (236 lb⋅ft) @ 1,750–2,500 rpm	207 km/h (129 mph)
2.0 TDI (PD) DPF	2006–2008	I4 16V	BMN	1,968 cc (120.1 cu in)	125 kW (168 hp; 170 PS) @ 4,200 rpm	350 N⋅m (258 lb⋅ft) @ 1,750–2,500 rpm	222 km/h (138 mph)
2.0 TDI (CR) DPF	2008–2010	I4 16V	CBBB	1,968 cc (120.1 cu in)	125 kW (168 hp; 170 PS) @ 4,200 rpm	350 N⋅m (258 lb⋅ft) @ 1,750–2,500 rpm	222 km/h (138 mph)

== Golf Variant/Jetta SportWagen ==
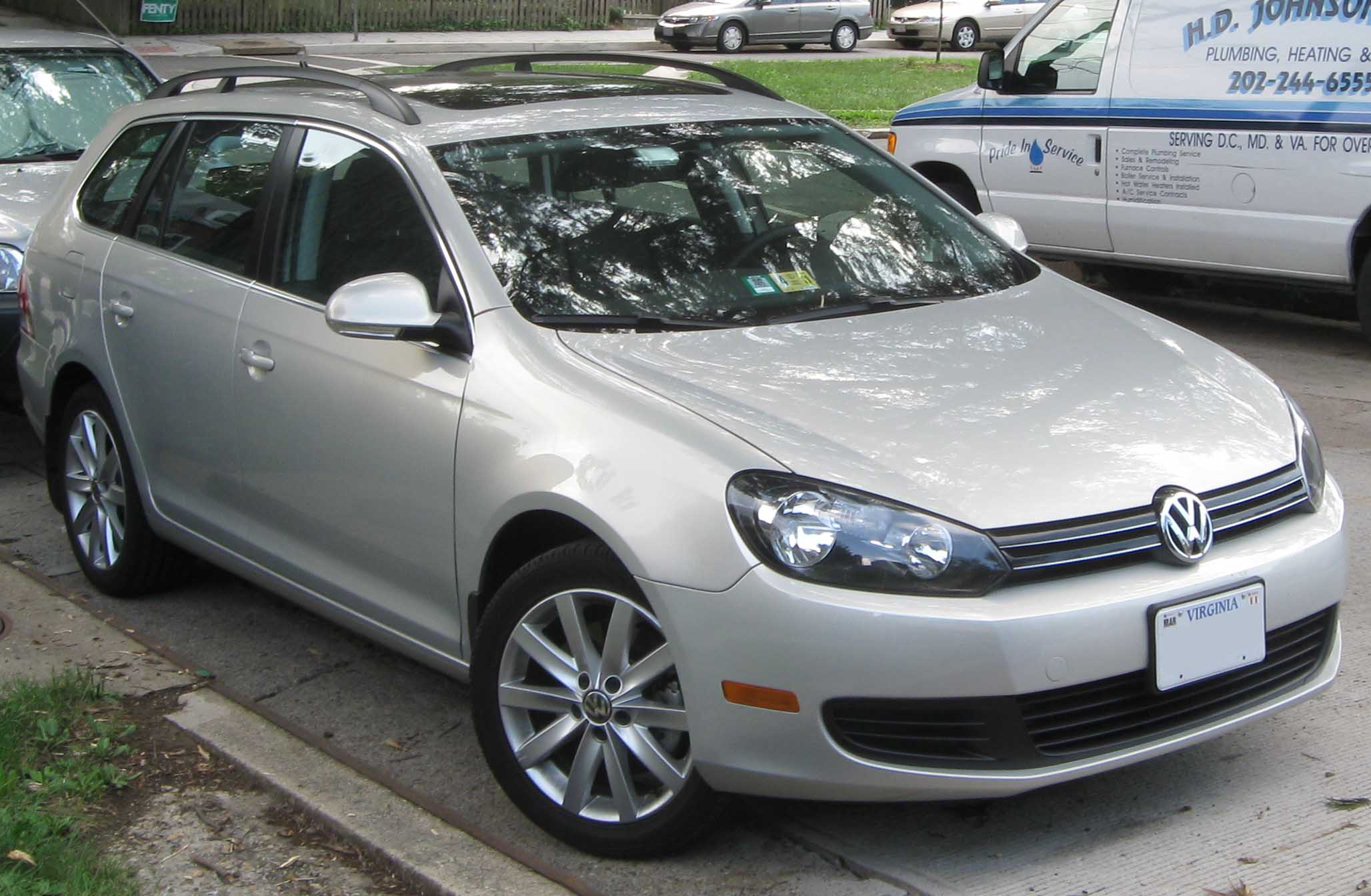
2010 Volkswagen Jetta TDI Sportwagen (US)

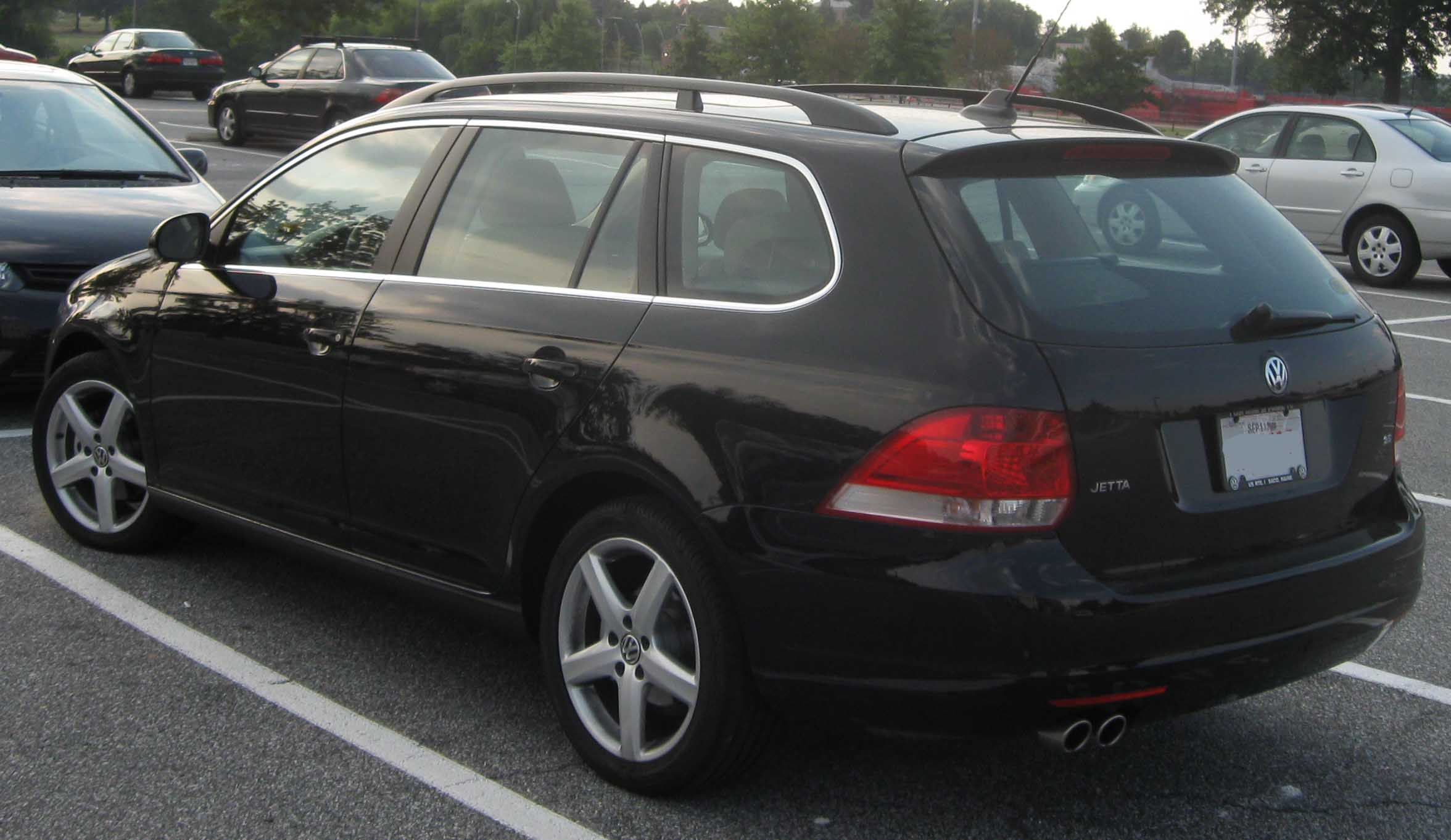
2009 Volkswagen Jetta SportWagen

Volkswagen debuted a station wagon variant of the Golf at the 2007 New York International Auto Show, with a cargo volume of 930 and 1,894 litres (32.8 and 66.9 ft^{3}) (rear seats up/down) and an optional 1.18 square metres (12.7 ft^{2}) panoramic sunroof.

VW marketed the station wagon as the Jetta SportWagen in the United States, Bora Sportwagen in Mexico, Golf Break and later Golf SW in France, Jetta Variant in Brazil, Vento Variant in Argentina, Jetta Wagon in Canada (2009 only), Golf Wagon in Canada (2010 onwards), Golf Estate in the United Kingdom and Golf Variant in the German domestic and most other markets.

In 2010, the Sportwagen received a minor interior and exterior facelift, and remained based on the fifth-generation Golf, with front end styling mirroring the sixth-generation Golf.

== 2010 Jetta TDI Cup "Street" edition ==
This version commemorated the 2008+ Jetta TDI Cup Race series, the last year of the Mk V, and was based on the TDI Clean Diesel sedan. The same 104 kW (139 hp; 141 PS) and 240 lb⋅ft (325 N⋅m) of torque diesel motor was supplied, and the package included GLI brakes, suspension, and sway bars. Additional upgrades from the base TDI were "TDI Cup Edition" body side stickers, 18 inch wheels with Pirelli P-Zero or Yokohama ADVAN 225/40R18 sport tires, aluminum pedals, leather-wrapped steering wheel, chrome door linings, aerodynamic body kit (front, side & rear), an Interlagos cloth interior with heated sport seats, short shifter, faux carbon fiber inlays (as opposed to metallic), and a black interior (headliner/doorcards/dash).

It could be purchased with either a 6-speed Manual or DSG transmission (DSG includes paddle shifters), and a "Thunderbunny" body kit was optional (and available from VW only on the Cup edition).

The vehicle was unveiled in the 2008 SEMA Show. The production version went on sale in January 2010 with a base MSRP of US$24,990 (not including destination fee or options).

Per VW North America, worldwide only 1,501 Jetta TDI Cup Editions were produced. 588 were manufactured with a manual transmission and 913 were built with DSG transmissions.
