= Volkswagen Jetta (A6) =

Sixth generation of Volkswagen Jetta

- 2013 Volkswagen Jetta GLI

Overview
- Manufacturer: Volkswagen
- Model code: Typ 1B
- Also called: Volkswagen Sagitar (China); Volkswagen Vento (Argentina, Chile, Paraguay and Uruguay); Pyeonghwa Zunma 1606 (North Korea)
- Production: 2010–2019 (Mexico); 2012–2019 (China); 2013–2018 (Russia)
- Model years: 2011–2018 (North America)
- Assembly: Mexico: Puebla (Volkswagen de México); Russia: Nizhny Novgorod (GAZ); China: Chengdu (FAW-VW); Malaysia: Pekan (HICOM); Brazil: São Bernardo do Campo; India: Chakan (VW India)

Body and chassis
- Class: Compact car
- Body style: 4-door sedan
- Layout: Front-engine, front-wheel-drive
- Platform: Volkswagen Group A5 (PQ35)
- Related: Volkswagen Golf Mk6

Powertrain
- Engine: Petrol: 1.2 L TSI I4; 1.4 L TSI I4; 1.6 L MPI I4; 1.8 L TSI I4; 2.0 L MPI I4; 2.0 L TSI I4; 2.5 L MPI I5; Petrol hybrid: 1.4 L TSI I4; Diesel: 1.6 L TDI I4; 2.0 L TDI I4
- Transmission: 5-speed manual 6-speed manual 6-speed DSG; 7-speed 0AM DSG

Dimensions
- Wheelbase: 2,650 mm (104.3 in); 2,655 mm (104.5 in) (hybrid)
- Length: 4,628–4,644 mm (182.2–182.8 in)
- Width: 1,778 mm (70.0 in)
- Height: 1,453–1,482 mm (57.2–58.3 in)
- Curb weight: 1,302–1,455 kg (2,870.4–3,207.7 lb)

Chronology
- Predecessor: Volkswagen Jetta (A5)
- Successor: Volkswagen Jetta (A7)

The Volkswagen Jetta (A6) is a compact car, the sixth generation of the Volkswagen Jetta and the successor to the Jetta (A5). Known as the NCS (New Compact Sedan) during its development, it was released in 2010 and was phased out since 2018 to make way for the Jetta (A7). The A6 Jetta is notable for leaving the premium positioning in the compact car segment, a strategy employed by Volkswagen to increase volume in the North American market. It also marked the departure from being a sedan derivative of the Golf, opting for a dedicated bodywork instead.

== Overview ==
Rear view

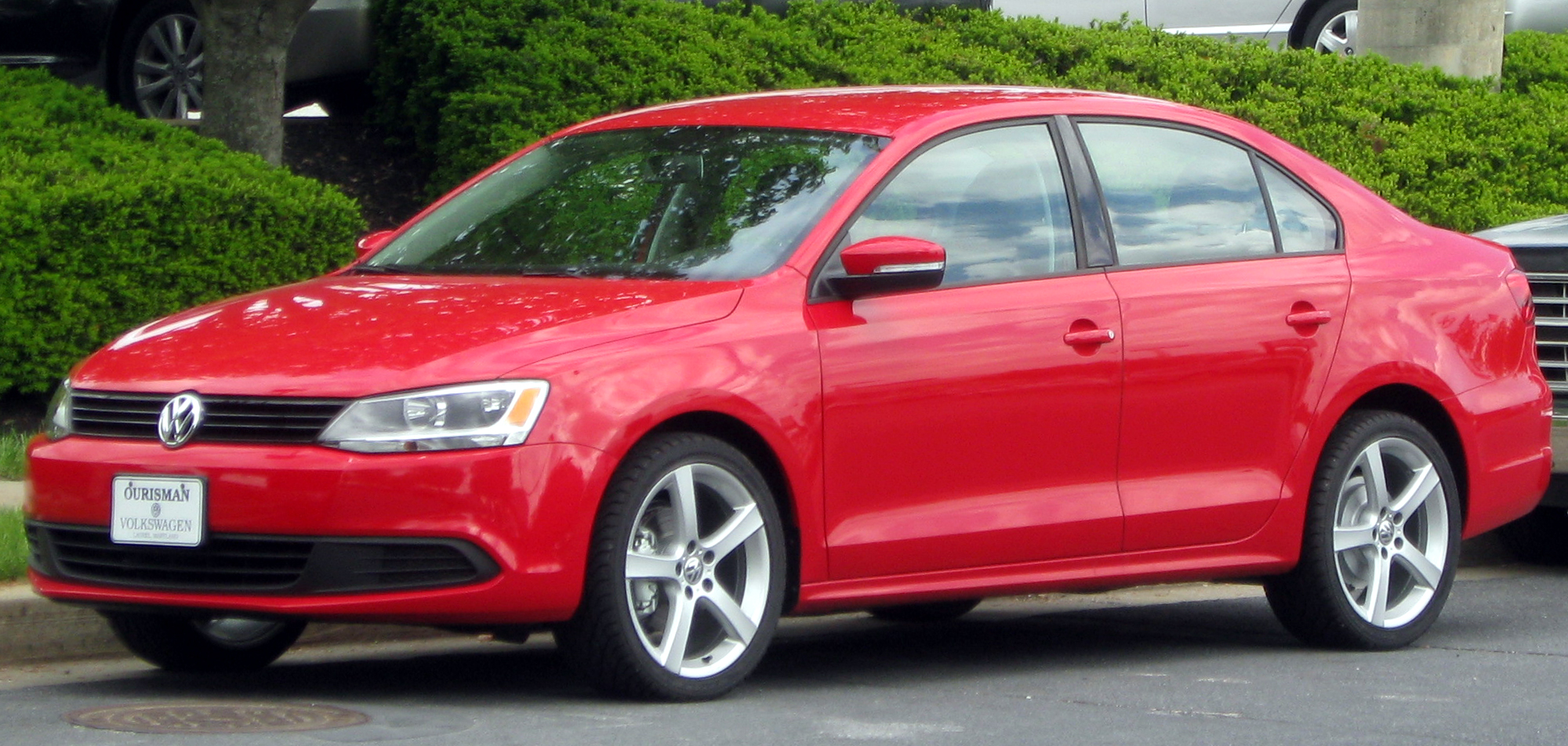
Volkswagen Jetta SE (US)

The sixth-generation Volkswagen Jetta was announced in the North American market on 16 June 2010. The new model was larger and less expensive to manufacture than the previous generation making the vehicle more competitive against rivals such as the Toyota Corolla, Honda Civic and Nissan Sentra as part of Volkswagen's goal of reaching sales of 800,000 units in the North American market by 2018. The vehicle is produced at Volkswagen's facility in Puebla, Mexico, and was primarily designed by Volkswagen Mexico under the supervision of Volkswagen Germany with 70 percent of the parts designed and manufactured in Mexico. Although the Jetta no longer shares any body panels with the Golf and has a longer wheelbase, this generation was partly based on the same PQ35 platform (slight adaptation of the Golf front axle, newly developed twist beam rear axle). This new generation has a drag coefficient of 0.30.

Volkswagen's target of increasing its North American sales removed the Jetta from the premium compact car market. This forced many cost-cutting measures to be made for the North American models, which included a lower quality trim material for the interior. Leatherette replaced leather as the optional seating upholstery, and leather was still available on Canadian-spec models. Lower end North American models lost the multi-link rear suspension of the previous generation until the 2015 model year. Engines from the A5 Jetta carried over included the 170 hp (127 kW; 172 PS) 2.5 L (five-cylinder) as well as the 140 hp (104 kW; 142 PS) 2.0 TDI (diesel) engine. The SEL Premium model retained the upscale soft-touch interior, as well as the multi-link independent rear suspension found on the GLI. North American models featured red turn signals instead of amber.

In North America, the base model (S in the US, Trendline in Canada) received a 2.0-litre 8-valve four-cylinder engine with 86 kW (115 hp; 117 PS) and 169 N⋅m (125 lbf⋅ft) torque. From model year 2016 onward, American S and SE models, and Canadian models Trendline and Comfortline Jettas would receive a 1.4-litre turbocharged engine that produces 150 hp (150 PS; 110 kW) and 184 lb⋅ft (249 N⋅m) of torque. This engine replaced the 2.0-litre in those markets. The diesel and hybrid versions were both discontinued for 2017, the hybrid for slow sales and the diesel as a result of the Volkswagen emissions scandal related to their diesel engines.

New for 2014, the 2.5 L inline-5 was replaced with the new 1.8 L TSI turbocharged 4 cylinder. Based on the EA888 engine platform, the 1.8 TSI is listed as one of Ward's 10 Best Engines for 2014, producing 170 hp (127 kW; 172 PS) and 249 N⋅m (184 ft⋅lb) of torque, all while achieving an EPA rating of 25 MPG city / 36 MPG highway. Other updates for 2014 include an independent multilink rear suspension as found in European counterparts, and electronic power steering (1.8 TSI models only).

=== Other markets ===
In Europe, the engine range consists of the 1.2 TSI, 1.4 TSI (122 or 160 PS), 2.0 TSI, 1.6 TDI, and 2.0 TDI engines. The European version will differ in some respects, particularly in having multi-link suspension at the rear. The European version will also incorporate soft-touch plastics on most of the dashboard (not the doors for this generation), and the rear seat centre air vents have been restored. For the 2015 model year, Volkswagen made numerous improvements to the Jetta such as new front and rear fascias, headlights, reworked interior, fully independent suspension for all US models, a suite of driver-assistance systems such as blind-spot monitoring, cross-traffic alert, and standard rearview camera.

The sixth-generation Jetta went on sale on 22 July 2010 in Mexico, thus becoming one of the only countries in the world where both the fourth (sold as the Volkswagen Clásico), and sixth-generation Jetta were available simultaneously. (Both models are also both available in Colombia and Argentina). The sixth-generation Jetta replaced the fifth, known in Mexico as the Volkswagen Bora. A special edition called the "Volkswagen Jetta Edición Especial Bicentenario" and approved by the Mexican Federal Government commemorates that country's 200th anniversary of the beginning of the Mexican War of Independence, on 16 September 1810. It is also the first car in Mexico with granted permission to use an official government logo (a "2010" plaque).

It was launched in India on 17 August 2011. The Jetta was imported to India through the CKD route, and was locally assembled at Volkswagen's Chakan factory, near Pune. The 2015 Jetta facelift was released in the Indian car market on 17 February 2015.

It was launched in Australia and South Africa in September 2011 and although production ended at the end of 2017, Australia stockpiled units and the last ones were sold in mid-2019.

This was the last model produced for the UK as of November 2017, after 379 models were sold between 1 January and 1 October 2017. Orders closed in September 2017.

In January 2018, Volkswagen axed the Jetta in Europe as sales fell by a quarter in 2017 with just over 5,000 units being sold all year. Sales slipped in the US by 4.4%.

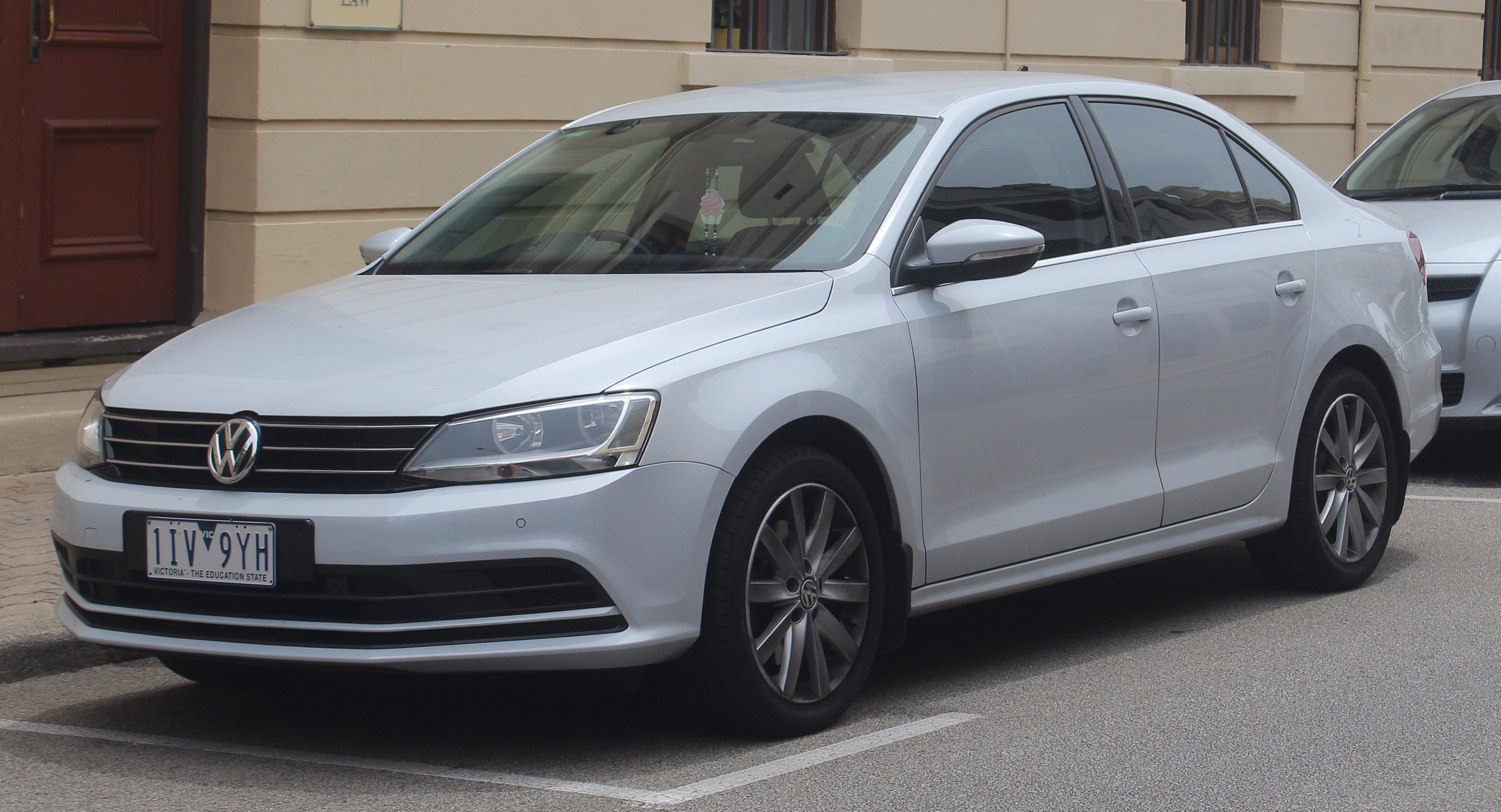
2016 Volkswagen Jetta (facelift)

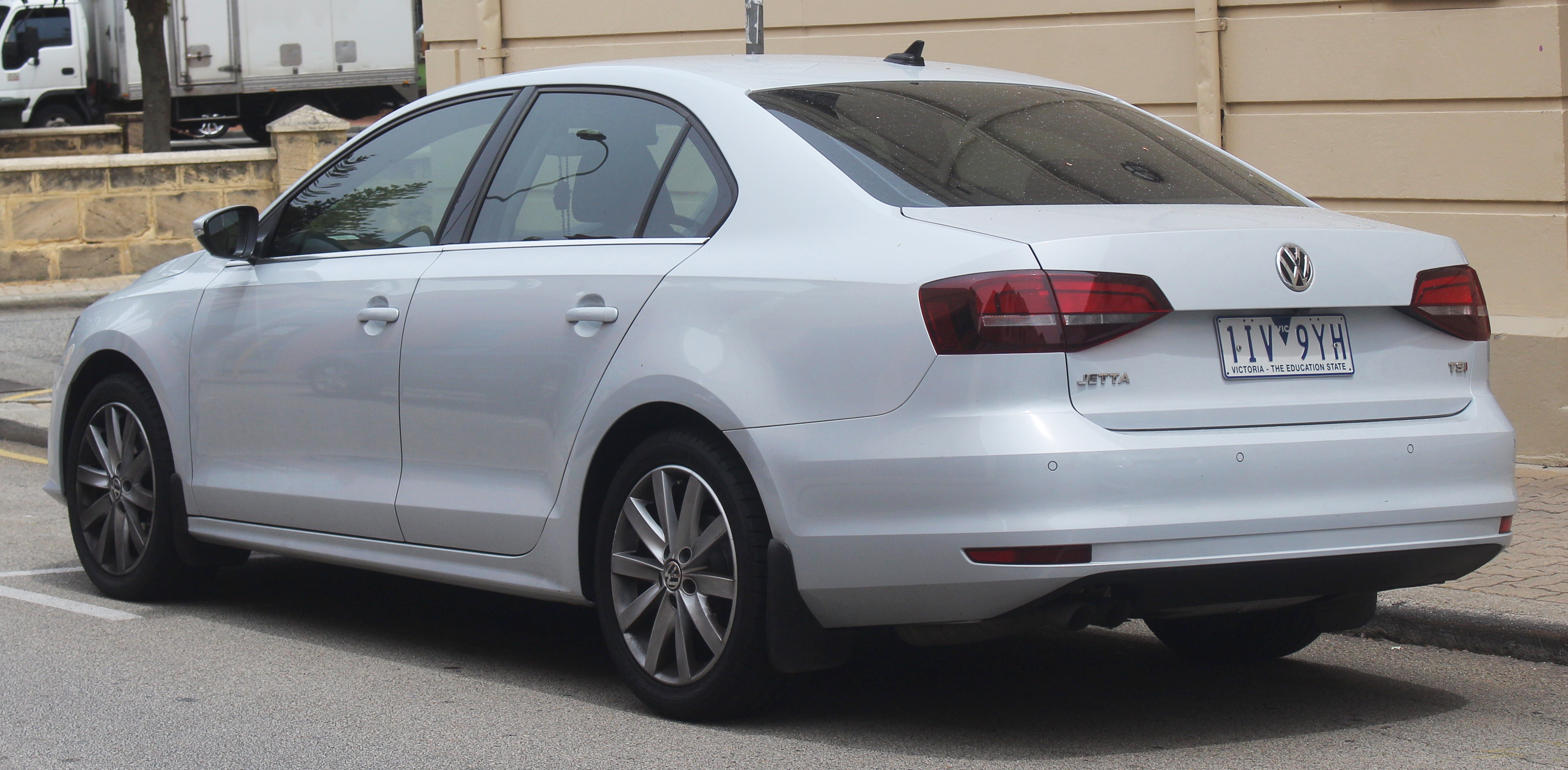
2016 Volkswagen Jetta (facelift)

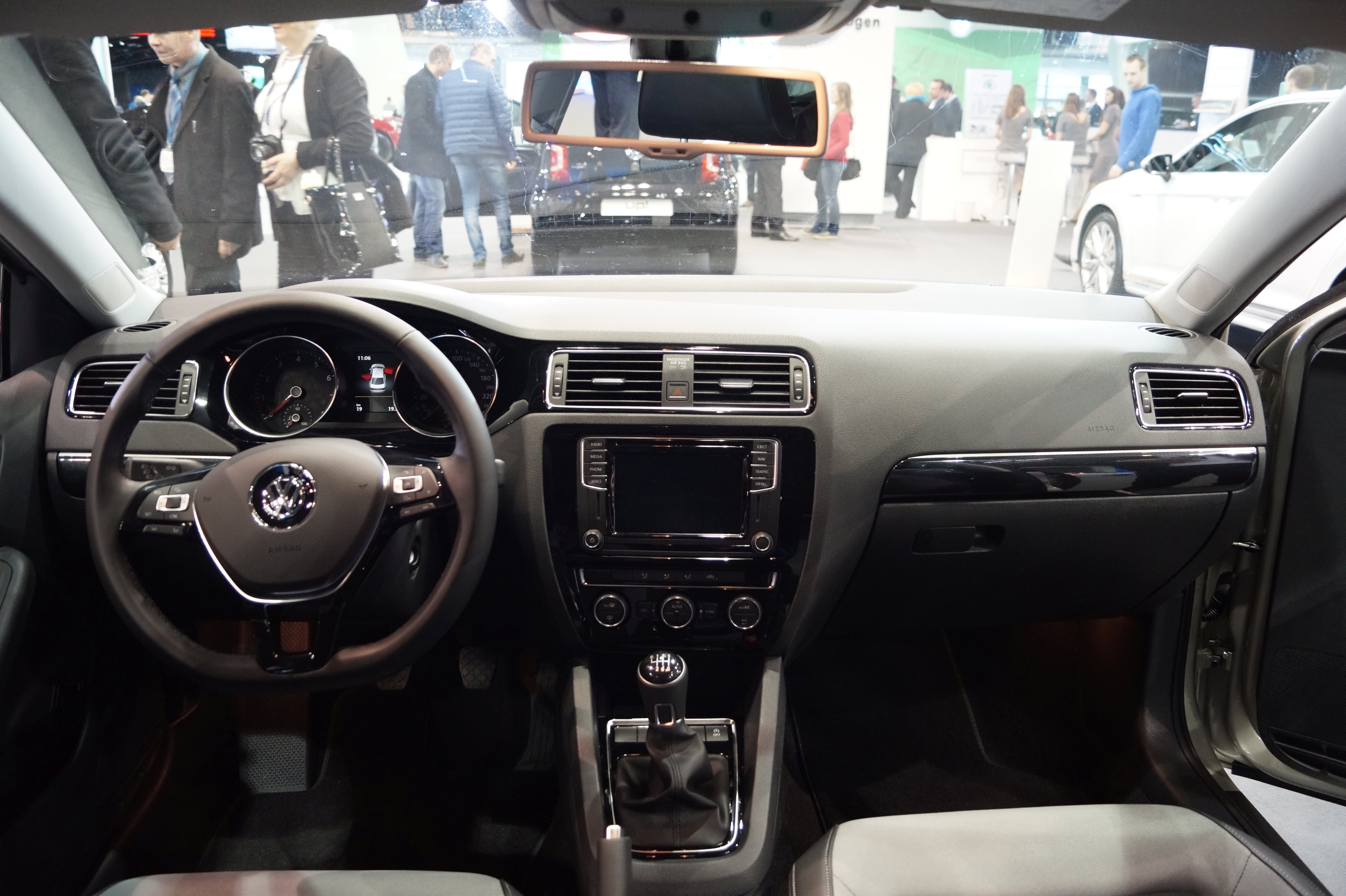
Interior (facelift)

=== Hybrid ===
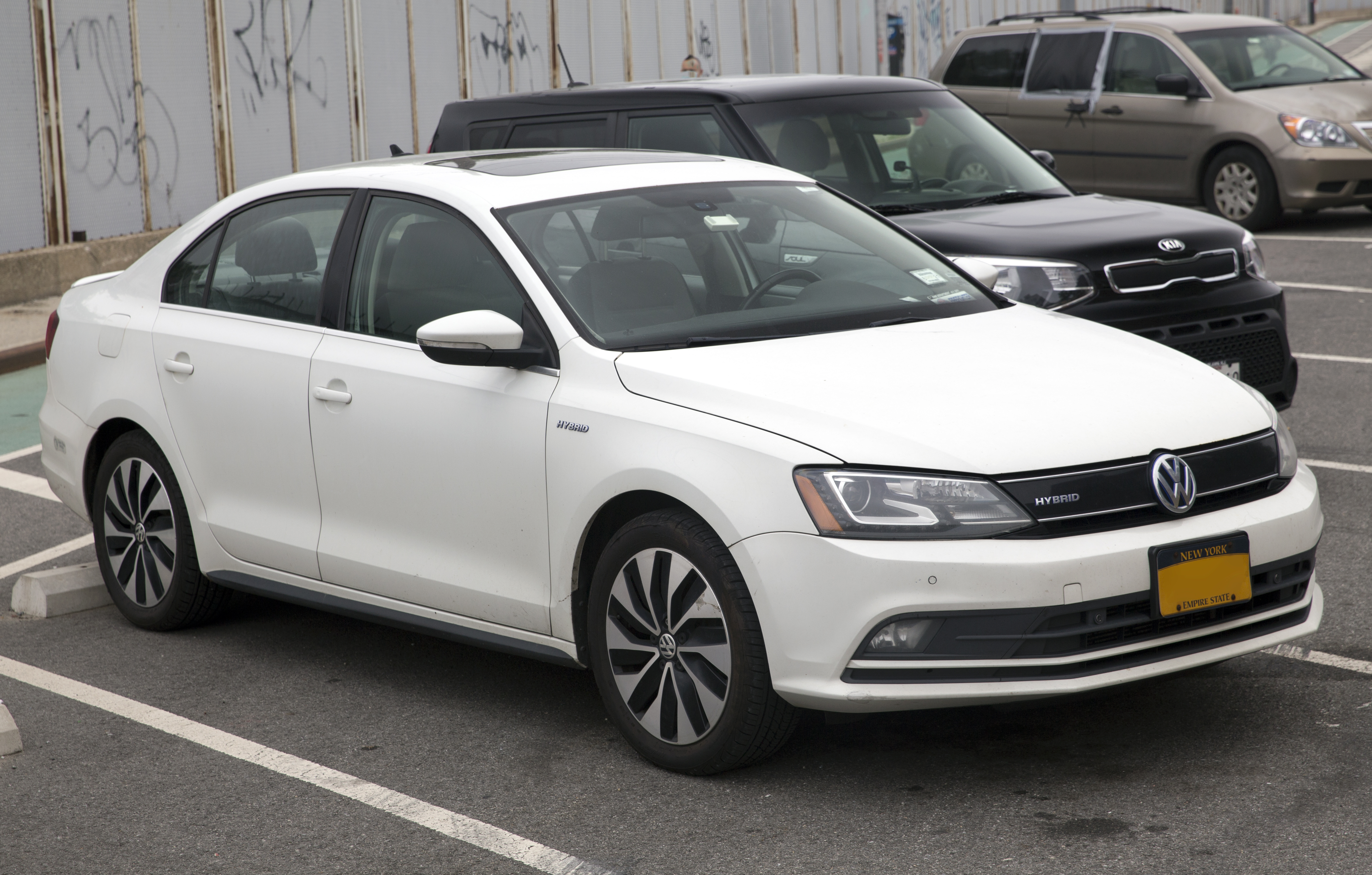
2015 Volkswagen Jetta Hybrid

Rear view

The Volkswagen Jetta Turbo Hybrid was unveiled in January 2012 at the North American International Auto Show for the 2013 model year. It was developed due to Hybrid popularity in North America. The variant is powered by a 1.4 L TSI intercooled turbocharged engine producing 111 kW (149 hp; 151 PS) mated with a 20 kW (27 hp; 27 PS) electric motor providing a combined 127 kW (170 hp; 173 PS) and 249 N⋅m (184 ft⋅lb). It also has as standard a 7-speed DSG DQ200 automatic transmission, with Sport and Tiptronic modes. The Jetta Turbo Hybrid has an estimated combined fuel economy of 5.2 L/100 km (54 mpg_{‑imp}; 45 mpg_{‑US}). Sales of the 2013 Jetta Turbo Hybrid began in the U.S. by late 2012. In mid-2016, the Hybrid model (as well as the diesel option) was discontinued from the U.S. market without replacement.

== Safety ==
=== ANCAP ===
ANCAP test results Volkswagen Jetta 1.2L and 1.4L petrol variants only (2011)
Test	Score
Overall	5 /5 stars
Frontal offset	15.20/16
Side impact	16/16
Pole	2/2
Seat belt reminders	2/3
Whiplash protection	Not Assessed
Pedestrian protection	Adequate
Electronic stability control	Standard

=== Euro NCAP ===
Euro NCAP test results Volkswagen Jetta 1.2 TSI 'Trendline' (LHD) (2011)
Test	Points	%
Overall:	5 /5 stars	
Adult occupant:	33.7	94%
Child occupant:	42	86%
Pedestrian:	20.2	56%
Safety assist:	5	71%

=== IIHS ===
The 2015 model year Jetta was awarded "Top Safety Pick" by IIHS.

IIHS scores (2015 model year)
Small overlap front (driver)	Good	
Small overlap front (passenger)	Acceptable	
Moderate overlap front (original test)	Good	
Side impact (original test)	Good	
Roof strength	Good	
Head restraints and seats	Good	
Front crash prevention: vehicle-to-vehicle	Basic	Optional
Child restraint LATCH ease of use	Poor	

=== Latin NCAP ===
The Jetta in its most basic Latin American market configuration with 2 airbags received 5 stars for adult occupants and 4 stars for toddlers from Latin NCAP 1.0 in 2013.

Latin NCAP 1.5 test results Volkswagen Jetta / Vento + 2 Airbags (2013, similar to Euro NCAP 2002)
Test	Points	Stars
Adult occupant:	15.34/17.0	5 /5 stars
Child occupant:	39.20/49.00	4 /5 stars

== Jetta GLI ==
The Jetta GLI, a sedan equivalent of the Golf GTI based on the new Jetta, was revealed at the 2011 Chicago Auto Show with the 2.0 TSI 200 hp engine and a fully independent suspension, as well as the European Jetta's soft-touch materials. A black honeycomb grille, aggressive lower intakes, side adorning foglights, smoked taillights, dual tailpipes, red-painted calipers, and red stitching are all elements to separate it from its run-of-the-mill counterpart. The GLI, as well as the Jetta TDI, are the only two trims to receive Volkswagen's 6-speed manual transmission as well as the optional 6-speed DSG automatic gearbox. GLI models feature a sport suspension that rides 0.6 inches lower than other Jetta models and the XDS® Cross Differential System.

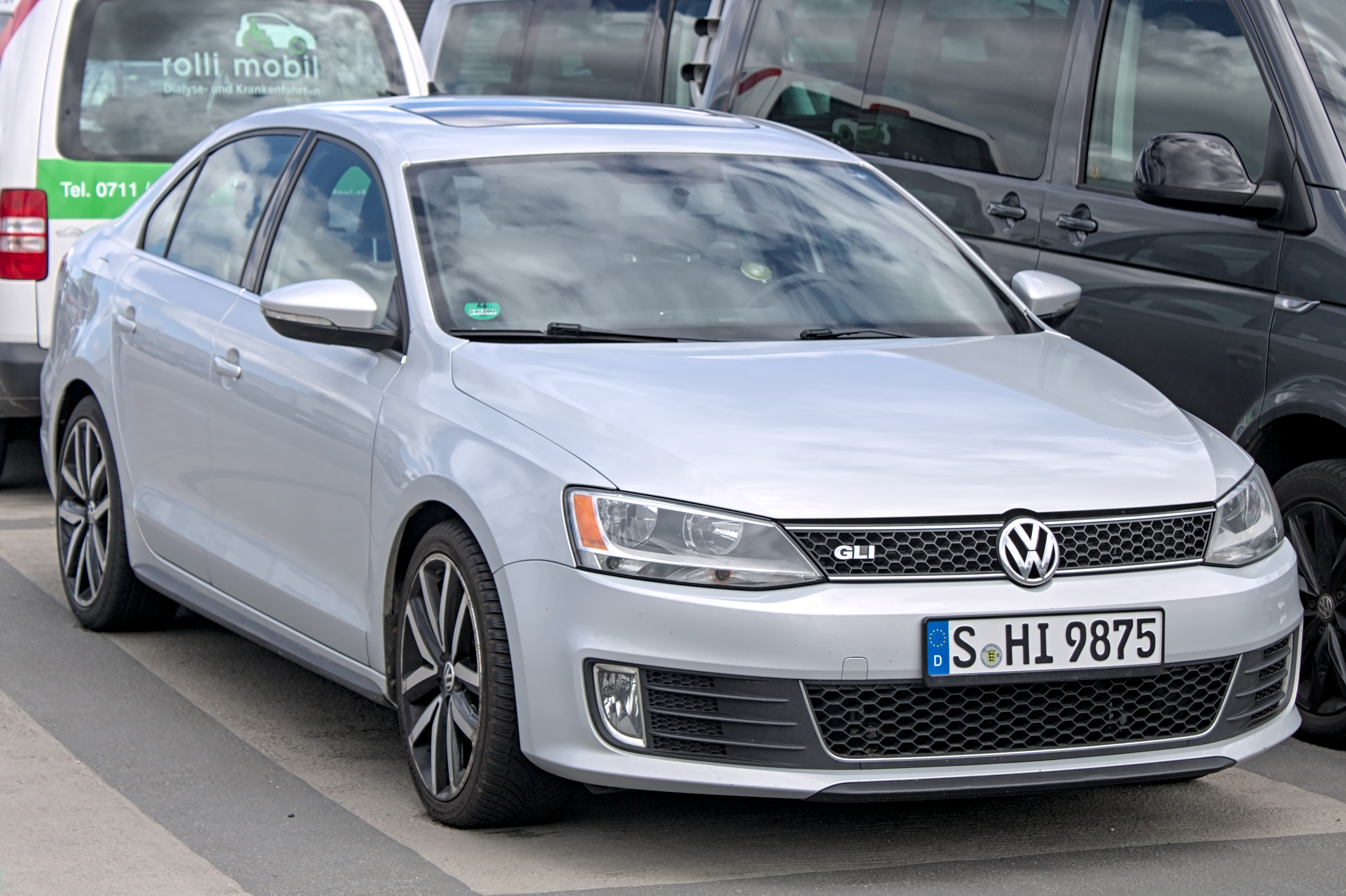
2012 Volkswagen Jetta GLI (pre-facelift)

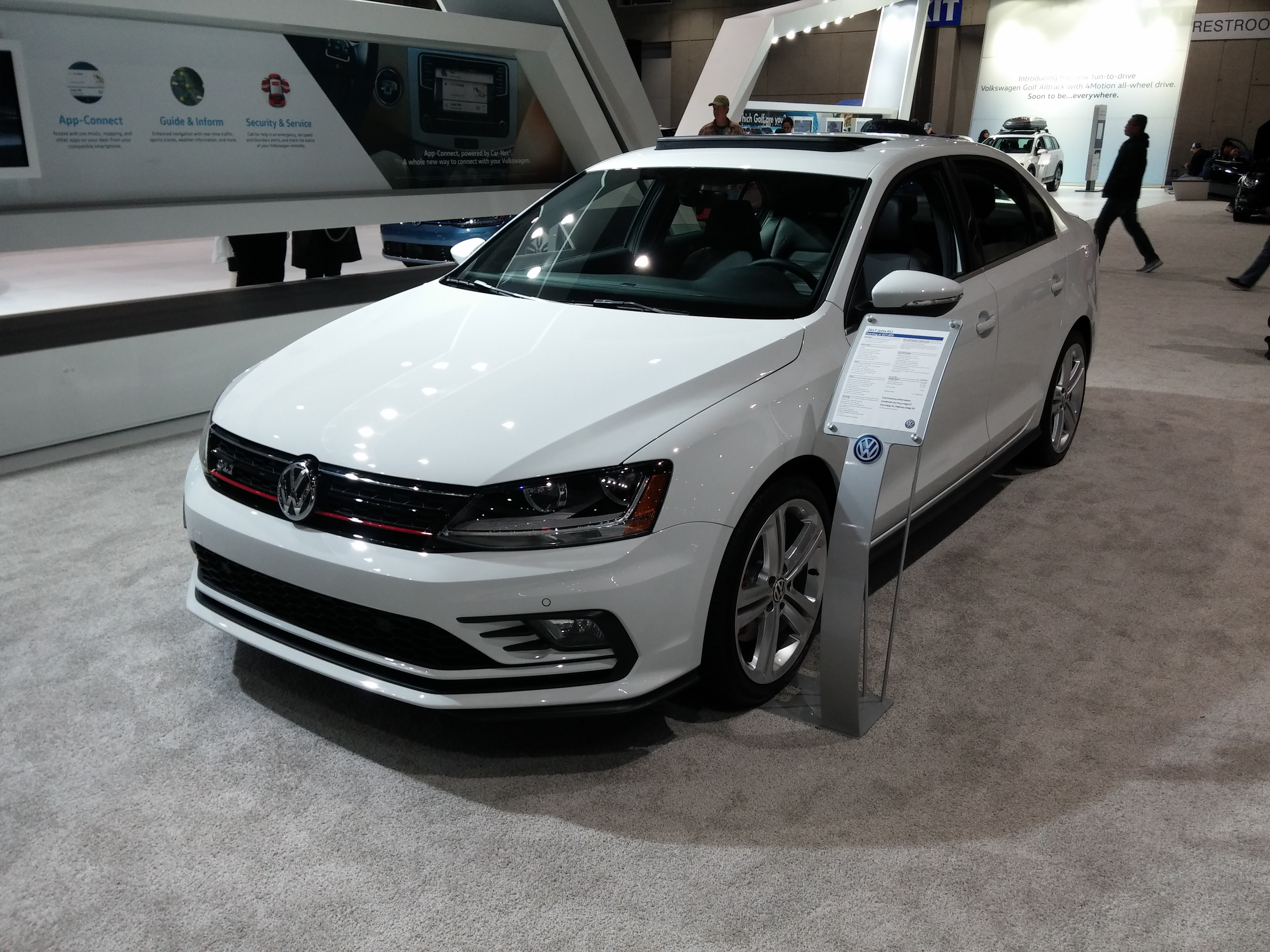
2017 Volkswagen Jetta GLI (facelift)

=== Jetta GLI Edition 30 (2014) ===
Including Edition 30 and the Edition 30 with Navigation, they are versions of 2014 Jetta GLI commemorating the 30th anniversary of Jetta GLI in the US market. Changes include 18-inch "Laguna" aluminum-alloy wheels, red trim on the front grille, a boot lid-mounted spoiler, Edition 30 badging, Bi-Xenon headlights (Edition 30 with Navigation), contrasting colour V-Tex leatherette seats with red accents; red contrast stitching on the steering wheel, shifter, brake lever, and armrests; carbon-look trim inlays; Edition 30 kickplates; floormats with red stitching, Choice of four body colours (Deep Black Metallic, Pure White, Tornado Red, and Reflex Silver Metallic).

The vehicle was set to go on sale in 2014.

== Jetta 1.8T Sport ==
Between 2015 and 2017, Volkswagen offered a limited-edition Jetta Sport in the US market. Based on the 1.8T SE with Connectivity (minus the sunroof), this trim adds a sport suspension, RNS 315 navigation with rearview camera, 17-inch "Joda Black" alloy wheels; two-tone heatable sport seats; foglights; black headliner; contrast stitching on leather-wrapped steering wheel, seats, handbrake and shift lever; rear spoiler. It is available in a five-speed manual and six-speed automatic transmission. Choice of four body colours (Black, Pure White, Tornado Red, and Platinum Grey Metallic) In 2016 the radio was upgraded to a 6.3" screen MIB-II unit with no other change to the car. A lighting package similar to the GLI is an available option which includes High-intensity Bi-Xenon headlights with LED Daytime Running Lights and an Adaptive Front-lighting System along with interior ambient lighting. The Sport and GLI models feature a sport suspension that rides 0.6 inches lower than other Jetta models. 2017 was the last year Volkswagen offered this trim with its sport-tuned suspension.

== China (Sagitar) ==
For China, the A6 Jetta entered the market in March 2012 as the second-generation Sagitar and became popular in sales, reaching 271,000 cars sold in 2013, followed by 300,000 in 2014, nearly 280,000 in 2015, 341,000 in 2016 and 327,000 in 2017. The Sagitar has also been spotted with "Pyeonghwa Zunma 1606" badging in North Korea; it is unknown whether it was assembled locally or if it was simply a rebadge.

The Sagitar was available with the 1.4-litre turbo and 1.6-litre engine paired with a 5-speed manual gearbox for both engines, a 6-speed automatic gearbox for 1.6 models, and a 7-speed dual-clutch automatic for 1.4 models. 1.8 TSI models were available for 2014 followed by the 2.0-litre TSI for 2016 and 1.2 TSI for 2017 and 2018. Models for sale until 2019 on the FAW-Volkswagen website consist of the 1.6 Comfort, 1.6 Fashion, 180TSI, 280TSI Comfort, 280TSI Luxury and 280TSI Flagship. Other trim levels consist of the Sagitar GLi and Sagitar R-Line which are available with the 2.0 litre TSI engine and 6 speed DSG and 1.4 litre turbo with 7 speed dual-clutch gearbox.

For horsepower ratings, the 1.2 litre engine produces 81 kW (110 PS) which is also shared with 1.6-litre engine, the 1.4-litre turbocharged engine produces 110 kW (150 PS), and the 2.0-litre TSI known as EA888 produces 147 kW (200 PS).

Chinese production for this generation Sagitar ended in September 2019.

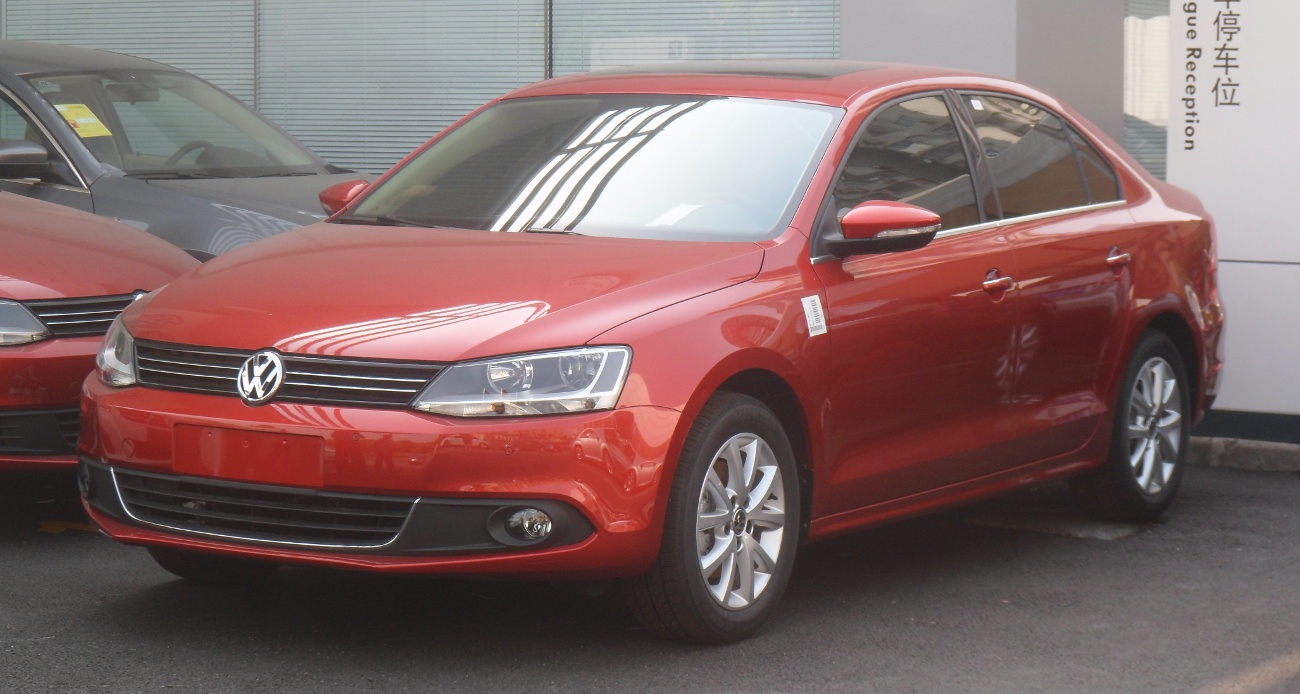
2012 Volkswagen Sagitar (pre-facelift)

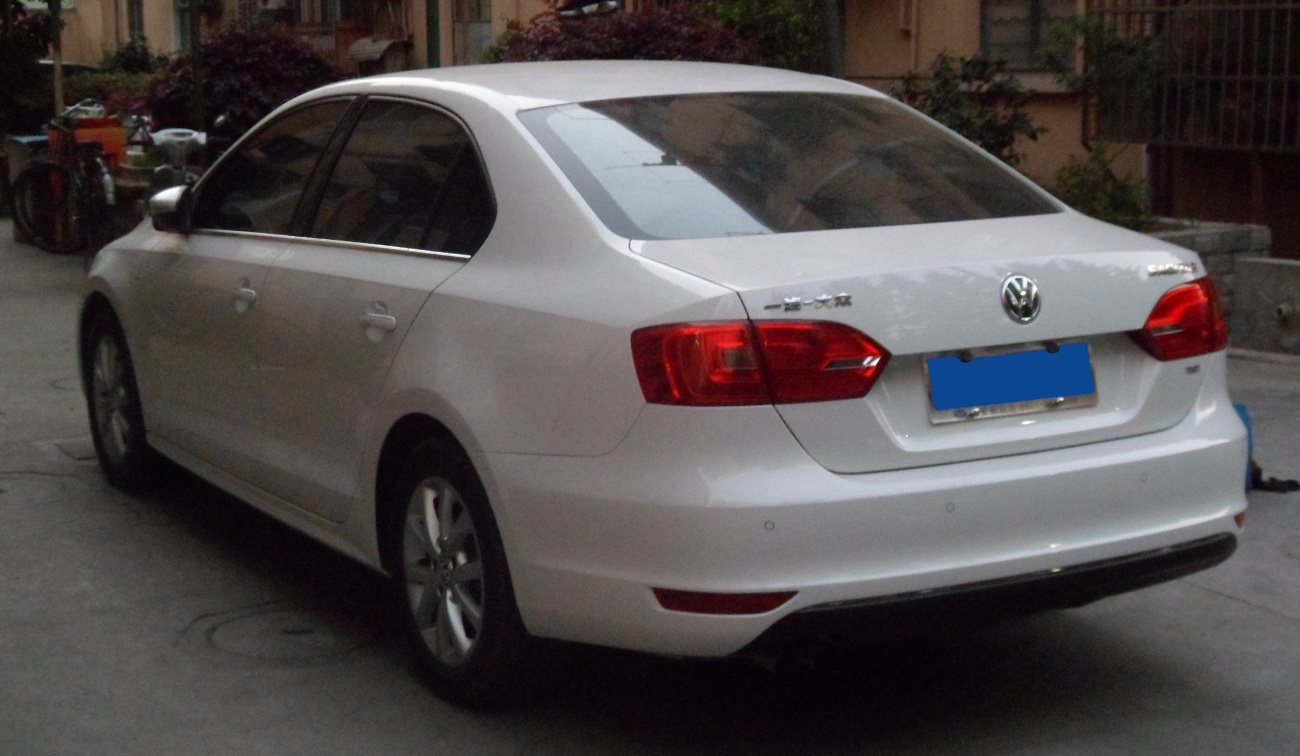
2012 Volkswagen Sagitar (pre-facelift)

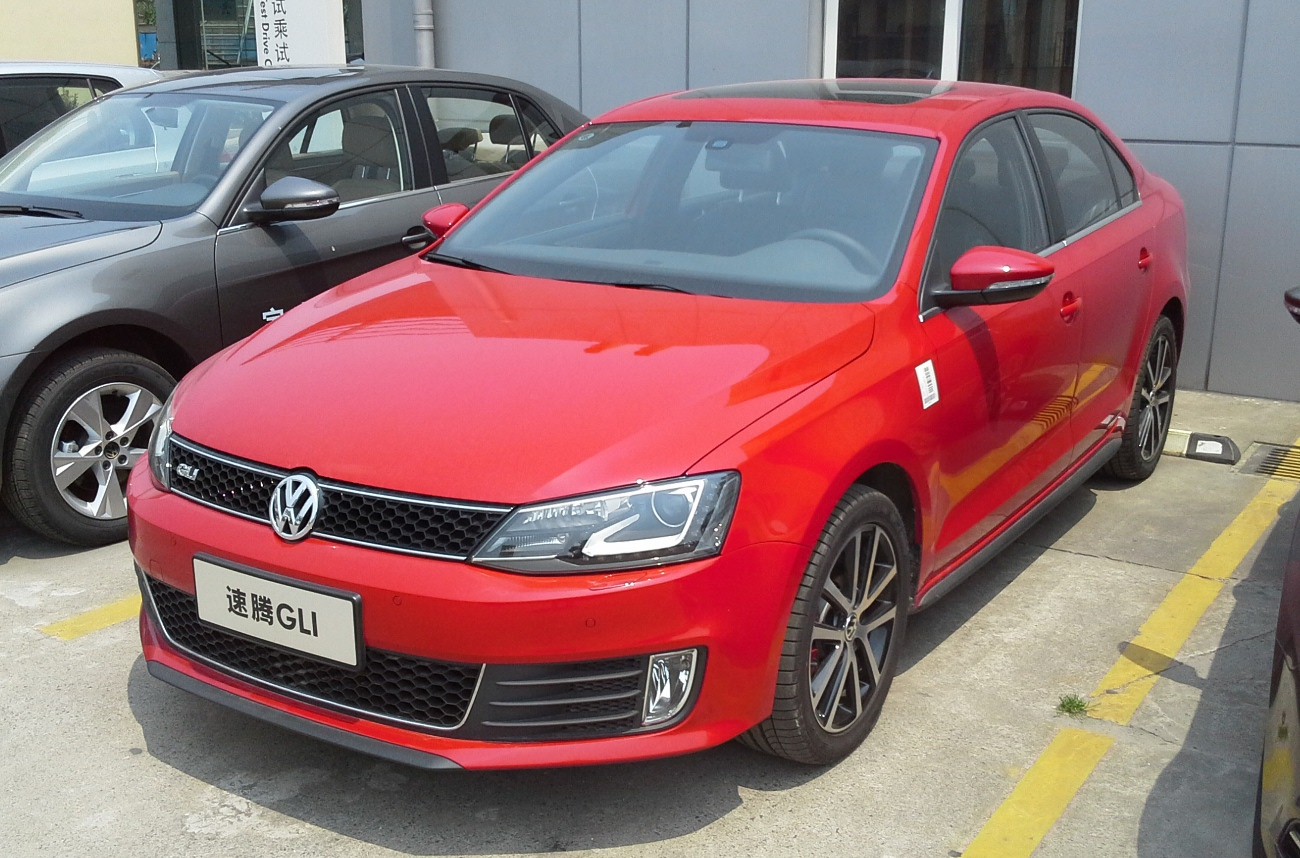
2014 Volkswagen Sagitar GLI (pre-facelift)

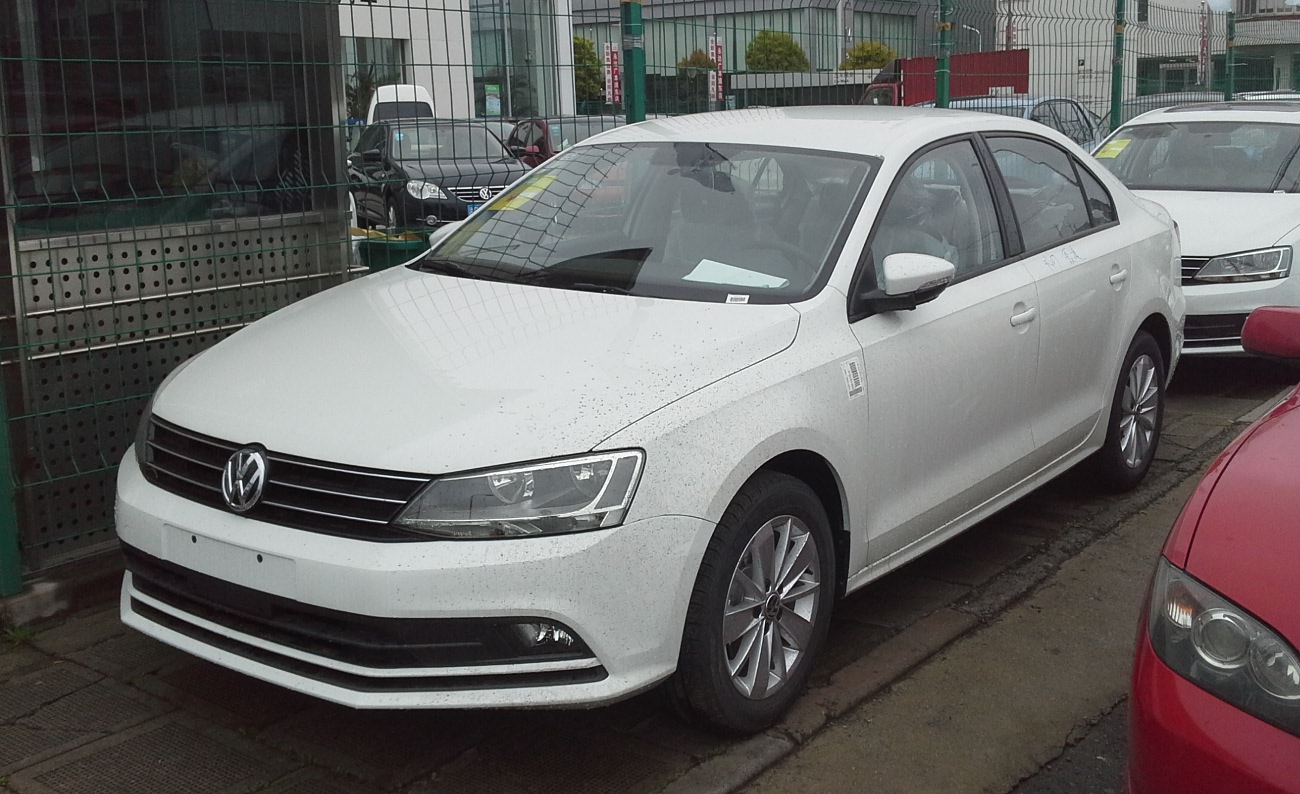
2015 Volkswagen Sagitar (facelift)

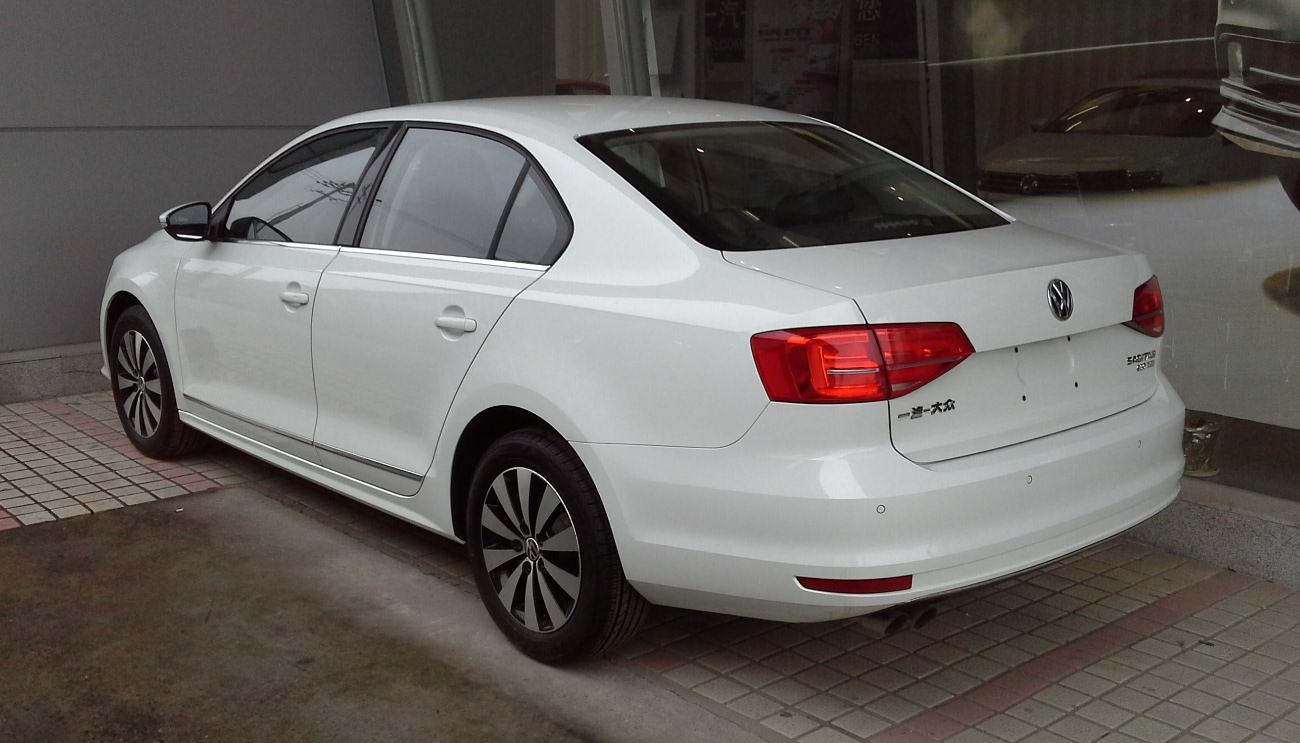
2015 Volkswagen Sagitar (facelift)

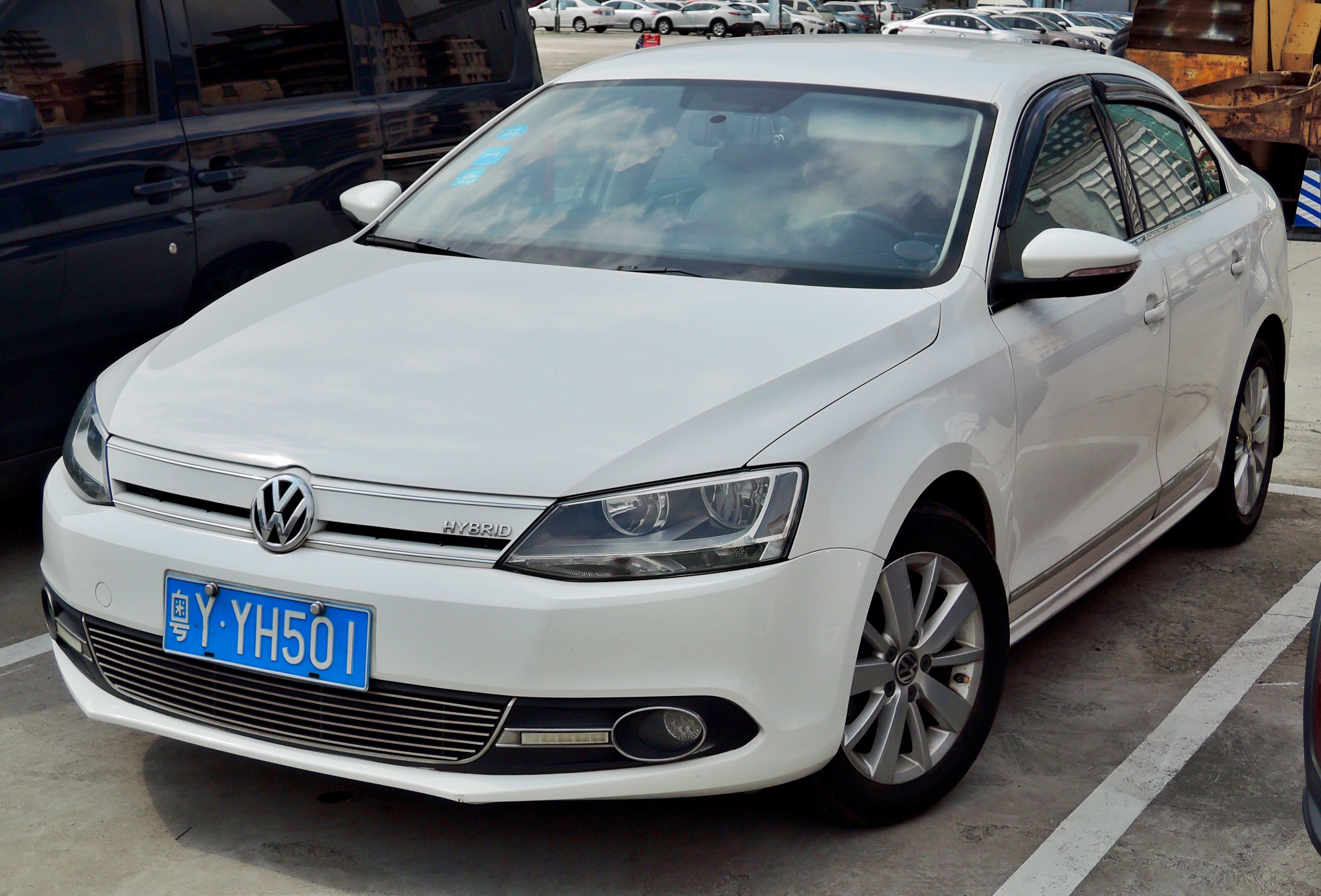
2017 Volkswagen Sagitar hybrid
