= VA3 =

VA3, VA-3, or VA 3 may refer to:

- Jetta VA3, a German-Chinese compact sedan
- NEC PC-88 VA3, an 8-bit home computer
- Virginia State Route 3
- Virginia's 3rd congressional district
