= Volkswagen Jetta (China) =

The Chinese version of the Volkswagen Jetta is manufactured by the joint venture FAW-Volkswagen since 1991. In 2019, the name was split out from Volkswagen to become its own marque and the model became known as the Jetta VA3.

== First generation (Jetta Mk2/A2/King/Pioneer; 1991) ==
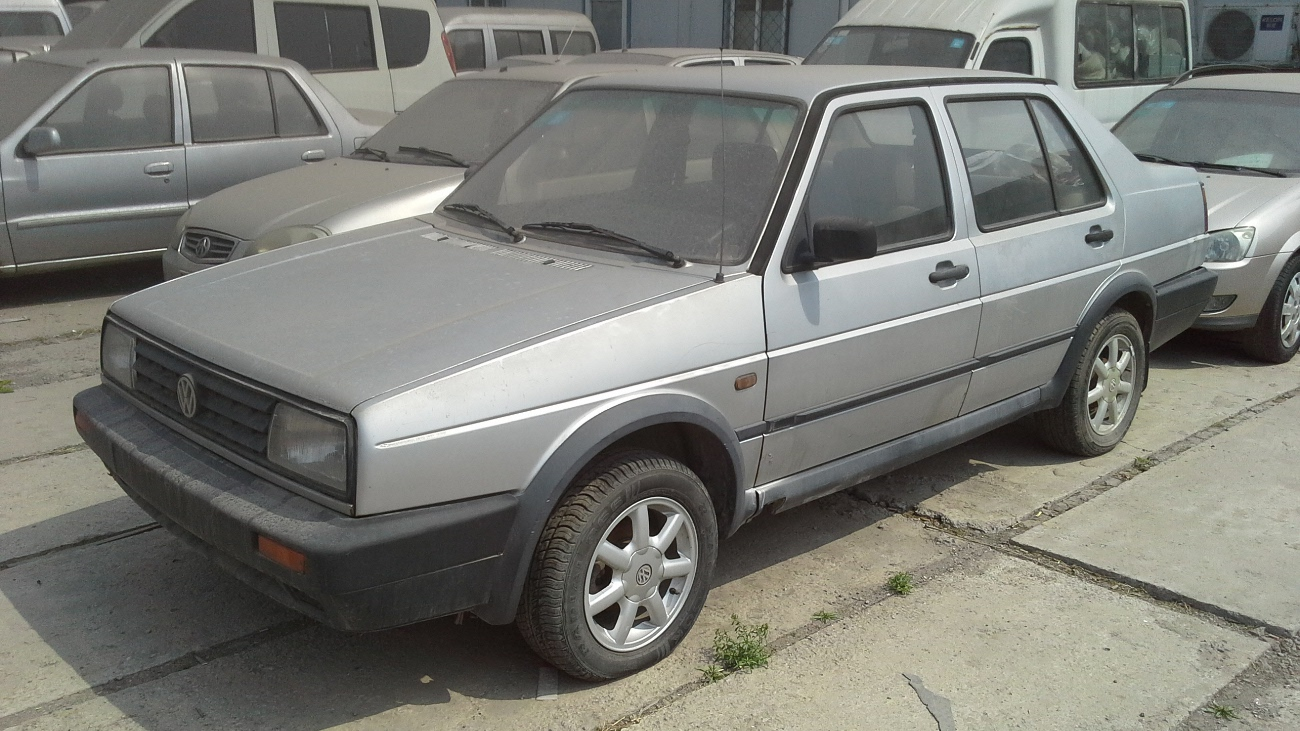
Volkswagen Jetta (China)

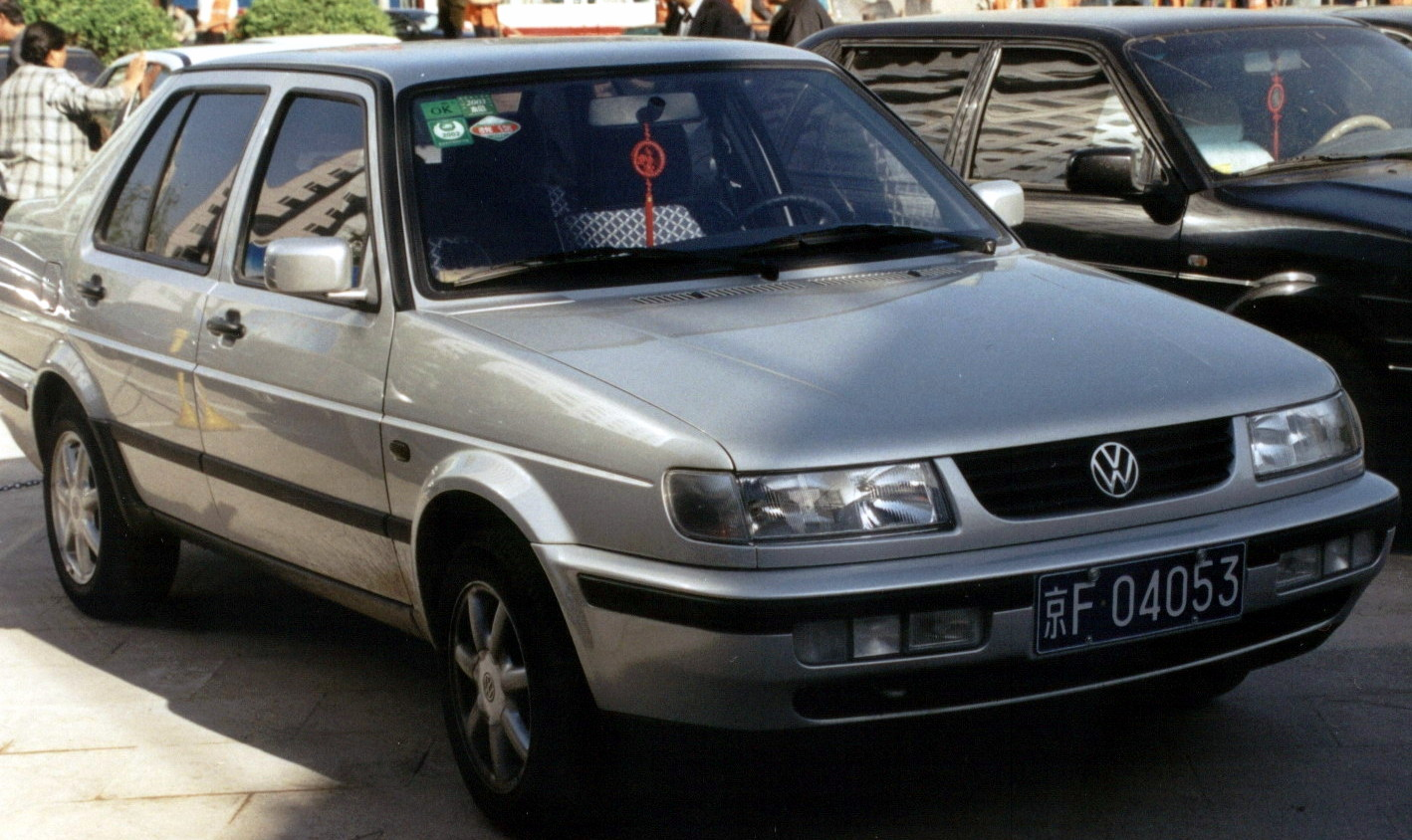
Volkswagen Jetta King (China)

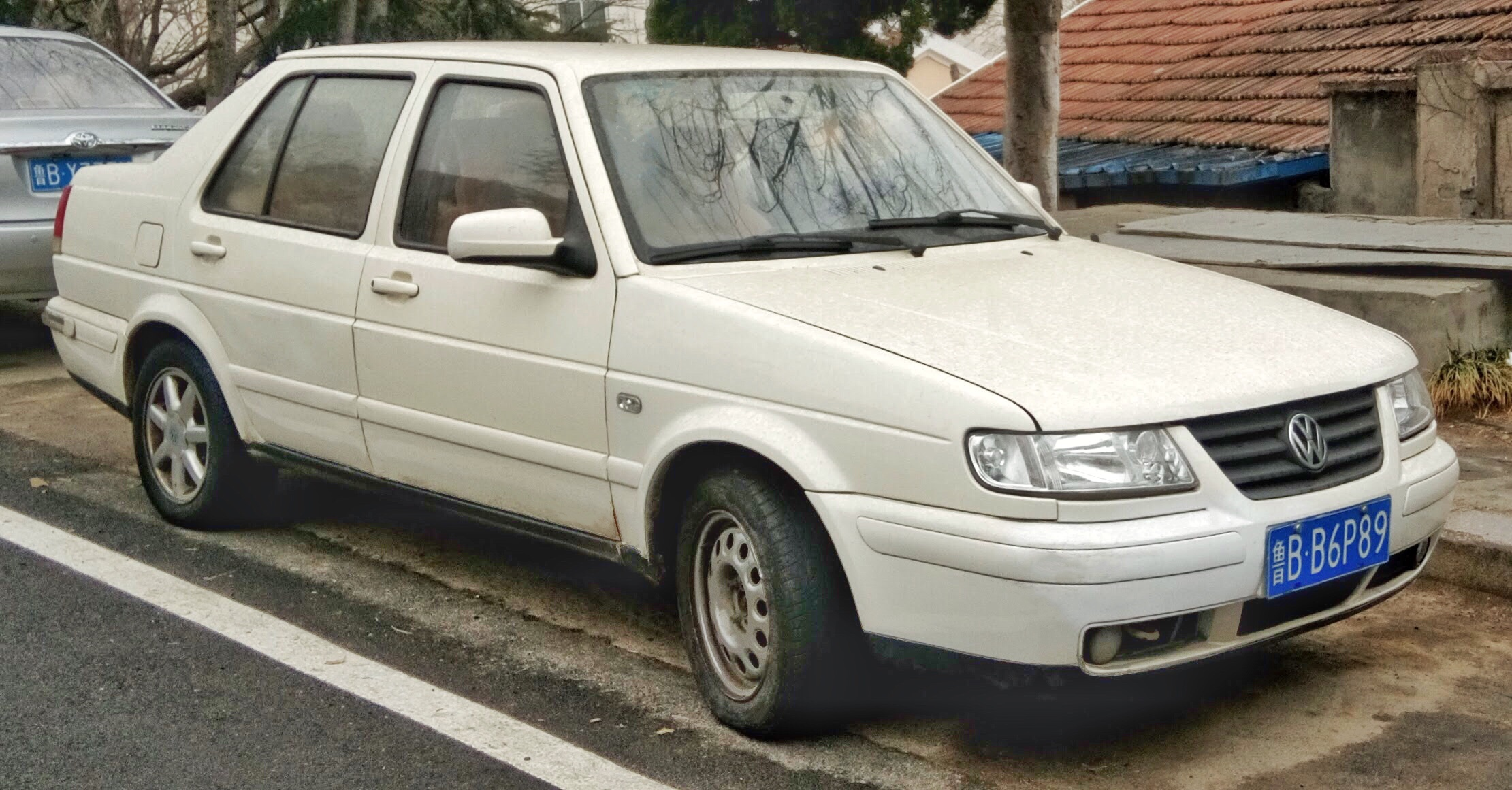
Volkswagen Jetta King minor facelift (China)

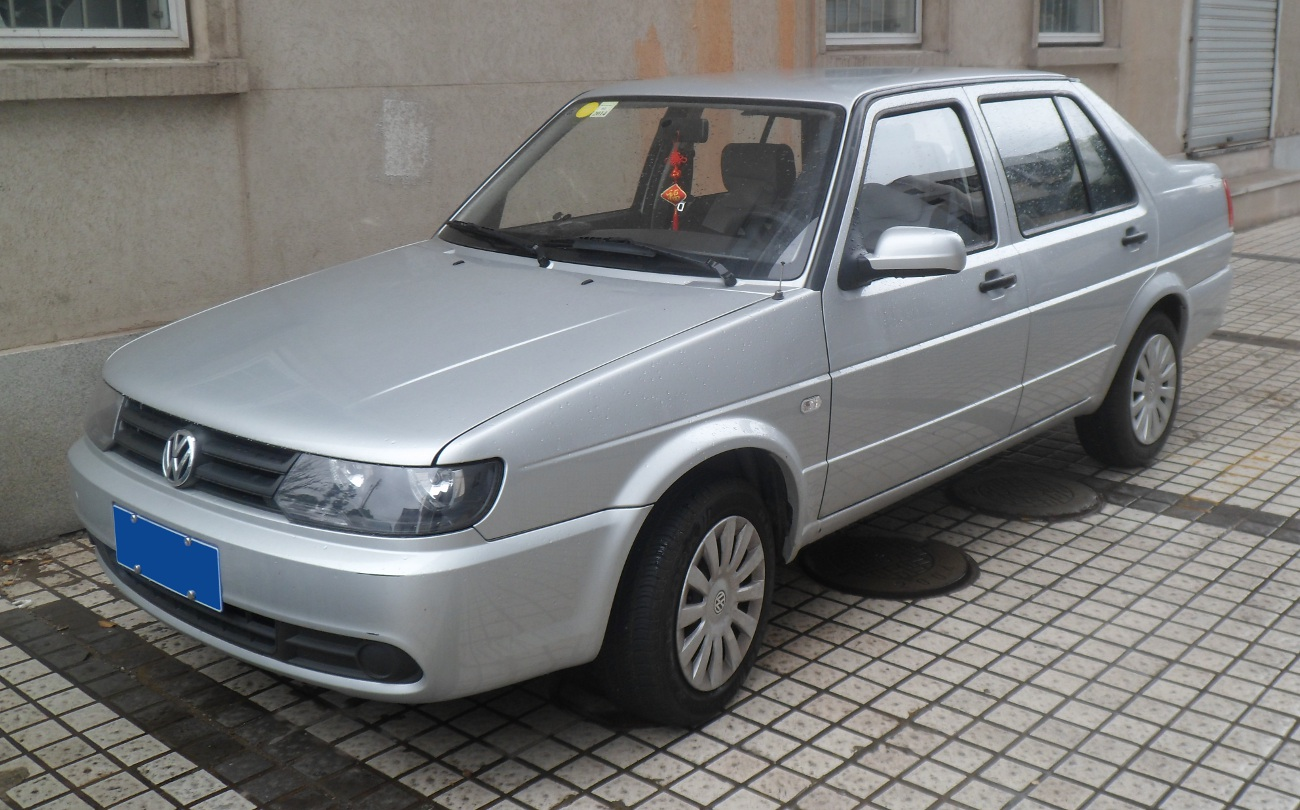
Volkswagen Jetta Pioneer (China)

The Mark 2 Jetta went on to become the first Volkswagen model produced in China by Volkswagen Group China's second joint venture partner FAW-Volkswagen. Production began on 5 December 1991. Initially sold as complete knock down (CKD) kits, local manufacturing has gradually taken over in the form of Semi-Knocked Down kits in 1992, and full local production in 1995.: In 1996 a 5-speed manual gearbox replaced the 4-speed one. The car has had three revisions since its inception in China.

=== Jetta King ===
Volkswagen Jetta King 大众捷达王
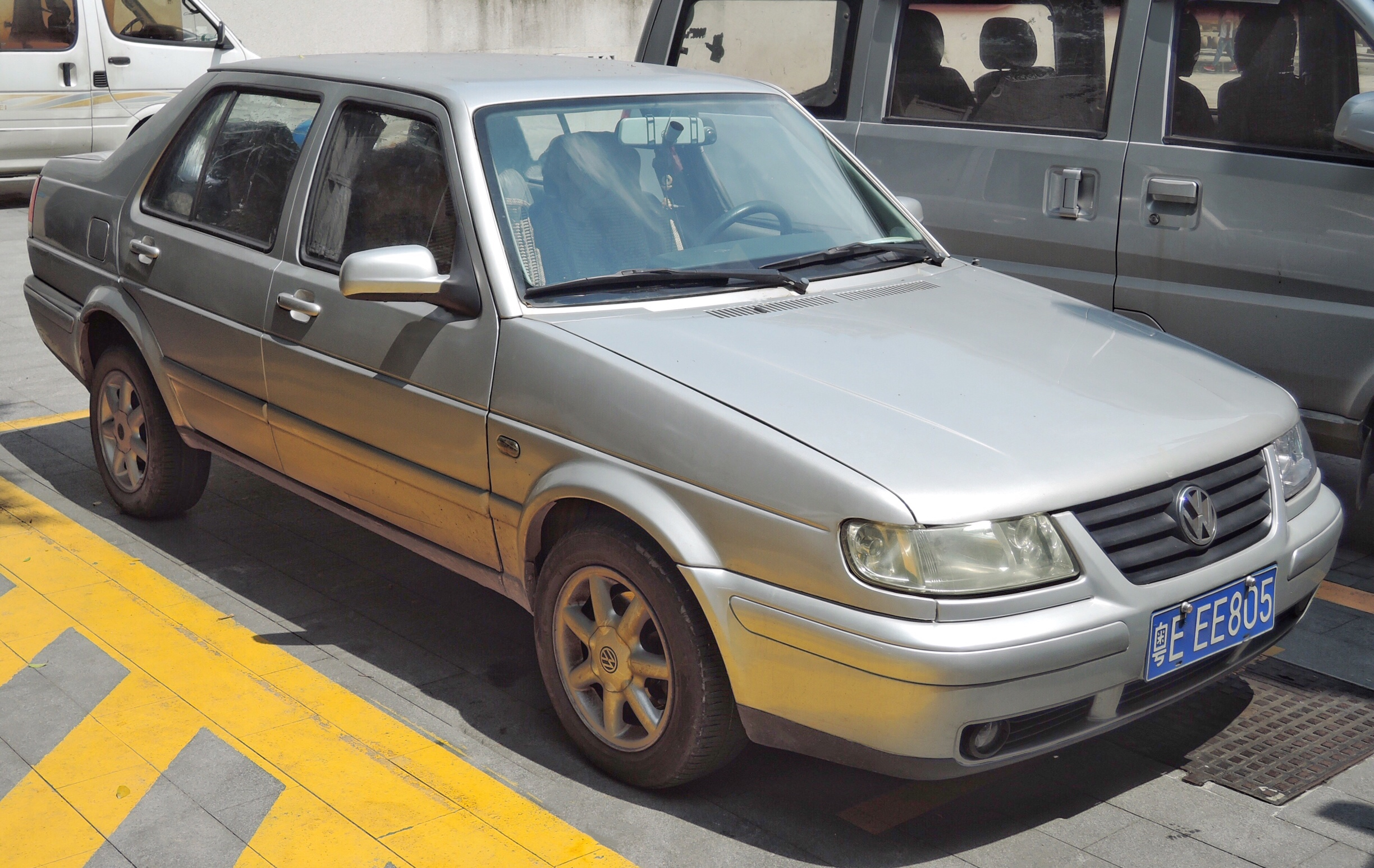
- A Jetta in Foshan, Guangdong, China.

Overview
- Manufacturer: FAW-Volkswagen
- Production: 1997–2010
- Assembly: China: Changchun (1997–2010); China: Chengdu (2008–2010)

Body and chassis
- Class: Compact
- Body style: 4-door sedan
- Layout: Front engine, front-wheel drive
- Platform: Volkswagen Group A2 platform
- Related: Volkswagen Jetta (A2); Volkswagen Passat

Powertrain
- Engine: 1.6 L EA113 I4; 1.9 L ASY SDI I4
- Transmission: 4/5-speed manual 4-speed automatic

Dimensions
- Wheelbase: 2,471 mm (97.3 in)
- Length: 4,071 mm (160.3 in) to 4,428 mm (174.3 in)
- Width: 1,660 mm (65.4 in) to 1,702 mm (67.0 in)
- Height: 1,415 mm (55.7 in) to 1,438 mm (56.6 in)
- Curb weight: 910 kg (2,006 lb) to 1,140 kg (2,513 lb)

Chronology
- Predecessor: Volkswagen Jetta (A2)
- Successor: Volkswagen Jetta Pioneer

The Volkswagen Jetta King, is a Chinese Volkswagen model produced by FAW-Volkswagen at its plants in Changchun and Chengdu. It was launched in April 1997 and replaced the Volkswagen Jetta. The Jetta King was the result of the technical combination between the Volkswagen Jetta and design scheme from the fourth generation Volkswagen Passat in 1997. Production started in August 1998, and its name was changed to "Jetta King" (or 大众捷达王 in Mandarin). The second facelift was revealed in March 2004 (taking influences from Volkswagen's most expensive model, the Phaeton). On 29 July 2007, it was announced that First Automotive Works expanded its production of the Mark 2 Jetta by building a new assembly plant in Chengdu, Sichuan Province in Southwest China. The expansion was driven by the high demand for the car, a desire to expand in the western part of the country, as well as the long-term goal of FAW to develop new derivatives from the car's platform independently of Volkswagen. The most striking feature of the Jetta King was the new front end. The interior of the different equipment lines came from the Corrado and Passat B5. The dimensions of the vehicles are different depending on the chosen equipment line. Only the trunk volume of 660 liters is the same for all units.

Initially it was only the 1.6-liter four-cylinder engine with 5 valves per cylinder and a displacement of 1595 cc available. The power of it was 74 kW. It had a manual four-speed gearbox, which later was replaced by a five speed gearbox. From November 1998 onward, there was an option for a 4-speed automatic. A month earlier, the first units were made with ABS (option).

In April 2001, the equipment line Meeresbrise was launched with an EFI engine and a power of 64 kW. A 1.9-liter diesel engine with a displacement of 1896 cc and a power output of 47 kW was added to the lineup in April 2002. The 1.6-liter engine was removed from the engine range. At the same time, the Jetta König was facelifted in 2002 with new front and rear fascias. A 1.6-liter EFI engine producing 70 kW was included in the range. At the same time the prestige model Meeresbrise was replaced by the new Avantgarde. It had dual airbags and can be recognized on the green or black tinted windows. From June 2009 the 1.6-liter RSH engine (type EA111) engine with a power of 70 kW was available.

Following equipment lines of the Jetta King were offered: AT, ATF, Avantgarde, CDX, CiF, CiX, CT, GDF, GiF, GT, GTI, GTX and Meeresbrise.

The Volkswagen Jetta King was also available in the form of a 2-door pickup truck. Few of these were produced.

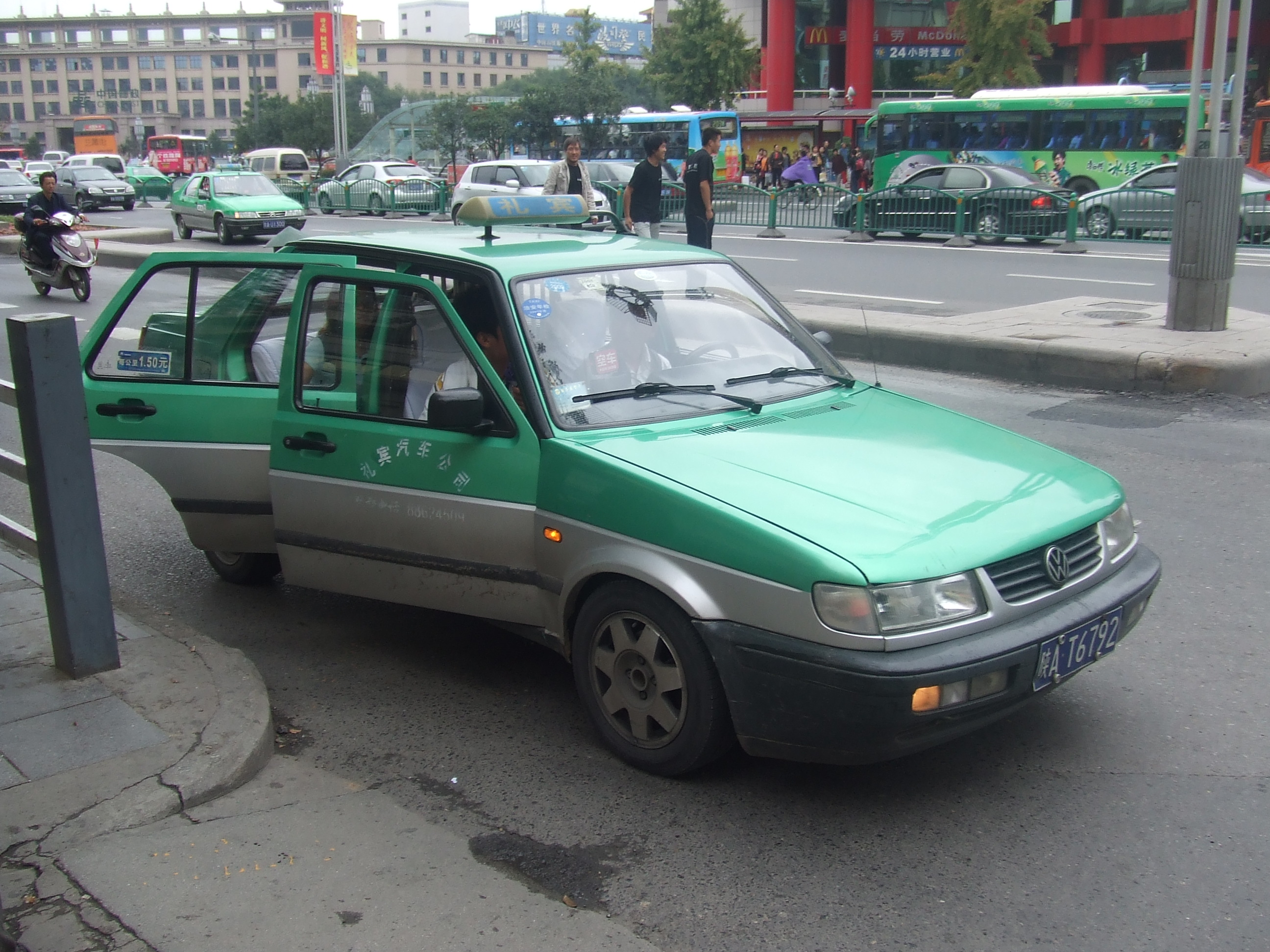
Pre facelift Jetta taxi in Xi'an

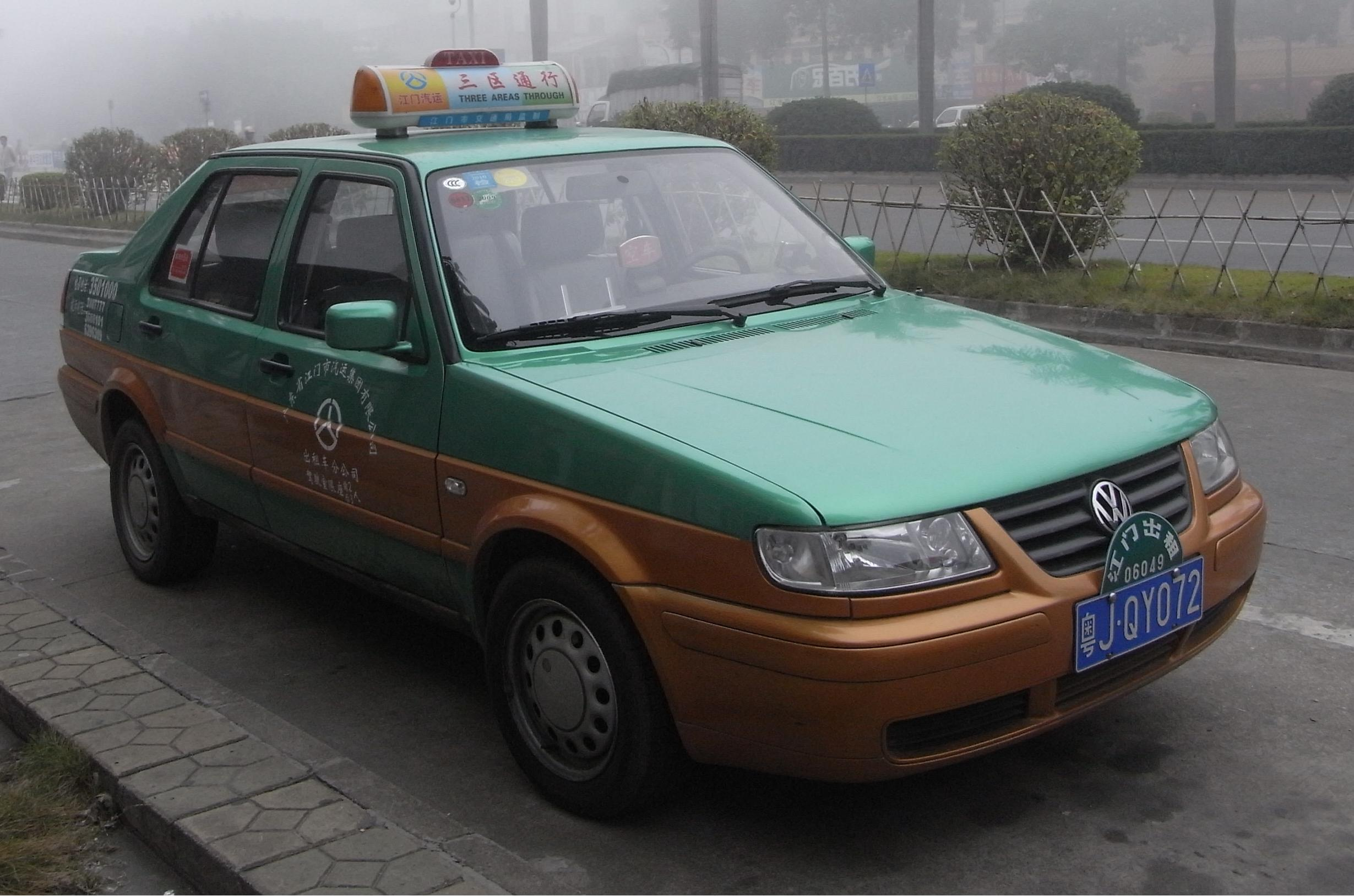
Facelift Jetta taxi in Jiangmen, Guangdong

=== Jetta Pioneer ===
Volkswagen Jetta Pioneer 大众捷达先锋
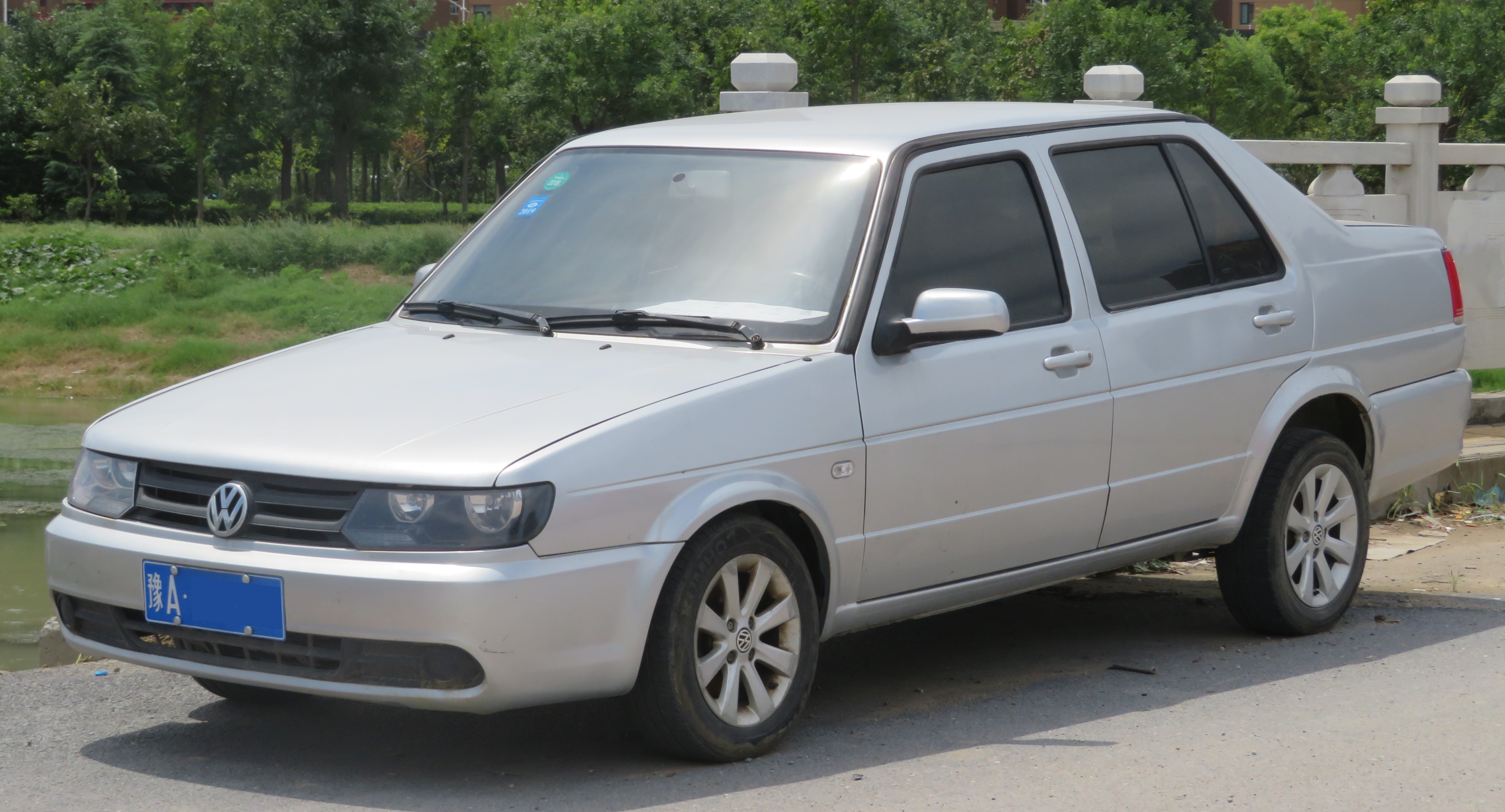
- A Jetta in Zhengzhou, Henan, China.

Overview
- Manufacturer: FAW-Volkswagen
- Also called: Pyeonghwa Hwiparam 1607 (North Korea)
- Production: 2010–2013
- Assembly: China: Changchun; China: Chengdu

Body and chassis
- Class: Compact
- Body style: 4-door sedan
- Layout: Front engine, front-wheel drive
- Platform: Volkswagen Group A2 platform
- Related: Volkswagen Jetta; Volkswagen Passat

Powertrain
- Engine: 1.6 L EA113 I4; 1.9 L ASY SDI I4
- Transmission: 5-speed manual

Dimensions
- Wheelbase: 2,471 mm (97.3 in)
- Length: 4,415 mm (173.8 in)
- Width: 1,674 mm (65.9 in)
- Height: 1,415 mm (55.7 in)
- Curb weight: 1,091 kg (2,405 lb)

Chronology
- Predecessor: Volkswagen Jetta King
- Successor: Volkswagen Jetta Night

The third facelift called the Volkswagen Jetta Pioneer, is a Chinese Volkswagen model produced by FAW-Volkswagen at its plants in Changchun and Chengdu. It was released in March 2010 replacing the Volkswagen Jetta King and taking some inspirations from stylings of Volkswagen models of the newest generation. A diesel version of the Jetta is also on sale, but a large proportion are in service as taxis in many cities in China, rather than as private cars.

The new exterior brought new production and sales records. It received new front and rear bumpers, along with new grille and lights. Furthermore, there was a new instrument panel with a three-spoke steering wheel to give the impression of a sporty car and driver's airbag as standard. Other standard features were a CD player that could read MP3 CDs, an ISOFIX system for child seats, the seat belt alarm for the driver and an antilock braking system and EBD for better distribution of the braking force. Only the taxi version had electrically adjustable rear view mirrors.

The 1.6-liter RSH with an output of 70 kW (94 HP) served as the standard engine. The consumption is indicated at 7.5 liters per 100 km (31 MPG US). However, the favorable fuel consumption was the optional 1.9L SDI engine with a power of 47 kW (63 HP). The consumption of this engine was indicated at 4.5 liters per 100 km (52 MPG US).

This version of the Jetta was not offered in different trim levels. It was a single model for the Chinese market. It varied in two forms only, one as a family car and the other as a taxi.

This was also the last Jetta in China to use the A2 platform after 20 years of production.

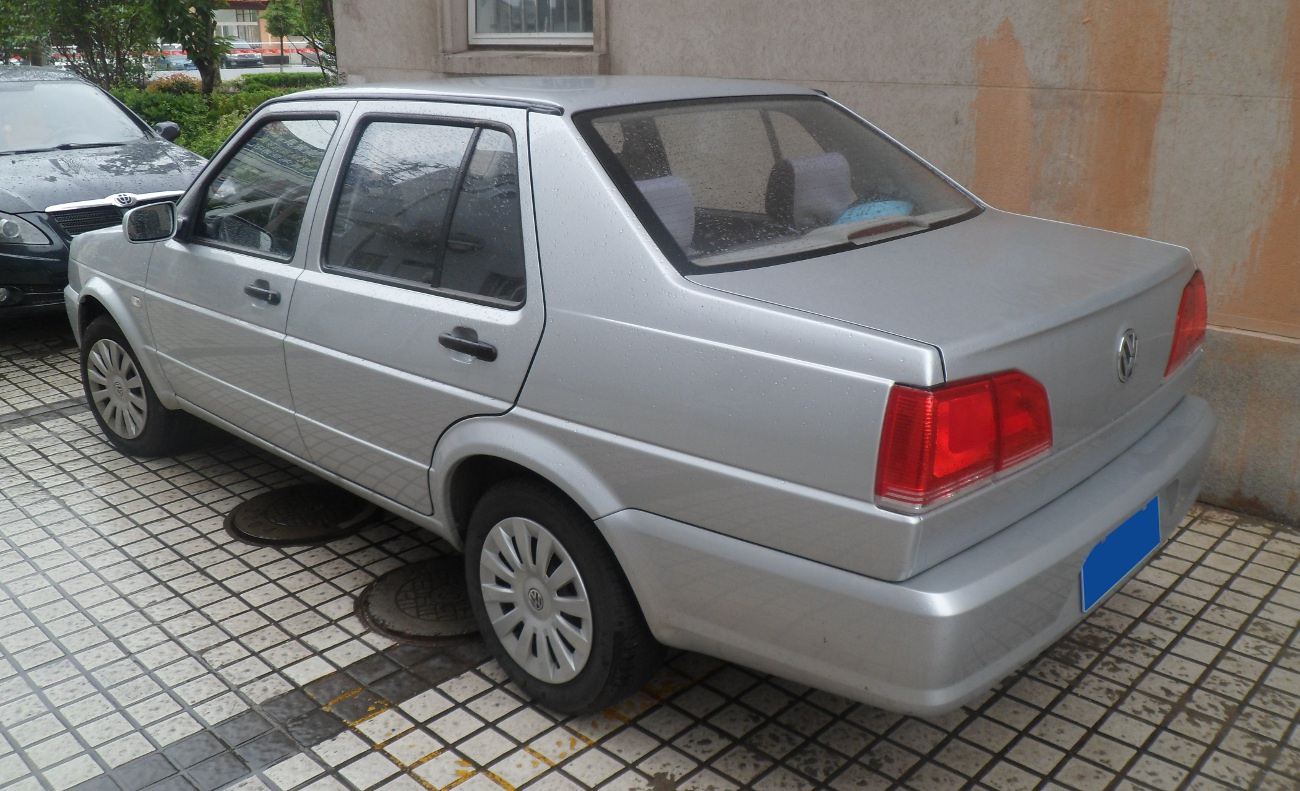
Rear side.

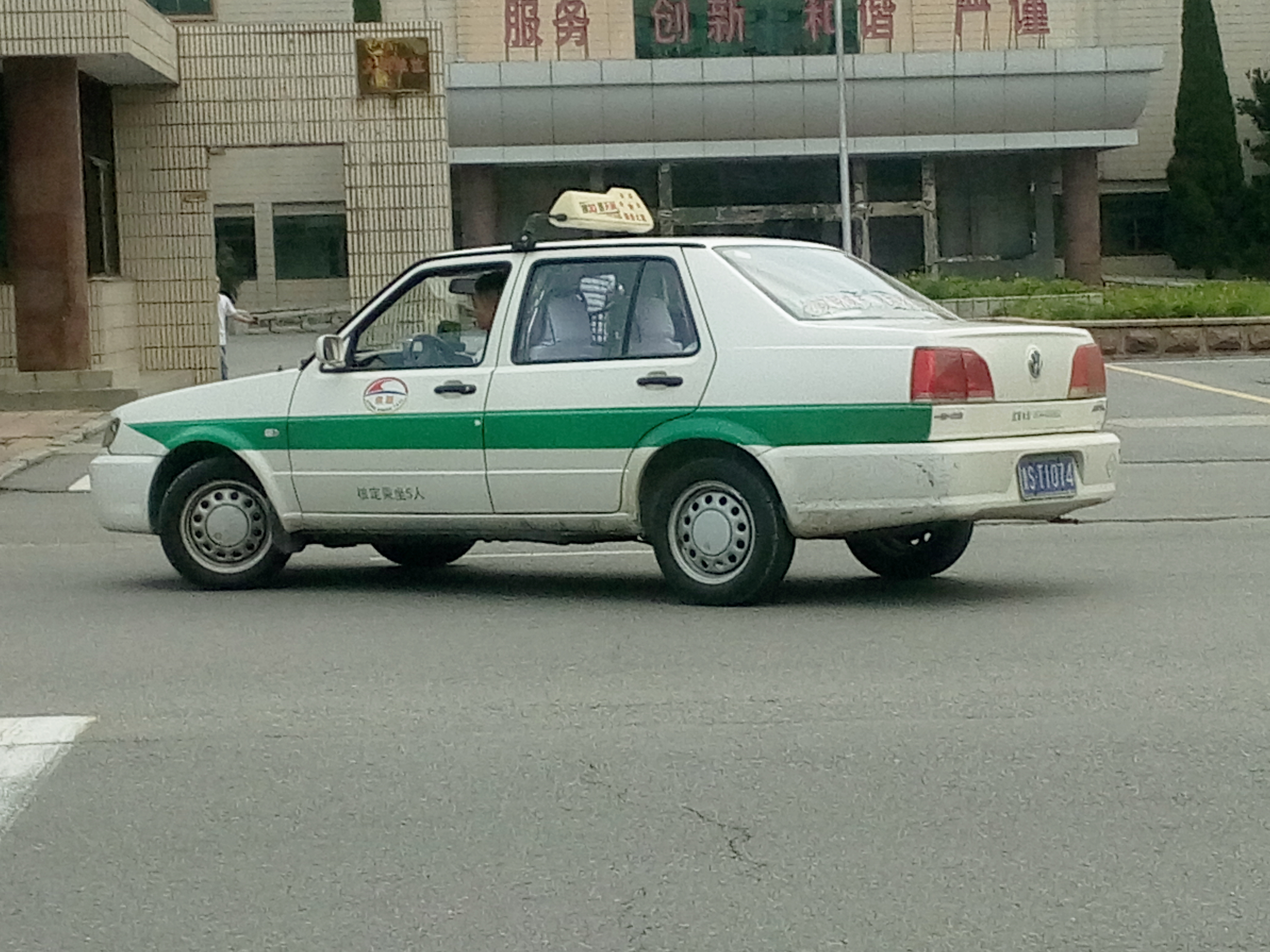
VW Jetta facelift taxi in Laiwu City, Shandong Province

== Second generation (New Jetta; 2013) ==
Volkswagen New Jetta
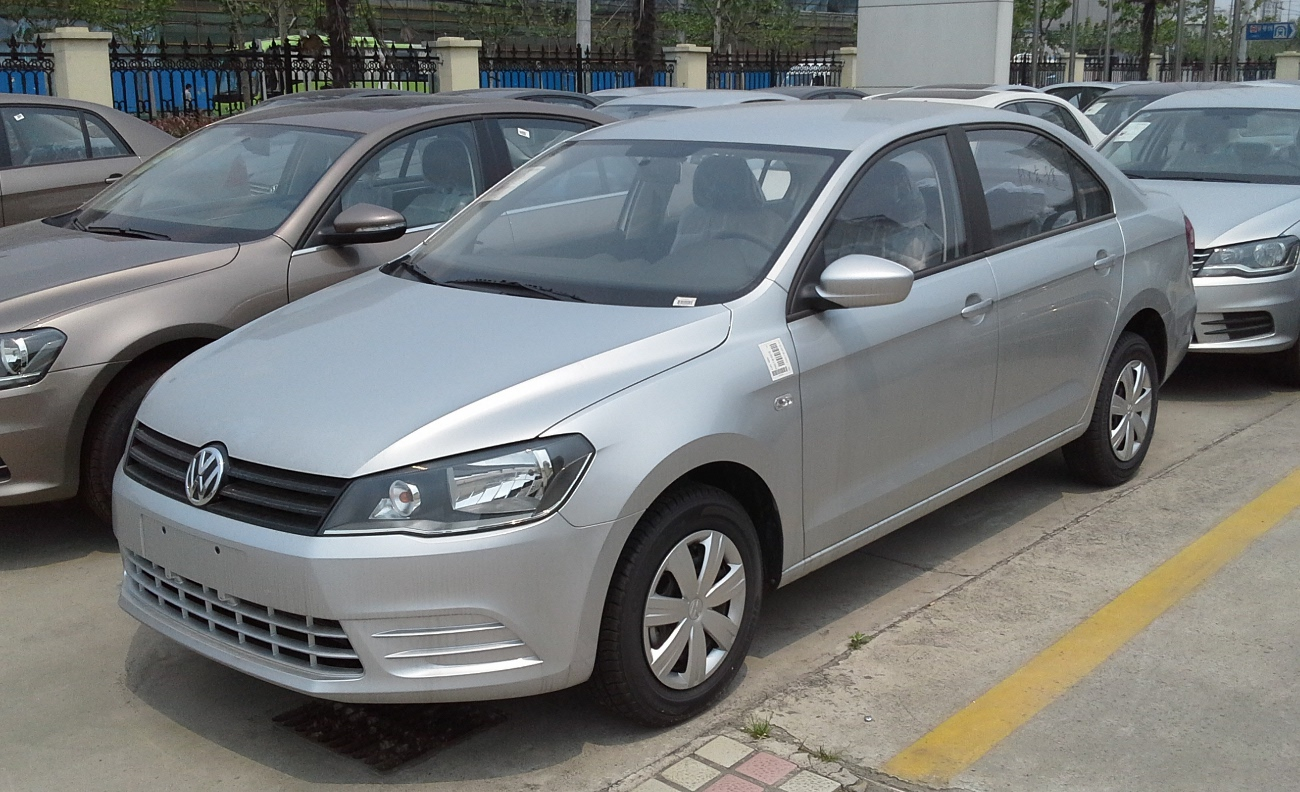

Overview
- Manufacturer: FAW-Volkswagen
- Also called: Pyeonghwa Hwiparam 1613 (North Korea)
- Production: 2013–2020 (Jetta); 2019–present (Jetta VA3)
- Assembly: China: Changchun; Chengdu

Body and chassis
- Class: Subcompact/Supermini (B)
- Body style: 4-door sedan
- Layout: Front engine, front-wheel drive
- Platform: Volkswagen Group A05+
- Related: Volkswagen Santana (A05; 2012); Škoda Rapid; SEAT Toledo (Mk4)

Powertrain
- Engine: 1.4 L CKA I4; 1.6 L EA211 I4; 1.4 L CST I4 (turbo); 1.5 L DCF I4
- Transmission: 5-speed manual 6 speed automatic 7 speed DSG

Dimensions
- Wheelbase: 2,604 mm (102.5 in) (2017–2019); 2,603 mm (102.5 in) (2013–2016)
- Length: 4,501 mm (177.2 in) (2017–2019); 4,487 mm (176.7 in) (2013–2016)
- Width: 1,704 mm (67.1 in) (2017–2019); 1,706 mm (67.2 in) (2013–2016)
- Height: 1,469 mm (57.8 in) (2017–2019); 1,470 mm (57.9 in) (2013–2016)
- Curb weight: 1,120 kg (2,469 lb); 1,170 kg (2,579 lb)

Chronology
- Predecessor: Volkswagen Jetta Pioneer
- Successor: Jetta VA3

The Volkswagen New Jetta 2013 (in Chinese: “大众新捷达2013款”) is a Chinese Volkswagen model produced by FAW-Volkswagen at its plants in Changchun and Chengdu. It was launched in March 2013 and replaced the Volkswagen Jetta Pioneer.

The New Jetta is available with two different engines of the type EA211. These are corresponding by region to the China IV or China V emission standard. It is a four-cylinder in-line engine with 4 valves per cylinder. The fuel injection is controlled electronically, as in all modern engines. The performance is 66 kW (1.4L) or 81 kW (1.6L).

Following equipment lines are offered: Avantgarde (时尚), Comfortline (舒适) and Luxury (豪华). There's a 5-speed manual and a 6-speed automatic transmission option.

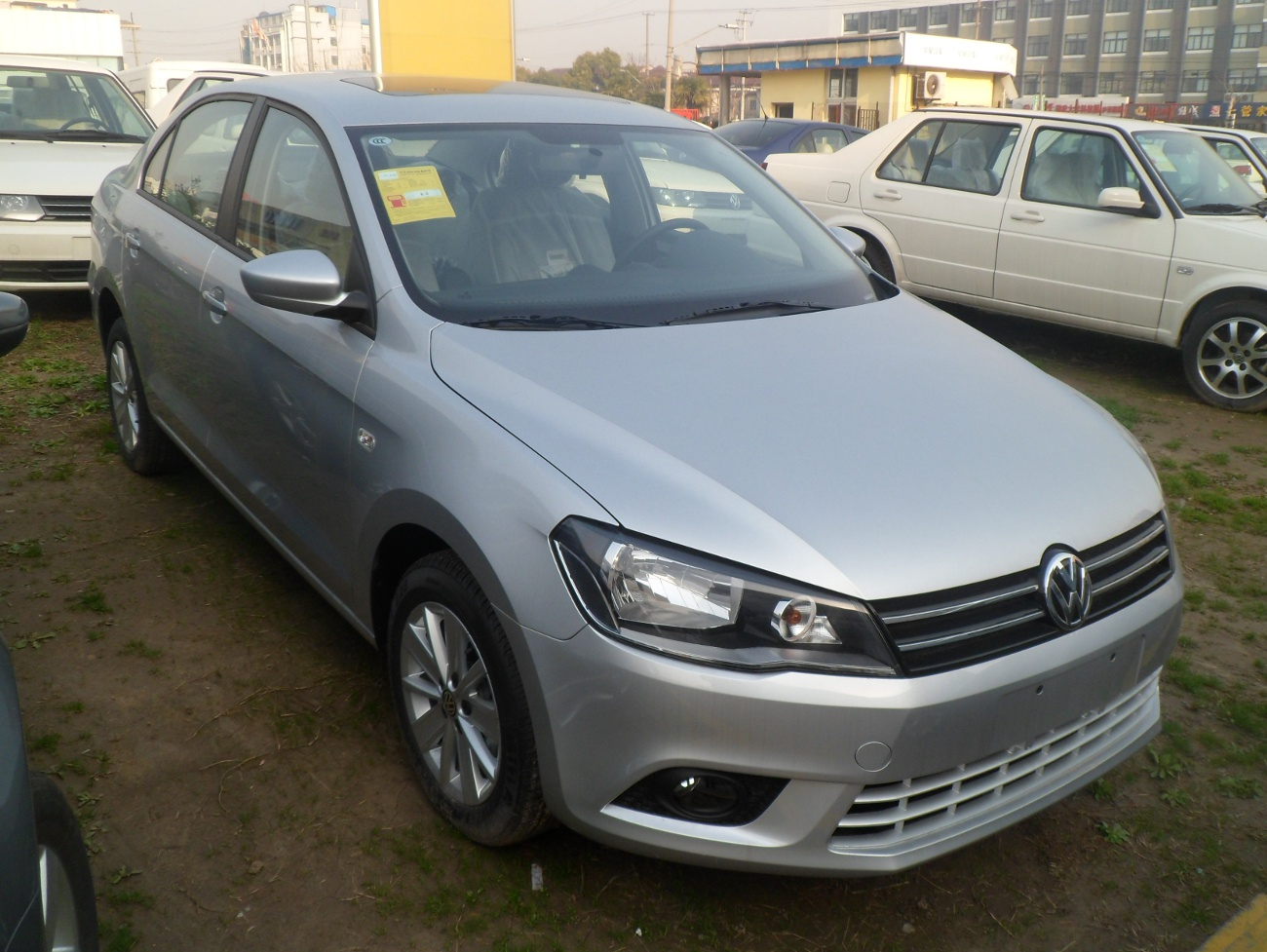
Jetta II (2013-2017) front

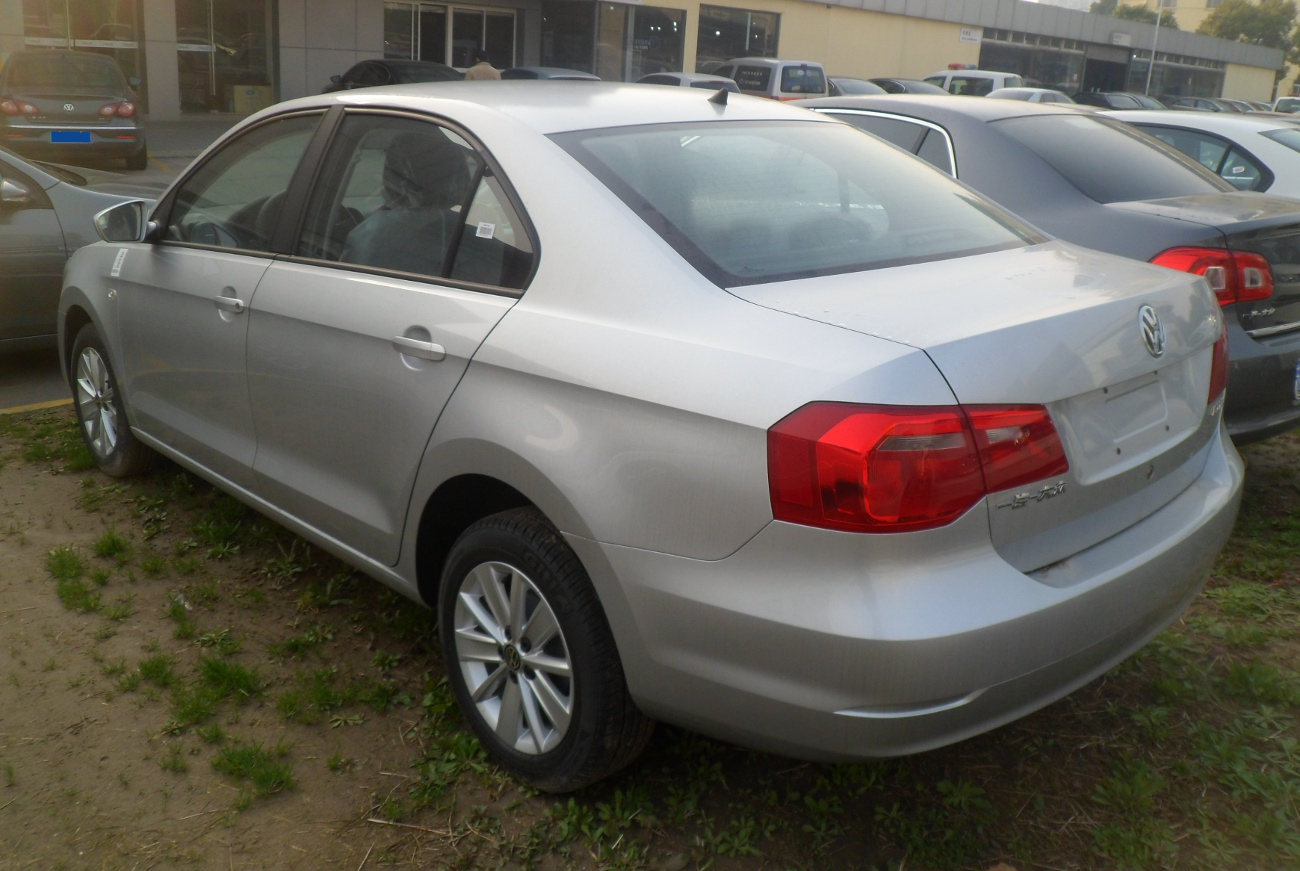
Jetta II (2013-2017) rear

=== 2017 Facelift ===
The New Jetta was given a facelift in 2017 with a new front and rear design and a brand new 1.5 litre engine and 7 speed dual clutch gearbox for the 230TSI model. To differentiate this version with 2013 type, the selling name was branded as "New Jetta 2017" (in Chinese: “新捷达2017款”). Production for the New Jetta ended in March 2020.

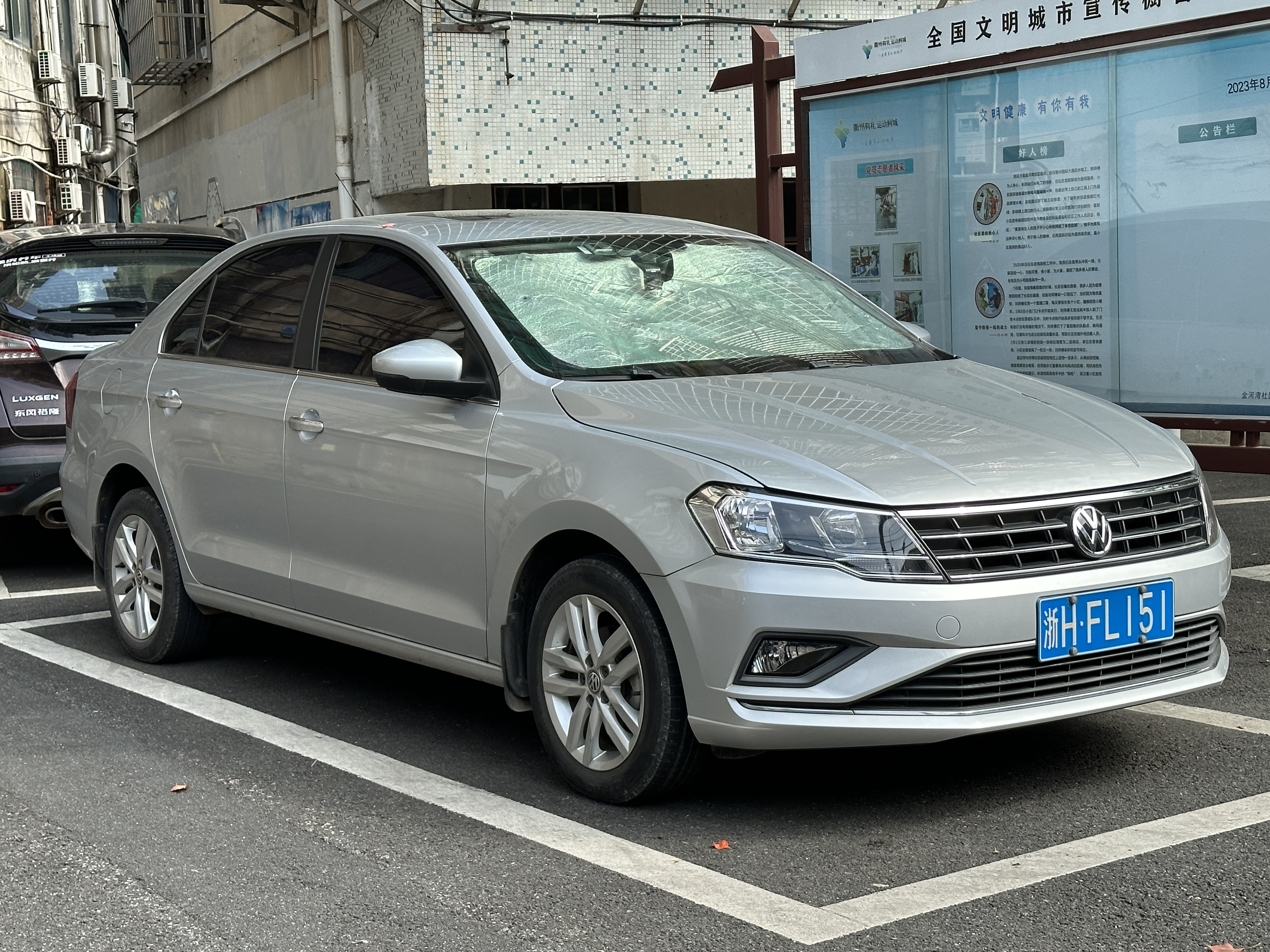
Jetta II (2017-2020) front

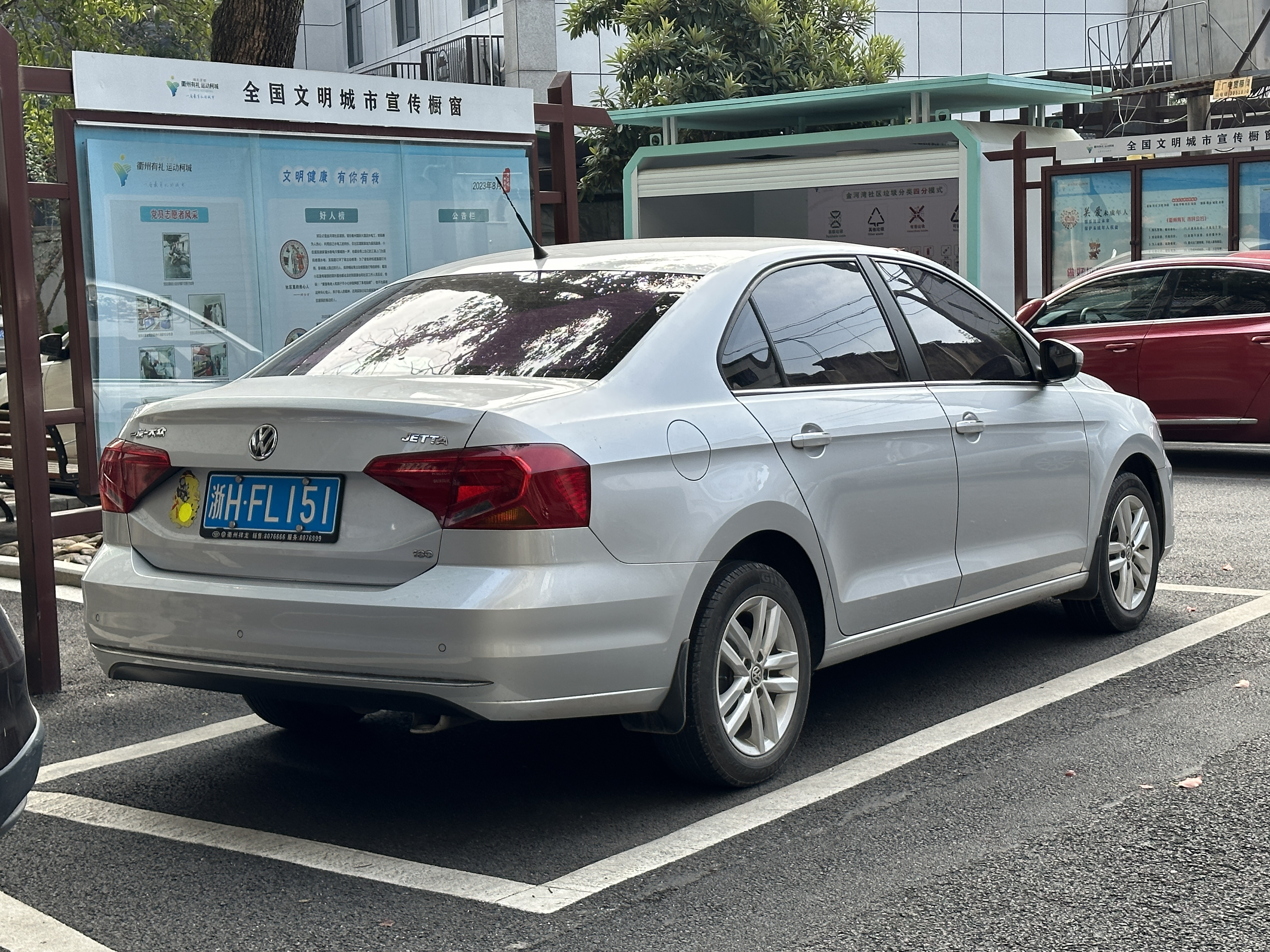
Jetta II (2017-2020) rear

=== Jetta VA3 ===
A new car marque was launched in China in February 2019 known as Jetta and one of the models, the Jetta VA3 is a facelifted and rebadged Jetta Night. According to pictures found on Chinese car website Autohome, the Jetta VA3 was said to be powered by two engine options, a 1.4 litre turbo and the 1.5 litre naturally aspirated EA211 four cylinder engine. The VA3 was officially listed in September 2019 and the 1.5 litre EA211 engine is available paired to a 5 speed manual and 6 speed automatic gearbox.

In August 2023, Jetta VS7, Jetta VS5 and Jetta VA3 were introduced in Tehran, Iran by Mammut khodro, the official distributor of Volkswagen in Iran. The 3 models by Jetta will be released in Iran shortly.

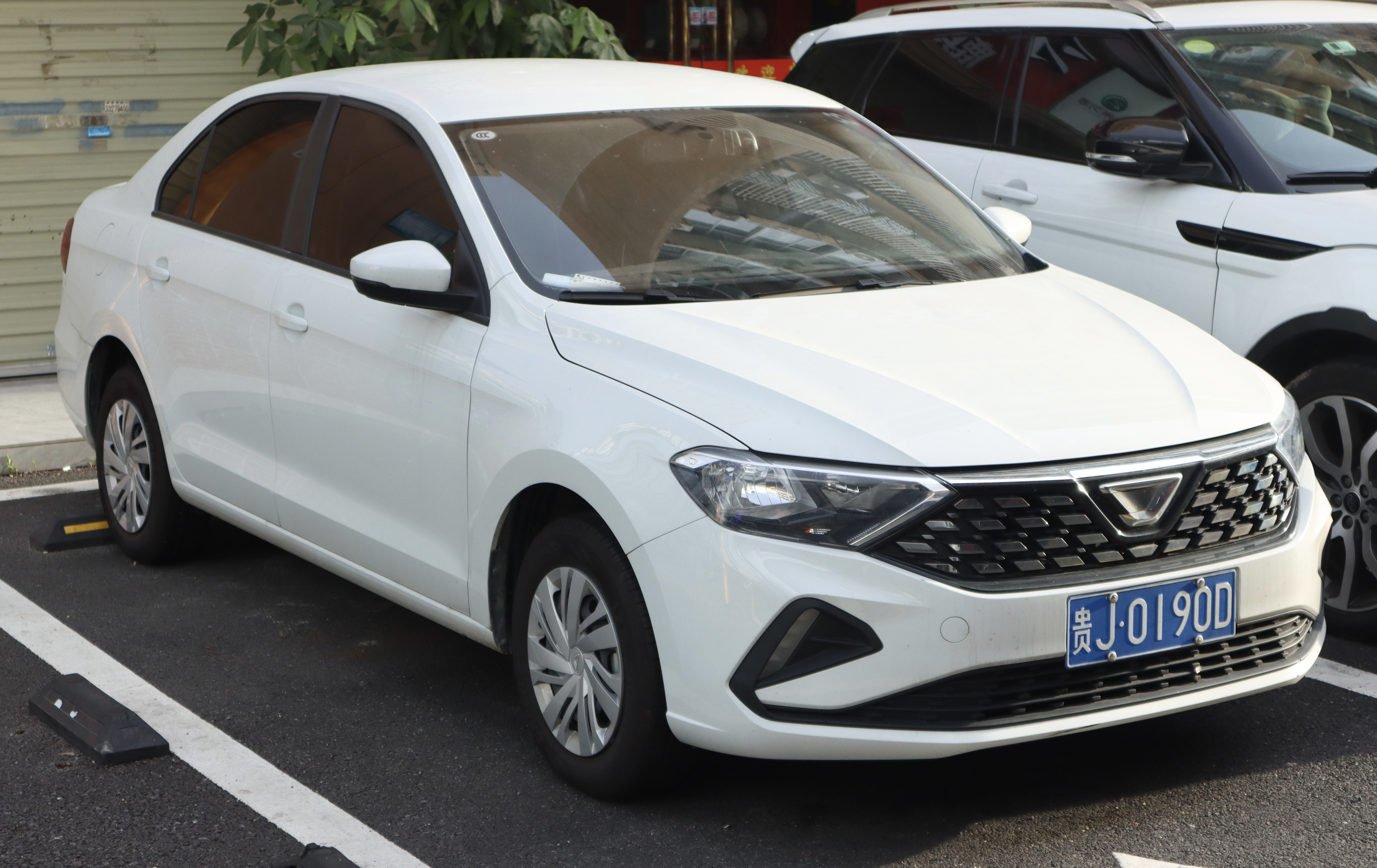
Jetta VA3 (2019–present) front

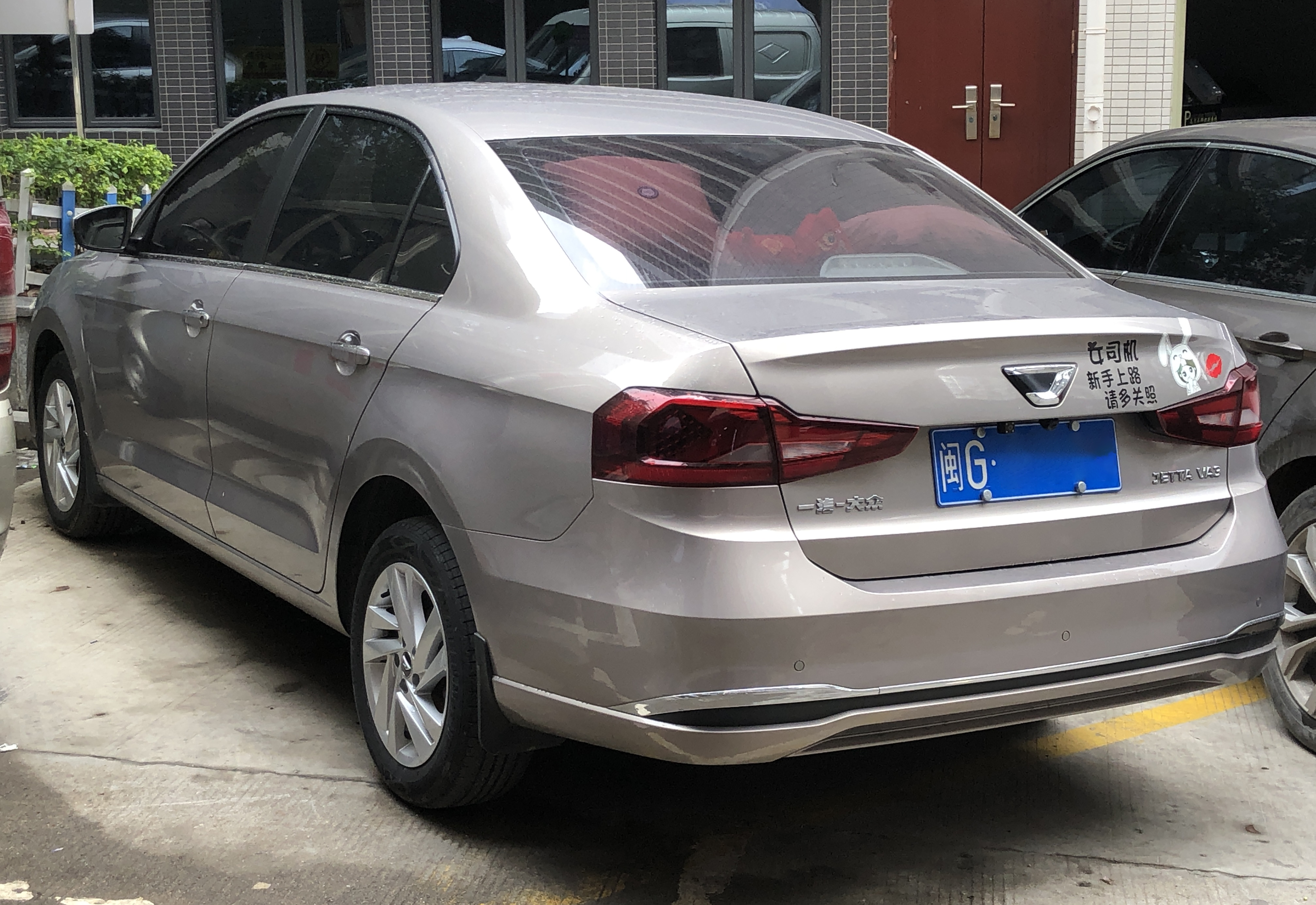
Jetta VA3 (2019–present) rear

== Sales ==
Year	China
2023	30,896
2024	34,413
2025	24,445

== See also ==
- Volkswagen Jetta (Global versions)
- Volkswagen Santana
- Skoda Rapid (2012)
- SEAT Toledo (Mk4)
